= List of 2000 Canadian incumbents =

== Crown ==
- Head of State - Queen Elizabeth II

== Federal government ==
- Governor General - Adrienne Clarkson

=== Cabinet ===
- Prime Minister - Jean Chrétien
- Deputy Prime Minister - Herb Gray
- Minister of Finance - Paul Martin
- Minister of Foreign Affairs - Lloyd Axworthy then John Manley
- Minister of National Defence - Art Eggleton
- Minister of Health - Allan Rock
- Minister of Industry - John Manley then Brian Tobin
- Minister of Heritage - Sheila Copps
- Minister of Intergovernmental Affairs - Stéphane Dion
- Minister of the Environment - David Anderson
- Minister of Justice - Anne McLellan
- Minister of Transport - David Collenette
- Minister of Citizenship and Immigration - Elinor Caplan
- Minister of Fisheries and Oceans - Herb Dhaliwal
- Minister of Agriculture and Agri-Food - Lyle Vanclief
- Minister of Public Works and Government Services - Alfonso Gagliano
- Minister of Human Resources Development - Jane Stewart
- Minister of Natural Resources - Ralph Goodale

== Members of Parliament ==
See: 36th Canadian parliament, 37th Canadian parliament

=== Party leaders ===
- Liberal Party of Canada - Jean Chrétien
- Reform Party of Canada (dissolved March 25) - Preston Manning
- Canadian Alliance (formed March 27) - Deborah Grey (interim) then Stockwell Day
- Bloc Québécois - Gilles Duceppe
- New Democratic Party- Alexa McDonough
- Progressive Conservative Party of Canada - Joe Clark

=== Supreme Court Justices ===
- Chief Justice: Antonio Lamer then Beverley McLachlin
- Frank Iacobucci
- John C. Major
- Michel Bastarache
- William Ian Corneil Binnie
- Louise Arbour
- Louis LeBel (appointed to replace Lamer)
- Claire L'Heureux-Dubé
- Charles D. Gonthier

=== Other ===
- Speaker of the House of Commons - Gilbert Parent
- Governor of the Bank of Canada - Gordon Thiessen
- Chief of the Defence Staff - General Maurice Baril

== Provinces ==
=== Premiers ===
- Premier of Alberta - Ralph Klein
- Premier of British Columbia - Dan Miller then Ujjal Dosanjh
- Premier of Manitoba - Gary Doer
- Premier of New Brunswick - Bernard Lord
- Premier of Newfoundland - Brian Tobin then Beaton Tulk
- Premier of Nova Scotia - John Hamm
- Premier of Ontario - Mike Harris
- Premier of Prince Edward Island - Pat Binns
- Premier of Quebec - Lucien Bouchard
- Premier of Saskatchewan - Roy Romanow
- Premier of the Northwest Territories - James Antoine then Stephen Kakfwi
- Premier of Nunavut - Paul Okalik
- Premier of Yukon - Piers McDonald then Pat Duncan

=== Lieutenant-governors ===
- Lieutenant-Governor of Alberta - Bud Olson then Lois Hole
- Lieutenant-Governor of British Columbia - Garde Gardom
- Lieutenant-Governor of Manitoba - Peter Liba
- Lieutenant-Governor of New Brunswick - Marilyn Trenholme Counsell
- Lieutenant-Governor of Newfoundland and Labrador - Arthur Maxwell House
- Lieutenant-Governor of Nova Scotia - James Kinley then Myra Freeman
- Lieutenant-Governor of Ontario - Hilary Weston
- Lieutenant-Governor of Prince Edward Island - Gilbert Clements
- Lieutenant-Governor of Quebec - Lise Thibault
- Lieutenant-Governor of Saskatchewan - Jack Wiebe then Lynda Haverstock

== Mayors ==
- Toronto - Mel Lastman
- Montreal - Pierre Bourque
- Vancouver - Philip Owen
- Ottawa - Jim Watson
- Victoria - Alan Lowe

== Religious leaders ==
- Roman Catholic Bishop of Quebec - Archbishop Maurice Couture
- Roman Catholic Bishop of Montreal - Cardinal Archbishop Jean-Claude Turcotte
- Roman Catholic Bishops of London - Bishop John Michael Sherlock
- Moderator of the United Church of Canada - Bill Phipps then Marion Pardy

== See also ==
- 1999 Canadian incumbents
- Events in Canada in 2000
- 2001 Canadian incumbents
- Governmental leaders in 2000
- Canadian incumbents by year
