= List of 2001 Canadian incumbents =

== Crown ==
- Head of State – Queen Elizabeth II

== Federal government ==
- Governor General – Adrienne Clarkson

=== Cabinet ===
- Prime Minister – Jean Chrétien
- Deputy Prime Minister – Herb Gray
- Minister of Finance – Paul Martin
- Minister of Foreign Affairs – John Manley
- Minister of National Defence – Art Eggleton
- Minister of Health – Allan Rock
- Minister of Industry – Brian Tobin
- Minister of Heritage – Sheila Copps
- Minister of Intergovernmental Affairs – Stéphane Dion
- Minister of the Environment – David Anderson
- Minister of Justice – Anne McLellan
- Minister of Transport – David Collenette
- Minister of Citizenship and Immigration – Elinor Caplan
- Minister of Fisheries and Oceans – Herb Dhaliwal
- Minister of Agriculture and Agri-Food – Lyle Vanclief
- Minister of Public Works and Government Services – Alfonso Gagliano
- Minister of Human Resources Development – Jane Stewart
- Minister of Natural Resources – Ralph Goodale

== Members of Parliament ==
See: 37th Canadian parliament

=== Party leaders ===
- Liberal Party of Canada – Jean Chrétien
- Canadian Alliance – Stockwell Day
- Bloc Québécois – Gilles Duceppe
- New Democratic Party- Alexa McDonough
- Progressive Conservative Party of Canada – Joe Clark

=== Supreme Court justices ===
- Chief Justice: Beverley McLachlin
- Frank Iacobucci
- John C. Major
- Michel Bastarache
- William Ian Corneil Binnie
- Louise Arbour
- Louis LeBel
- Claire L'Heureux-Dubé
- Charles D. Gonthier

=== Other ===
- Speaker of the House of Commons – Gilbert Parent then Peter Milliken
- Governor of the Bank of Canada – Gordon Thiessen then David Dodge
- Chief of the Defence Staff – General Maurice Baril then General R.R. Henault

== Provinces ==
=== Premiers ===
- Premier of Alberta – Ralph Klein
- Premier of British Columbia – Ujjal Dosanjh then Gordon Campbell
- Premier of Manitoba – Gary Doer
- Premier of New Brunswick – Bernard Lord
- Premier of Newfoundland – Beaton Tulk then Roger Grimes
- Premier of Nova Scotia – John Hamm
- Premier of Ontario – Mike Harris
- Premier of Prince Edward Island – Pat Binns
- Premier of Quebec – Lucien Bouchard then Bernard Landry
- Premier of Saskatchewan – Roy Romanow then Lorne Calvert
- Premier of the Northwest Territories – Stephen Kakfwi
- Premier of Nunavut – Paul Okalik
- Premier of Yukon – Pat Duncan

=== Lieutenant-governors ===
- Lieutenant-Governor of Alberta – Lois Hole
- Lieutenant-Governor of British Columbia – Garde Gardom then Iona Campagnolo
- Lieutenant-Governor of Manitoba – Peter Liba
- Lieutenant-Governor of New Brunswick – Marilyn Trenholme Counsell
- Lieutenant-Governor of Newfoundland and Labrador – Arthur Maxwell House then Edward Roberts
- Lieutenant-Governor of Nova Scotia – Myra Freeman
- Lieutenant-Governor of Ontario – Hilary Weston
- Lieutenant-Governor of Prince Edward Island – Gilbert Clements then Léonce Bernard
- Lieutenant-Governor of Quebec – Lise Thibault
- Lieutenant-Governor of Saskatchewan – Lynda Haverstock

== Mayors ==
- Toronto – Mel Lastman
- Montreal – Pierre Bourque then Gérald Tremblay
- Vancouver – Philip Owen
- Ottawa – Jim Watson then Bob Chiarelli
- Victoria – Alan Lowe

== Religious leaders ==
- Roman Catholic Bishop of Quebec – Archbishop Maurice Couture
- Roman Catholic Bishop of Montreal – Cardinal Archbishop Jean-Claude Turcotte
- Roman Catholic Bishops of London – Bishop John Michael Sherlock
- Moderator of the United Church of Canada – Marion Pardy

== See also ==
- 2000 Canadian incumbents
- Events in Canada in 2001
- 2002 Canadian incumbents
- Governmental leaders in 2001
- Canadian incumbents by year
