= List of 2002 Canadian incumbents =

== Crown ==
- Head of State - Queen Elizabeth II

== Federal government ==
- Governor General - Adrienne Clarkson

=== Cabinet ===
- Prime Minister - Jean Chrétien
- Deputy Prime Minister - Herb Gray then John Manley
- Minister of Finance - Paul Martin then John Manley
- Minister of Foreign Affairs - John Manley then Bill Graham
- Minister of National Defence - Art Eggleton then John McCallum
- Minister of Health - Allan Rock then Anne McLellan
- Minister of Industry - Brian Tobin then Allan Rock
- Minister of Heritage - Sheila Copps
- Minister of Intergovernmental Affairs - Stéphane Dion
- Minister of the Environment - David Anderson
- Minister of Justice - Anne McLellan then Martin Cauchon
- Minister of Transport - David Collenette
- Minister of Citizenship and Immigration - Elinor Caplan then Denis Coderre
- Minister of Fisheries and Oceans - Herb Dhaliwal then Robert Thibault
- Minister of Agriculture and Agri-Food - Lyle Vanclief
- Minister of Public Works and Government Services - Alfonso Gagliano then Don Boudria then Ralph Goodale
- Minister of Human Resources Development - Jane Stewart
- Minister of Natural Resources - Ralph Goodale then Herb Dhaliwal

== Members of Parliament ==
See: 37th Canadian parliament

=== Party leaders ===
- Liberal Party of Canada - Jean Chrétien
- Canadian Alliance - Stockwell Day then Stephen Harper
- Bloc Québécois - Gilles Duceppe
- New Democratic Party - Alexa McDonough
- Progressive Conservative Party of Canada - Joe Clark

=== Supreme Court justices ===
- Chief Justice: Beverley McLachlin
- Frank Iacobucci
- John C. Major
- Michel Bastarache
- William Ian Corneil Binnie
- Louise Arbour
- Louis LeBel
- Claire L'Heureux-Dubé then Marie Deschamps
- Charles D. Gonthier

=== Other ===
- Speaker of the House of Commons - Peter Milliken
- Governor of the Bank of Canada - David Dodge
- Chief of the Defence Staff - General R.R. Henault

== Provinces ==
=== Premiers ===
- Premier of Alberta - Ralph Klein
- Premier of British Columbia - Gordon Campbell
- Premier of Manitoba - Gary Doer
- Premier of New Brunswick - Bernard Lord
- Premier of Newfoundland - Roger Grimes
- Premier of Nova Scotia - John Hamm
- Premier of Ontario - Mike Harris then Ernie Eves
- Premier of Prince Edward Island - Pat Binns
- Premier of Quebec - Bernard Landry
- Premier of Saskatchewan - Lorne Calvert
- Premier of the Northwest Territories - Stephen Kakfwi
- Premier of Nunavut - Paul Okalik
- Premier of Yukon - Pat Duncan then Dennis Fentie

=== Lieutenant-governors ===
- Lieutenant-Governor of Alberta - Lois Hole
- Lieutenant-Governor of British Columbia - Iona Campagnolo
- Lieutenant-Governor of Manitoba - Peter Liba
- Lieutenant-Governor of New Brunswick - Marilyn Trenholme Counsell
- Lieutenant-Governor of Newfoundland and Labrador - Arthur Maxwell House then Edward Roberts
- Lieutenant-Governor of Nova Scotia - Myra Freeman
- Lieutenant-Governor of Ontario - Hilary Weston then James Bartleman
- Lieutenant-Governor of Prince Edward Island - Léonce Bernard
- Lieutenant-Governor of Quebec - Lise Thibault
- Lieutenant-Governor of Saskatchewan - Lynda Haverstock

== Mayors ==
- Toronto - Mel Lastman
- Montreal - Gérald Tremblay
- Vancouver - Philip Owen then Larry Campbell
- Ottawa - Bob Chiarelli
- Victoria - Alan Lowe

== Religious leaders ==
- Roman Catholic Bishop of Quebec - Archbishop Maurice Couture then Cardinal Archbishop Marc Ouellet
- Roman Catholic Bishop of Montreal - Cardinal Archbishop Jean-Claude Turcotte
- Roman Catholic Bishops of London - Bishop John Michael Sherlock then Bishop Ronald Peter Fabbro
- Moderator of the United Church of Canada - Marion Pardy

== See also ==
- 2001 Canadian incumbents
- Events in Canada in 2002
- 2003 Canadian incumbents
- Governmental leaders in 2002
- Canadian incumbents by year
