= List of 1997 Canadian incumbents =

== Crown ==
- Head of State – Queen Elizabeth II

== Federal government ==
- Governor General – Roméo LeBlanc

=== Cabinet ===
- Prime Minister – Jean Chrétien
- Deputy Prime Minister – Sheila Copps then Herb Gray
- Minister of Finance – Paul Martin
- Minister of Foreign Affairs – Lloyd Axworthy
- Minister of National Defence – Doug Young then Art Eggleton
- Minister of Health – David Dingwall then Allan Rock
- Minister of Industry – John Manley
- Minister of Heritage – Sheila Copps
- Minister of Intergovernmental Affairs – Stéphane Dion
- Minister of the Environment – Sergio Marchi then Christine Stewart
- Minister of Justice – Allan Rock then Anne McLellan
- Minister of Transport – David Anderson then David Collenette
- Minister of Citizenship and Immigration – Lucienne Robillard
- Minister of Fisheries and Oceans – Fred Mifflin then David Anderson
- Minister of Agriculture – Ralph Goodale then Lyle Vanclief
- Minister of Public Works and Government Services – Diane Marleau then Alfonso Gagliano
- Minister of Human Resources Development – Pierre Pettigrew
- Minister of Natural Resources – Anne McLellan then Ralph Goodale

== Members of Parliament ==
See: 35th Canadian parliament, 36th Canadian parliament

=== Party leaders ===
- Liberal Party of Canada – Jean Chrétien
- Bloc Québécois – Michel Gauthier then Gilles Duceppe
- New Democratic Party – Alexa McDonough
- Progressive Conservative Party of Canada – Jean Charest
- Reform Party of Canada – Preston Manning

=== Supreme Court Justices ===
- Chief Justice: Antonio Lamer
- Beverley McLachlin
- Frank Iacobucci
- John C. Major
- Gérard V. La Forest then Michel Bastarache
- John Sopinka (retired November 24)
- Peter deCarteret Cory
- Claire L'Heureux-Dubé
- Charles D. Gonthier

=== Other ===
- Speaker of the House of Commons – Gilbert Parent
- Governor of the Bank of Canada – Gordon Thiessen
- Chief of the Defence Staff – Vice-Admiral Larry Murray then General Maurice Baril

== Provinces ==
=== Premiers ===
- Premier of Alberta – Ralph Klein
- Premier of British Columbia – Glen Clark
- Premier of Manitoba – Gary Filmon
- Premier of New Brunswick – Frank McKenna then Raymond Frenette
- Premier of Newfoundland – Brian Tobin
- Premier of Nova Scotia – John Savage then Russell MacLellan
- Premier of Ontario – Mike Harris
- Premier of Prince Edward Island – Pat Binns
- Premier of Quebec – Lucien Bouchard
- Premier of Saskatchewan – Roy Romanow
- Premier of the Northwest Territories – Don Morin
- Premier of Yukon – Piers McDonald

=== Lieutenant-governors ===
- Lieutenant-Governor of Alberta – Bud Olson
- Lieutenant-Governor of British Columbia – Garde Gardom
- Lieutenant-Governor of Manitoba – Yvon Dumont
- Lieutenant-Governor of New Brunswick – Margaret Norrie McCain then Marilyn Trenholme Counsell
- Lieutenant-Governor of Newfoundland and Labrador – Frederick Russell then Arthur Maxwell House
- Lieutenant-Governor of Nova Scotia – James Kinley
- Lieutenant-Governor of Ontario – Hal Jackman then Hilary Weston
- Lieutenant-Governor of Prince Edward Island – Gilbert Clements
- Lieutenant-Governor of Quebec – Jean-Louis Roux then Lise Thibault
- Lieutenant-Governor of Saskatchewan – Jack Wiebe

== Mayors ==
- Toronto – Barbara Hall
- Montreal – Pierre Bourque
- Vancouver – Philip Owen
- Ottawa – Jacquelin Holzman then Jim Watson

== Religious leaders ==
- Roman Catholic Bishop of Quebec – Archbishop Maurice Couture
- Roman Catholic Bishop of Montreal – Cardinal Archbishop Jean-Claude Turcotte
- Roman Catholic Bishops of London – Bishop John Michael Sherlock
- Moderator of the United Church of Canada – Marion Best then Bill Phipps

== See also ==
- 1996 Canadian incumbents
- Events in Canada in 1997
- 1998 Canadian incumbents
- Governmental leaders in 1997
- Canadian incumbents by year
