= List of 2003 Canadian incumbents =

== Crown ==
- Head of State - Queen Elizabeth II

== Federal government ==
- Governor General - Adrienne Clarkson

=== Cabinet ===
- Prime Minister - Jean Chrétien then Paul Martin
- Deputy Prime Minister - John Manley then Anne McLellan
- Minister of Finance - John Manley then Ralph Goodale
- Minister of Foreign Affairs - Bill Graham
- Minister of National Defence - John McCallum then David Pratt
- Minister of Health - Anne McLellan then Pierre Pettigrew
- Minister of Industry - Allan Rock then Lucienne Robillard
- Minister of Heritage - Sheila Copps then Hélène Scherrer
- Minister of Intergovernmental Affairs - Stéphane Dion then Pierre Pettigrew
- Minister of the Environment - David Anderson
- Minister of Justice - Martin Cauchon then Irwin Cotler
- Minister of Transport - David Collenette then Tony Valeri
- Minister of Citizenship and Immigration - Denis Coderre then Judy Sgro
- Minister of Fisheries and Oceans - Robert Thibault then Geoff Regan
- Minister of Agriculture and Agri-Food - Lyle Vanclief then Bob Speller
- Minister of Public Works and Government Services - Ralph Goodale then Stephen Owen
- Minister of Human Resources Development - Jane Stewart (position discontinued on December 11)
- Minister of Natural Resources - Herb Dhaliwal then John Efford
- Minister of Human Resources and Skills Development - Joe Volpe (position created on December 12)
- Minister of Social Development - Liza Frulla (position created on December 12)

== Members of Parliament ==
See: 37th Canadian parliament

=== Party leaders ===
- Liberal Party of Canada - Jean Chrétien then Paul Martin
- Canadian Alliance - Stephen Harper
- Bloc Québécois - Gilles Duceppe
- New Democratic Party - Alexa McDonough then Jack Layton
- Progressive Conservative Party of Canada - Joe Clark then Peter MacKay

=== Supreme Court Justices ===
- Chief Justice: Beverley McLachlin
- Frank Iacobucci
- John C. Major
- Michel Bastarache
- William Ian Corneil Binnie
- Louise Arbour
- Louis LeBel
- Marie Deschamps
- Charles D. Gonthier then Morris Fish

=== Other ===
- Speaker of the House of Commons - Peter Milliken
- Governor of the Bank of Canada - David Dodge
- Chief of the Defence Staff - General R.R. Henault

== Provinces ==
=== Premiers ===
- Premier of Alberta - Ralph Klein
- Premier of British Columbia - Gordon Campbell
- Premier of Manitoba - Gary Doer
- Premier of New Brunswick - Bernard Lord
- Premier of Newfoundland and Labrador - Roger Grimes, then Danny Williams
- Premier of Nova Scotia - John Hamm
- Premier of Ontario - Ernie Eves, then Dalton McGuinty
- Premier of Prince Edward Island - Pat Binns
- Premier of Quebec - Bernard Landry, then Jean Charest
- Premier of Saskatchewan - Lorne Calvert
- Premier of the Northwest Territories - Stephen Kakfwi, then Joe Handley
- Premier of Nunavut - Paul Okalik
- Premier of Yukon - Dennis Fentie

=== Lieutenant-governors ===
- Lieutenant-Governor of Alberta - Lois Hole
- Lieutenant-Governor of British Columbia - Iona Campagnolo
- Lieutenant-Governor of Manitoba - Peter Liba
- Lieutenant-Governor of New Brunswick - Marilyn Trenholme Counsell then Herménégilde Chiasson
- Lieutenant-Governor of Newfoundland and Labrador - Edward Roberts
- Lieutenant-Governor of Nova Scotia - Myra Freeman
- Lieutenant-Governor of Ontario - James Bartleman
- Lieutenant-Governor of Prince Edward Island - Léonce Bernard
- Lieutenant-Governor of Quebec - Lise Thibault
- Lieutenant-Governor of Saskatchewan - Lynda Haverstock

== Mayors ==
- Toronto - Mel Lastman then David Miller
- Montreal - Gérald Tremblay
- Vancouver - Larry Campbell
- Ottawa - Bob Chiarelli
- Victoria - Alan Lowe

== Religious leaders ==
- Roman Catholic Bishop of Quebec - Cardinal Archbishop Marc Ouellet
- Roman Catholic Bishop of Montreal - Cardinal Archbishop Jean-Claude Turcotte
- Roman Catholic Bishops of London - Bishop Ronald Peter Fabbro
- Moderator of the United Church of Canada - Marion Pardy then Peter Short

== See also ==
- 2002 Canadian incumbents
- Events in Canada in 2003
- 2004 Canadian incumbents
- Governmental leaders in 2003, Canadian incumbents by year
