= List of 1996 Canadian incumbents =

== Crown ==
- Head of State – Queen Elizabeth II

== Federal government ==
- Governor General – Roméo LeBlanc

=== Cabinet ===
- Prime Minister – Jean Chrétien
- Deputy Prime Minister – Sheila Copps
- Minister of Finance – Paul Martin
- Minister of Foreign Affairs – André Ouellet then Lloyd Axworthy
- Minister of National Defence – David Collenette then Doug Young
- Minister of Health – Diane Marleau then David Dingwall
- Minister of Industry – John Manley
- Minister of Heritage – Sheila Copps (position was only created on July 12 of 1996)
- Minister of Intergovernmental Affairs – Marcel Massé then Stéphane Dion
- Minister of the Environment – Sheila Copps then Sergio Marchi
- Minister of Justice – Allan Rock
- Minister of Transport – Doug Young then David Anderson
- Minister of Communications – Michel Dupuy then Sheila Copps (position merged into that of Heritage Minister on July 11, 1996)
- Minister of Citizenship and Immigration – Sergio Marchi then Lucienne Robillard
- Minister of Fisheries and Oceans – Brian Tobin then Fred Mifflin
- Minister of Agriculture – Ralph Goodale
- Minister of Public Works and Government Services – Diane Marleau (position created on July 12.)
- Minister of Employment and Immigration – Lloyd Axworthy then Doug Young then Pierre Pettigrew (position was renamed Minister of Human Resources Development on July 11)
- Minister of Natural Resources – Anne McLellan
- Minister of Public Works – David Dingwall then Diane Marleau (position discontinued on July 11)
- Minister of Supply and Services – David Dingwall then Diane Marleau (position discontinued on July 11)

== Members of Parliament ==
See: 35th Canadian parliament

=== Party leaders ===
- Liberal Party of Canada – Jean Chrétien
- Bloc Québécois – Lucien Bouchard then Gilles Duceppe (interim) then Michel Gauthier
- New Democratic Party- Alexa McDonough
- Progressive Conservative Party of Canada – Jean Charest
- Reform Party of Canada – Preston Manning

=== Supreme Court Justices ===
- Chief Justice: Antonio Lamer
- Beverley McLachlin
- Frank Iacobucci
- John C. Major
- Gérard V. La Forest
- John Sopinka
- Peter deCarteret Cory
- Claire L'Heureux-Dubé
- Charles D. Gonthier

=== Other ===
- Speaker of the House of Commons – Gilbert Parent
- Governor of the Bank of Canada – Gordon Thiessen
- Chief of the Defence Staff – General Jean Boyle then Vice-Admiral Larry Murray

== Provinces ==
=== Premiers ===
- Premier of Alberta – Ralph Klein
- Premier of British Columbia – Mike Harcourt then Glen Clark
- Premier of Manitoba – Gary Filmon
- Premier of New Brunswick – Frank McKenna
- Premier of Newfoundland – Clyde Wells then Brian Tobin
- Premier of Nova Scotia – John Savage
- Premier of Ontario – Mike Harris
- Premier of Prince Edward Island – Catherine Callbeck then Keith Milligan then Pat Binns
- Premier of Quebec – Jacques Parizeau then Lucien Bouchard
- Premier of Saskatchewan – Roy Romanow
- Premier of the Northwest Territories – Don Morin
- Premier of Yukon – John Ostashek then Piers McDonald

=== Lieutenant-governors ===
- Lieutenant-Governor of Alberta – Gordon Towers then Bud Olson
- Lieutenant-Governor of British Columbia – Garde Gardom
- Lieutenant-Governor of Manitoba – Yvon Dumont
- Lieutenant-Governor of New Brunswick – Margaret Norrie McCain
- Lieutenant-Governor of Newfoundland and Labrador – Frederick Russell
- Lieutenant-Governor of Nova Scotia – James Kinley
- Lieutenant-Governor of Ontario – Hal Jackman
- Lieutenant-Governor of Prince Edward Island – Gilbert Clements
- Lieutenant-Governor of Quebec – Martial Asselin then Jean-Louis Roux
- Lieutenant-Governor of Saskatchewan – Jack Wiebe

== Mayors ==
- Toronto – Barbara Hall
- Montreal – Pierre Bourque
- Vancouver – Philip Owen
- Ottawa – Jacquelin Holzman

== Religious leaders ==
- Roman Catholic Bishop of Quebec – Archbishop Maurice Couture
- Roman Catholic Bishop of Montreal – Cardinal Archbishop Jean-Claude Turcotte
- Roman Catholic Bishops of London – Bishop John Michael Sherlock
- Moderator of the United Church of Canada – Marion Best

== See also ==
- 1995 Canadian incumbents
- Events in Canada in 1996
- 1997 Canadian incumbents
- Governmental leaders in 1996
- Canadian incumbents by year
