= List of 2010 Canadian incumbents =

== Crown ==
- Head of state (monarch) – Queen Elizabeth II

== Federal government ==
- Governor General
  - Michaëlle Jean (to October 1)
  - David Johnston (from October 1)

=== Cabinet ===
28th Canadian Ministry

- Prime Minister – Stephen Harper
- Minister of Finance – Jim Flaherty
- Minister of Foreign Affairs – Lawrence Cannon
- Minister of International Trade
  - Stockwell Day (to January 19)
  - Peter Van Loan (from January 19)
- Minister of National Defence – Peter MacKay
- Minister of Health – Leona Aglukkaq
- Minister of Industry – Tony Clement
- Minister of National Revenue
  - Jean-Pierre Blackburn (to January 19)
  - Keith Ashfield (from January 19)
- Minister of Heritage – Josée Verner
- Minister of Intergovernmental Affairs – Josée Verner
- Minister of the Environment
  - Jim Prentice (to November 5)
  - John Baird (from November 7)
- Leader of the Government in the House of Commons (House Leader)
  - Jay Hill (to August 6)
  - John Baird (from August 6)
- Minister of Justice – Rob Nicholson
- Minister of Transport
  - John Baird (to August 6)
  - Chuck Strahl (from August 6)
- Minister of Labour
  - Rona Ambrose (to January 19)
  - Lisa Raitt (from January 19)
- Minister of Canadian Heritage – James Moore
- Minister of Citizenship and Immigration – Jason Kenney
- Minister of Indian Affairs and Northern Development
  - Chuck Strahl (to August 6)
  - John Duncan (from August 6)
- Minister of Veterans Affairs
  - Greg Thompson (to January 16)
  - Jean-Pierre Blackburn (from January 19)
- Minister of Fisheries and Oceans – Gail Shea
- Minister of Agriculture and Agri-Food – Gerry Ritz
- Minister of Public Works and Government Services
  - Christian Paradis (to January 19)
  - Rona Ambrose (from January 19)
- Minister of Public Safety
  - Peter Van Loan (to January 19)
  - Vic Toews (from January 19)
- President of the Treasury Board
  - Vic Toews (to January 19)
  - Stockwell Day (from January 19)
- Minister of Natural Resources
  - Lisa Raitt (to January 19)
  - Christian Paradis (from January 19)
- Minister of Human Resources and Skills Development – Diane Finley
- Minister of Western Economic Diversification
  - Jim Prentice (to November 5)
  - Rona Ambrose (from November 5)
- Minister for International Cooperation – Bev Oda

== Parliament ==
See: 40th Canadian parliament

=== Party leaders ===
- Liberal Party of Canada – Michael Ignatieff
- Conservative Party of Canada – Stephen Harper
- Bloc Québécois – Gilles Duceppe
- New Democratic Party – Jack Layton
- Green Party of Canada – Elizabeth May

=== Other ===
- Speaker of the Senate – Noël Kinsella
- Speaker of the House of Commons – Peter Milliken
- Governor of the Bank of Canada – Mark Carney
- Chief of the Defence Staff – General Walter J. Natynczyk

=== Supreme Court justices ===
- Chief Justice: Beverley McLachlin
- Marshall Rothstein
- Michel Bastarache
- William Ian Corneil Binnie
- Louis LeBel
- Marie Deschamps
- Morris Fish
- Louise Charron
- Rosalie Abella

== Provinces and territories ==
=== Commissioners ===
- Commissioner of Yukon
  - Geraldine Van Bibber (to November 30)
  - Doug Phillips (acting from November 30 to December 17; Commissioner thereafter)
- Commissioners of Northwest Territories
  - Tony Whitford (to April 28)
  - Margaret Thom (acting)
  - George Tuccaro (from May 28)
- Commissioners of Nunavut
  - Ann Meekitjuk Hanson (to April 10)
  - Nellie Kusugak (acting)
  - Edna Elias (from May 31)

=== Lieutenant governors ===
- Lieutenant Governor of Alberta
  - Norman Kwong (to May 11)
  - Donald Ethell (from May 11)
- Lieutenant Governor of British Columbia – Steven Point
- Lieutenant Governor of Manitoba – Philip S. Lee
- Lieutenant Governor of New Brunswick – Graydon Nicholas
- Lieutenant Governor of Newfoundland and Labrador – John Crosbie
- Lieutenant Governor of Nova Scotia – Mayann Francis
- Lieutenant Governor of Ontario – David Onley
- Lieutenant Governor of Prince Edward Island – Barbara Hagerman
- Lieutenant Governor of Quebec – Pierre Duchesne
- Lieutenant Governor of Saskatchewan – Gordon Barnhart

=== Premiers ===
- Premier of Alberta – Ed Stelmach
- Premier of British Columbia – Gordon Campbell
- Premier of Manitoba – Greg Selinger
- Premier of New Brunswick
  - Shawn Graham (to October 12)
  - David Alward (from October 12)
- Premier of Newfoundland and Labrador
  - Danny Williams (to December 3)
  - Kathy Dunderdale (from December 3)
- Premier of Nova Scotia – Darrell Dexter
- Premier of Ontario – Dalton McGuinty
- Premier of Prince Edward Island – Robert Ghiz
- Premier of Quebec – Jean Charest
- Premier of Saskatchewan – Brad Wall
- Premier of the Northwest Territories – Floyd Roland
- Premier of Nunavut – Eva Aariak
- Premier of Yukon – Dennis Fentie

== Mayors ==
see also list of mayors in Canada

- Calgary – Dave Bronconnier
- Charlottetown – Clifford J. Lee
- Edmonton – Stephen Mandel
- Fredericton – Brad Woodside
- Halifax – Peter J. Kelly
- Iqaluit – Elisapee Sheutiapik then Madeleine Redfern
- Ottawa – Larry O'Brien then Jim Watson
- Quebec City – Régis Labeaume
- Regina – Pat Fiacco
- St. John's – Dennis O'Keefe
- Toronto – David Miller then Rob Ford
- Vancouver – Gregor Robertson
- Victoria – Dean Fortin
- Whitehorse – Bev Buckway
- Winnipeg – Sam Katz
- Yellowknife – Gordon Van Tighem

== Religious leaders ==
- Roman Catholic Archbishop of Quebec and Primate of Canada – Cardinal Archbishop Marc Ouellet
- Roman Catholic Archbishop of Montreal – Cardinal Archbishop Jean-Claude Turcotte
- Roman Catholic Bishops of London – Bishop Ronald Peter Fabbro
- Roman Catholic Archbishop of Toronto – Archbishop Thomas Christopher Collins
- Primate of the Anglican Church of Canada – Fred Hiltz
- Moderator of the United Church of Canada – David Giuliano
- Moderator of the Presbyterian Church in Canada – Wilma Welsh
- National Bishop of the Evangelical Lutheran Church in Canada – Raymond Schultz

== Peer ==
- Michael Grant, 12th Baron de Longueuil

== See also ==
- 2009 Canadian incumbents
- Events in Canada in 2010
- Canadian incumbents by year
