= List of Canadian incumbents by year =

This is a list of Canadian incumbents in any given year. This includes cabinet ministers, premiers and lieutenant governors of provinces, mayors, Supreme Court justices, religious leaders, and others.

== Twenty-first century ==
2010 - 2009 - 2008 - 2007 - 2006 - 2005 - 2004 - 2003 - 2002 - 2001

== Twentieth century ==
2000 - 1999 - 1998 - 1997 - 1996 - 1995 - 1994 - 1993 - 1992 - 1991
1990 - 1989 - 1988 - 1987 - 1986 - 1985 - 1984 - 1983 - 1982 - 1981
1980 - 1979 - 1978 - 1977 - 1976 - 1975 - 1974 - 1973 - 1972 - 1971
1970 - 1969 - 1968 - 1967 - 1966 - 1965 - 1964 - 1963 - 1962 - 1961
1960 - 1959 - 1958 - 1957 - 1956 - 1955 - 1954 - 1953 - 1952 - 1951
1950 - 1949 - 1948 - 1947 - 1946 - 1945 - 1944 - 1943 - 1942 - 1941
1940 - 1939 - 1938 - 1937 - 1936 - 1935 - 1934 - 1933 - 1932 - 1931
1930 - 1929 - 1928 - 1927 - 1926 - 1925 - 1924 - 1923 - 1922 - 1921
1920 - 1919 - 1918 - 1917 - 1916 - 1915 - 1914 - 1913 - 1912 - 1911
1910 - 1909 - 1908 - 1907 - 1906 - 1905 - 1904 - 1903 - 1902 - 1901

== Nineteenth century ==
1900 - 1899 - 1898 - 1897 - 1896 - 1895 - 1894 - 1893 - 1892 - 1891
1890 - 1889 - 1888 - 1887 - 1886 - 1885 - 1884 - 1883 - 1882 - 1881
1880 - 1879 - 1878 - 1877 - 1876 - 1875 - 1874 - 1873 - 1872 - 1871
1870 - 1869 - 1868 - 1867

== See also ==
- List of years in Canada
