= List of 1867 Canadian incumbents =

== Crown ==
- Head of state (monarch) – Queen Victoria of the United Kingdom

== Federal government ==
- Governor General - The Viscount Monck

=== Cabinet ===
- Prime Minister - Sir John A. Macdonald
- Minister of Agriculture - Jean-Charles Chapais (from July 1)
- Minister of Finance
  - Alexander Galt (July 1-November 7)
  - Vacant (November 7-November 18)
  - Sir John Rose (from November 18)
- Minister of Justice - John A. Macdonald (from July 1)
- President of the Queen's Privy Council for Canada - Adam Johnston Fergusson Blair (from July 1)
- Minister of Public Works - William McDougall (from July 1)
- Postmaster General - Alexander Campbell (from July 1)
- Secretary of State for Canada - Hector Louis Langevin (from July 1)
- Minister of Marine and Fisheries - Peter Mitchell (from July 1)

== Members of Parliament ==
See: 1st Canadian parliament, then 2nd Canadian parliament

=== Opposition leaders ===
- Liberal Party of Canada - George Brown
- Anti-Confederate - Joseph Howe

=== Other ===
- Speaker of the House of Commons - James Cockburn

== Provinces ==
=== Premiers ===
- Premier of New Brunswick - Andrew R. Wetmore
- Premier of Nova Scotia - Charles Tupper
- Premier of Ontario - John Sandfield Macdonald
- Premier of Quebec - Pierre-Joseph-Olivier Chauveau

=== Lieutenant governors ===
- Lieutenant-Governor of New Brunswick - Francis Pym Harding
- Lieutenant-Governor of Nova Scotia - Sir Charles Hastings Doyle
- Lieutenant-Governor of Ontario - Henry William Stisted
- Lieutenant-Governor of Quebec - Narcisse-Fortunat Belleau

== See also ==
- 1867 in Canada
- Canadian incumbents by year
