= Herb Dhaliwal =

Canadian politician (born 1952)

The Honourable Herb Dhaliwal PC
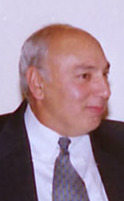
- Dhaliwal in 2004

Member of Parliament for Vancouver South
- In office 1993–1997
- Preceded by: John Allen Fraser
- Succeeded by: Riding dissolved

Member of Parliament for Vancouver South—Burnaby
- In office 1997–2004
- Preceded by: First member
- Succeeded by: Riding dissolved

Minister of National Revenue
- In office 1997–1999

Minister of Fisheries and Oceans
- In office 1999–2002

Minister of Natural Resources
- In office 2002–2003

Personal details
- Born: 12 December 1952 (age 73) Village Chaheru, Distt. Kapurthala, Punjab, India
- Party: Liberal
- Profession: Businessman

Harbance Singh (Herb) Dhaliwal, PC (born 12 December 1952) is a Canadian politician and businessman.

He was first elected to the House of Commons of Canada in the 1993 election as the Liberal Member of Parliament (MP) for Vancouver South.

Prime Minister Jean Chrétien recommended Dhaliwal's appointment to Cabinet (the first Indian-Canadian to become a federal cabinet minister) in 1997 as Minister of Revenue. In 1999, he became Minister of Fisheries and Oceans, and in 2002 he was appointed Minister of Natural Resources and Minister with political responsibility for British Columbia.

Dhaliwal was a firm supporter of Chrétien against Paul Martin's attempt to force the Liberal leader to retire. As a result, Martin's campaign team targeted Dhaliwal and successfully took over his riding association. Dhaliwal publicly denounced Martin's campaign team for this and criticized them for restricting access to Liberal Party membership forms. When Chrétien announced his resignation, Dhaliwal briefly considered running in the 2003 Liberal leadership campaign, but decided against it. Several months later, he endorsed Martin for leader and said he would be willing to serve in a Martin cabinet. However, on 3 December 2003, he announced that he would not be running for re-election.

== Business ==
After graduating from the University of British Columbia with a Bachelor of Commerce degree, he started a maintenance company out of his basement. He is a top level executive of Dynamic Facility Services Ltd. He became a self-made millionaire with diversified business interests including transportation, maintenance and real estate development.

Dhaliwal is chairman of National Green Biomed Ltd., a medical marijuana producer that donated $1 million in 2015 for health research into medical cannabis at the University of British Columbia. He spoke about decriminalization of cannabis by the Justin Trudeau federal government.

== Return to politics ==
In September 2024, Dhaliwal attempted to register a new provincial political party named the "New Liberal Party of BC", in order to replace BC United, which suspended its campaign in the month prior, as a centrist option for voters, according to himself. Yet, Elections BC refused the name of the new political party, citing confusion as a reason.

== Personal life ==
Born in India at Chaheru, Distt. Kapurthala Punjab in 1952, Dhaliwal's family emigrated to Vancouver when he was six. He attended John Oliver Secondary School, graduating in 1972.

Dhaliwal is married to Amrit Kaur. He has two daughters and a son.

== Election results ==
2000 Canadian federal election
Party	Candidate	Votes	%	±%	Expenditures
Liberal	Herb Dhaliwal	17,705	42.69	+0.04	$58,673
Alliance	Ron Jack	15,384	37.09	+7.38	$28,116
New Democratic	Herschel Hardin	3,848	9.27	-9.86	$13,583
Progressive Conservative	Dan Tidball	2,649	6.38	+0.44	$2,621
Green	Imtiaz Popat	646	1.55	-0.07	$594
Independent	Michelle Jasmine Chang	465	1.12	–	
Canadian Action	Adam Sealey	430	1.03	–	
Independent	Derrick O'Keefe	158	0.38	–	$317
Marxist–Leninist	Charles Boylan	101	0.24	-0.11	$600
Natural Law	Prince Pabbies	81	0.19	-0.38	
Total valid votes		41,467	100.0		
Total rejected ballots		288	0.69		
Turnout		41,755	58.38		
Liberal hold		Swing		-3.67	
Change for the Canadian Alliance is compared to the Reform Party.

1997 Canadian federal election
Party	Candidate	Votes	%	Expenditures
Liberal	Herb Dhaliwal	16,648	42.65	$54,591
Reform	Doug Hargrove	11,598	29.71	$23,380
New Democratic	Herschel Hardin	7,467	19.13	$35,574
Progressive Conservative	Don Couch	2,321	5.94	$18,037
Green	Cyndi Thompson	633	1.62	
Natural Law	Carolyn Grayson	224	0.57	
Marxist–Leninist	Allan Bezanson	138	0.35	
Total valid votes		39,029	100.0	
Total rejected ballots		281	0.71	
Turnout		39,310	64.22	
This riding was created from parts of Vancouver South and New Westminster—Burnaby, which elected a Liberal and a Reform candidate, respectively, in the previous election. Herb Dhaliwal was the incumbent from Vancouver South.

1993 Canadian federal election
Party	Candidate	Votes	%	±%
Liberal	Herb Dhaliwal	17,215	35.62	+6.83
Reform	Gordon Shreeve	12,291	25.43	+23.34
Progressive Conservative	K. K. Wan	11,357	23.50	-18.73
New Democratic	John Maté	3,625	7.50	-16.26
National	Cameron Ward	2,113	4.37	–
Libertarian	John Clarke	554	1.15	-0.74
Green	Valerie Jerome	418	0.86	+0.21
Natural Law	Prince Pabbies	285	0.59	–
Independent	Jas Mangat	278	0.58	–
Independent	Dan Logan	69	0.14	–
Independent	Robert Walter Ross	60	0.12	–
Marxist–Leninist	Allan H. Bezanson	47	0.10	–
Independent	Issam Mansour	20	0.04	–
Total valid votes		48,332	100.0	
Liberal gain from Progressive Conservative		Swing		-8.26

Parliament of Canada
Preceded by John Allen Fraser; 1972–1993	Member of Parliament for Vancouver South (called Vancouver South—Burnaby 1996–2003); 1993–2004	Succeeded by Ujjal Dosanjh; 2004–2011
