= Peter Liba =

Canadian politician (1940–2007)

The Honourable Peter Liba CM OM

22nd Lieutenant Governor of Manitoba
- In office March 2, 1999 – June 30, 2004
- Monarch: Elizabeth II
- Governors General: Roméo LeBlanc; Adrienne Clarkson
- Premier: Gary Filmon; Gary Doer
- Preceded by: Yvon Dumont
- Succeeded by: John Harvard

Personal details
- Born: Peter Michael Liba; May 10, 1940 Winnipeg, Manitoba, Canada
- Died: June 21, 2007 (aged 67) Lake of the Woods, Canada
- Spouse: Shirley Ann Collett (m. 1963)
- Profession: Journalist, businessman

Peter Michael Liba CM OM (May 10, 1940 – June 21, 2007) was a Canadian journalist, businessman and 22nd Lieutenant Governor of Manitoba.

== Biography ==
Liba was born in Winnipeg, and began his journalistic career working for the Portage la Prairie Daily Telegraph and the Neepawa Press. He joined the Winnipeg Tribune in 1960, and became its city editor in 1967. An executive assistant to the leadership of the Manitoba Liberal Party between 1968 and 1973, working under Gildas Molgat, Robert Bend and Israel Asper, in 1974 he joined Asper's CanWest group of companies, eventually becoming president and CEO of CKND-TV in Manitoba and SaskWest TV in Saskatchewan. He served on the Board of Directors of Atomic Energy of Canada from 1981 to 1986 with Marc Lalonde.

In 1993 he was appointed executive vice-president of CanWest Global Communications Corp and was promoted to executive director of corporate affairs in 1997. He also served two terms as chairman of the Canadian Association of Broadcasters, and was also president of the Western Association of Broadcasters and the Broadcasters Association of Manitoba. President of his own company, Peli Ventures Inc., from 1975 he was actively involved in several social and philanthropic groups in the Winnipeg area. In 1984 Liba was appointed a member of the Order of Canada and in 1998 was inducted into the Canadian Association of Broadcasters Hall of Fame.

The appointment as Manitoba's lieutenant-governor may have been, in part, a reflection of Canadian prime minister Jean Chrétien's friendship with Israel Asper. The position is largely ceremonial, and Liba had very little influence over the governments of Gary Filmon and Gary Doer. Liba was made the first member of the Order of Manitoba in 1999, and received the Queen Elizabeth II's Golden Jubilee Medal in 2004. He stepped down as lieutenant-governor just before the federal election of 2004, and was replaced by outgoing Liberal MP John Harvard.

Liba died on June 21, 2007, at his cottage at Lake of the Woods.

== Arms ==
Coat of arms of Peter Liba

Adopted
July 29, 1999
Crest
Out of a coronet the upper rim set with hearts Azure three ostrich plumes Or
Escutcheon
Per saltire Azure and Or in chief and base a horseshoe enclosing a cross pattee set upon the arch with a like cross and in either flank a doe passant all counterchanged
Supporters
On either side a buffalo Or winged Bleu Celeste gorged with a circlet the upper rim set with maple leaves Gules alternating with prairie crocus flowers Purpure
Compartment
A grassy mound Vert
Motto
MAKE A DIFFERENCE
Orders
The ribbon and insignia of a Companion of the Order of Canada.
DESIDERANTES MELIOREM PATRIAM (They desire a better country)
