= David A. Dodge =

Governor of the Bank of Canada from 2001 to 2008

David A. Dodge OC FRSC
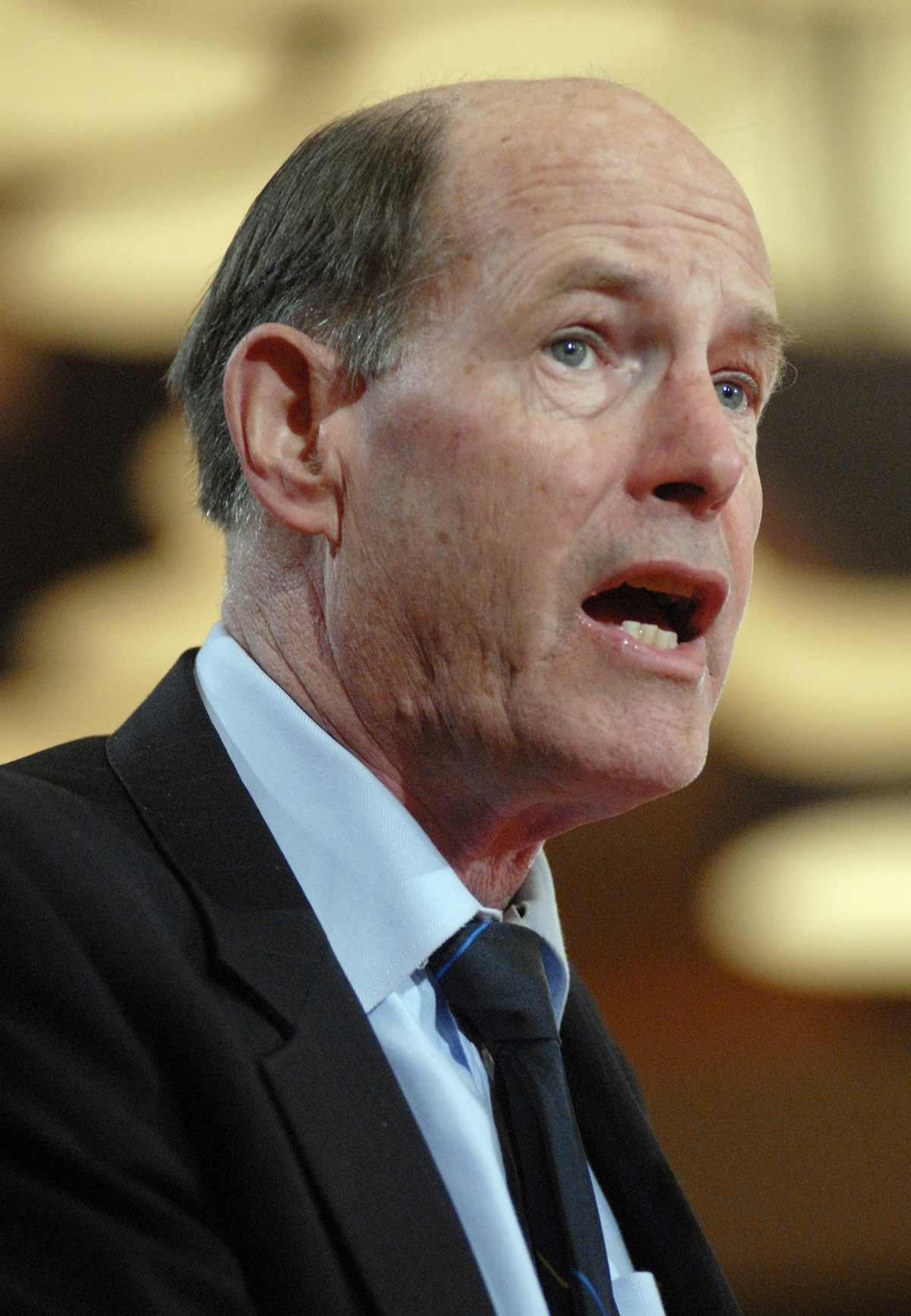

7th Governor of the Bank of Canada
- In office February 1, 2001 – January 31, 2008
- Appointed by: Chrétien Ministry
- Preceded by: Gordon Thiessen
- Succeeded by: Mark Carney

Deputy Minister of Health
- In office July 1, 1998 – January 5, 2001
- Minister: Allan Rock
- Preceded by: Michèle Jean
- Succeeded by: Ian Green

Deputy Minister of Finance
- In office August 1, 1992 – July 13, 1997
- Minister: Don Mazankowski; Gilles Loiselle; Paul Martin
- Preceded by: Fred Gorbet
- Succeeded by: C. Scott Clark

Personal details
- Born: June 8, 1943 (age 83) Toronto, Ontario
- Education: Queen's University (B.A.); Princeton University (Ph.D.)
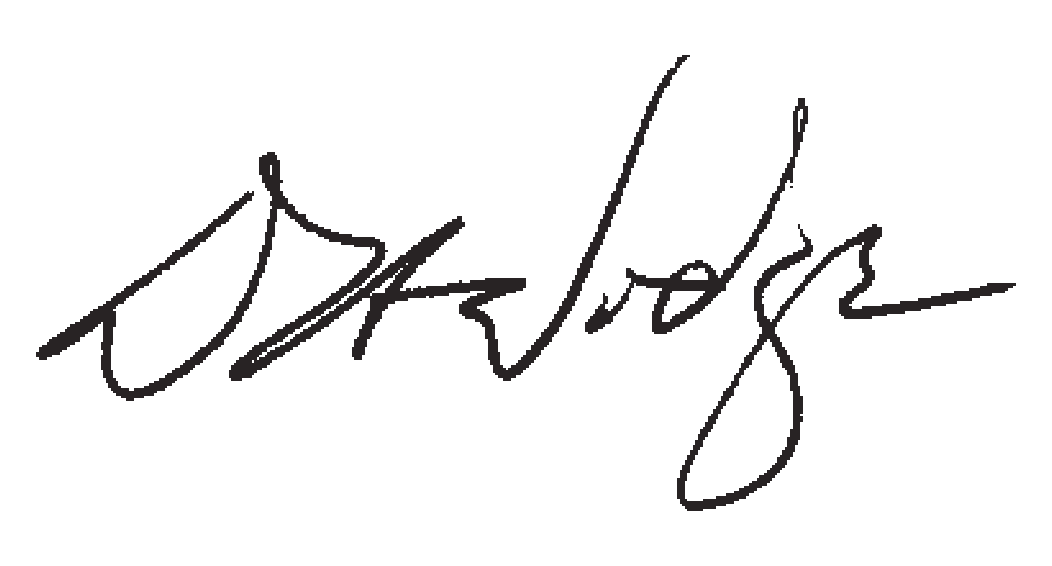
- Signature

David Allison Dodge OC FRSC (born June 8, 1943) is a Canadian economist. He served as the seventh governor of the Bank of Canada from 2001 to 2008.

== Early life ==
Dodge was born in Toronto, Ontario, Canada in 1943. He attended Ridley College, a private boarding school in St. Catharines (and second alumnus to become Bank Governor), and graduated from Queen's University with an honours degree in economics. He received his Ph.D in economics from Princeton University in 1972 after completing a doctoral dissertation titled "The structure of earnings of Canadian accountants, engineers and scientists and the implications for returns to investment in university education."

== Career ==
He was Assistant Professor of Economics at Queen's University, Associate Professor of Canadian Studies and International Economics at the School of Advanced International Studies at Johns Hopkins University, Senior Fellow in the Faculty of Commerce at the University of British Columbia, and visiting professor in the Department of Economics at Simon Fraser University. He has also served as Director of the International Economics Program of the Institute for Research on Public Policy.

=== Canadian Politics ===
Dodge served in the senior ranks of the Canadian federal government from 1992 to January 2001—one month before his appointment as Governor of the Bank of Canada.

==== Deputy Minister of Finance ====
He was appointed Deputy Minister of Finance in 1992. In the 1996 book Double Vision, Edward Greenspon and Anthony Wilson-Smith describe in detail the role which Dodge played in reviving Canada's economy by working closely with Finance Minister Paul Martin to eliminate the federal budget's deficit spending.

==== Deputy Minister of Health ====
In 1998, Dodge was appointed the Deputy Minister of Health. While Deputy, Dodge's role in founding the Winnipeg National Microbiology Laboratory was commended as critically important by laboratory director-general Frank Plummer.

=== Bank of Canada ===
In 2001, Dodge was appointed the Governor of the Bank of Canada. His appointment was controversial as the Bank of Canada traditionally promotes from within, helping to avoid the perception of politicizing of the central bank. During Dodge's term, annual inflation stayed close to the Bank of Canada's target of 2 percent, and the Canadian economy avoided any recessions. In 2008, Dodge retired from the Bank of Canada, and was replaced by Mark Carney.

Following his exit from the Bank, Dodge joined the Canadian law firm Bennett Jones as a senior advisor. As of 2026, Dodge is no longer employed at Bennett Jones.

=== Chancellor of Queen's University ===
Dodge was elected as the 13th chancellor of Queen's University on May 2, 2008, succeeding A. Charles Baillie. The appointment was effective July 1, 2008, though Dodge was only officially installed later that year, on October 30. As his first three-year term drew to a close, Dodge's re-appointment was unanimously endorsed by the Queen's University Council, and Dodge served until his retirement at the end of his second-term on June 30, 2014. He was subsequently appointed chancellor emeritus by the University Council, an honorary title he still holds today.

Dodge was elected to the Royal Society of Canada in October 2009.

He was made an Officer of the Order of Canada in 2007.

Academic offices
Preceded by A. Charles Baillie	Chancellor of Queen's University; 2008—2014	Succeeded by James Leech
