= James Kinley =

Lieutenant governor of Nova Scotia from 1994 to 2000

The Honourable James Kinley ONS CD

29th Lieutenant Governor of Nova Scotia
- In office June 23, 1994 – May 17, 2000
- Monarch: Elizabeth II
- Governors General: Ray Hnatyshyn; Roméo LeBlanc; Adrienne Clarkson
- Premier: John Savage; Russell MacLellan; John Hamm
- Preceded by: Lloyd Crouse
- Succeeded by: Myra Freeman

Personal details
- Born: 23 September 1925 Lunenburg, Nova Scotia, Canada
- Died: 1 May 2012 (aged 86) Lunenburg, Nova Scotia, Canada
- Spouse: Grace Kinley
- Profession: Professional engineer, businessman

John James Kinley ONS CD (23 September 1925 – 1 May 2012) was a Canadian engineer, industrialist and the 29th Lieutenant Governor of Nova Scotia since confederation.

== Early life and education ==
Kinley was born on 23 September 1925 in Lunenburg, Nova Scotia, the son of politician John James Kinley and Lila Evelyn Kinley (Young). He was a Sea Cadet and then joined the navy at 18, serving with the Canadian Merchant Navy and the Royal Canadian Navy in World War II before attending college.

Kinley was an engineering graduate of Dalhousie University, Nova Scotia Technical College and a Master of Engineering and Business Administration from the Massachusetts Institute of Technology.

== Career ==
Kinley has practiced professional engineering in business and the community for more than 50 years in executive positions at Lunenburg Foundry & Engineering Co. Ltd. and Lunenburg Marine Railway. He was the Honorary Chair for Life of the Nova Scotia Branch of the Canadian Manufacturers and Exporters, a former chair the Offshore Trade Association of Nova Scotia and a former director of the Canadian Foundry Association.

Kinley served in a number of military offices. He served in the Canadian Merchant Marine and Royal Canadian Navy and in Canada's Naval Reserve and Retired as Lieutenant Commander in 1958. He was a president of Branch #23, Royal Canadian Legion in Lunenburg, former president of the Navy League of Canada, Honorary Colonel of the #14 Airfield Engineering Squadron, Canadian Air Force and the West Nova Scotia Regiment. He was appointed the first Grand President of The Nova Scotia Command, Royal Canadian Legion.

Kinley ran for the House of Commons as a Liberal in the 1968, 1972, and 1980 general elections in the district of South Shore.

== Lieutenant Governor of Nova Scotia ==
Kinley was appointed by the Governor General, on the advice of Prime Minister Jean Chrétien, in May 1994. He was installed at a public ceremony at the World Trade and Convention Center in Halifax, Nova Scotia on June 23, 1994. He was sworn into office by Premier John Savage, Chief Justice Lorne Clarke and federal representatives for Governor General Ramon Hnatyshyn.

== Personal life and death ==
Kinley was a longtime resident of Lunenburg with his wife Grace Elizabeth (MacPherson) Kinley and have raised four children; Paula, Peter, Edward, Shona and are grandparents of eleven grandchildren.

Kinley died at the age of 86 in Lunenburg, Nova Scotia on 1 May 2012.

== Honours ==
- Sir John Kennedy Medal; Engineering Institute of Canada
- Centennial Gold Medal, 100 years of Tech, TUNS and Dalhousie University, 2007
- Member of the Duke of Edinburgh's first Study Conference "Human Problems of Industrial Communities within the Commonwealth and Empire" Oxford in 1956, attended the 50th Anniversary Reunion at Buckingham Palace, London, May 2006.
- Fellow Engineering Institute of Canada
- Fellow of the Canadian Academy of Engineers
- Fellow of Canadian Society of Engineers
- Honorary Doctor of Engineering, Dalhousie University 1995
- Grand Commander of the Royal Norwegian Medal of Honour
- Knight of Grace, Knight of Justice and Vice Prior Order of Saint John of Jerusalem

== Coat of arms ==
Coat of arms of James Kinley
Notes The arms of James Kinley consist of: Crest Upon a helmet mantled Azure doubled Or within a wreath of these colours a beaver sejeant rampant Or armed Gules wearing a coronet erablé and holding between its forepaws a small stump Or issuant from tufts of grass Vert and sprouting two maple leaves Gules. Escutcheon Argent a saltire Azure surmounted by an escutcheon Or charged with a Lunenburg schooner Azure sails Argent the whole between in chief an annulet Sable in fess two anchors also Sable the dexter fouled Or and in base a triple bladed propeller Sable garnished Or. Supporters Dexter an osprey Argent beaked and membered Or armed Gules wearing a coronet Or set above alternately with maple leaves Gules and mayflowers proper sinister a dolphin Argent finned and tailed Or wearing a like coronet. Compartment A grassy mound Vert set with mayflowers proper impaling waves of the sea Azure crested Argent. Motto Progress With Stability
