= Arthur Maxwell House =

Canadian politician

The Honourable Arthur Maxwell House OC

10th Lieutenant Governor of Newfoundland and Labrador
- In office February 5, 1997 – November 1, 2002
- Monarch: Elizabeth II
- Governors General: Roméo LeBlanc; Adrienne Clarkson
- Premier: Brian Tobin; Beaton Tulk; Roger Grimes
- Preceded by: Frederick Russell
- Succeeded by: Edward Roberts

Personal details
- Born: August 10, 1926 Glovertown, Dominion of Newfoundland
- Died: October 17, 2013 (aged 87) St. John's, Newfoundland and Labrador
- Awards: Order of Canada

Arthur Maxwell House, OC (August 10, 1926 – October 17, 2013) was a Canadian neurologist and the tenth lieutenant governor of Newfoundland and Labrador.

Born in Glovertown, Newfoundland, he graduated from medical school at Dalhousie University in 1952. He then specialized in neurology, at the Montreal Neurological Institute, and between 1959 and 1966 was the only neurologist in the province.

In the 1970s, House became pioneer of telehealth by offering telephone consultations with patients in remote areas of the province.

He had helped to establish the medical school at Memorial University of Newfoundland and worked for thirty years there as a professor of neurology. He also held several administrative positions there and he retired in 1993.

In 1997, he was appointed Lieutenant-Governor of Newfoundland and Labrador.

In 1989, he was made a Member of the Order of Canada and was promoted to Officer in 2005.

He died at St. John's in 2013.

Coat of arms of Arthur Maxwell House

Crest
Issuant from a coronet érablé Gules the circlet bearing a band Or charged with saltires wavy Sable a sea-lion Azure queued Argent wearing a coronet érablé bearing in the dexter forepaw a reflex hammer and in the sinister forepaw a closed book all Or charged with a cross moline Gules.
Escutcheon
Azure on a Canadian pale Gules fimbriated Argent a communications satellite above an arc of the globe showing Newfoundland all Or.
Supporters
On rocks proper rising above barry wavy Argent and Azure dexter a Newfoundland dog Sable gorged with a collar of pitcher plant flowers Or pendant therefrom a ship's wheel Argent supporting a staff Argent flying therefrom a pennant Azure charged with three lightning flashes in fess Or sinister a caribou also Or unguled and attired Azure gorged with a collar of pitcher plant flowers Gules pendant therefrom a ship's wheel Azure.
Motto
Vision Loyalty Commitment
