= Lise Thibault =

Canadian politician (born 1939)

The Honourable Lise Thibault
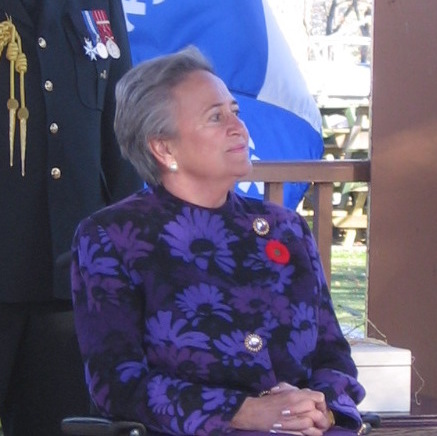
- Thibault in 2006

27th Lieutenant Governor of Quebec
- In office 30 January 1997 – 7 June 2007
- Monarch: Elizabeth II
- Governors General: Roméo LeBlanc; Adrienne Clarkson; Michaëlle Jean
- Premier: Lucien Bouchard; Bernard Landry; Jean Charest
- Preceded by: Jean-Louis Roux
- Succeeded by: Pierre Duchesne

Personal details
- Born: 2 April 1939 (age 87) Saint-Roch-de-l'Achigan, Quebec, Canada
- Spouse: René Thibault
- Parent(s): Paul Trudel; Laurenza Wolfe
- Education: Cégep de Saint-Jérôme
- Profession: Civil servant, Teacher, Journalist

Lise Thibault DStJ (French pronunciation: [liz tibo]; born 2 April 1939) is a Canadian politician who served as the 27th Lieutenant Governor of Quebec from 1997 to 2007. She later spent six months in jail for misuse of public funds, which she was ordered to repay the government. As of 2026, she is the only Canadian vice-regal representative to have been incarcerated.

== Early life ==
Born in Saint-Roch-de-l'Achigan, Quebec, she was the eldest daughter of Paul Trudel and Laurenza Wolfe. She was educated at the Académie Marie-Anne de Montréal, and then went on to teachers' college at Cégep de Saint-Jérôme. She married René Thibault in 1959. Thibault was permanently disabled in a tobogganing accident as a teenager, and uses a wheelchair.

== Career ==
Thibault taught with the adult education department of the Milles-Îles and Des Écores school boards from 1973 to 1978. She worked for Télé-Métropole from 1977 to 1981. From 1982 to 1984 she was a host and researcher at the Canadian Broadcasting Corporation as for programs about family and community issues. She was the vice president for Quebec's Commission de la santé et de la sécurité du travail (CSST) from 1987 to 1993. She was president and CEO of the Office des personnes handicapées du Québec from 1993 to 1995.

She was closely associated with the federal Liberal Party for many years, and on the advice of Prime Minister Jean Chrétien, the Governor General appointed her Lieutenant-Governor of Quebec, following the resignation of Jean-Louis Roux in 1997. She became Quebec's first female viceroy, and the first disabled lieutenant governor in Canada. In February 2005, Thibault had a stroke. She was one of the longest serving lieutenant governors in Canadian history, serving for over ten years.

== Trial and imprisonment for fraud ==
Beginning in 2007, Thibault was accused of spending beyond the limits of her expense account. Questions on her spending continued after her departure, with federal and provincial auditors general pointing to $700,000 in unjustified expenses. Among the expenses were:

- $45,000 for "gifts" without the names of recipients.
- $24,000 to transport her official van to the United States while she was on vacation, rather than renting a car there.
- $12,000 to the provincial air service for a one-day fishing trip in the Gaspe region.
- $44,000 in "tips" paid by her bodyguards during hotel stays and sporting activities.

The files were turned over to the Sûreté du Québec (SQ) and Royal Canadian Mounted Police (RCMP) for investigation. She was criminally charged for offences involving fraud, breach of trust, forgery and fabrication of false documents related to the misspending of public funds during her ten years in office. Thibault's lawyer argued unsuccessfully in Quebec Superior Court that Thibault should receive sovereign immunity, because "the Crown's prosecution cannot prosecute the Crown"—referring to her prior office as the Queen's representative in Quebec.

In September 2015 she was sentenced to 18 months in jail and was ordered to repay the government $300,000 ($200,000 to Ottawa and $100,000 to Québec) after pleading guilty to fraud and breach of trust in 2014. Judge Carol St-Cyr outlined her crimes, pointing out that she "took advantage of holes in the system and abused her position of authority to pay for trips, golf lessons and birthday parties... [and] forgot that her role as lieutenant governor was to be a good example for Quebecers."

On 24 February 2016, the Quebec Court of Appeal upheld Thibault's 18-month sentence, and the next day Thibault surrendered at the Quebec City Detention Centre. She was transferred in late February 2016 to the Leclerc Detention Centre in Laval, Quebec. She was granted a conditional release on 2 June 2016, and was fully discharged on 17 August 2017. In the meantime, she filed for bankruptcy in June of that year, citing of debt of $1.5 million to Canada Revenue Agency and Revenu Québec (the initial $300,000 she was ordered to pay had already been reimbursed).

== Honours ==
As a former viceregal representative of Elizabeth II, as Queen in Right of Quebec, Thibault is styled The Honourable for life.

Thibault has received three honorary degrees:

Province/State	Date	School	Degree
Quebec	November 1999	Concordia University	Doctor of Laws (LL.D)
Quebec	2 June 2001	Bishop's University	Doctor of Civil Law (DCL)
Massachusetts	2003	Anna Maria College	Doctor of Laws (LL.D)

=== Arms ===
Coat of arms of Lise Thibault
Notes The arms of Lise Thibault consist of: Crest Upon a helmet mantled Azure doubled Argent within a wreath of these colours upon a grassy mound Vert an oak tree Argent fructed Azure. Escutcheon Azure between two quills in chief and a treble clef in base a swallow volant Argent holding in the beak a Blue Flag Or. Supporters Two does Azure and Argent gorged with maple leaves Or pendant therefrom a bezant the dexter one charged with two ears of wheat the sinister one with two sprigs of flax one bearing two flowers the other four all Azure. Compartment A grassy mound Vert bearing lilies between two maple leaves Or. Motto Créer La Vie
