= Lyle Vanclief =

Canadian politician

The Honourable Lyle Vanclief PC

Member of Parliament for Prince Edward—Hastings
- In office 21 November 1988 – 28 June 2004
- Preceded by: Jack Ellis
- Succeeded by: Daryl Kramp

Minister of Agriculture and Agri-Food
- In office 11 June 1997 – 12 December 2003
- Preceded by: Ralph Goodale
- Succeeded by: Bob Speller

Personal details
- Born: 19 September 1943 (age 82) Ameliasburg, Ontario
- Party: Liberal Party of Canada
- Profession: Agrologist

Lyle Vanclief, PC (born 19 September 1943) is a former politician who served as Canada's Minister of Agriculture from 1997 to 2003.

== Early life ==
Vanclief was born in Ameliasburg, Ontario. He graduated in the class of 1967 from the University of Guelph with a Bachelor of Science in Agriculture degree.

== Political career ==
Vanclief was first elected to the House of Commons of Canada as a Liberal Member of Parliament representing the rural Ontario riding of Prince Edward—Hastings in 1988.

In October 1993, Vanclief was re-elected to the 36th Canadian Parliament.

In June 1997, Vanclief was named Canadian Minister of Agriculture and Agri-Food after his election to the 36th Canadian Parliament.

Paul Martin became prime minister in 2003 and did not include Vanclief in Cabinet. Vanclief did not run for re-election in the 2004 election.

Vanclief supported Stéphane Dion for the leadership of the Liberal Party.

== Family ==
Vanclief married Sharon, with whom he has two children.
