= Marilyn Trenholme Counsell =

Canadian lecturer, doctor and politician (1933–2026)

The Honourable Marilyn Trenholme Counsell OC ONB

28th Lieutenant Governor of New Brunswick
- In office April 18, 1997 – August 26, 2003
- Monarch: Elizabeth II
- Governors General: Roméo LeBlanc; Adrienne Clarkson
- Premier: Frank McKenna; Ray Frenette; Camille Thériault; Bernard Lord
- Preceded by: Margaret McCain
- Succeeded by: Herménégilde Chiasson

MLA for Tantramar
- In office October 13, 1987 – April 18, 1997
- Preceded by: Robert Arthur Hall
- Succeeded by: Peter Mesheau

Senator for New Brunswick
- In office September 9, 2003 – October 22, 2008
- Nominated by: Jean Chrétien

Personal details
- Born: Marilyn Trenholme; October 22, 1933 Baie Verte, New Brunswick, Canada
- Died: June 17, 2026 (aged 92) Sackville, New Brunswick, Canada
- Party: Liberal
- Spouse: Kenneth Walter Counsell (m. 1972)
- Children: Giles Baxter Counsell, Lorna Joy Counsell
- Education: Mount Allison University; University of Toronto
- Occupation: Physician, nutritionist

Marilyn Trenholme Counsell OC ONB (October 22, 1933 – June 17, 2026) was a Canadian lecturer, doctor and politician. Counsell was a Canadian Senator and Lieutenant Governor of New Brunswick from 1997 to 2003.

== Early life and career ==
Counsell was born in Baie Verte, New Brunswick on October 22, 1933, the daughter of Harry Frederick and Mildred (née Baxter) Trenholme. She married Kenneth Walter Counsell in 1972; they had two children, Giles Baxter Counsell and Lorna Joy Counsell. Kenneth Counsell died in 1981.

She had a BSc from Mount Allison University, an MA in nutrition from the University of Toronto and an MD from the University of Toronto. She worked first as a nutritionist for the Governments of New Brunswick and Ontario, and following her MD as a family physician at the Toronto General Hospital, and in Sackville and Port Elgin, New Brunswick.

Counsell was elected member of the Legislative Assembly of New Brunswick for Tantramar in the 1987 General Election and reelected in 1991 and 1995. During this time, from 1994 to 1997, she also served in the cabinet as Minister of State for the Family and Minister of State for Family and Community Services.

=== Lieutenant-Governor of New Brunswick ===
Counsell served as the 28th Lieutenant Governor of New Brunswick from 1997–2003. During her tenure, she reopened Old Government House, as "The People's House", and focused on early childhood literacy.

=== Senator ===
Counsell was appointed to the Senate in 2003 by Governor General Adrienne Clarkson, on the advice of Prime Minister Jean Chrétien, and sat as a member of the Liberal caucus. As a Senator, she was an advocate for literacy, health and early childhood development. She reached the mandatory retirement age on October 22, 2008. In 2008, she began lecturing on Political Leadership in Canada at Mount Allison University. She was named to the Order of New Brunswick (ONB) that year (2008).

== Death ==
Counsell died on June 17, 2026, at the age of 92.

== Honours and awards ==
In 1994 on behalf of the Province of New Brunswick she received a UN Year of the Family award. As the Lieutenant-Governor of New Brunswick, she was made a Dame Commander of the Order of St. John (DStJ). In June 2012, she was made an Officer of the Order of Canada (OC). She received honorary degrees from l'Université de Moncton, Mount Allison and University of New Brunswick and was also honoured with the Sir Charles Tupper Award for Political Action (CMA) and the Champion of Public Education Award (TLP).

== Arms ==
Coat of arms of Marilyn Trenholme Counsell
| Notes The arms of Marilyn Trenholme Counsell consist of: Crest Upon a helmet mantled Azure doubled Or within a wreath of these colours issuant from a coronet rim Or the upper edge set with roses Argent alternating with thistle flowers Or a demi white-tailed deer proper gorged with a coronet érablé charged on the shoulder with a mullet and bearing between its legs a bolt of lightning all Or. Escutcheon Azure issuant in base a pile barry wavy Vert and Argent fimbriated and charged with a rod of Aescalapius Or in chief two open books Argent bound Or. Supporters Dexter a yellow labrador Or gorged with a collar of birch bark proper fimbriated Vert sinister a mare Or unguled and maned Azure gorged with a like collar. Compartment A grassy mound Vert set with roses Or leaved Vert and marsh violets Purpure leaved Vert above barry wavy of three Argent Azure and Argent. Motto Joyful Joyful We Adore Thee |
