= Gordon Thiessen =

Governor of the Bank of Canada from 1994 to 2001

Gordon G. Thiessen

6th Governor of the Bank of Canada
- In office February 1, 1994 – January 31, 2001
- Appointed by: Chrétien Ministry
- Preceded by: John Crow
- Succeeded by: David A. Dodge

Personal details
- Born: August 14, 1938 (age 88) South Porcupine, Ontario
- Spouse: Annette Thiessen (née Hillyar)
- Children: 2
- Education: University of Saskatchewan; London School of Economics

Gordon George Thiessen, OC (born August 14, 1938) is an economist and banker who was the sixth governor of the Bank of Canada from 1994 to 2001, succeeding John Crow. He was succeeded by David A. Dodge.

Thiessen was born in South Porcupine, Ontario and raised in Saskatchewan.

Thiessen studied economics at the University of Saskatchewan and received an Honours BA in 1960 and an MA in 1961. He taught economics for a year and then joined the Bank of Canada in 1963. From 1965 to 1967 he attended the London School of Economics, from which he received his Ph.D in Economics in 1972.

At the Bank of Canada, Thiessen was appointed Adviser to the Governor in 1979, Deputy Governor in 1984, and Senior Deputy Governor in 1987.

In 1996, he received the government of Sweden's Order of the Polar Star in recognition of the assistance provided by the Bank of Canada to the Swedish Central Bank (Sveriges Riksbank) to assist them in developing their policy framework for combating inflation when the Swedish Krona was first floated in January 1993.

In 1997, Thiessen received an honorary Doctor of Laws (LL.D) degree from the University of Saskatchewan.

On September 25, 2001, Thiessen was elected to the IPSCO Board of Directors. On February 1, 2002, Thiessen was elected to the Manulife Financial Board of Directors.

In 2002, he was made an Officer of the Order of Canada. In 2002, he received the Queen's Golden Jubilee Medal, and in 2012, he received the Queen's Diamond Jubilee Medal.
