= Sheila Copps =

Canadian politician (born 1952)

The Honourable Sheila Copps PC OC
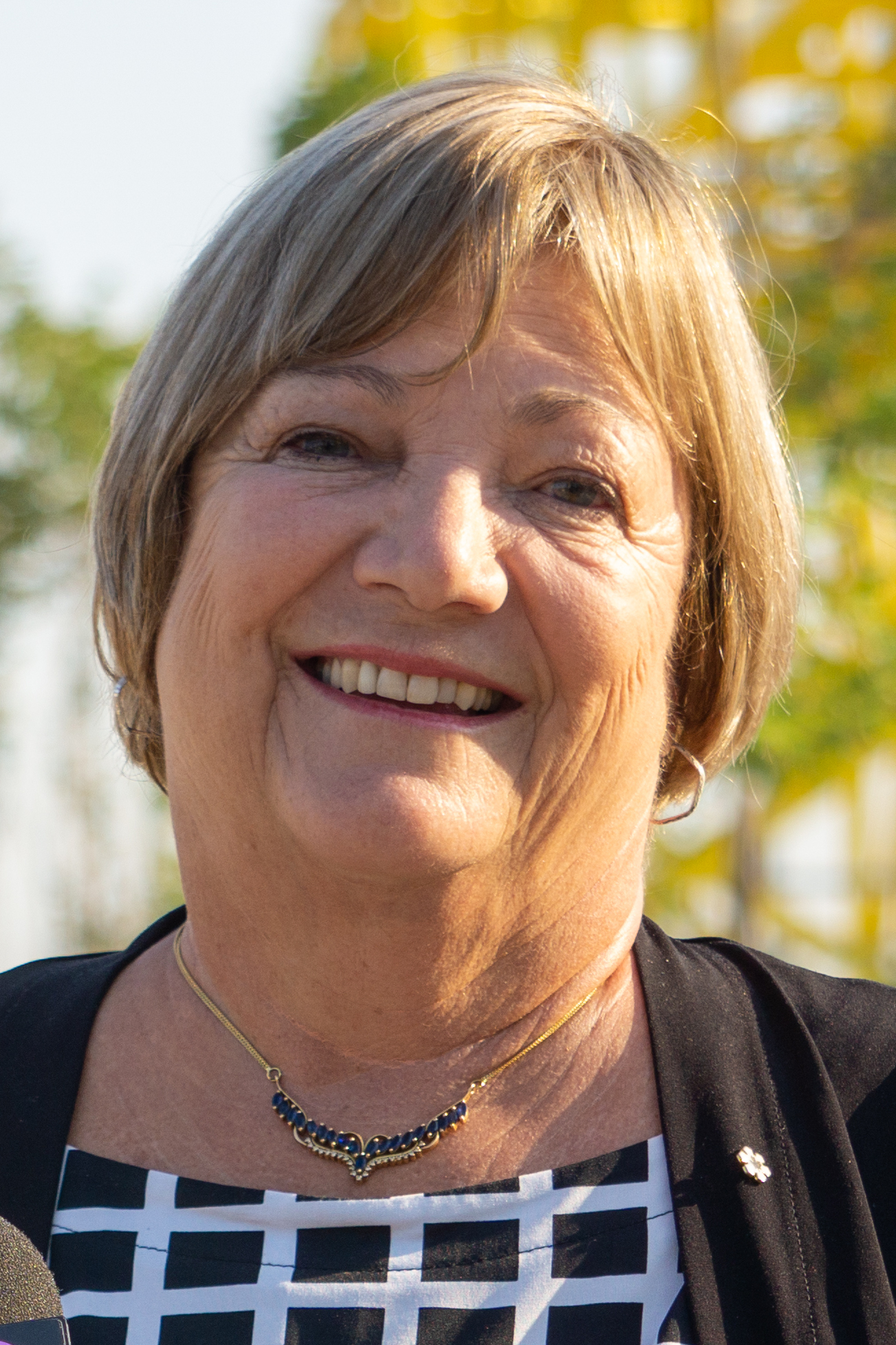
- Copps in 2022

6th Deputy Prime Minister of Canada
- In office November 4, 1993 – June 11, 1997 (Note: There was no deputy prime minister from April to June 1996 when Copps, after being challenged on her 1993 campaign promise to resign if the government did not repeal the Goods and Services Tax, resigned from Parliament and recontested her seat in a byelection. Chrétien did not name a replacement during Copps's absence from Parliament. After winning the byelection and returning to Parliament, Copps was reappointed to the position.)
- Prime Minister: Jean Chrétien
- Preceded by: Jean Charest
- Succeeded by: Herb Gray

Minister of Canadian Heritage (Note: Copps was Minister of Multiculturalism and Citizenship from January to July 1996 when the position was merged with Minister of Communications, to form Minister of Canadian Heritage. Michel Dupuy was the previous minister of Multiculturalism and Citizenship.)
- In office July 12, 1996 – December 11, 2003
- Prime Minister: Jean Chrétien
- Preceded by: Position established
- Succeeded by: Hélène Scherrer

Minister of the Environment
- In office November 4, 1993 – January 24, 1996
- Prime Minister: Jean Chrétien
- Preceded by: Pierre H. Vincent
- Succeeded by: Sergio Marchi

Member of Parliament for Hamilton East
- In office September 4, 1984 – May 23, 2004 (Note: Copps resigned her seat in April 1996, and recontested her seat in the byelection two months later, which she won.)
- Preceded by: John Munro
- Succeeded by: Riding abolished

Member of the Ontario Provincial Parliament for Hamilton Centre
- In office March 19, 1981 – August 6, 1984
- Preceded by: Mike Davison
- Succeeded by: Mike Davison

Personal details
- Born: Sheila Maureen Copps; November 27, 1952 (age 73) Hamilton, Ontario, Canada
- Party: Liberal
- Spouse(s): Austin Thorne (?–present); Ric Marrero (1985–1990, div.); Bill Miller (?–?, div.)
- Children: Danelle (March, 1987)
- Parents: Victor Copps (father); Geraldine Florence Guthro (mother)
- Education: King's University College (BA)
- Profession: Journalist; politician

Sheila Maureen Copps PC OC (born November 27, 1952) is a former Canadian politician who also served as the sixth deputy prime minister of Canada from November 4, 1993, to April 30, 1996, and June 19, 1996, to June 11, 1997. Her father, Victor Copps, was once mayor of Hamilton, Ontario.

Considered a prominent left-wing member of the Liberal Party of Canada, Copps is an advocate for legal rights of women, marijuana legalization, minority rights, and protection of the environment. Her combative style and reputation for flamboyance were trademarks of her political career.

== Early life ==
Copps was born in Hamilton, Ontario. She is a second-generation member of a political family that has dominated Hamilton-area politics on the municipal, provincial and federal levels. Her mother, Geraldine Florence (Guthro) Copps, was a Hamilton city councillor. Her father, Victor Kennedy Copps, was mayor of the City of Hamilton. She attended Bishop Ryan Catholic Secondary School. As a child, Copps participated in Girl Guides of Canada youth programs.

She is married to Austin Thorne (her third husband), and has one daughter, Danelle (from her second marriage). She was the first sitting Member of Parliament in Canadian history to give birth while a member.

Copps earned a Bachelor of Arts degree in French and English from King's University College at the University of Western Ontario in London, Ontario, and pursued further studies at McMaster University in Hamilton and the University of Rouen in France. She worked as a newspaper journalist with the Hamilton Spectator and the Ottawa Citizen.

== Political career ==
Copps entered provincial politics in the 1977 provincial election, running for the Ontario Liberal Party in Hamilton Centre. She lost, finishing 14 votes behind incumbent New Democrat Mike Davison. Copps appeared on the ballot for this election as "Sheila Copps Miller", using the surname of her then-husband. In all subsequent campaigns, she would refer to herself as "Sheila Copps."

After working as a constituency assistant to party leader Stuart Smith for the next four years, Copps again ran in Hamilton Centre for the 1981 election. She defeated Davison by 2,804 votes, and joined thirty-three other Liberals in forming the Official Opposition to Premier William Davis's Progressive Conservative government. At the age of 29, Copps ran for the leadership of the Ontario Liberal Party in 1982 following Smith's resignation, and despite her lack of experience finished second against David Peterson.

Copps turned to national politics in the 1984 federal election, campaigning for the federal Liberals in the riding of Hamilton East. This election resulted in a landslide victory for Brian Mulroney and his Progressive Conservative Party, which won 211 out of 282 seats. Copps was personally elected, defeating New Democratic Party candidate David Christopherson by 2,661 votes, but had relatively few allies in the House of Commons for the next four years.

Copps proved to be an influential member of the small Liberal opposition. She became a prominent member of the "Rat Pack," a group of young Liberal MPs who made it their business to bring misery to the Mulroney government. Fully bilingual, she earned both praise and scorn for her spirited attacks on Mulroney and his ministers. Copps was noted for climbing over a desk in order to reach minister Sinclair Stevens at a committee meeting. She released her autobiography, Nobody's Baby, only two years into her federal career, and was by all accounts a rising star in Canadian politics. The book came after Minister of Justice John Crosbie told Copps to "just quieten [sic] down, baby" during a heated debate. Copps retorted, "I am nobody's baby."

In 1987, Copps became the first sitting MP in Canadian history to give birth, when her daughter Danelle was born. Later, Copps commented that she became part of her "entourage," making friends across the country. In 1988, Copps was re-elected without difficulty in the federal election.

Copps was a candidate in the 1990 Liberal leadership race to succeed John Turner. She finished third, behind Jean Chrétien and Paul Martin.

In 1992, Copps supported Murray Elston's unsuccessful bid to succeed David Peterson as leader of the Ontario Liberal Party.

=== Federal minister ===
The Liberals came to power in the 1993 election, defeating Kim Campbell's Tories. Chrétien became prime minister following the election, and named Copps as deputy prime minister and minister of the environment. This marked the first time in Canadian history that a woman had been named to the post of deputy prime minister. Following a 1996 cabinet shuffle, she relinquished the Environment portfolio and became Minister of Canadian Heritage. Around this time, Copps participated in the 1994 class of the World Economic Forum's Global Leaders of Tomorrow program alongside former Quebec Premier Jean Charest and World Bank natural gas leader Afsaneh Mashayekhi Beschloss.

Copps resigned briefly in the spring of 1996. One of Chrétien's campaign promises had been to abolish Brian Mulroney's highly unpopular Goods and Services Tax, a promise he later reneged on in an effort to avoid decreasing government revenues. During the 1993 election campaign, Copps promised during a Canadian Broadcasting Corporation "town hall" program that she would resign if the GST was not abolished. Copps, after some pressure, vacated her Hamilton East seat in 1996, and promptly ran again in the ensuing by-election.

During the by-election, Reform put up billboards around her riding, one featuring a pig at a trough with "SHEILA" marked on it; and another with her picture and, "Promise to cut the GST: It worked last time!" Copps won handily, though with a significantly reduced percentage of the vote from 1993, and Chrétien reinstated her to her previous cabinet posts. During her victory speech, she noted that the Liberals "kicked butt" in the by-election; a controversial editorial cartoon in the right-wing Toronto Sun tabloid the next day portrayed Hamilton East voters as "buttheads."

Following the 1997 election, Copps was removed from the position of deputy prime minister, which was given to political stalwart Herb Gray. Copps made little upward progress in cabinet after this demotion, and by many accounts came to have relatively little influence over the direction of government policy. Many believe that Anne McLellan surpassed her as the most prominent woman in government during this period.

=== 2003 leadership bid ===
Following Jean Chrétien's announcement of his intent to retire in February 2004, Copps became the first candidate to officially declare for the party leadership. Despite her efforts to build support among women, minority groups and the party's left-wing, she began and ended the leadership contest well behind the overwhelming favourite, Paul Martin. While her national campaigning saw her sign up over 32,000 new party members, some speculated that she would withdraw prior to the Liberal leadership convention, as John Manley had.

=== Nomination battle before 2004 federal election ===
Riding redistribution placed Copps in a serious nomination battle with another Liberal MP, Tony Valeri, who was named to Martin's cabinet as Minister of Transport. With redistribution, part of Valeri's Stoney Creek riding was merged with part of Copps's Hamilton East to create Hamilton East—Stoney Creek, while the remainder was merged with other neighbouring ridings to create Niagara West—Glanbrook. The remaining portion of Hamilton East was merged with parts of Hamilton West to create Hamilton Centre. Of the 115,709 constituents of the riding of Hamilton East—Stoney Creek, a slight majority of constituents (58,462) were from the old Stoney Creek while a minority (57,247) were from the old Hamilton East.

Copps's position was that Valeri should have sought the nomination in Niagara West—Glanbrook, where he resided, and where there was a regional airport that would complement his transport portfolio. Valeri's position was that the majority of his former Stoney Creek constituents lived in the new Hamilton East—Stoney Creek riding, Copps no longer lived in Hamilton and he resided less than 100 metres from the riding boundary.

In a December interview with Hamilton's CHCH-TV, Copps complained that Martin was trying to drive her, other women and other Martin opponents out of the Liberal caucus. Beth Phinney, who represented nearby Hamilton Mountain, offered to stand down in favour of Copps, but Copps turned this offer down. On January 14, 2004, she suggested that she could campaign for the New Democratic Party in the upcoming election if Valeri won the Liberal nomination. Copps later retracted this threat.

On March 6, 2004, Valeri defeated Copps by 2,802 votes to 2,491. Copps argued that there were improprieties in the nomination process and in the conduct of the vote, and called on various authorities to investigate (other nomination elections between Chrétien and Martin supporters had similar allegations of tampering). She initially appealed the vote results to the Liberal Party of Canada. Her appeal was late as it was filed beyond the 72-hour deadline after the commencement of the nomination meeting, but the Appeals Commission of the Liberal Party waived the deadline. Nevertheless, Copps dropped the appeal on March 29, alleging a lack of transparency in the process.

In July 2005, Hamilton police announced a formal end to the investigation after finding no evidence to substantiate Copps's allegations including tampering of her telephones on the day of the nomination. As the access codes to her phone system were apparently listed on a bulletin board, the police estimated that at least 40 individuals had access to the phone system.

== Post-political career ==
On May 14, 2004, Copps stood in the House of Commons of Canada and announced she would not run for re-election as an independent. She later suggested in comments to reporters that she might return to politics once Paul Martin was no longer prime minister. In her first public engagement after departing politics, she accepted a role in a Kingston, Ontario dinner theatre production of Steel Magnolias. She also guest-starred on the evening soap opera Train 48.

Her second autobiography, Worth Fighting For, was published by McClelland and Stewart in October 2004 and resulted in further public controversy with Paul Martin and other members of the Liberal Party. Copps alleged that Martin had put a pledge in his 1995 budget to rescind the "outdated" Canada Health Act and further claimed that her intervention had the offending line removed from the document. Her allegations were denied by Martin and David Dodge (who Copps claims faxed her the draft of the budget), Diane Marleau (who was Health Minister at the time), and others.

After leaving politics, Copps wrote regular commentary for the National Post. In September 2005, concurrent with a redesign, she was introduced as a regular columnist for the Toronto Sun and various Sun papers across Canada. Copps quit her column in December 2007.

She also hosted a weekly syndicated radio talk show, Weekends with Sheila Copps, focusing on lifestyle issues such as health and financial planning. She succeeded Dini Petty as host of the series.

In March 2006, the Saint-Jean-Baptiste Society of Montreal, a prominent sovereigntist group, demanded $100,000 from Copps, claiming that she had defamed them in a television interview on January 6, 2006. Sovereigntists claim that Options Canada illegally spent $3.5 million to promote federalism in Quebec, while Copps claimed that the St-Jean Baptiste Society spent $4.8 million from the Quebec Government to promote sovereignty, which the group denies. Copps claims that she had been unaware of the group's demands until she was approached for comment by reporters on March 5, 2006, and that she has yet to receive any legal notice from the group.

In 2006, subsequent to Paul Martin's resignation as prime minister, Copps decided not to seek the Liberal leadership.

Following the 2006 election, Liberal MP Paul Zed (Liberal, New Brunswick) and former MP Dennis Mills (Liberal, Ontario) organized a gala event to pay tribute to Copps and heal wounds caused by party infighting. Held on March 23, 2006, the event was attended by a host of prominent Liberals, including former Prime Minister John Turner and Aline Chrétien. The event also served as a fundraiser for Liberal women in Canadian politics.

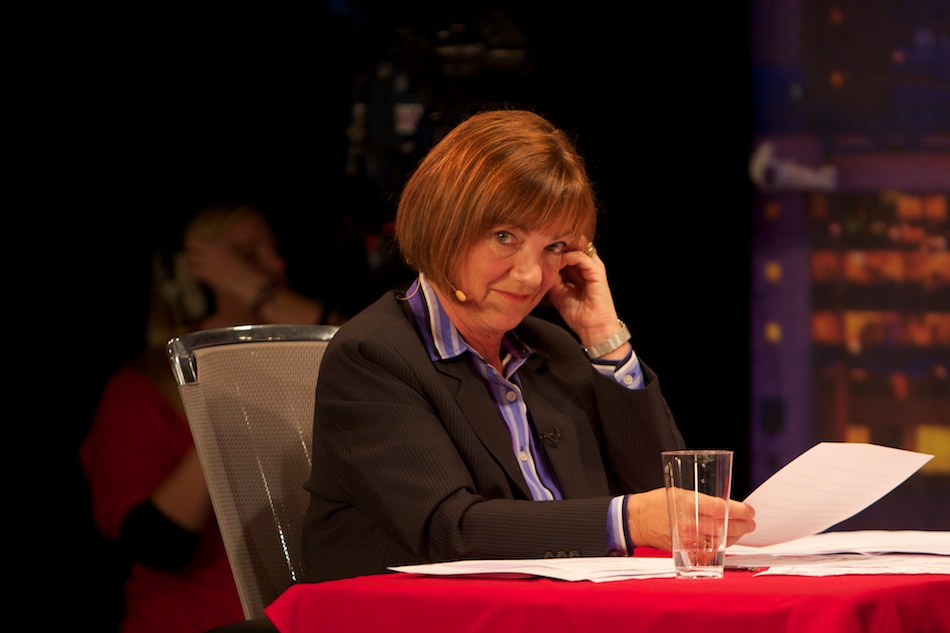
Copps at a municipal debate in 2010

As the daughter of late Hamilton Mayor Victor Copps, she has long been the object of speculation as to whether or not she would follow in the footsteps of her father, recently stating that, if she were to return to politics, she would do so "it would be in my hometown and nowhere else."

Copps ran to be president of the Liberal Party of Canada in 2012 but lost to Mike Crawley by 26 votes. Following the defeat, Copps announced her retirement from politics stating that while she would continue to volunteer in political campaigns she would not be running for office again. She was appointed an officer of the Order of Canada on December 30, 2012.

On November 10, 2014, Copps stated that she has been sexually assaulted and raped and one of the incidents happened while she was serving in the Provincial Parliament of Ontario. She said she felt compelled to come forward with the allegations after tweeting support for former Q host Jian Ghomeshi.

On September 9, 2022, Copps endorsed former Ontario New Democratic Party leader Andrea Horwath for mayor of Hamilton. In the 2025 Liberal Party of Canada leadership election, she endorsed Karina Gould.

=== Criticsm of SNC-Lavalin affair ===
At the height of the SNC-Lavalin affair during the Premiership of Justin Trudeau, Copps became known for being outspoken on the affair.

After Jody Wilson-Raybould and Jane Philpott resigned from their posts citing the government's handling of the matter, Copps repeatedly publicly called for their "firing" in the form of dismissal from the Liberal caucus. Copps argued Wilson-Raybould and Philpott's resignations amounted to a betrayal of Justin Trudeau's leadership and their presence continued to foment internal political divisions within the Liberal caucus. Copps directly pointed the blame on Wilson-Raybould and Philpott for "the public mud-dragging that you've taken the prime minister through."

Copps alleged that "while they had policy experience, they lacked political experience" and "when you don’t have a lot of political experience, the pressure gets too hot for you [and] I think that pressure has probably gotten to them, unfortunately." Sought out by CBC News for commentary, she wrote in an email that both "are doing their best to destroy their leader." Unprompted, Copps went as far as to say Wilson-Raybould and Philpott had "gone rogue" and were not "wizened political people." She claimed without providing evidence that Wilson-Raybould “doesn't really like to listen to other people, including the prime minister” and argued both she and Philpott were architects of their own victimization narrative being used for personal gain at the expense of the Prime Minister. Copps again disparaged Wilson-Raybould’s working relationship with her colleagues, alleging “[she] was running her own show, and nobody was going to tell her what to do anywhere.” Indigenous leaders argued the criticisms perpetuated colonial-era, sexist stereotypes that Indigenous women could not be powerful, forthright, and steadfast in positions of power, but rather confrontational, meddling and egotistic.

In a Twitter exchange with Jonathan Kay, Copps implied Wilson-Raybould’s conduct was one of a “bitch.” When concerns were raised that her diction made Indigenous issues sound menacing, Copps was "baffled," since to her "[the aboriginal agenda] only had positive connotations." Another tweet saw Copps imply Jody Wilson-Raybould, a member of the We Wai Kai Nation, would have cared more about intervening in SNC-Lavalin’s prosecution had the 9000 jobs reportedly at stake in Quebec instead been 9000 jobs held by Aboriginal people. Copps later denied her implication that Wilson-Raybould was working for Indigenous communities more than the general public. When queried about the racial undertones behind her messaging and reasoning, Copps responded: "Anybody who knows me knows I'm not a racist … there is a higher test for women, for minorities, for Indigenous people. For sure. Sadly, it's not fair." When asked if her comment about Wilson-Raybould perpetuated that double standard, Copps said no, that she was rather simply commenting on the former minister's background informing her choices.

Copps’s messages and conduct were condemned by a member of the Haudenosaunee First Nations Confederacy, NDP MP Romeo Saganash, Aboriginal rights activist Cindy Blackstock, and Conservative MP Gérard Deltell, among others.

== Writings and publications ==
- Nobody's Baby: A Survival Guide to Politics (1986). Toronto ON : Deneau. 192 p. ISBN 0-88879-135-6.
- Worth fighting for (2004). Toronto ON : McClelland & Stewart. 213 p. ISBN 0-7710-2282-4.
- La batailleuse (2004). Montreal QC : Boréal. 236 p. ISBN 2-7646-0341-X.

Chapter contribution

- Trish Hennessey and Ed Finn (editors). "Fight for equality is far from being won.", in: "Speaking Truth to Power : A Reader on Canadian Women's Inequality", Canadian Centre for Policy Alternatives, Ottawa, c.2010. pp. 15–18.

Articles

- "Canada's Historic Places Initiative", Heritage/Patrimoine, 6:26, Spring 2003.
- "Canadian Cultural Policy in a Global Economy", Canadian Business Economics, 7(3):40-3, Oct. 1999.
- "Celine Dion: Made in Canada", NPQ: New Perspectives Quarterly. 15(5):17, Fall 1998.
- "Initiative des Endroits Historiques du Canada", Heritage/Patrimoine. 6:26, Spring 2003.
- "Liberal Flogging of the Government's Green Plan", New Environment. pp. 39ff, Annual, 1990.
- "Two Grit Guys and a Cutie?", Bulletin Centre for Investigative Journalism. no. 42:9, Winter 1990.

== See also ==
- 2004 Liberal Party of Canada infighting
