= Maurice Couture =

Canadian Catholic bishop

The Most Reverend Maurice Couture R.S.V.
- Archbishop of Quebec
- Church: Roman Catholic
- Archdiocese: Québec
- Province: Québec
- See: Québec
- Appointed: March 17, 1990
- Term ended: November 15, 2002
- Predecessor: Louis-Albert Vachon
- Successor: Marc Ouellet
- Other post: Primate Emeritus of Canada
- Previous posts: Diocese of Baie-Comeau (1988–1990); Auxiliary Bishop of Québec (1982–1988); Titular Bishop of Talaptula (1982–1988)

Orders
- Ordination: June 17, 1951
- Consecration: October 22, 1982 by Louis-Albert Vachon

Personal details
- Born: November 3, 1926 Saint-Pierre-de-Broughton, Quebec
- Died: January 19, 2018 (aged 91) Quebec

Maurice Couture, GOQ (November 3, 1926 – January 19, 2018) was a Canadian Catholic bishop who served as Archbishop of Québec from 1990 until his retirement in 2002. Born in Saint-Pierre-de-Broughton, Quebec, he was ordained a priest in 1951. He was Bishop of Baie-Comeau from 1988 until 1990.

In 2003, he was made a Grand Officer of the National Order of Quebec.

Catholic Church titles
Preceded by Louis-Albert Vachon	Primate of Canada; 17 March 1990–15 November 2002	Succeeded by Marc Ouellet
Preceded by Louis-Albert Vachon	Archbishop of Quebec; 17 March 1990–15 November 2002	Succeeded by Marc Ouellet
