= Human Resources Development Canada =

Canadian government department from 1993 to 2003

Department overview
- Formed: 1993
- Preceding Department: Department of Employment and Immigration
- Dissolved: 2003
- Superseding agencies: Department of Social Development; Department of Human Resources and Skills Development
- Type: Department responsible for: Employment; Skills Training; Workplace Equality; Social Security
- Jurisdiction: Canada

Human Resources Development Canada (French: Développement des ressources humaines Canada, HRDC) was a department of the Government of Canada with responsibility over a large portfolio of social services. It focused on unemployment insurance, job training, counseling, and other services.

HRDC was based at a government office facility at Place du Portage IV in Gatineau (formerly downtown Hull, Quebec).

== History ==
HRDC was created in 1993 by Prime Minister Kim Campbell's government in an attempt to decrease the size of the federal cabinet by grouping several departments with similar responsibilities. In the case of HRDC, the former Department of Employment and Immigration formed its nucleus.

HRDC had one of the largest departmental budgets and a variety of responsibilities ranging from the unemployment insurance program to the issuance of social insurance numbers and job training and counseling.

Although HRDC was operationally functional since 1993, the Department of Human Resources Development Act was not adopted until 29 May 1996 and officially entered into force on 12 July 1996 when it received Royal Assent and was published in the Canada Gazette.

=== Department of Employment and Immigration ===
The Department of Employment and Immigration, in operation from 1977 to 1996, was the department that preceded HRDC and succeeded the Department of Manpower and Immigration.

The department was abolished on 12 July 1996. The role previously held by the Minister of Employment and Immigration in regard to labour was taken on by the Minister of Human Resources Development, while the portfolio for immigration was transferred to the office of Minister of Citizenship and Immigration following the reorganization of the government and formation of the department for Citizenship and Immigration Canada.

=== Dissolution (2003) ===
HRDC was dissolved in a December 2003 government reorganization which saw two departments, the Department of Social Development and the Department of Human Resources and Skills Development created in its place. The two departments were re-amalgamated on February 6, 2006, though now named Employment and Social Development Canada.

== Ministers ==
The Minister of Human Resources Development was the Minister of the Crown in the Canadian Cabinet responsible for overseeing HRDC. Prior to 1996, the post was known as Minister of Employment and Immigration. In 2003, the portfolio was divided to create the posts of Minister of Human Resources and Skills Development and Minister of Social Development.

Ministers of Human Resources Development
No.	Name	Term of office		Ministry
1.	Doug Young	July 12, 1996	October 3, 1996	under Prime Minister Jean Chrétien
2.	Pierre Pettigrew	October 4, 1996	August 2, 1999	under Prime Minister Jean Chrétien
3.	Jane Stewart	August 3, 1999	December 11, 2003	under Prime Minister Jean Chrétien

=== Minister of Employment and Immigration ===
Minister of Employment and Immigration
- Member of: Cabinet of Canada
- Constituting instrument: Statute 25-26 Elizabeth II, c. 54
- Formation: 15 August 1977
- First holder: Bud Cullen
- Final holder: Douglas Young
- Abolished: 12 July 1996

The Minister of Employment and Immigration was an office in the Cabinet of Canada, in operation from 1977 to 1996, and was first held by Bud Cullen, who continued from his preceding role as the Minister of Manpower and Immigration.

On 12 July 1996, the office of the Minister of Employment and Immigration was abolished and replaced with the office of Minister of Human Resources Development. The portfolio for immigration was transferred to the office of Minister of Citizenship and Immigration following the reorganization of the government and formation of the department for Citizenship and Immigration Canada.

Ministers of Employment and Immigration
No.	Name	Term of office		Political party	Ministry
1	Bud Cullen	August 15, 1977	June 3, 1979	Liberal	20 (P. E. Trudeau)
2	Ron Atkey	June 4, 1979	March 2, 1980	Progressive Conservative	21 (Clark)
3	Lloyd Axworthy	March 3, 1980	August 11, 1983	Liberal	22 (P. E. Trudeau)
4	John Roberts	August 12, 1983	June 29, 1984	Liberal	22 (P. E. Trudeau)
4	John Roberts	June 30, 1984	September 16, 1984	Liberal	23 (Turner)
5	Flora MacDonald	September 17, 1984	June 29, 1986	Progressive Conservative	24 (Mulroney)
6	Benoît Bouchard	June 30, 1986	March 30, 1988	Progressive Conservative	24 (Mulroney)
7	Barbara McDougall	March 31, 1988	April 20, 1991	Progressive Conservative	24 (Mulroney)
8	Bernard Valcourt	April 21, 1991	June 24, 1993	Progressive Conservative	24 (Mulroney)
8	Bernard Valcourt	June 25, 1993	November 3, 1993	Progressive Conservative	25 (Campbell)
–	Lloyd Axworthy (second time)	November 4, 1993	January 24, 1996	Liberal	26 (Chrétien)
9	Douglas Young	January 25, 1996	July 11, 1996	Liberal	26 (Chrétien)
Key: Liberal Party of Canada Progressive Conservative

== Controversies ==
In the late 1990s, HRDC gained public headlines across Canada following numerous poorly thought procurements, notably dozens of server computers using the Unix operating system, this despite the fact that the purchase far exceeded the department's computing requirements. Other problems relating to several incompatible email systems made HRDC a scapegoat for attacks on the government by opposition parties.

In 2000, HRDC's poor accounting practices were made infamous by the Canadian Alliance when it was claimed that approximately $1 billion (CAD) in employment grants could not be accounted for. Peter Donolo later claimed that this scandal was "phony" and the true amount unaccounted for was $85,000.

== See also ==
- Minister of Human Resources Development
