= Minister of Canadian Identity and Culture =

Canadian federal cabinet position

- Ministre de l'Identité et de la Culture canadiennes
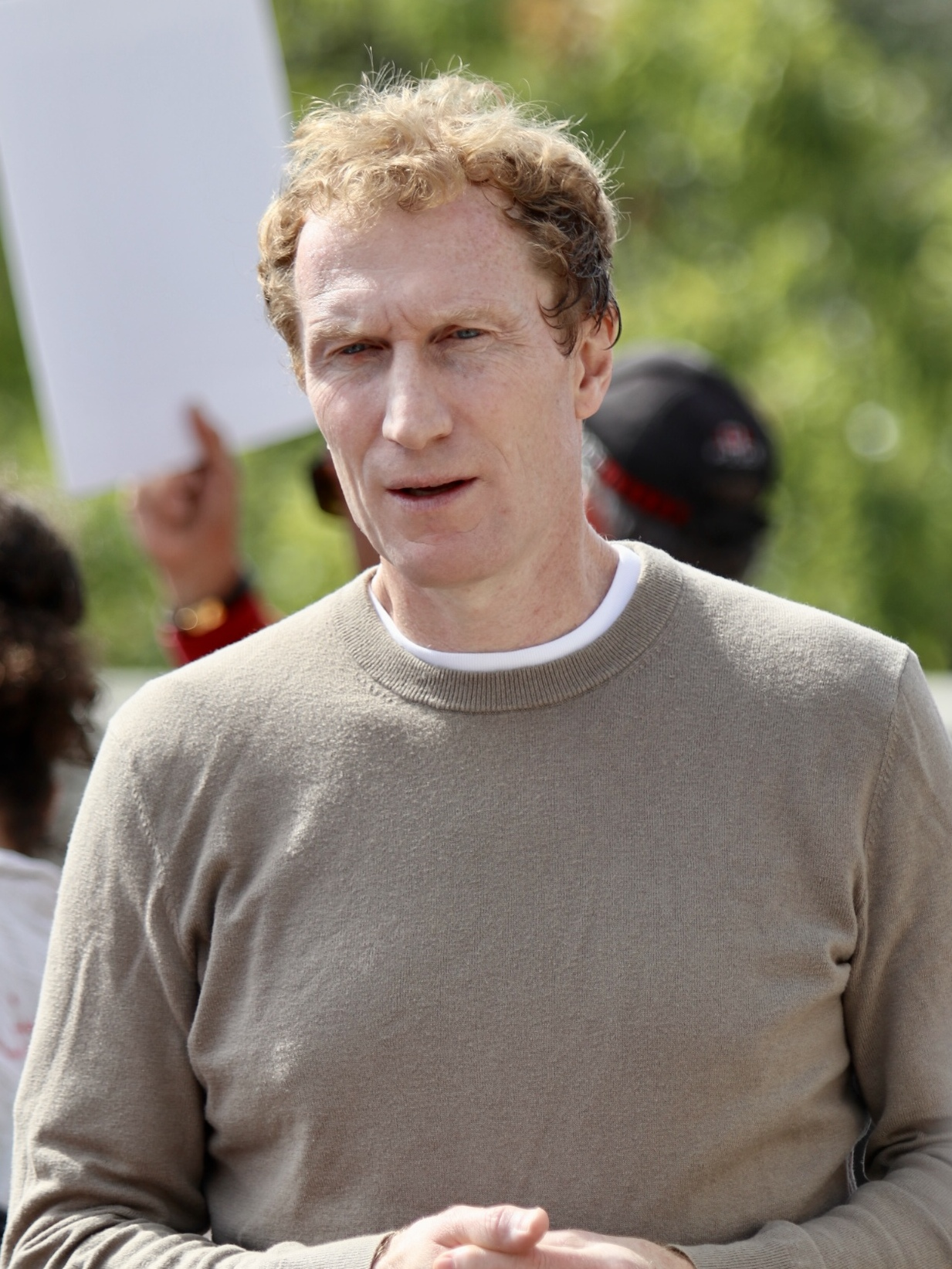
- Incumbent; Marc Miller since December 1, 2025
- Department of Canadian Heritage
- Style: The Honourable
- Member of: House of Commons; Privy Council; Cabinet
- Reports to: Parliament; Prime Minister
- Appointer: Monarch (represented by the governor general); on the advice of the prime minister
- Term length: At His Majesty's pleasure
- Inaugural holder: Sheila Copps
- Formation: 12 July 1996
- Salary: CA$299,900 (2024)
- Website: www.canada.ca/en/canadian-heritage.html

The minister of Canadian identity and culture (French: ministre de l'identité et de la culture canadiennes) is the minister of the Crown responsible for the Department of Canadian Heritage. The minister is a member of the King's Privy Council for Canada and the Canadian Cabinet.

Marc Miller has served as the current minister of Canadian identity and culture since 2025. The minister is selected by the prime minister and appointed by the Crown. The role was created in 1996 as the minister of Canadian heritage (French: ministre du patrimoine canadien) to lead the government's culture, media, sports, and arts initiatives. In March 2025, the role was renamed as the minister of Canadian culture and identity, Parks Canada and Quebec lieutenant, and the portfolio assumed responsibility for Parks Canada. The simplified title was adopted in May 2025.

== History ==
The position was created in 1996 as the Minister of Canadian Heritage to combine the posts of minister of multiculturalism and citizenship and minister of communications. The "status of women" was merged from the minister responsible for the status of women in 2006. In 2008, the status of women portfolio was transferred to a minister of state.

On August 16, 2013, the multiculturalism portfolio was assigned to Jason Kenney, who was appointed minister for multiculturalism in addition to his other portfolios.

Those portfolios and responsibilities such as for the Canadian Race Relations Foundation, were returned to the heritage minister with the swearing in of the 29th Canadian Ministry in November 2015. The heritage minister also gained responsibility for the National Capital Commission, which was formerly under the senior Ottawa-area cabinet minister under the Harper government; and the Canadian secretary to the Queen, which was previously under the Privy Council Office.

The position was modified slightly on March 14, 2025, at the start of the 30th Canadian Ministry, gaining responsibility for Parks Canada from the Minister of Environment and Climate Change and being officially renamed the Minister of Canadian Culture and Identity, Parks Canada and Quebec Lieutenant (French: Ministre de la Culture et de l'Identité canadiennes, Parcs Canada et lieutenant du Québec); while the role of Quebec lieutenant had previously been held by Pablo Rodriguez during his stint as Minister of Canadian Heritage, this was the first time the role of Quebec lieutenant was formally included in the minister's title.

In May 2025, the position was renamed to Minister of Canadian Identity and Culture.

Traditionally, the minister attends the Juno Awards to present the awards for Breakthrough Artist and Breakthrough Group Of The Year.

== List of ministers ==
Key:

Liberal Party of Canada
Conservative Party of Canada

No.	Portrait	Name	Term of office		Political party	Ministry
Minister of Canadian Heritage
1		Sheila Copps	July 12, 1996	December 11, 2003	Liberal	26 (Chrétien)
2		Hélène Scherrer	December 12, 2003	July 19, 2004	Liberal	27 (Martin)
3		Liza Frulla	July 20, 2004	February 5, 2006	Liberal	27 (Martin)
Minister of Canadian Heritage and Status of Women
4		Bev Oda	February 6, 2006	August 14, 2007	Conservative	28 (Harper)
5		Josée Verner	August 14, 2007	October 29, 2008	Conservative	28 (Harper)
Minister of Canadian Heritage and Official Languages
6		James Moore	October 30, 2008	July 15, 2013	Conservative	28 (Harper)
7		Shelly Glover	July 15, 2013	November 4, 2015	Conservative	28 (Harper)
Minister of Canadian Heritage
8		Mélanie Joly	November 4, 2015	July 18, 2018	Liberal	29 (J. Trudeau)
Minister of Canadian Heritage and Multiculturalism
9		Pablo Rodriguez	July 18, 2018	November 20, 2019	Liberal	29 (J. Trudeau)
Minister of Canadian Heritage
10		Steven Guilbeault	November 20, 2019	October 26, 2021	Liberal	29 (J. Trudeau)
(9)		Pablo Rodriguez	October 26, 2021	July 26, 2023	Liberal	29 (J. Trudeau)
11		Pascale St-Onge	July 26, 2023	March 14, 2025	Liberal	29 (J. Trudeau)
Minister of Canadian Culture and Identity, Parks Canada and Quebec Lieutenant
(10)		Steven Guilbeault	March 14, 2025	May 13, 2025	Liberal	30 (Carney)
Minister of Canadian Identity and Culture
(10)		Steven Guilbeault	May 13, 2025	November 27, 2025	Liberal	30 (Carney)
12		Marc Miller	December 1, 2025	Incumbent	Liberal	30 (Carney)

== Responsibilities ==
Prior to 2003, their responsibilities included National Parks and historic sites. The minister is responsible for:

- Department of Canadian Heritage
- Canada Council for the Arts
- Canadian Broadcasting Corporation
- Canadian Race Relations Foundation
- Canadian Radio-television and Telecommunications Commission
- Canadian Secretary to the King
- Library and Archives Canada
- National Arts Centre
- National Battlefields Commission
- National Capital Commission
- National Film Board of Canada
- Canadian Museum of History
- Canadian War Museum
- Virtual Museum of New France
- Canadian Museum for Human Rights
- Canadian Museum of Immigration at Pier 21
- Canadian Museum of Nature
- Ingenium (Canada Science and Technology Museum, Canada Agriculture and Food Museum, Canada Aviation and Space Museum)
- National Gallery of Canada
- Portrait Gallery of Canada
- Public Service Commission of Canada
- Public Service Staff Relations Board
- Telefilm Canada

== General duties ==
The minister's general powers, duties, and functions are set out by section 4 of the Department of Canadian Heritage Act, which provides as follows:

(1) The powers, duties and functions of the Minister extend to and include all matters over which Parliament has jurisdiction, not by law assigned to any other department, board or agency of the Government of Canada, relating to Canadian identity and values, cultural development and heritage.

(2) The Minister's jurisdiction referred to in subsection (1) encompasses, but is not limited to, jurisdiction over

- the promotion of a greater understanding of human rights, fundamental freedoms and related values;
- multiculturalism;
- the arts, including cultural aspects of the status of the artist;
- cultural heritage and industries, including performing arts, visual and audio-visual arts, publishing, sound recording, film, video and literature;
- national battlefields;
- the encouragement, promotion and development of sport;
- the advancement of the equality of status and use of English and French and the enhancement and development of the English and French linguistic minority communities in Canada;
- state ceremonial and Canadian symbols;
- broadcasting, except in respect of spectrum management and the technical aspects of broadcasting;
- the formulation of cultural policy, including the formulation of cultural policy as it relates to foreign investment and copyright;
- the conservation, exportation and importation of cultural property; and
- national museums, archives and libraries.

In addition, sections 42 to 44 of the Official Languages Act confer certain other responsibilities on the minister of Canadian heritage (see minister responsible for Official Languages (Canada)).
