= Minister of Government Transformation, Public Services and Procurement =

Minister in the Cabinet of Canada

- Ministre de la Transformation du gouvernement, des Services publics et de l’Approvisionnement
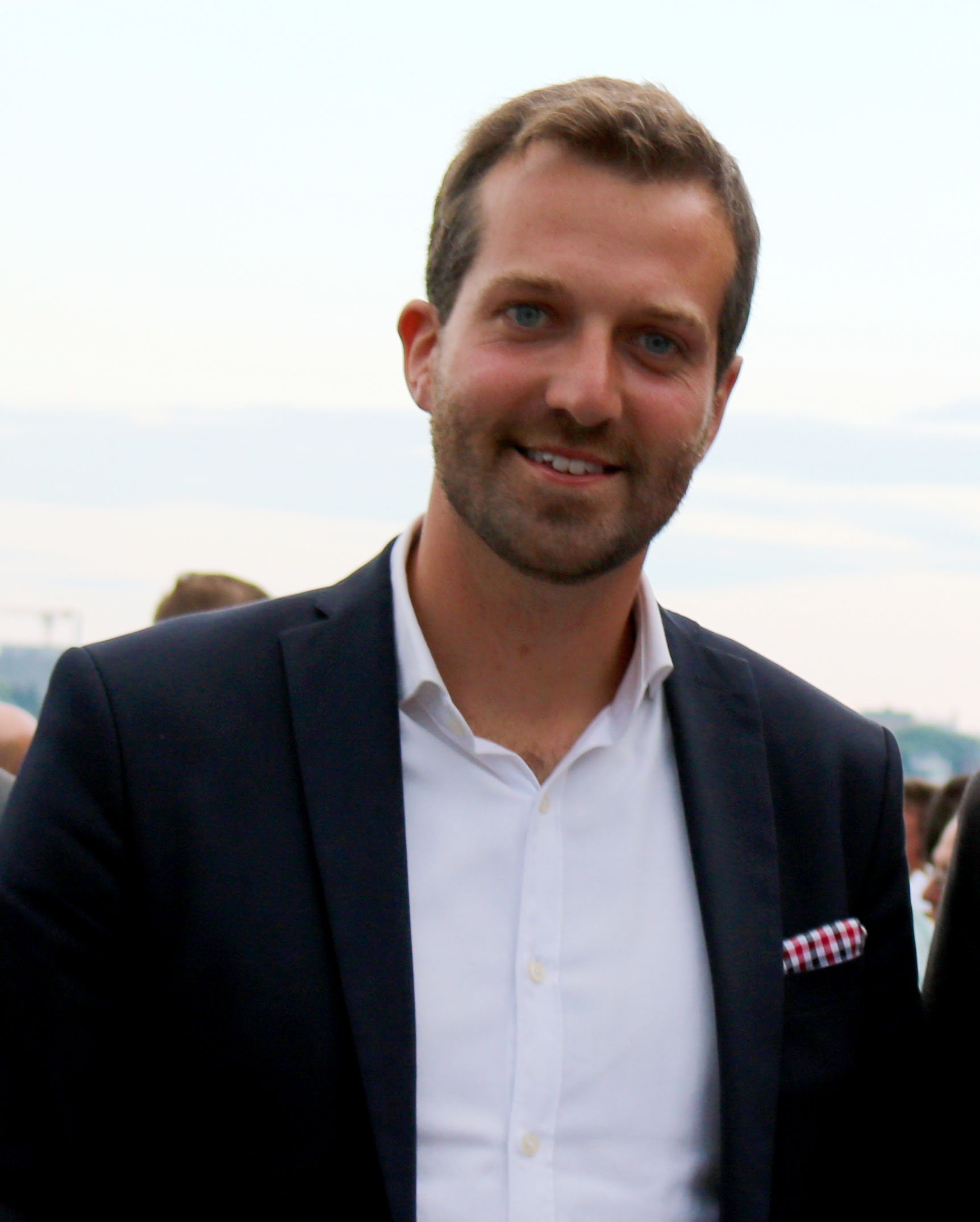
- Incumbent; Joël Lightbound since March 14, 2025
- Public Services and Procurement Canada
- Style: The Honourable
- Member of: Parliament; Privy Council; Cabinet
- Reports to: Parliament; Prime Minister
- Appointer: Monarch (represented by the governor general); on the advice of the prime minister
- Term length: At His Majesty's pleasure
- Inaugural holder: Diane Marleau
- Formation: 12 July 1996
- Salary: CA$299,900 (2024)
- Website: www.tpsgc-pwgsc.gc.ca

The minister of government transformation, public services and procurement (French: ministre de la transformation du gouvernement, des services publics et de l’approvisionnement) is the minister of the Crown responsible for Public Services and Procurement Canada (PSPC) and several other agencies. The minister concurrently serves as Receiver General for Canada, and is a member of the King's Privy Council for Canada and the Canadian Cabinet.

Joël Lightbound has been Minister of Government Transformation, Public Services and Procurement since May 13, 2025. The minister is selected by the prime minister and appointed by the Crown. The role was created in 1996 as the minister of public works and government services, to oversee the Department of Public Works and Government Services, an expansive common services department of the Government of Canada. In 2015, the title was change to be the minister of public services and procurement. The present title was adopted in 2025.

== Organization and role ==
The minister is the receiver general for Canada. The Department of Public Works and Government Services Act, 1996 states: "In the Minister's capacity as Receiver General, the Minister shall exercise all the powers and perform all the duties and functions assigned to the receiver general by law."

In addition to PSPC, the minister is responsible for:

- Shared Services Canada
- Canada Lands Company
- Canada Post Corporation
- Defence Construction Canada
- National Capital Commission
- Payment In Lieu of Taxes Dispute Advisory Panel

== List of ministers ==
Key:

Liberal Party of Canada
Conservative Party of Canada

No.	Portrait	Name	Term of office		Political party	Ministry
Minister of Public Works and Government Services
1		Diane Marleau	July 12, 1996	June 10, 1997	Liberal	26 (Chrétien)
2		Alfonso Gagliano	June 11, 1997	January 14, 2002	Liberal	26 (Chrétien)
3		Don Boudria	January 15, 2002	May 25, 2002	Liberal	26 (Chrétien)
4		Ralph Goodale	May 26, 2002	December 11, 2003	Liberal	26 (Chrétien)
5		Stephen Owen	December 12, 2003	July 19, 2004	Liberal	27 (Martin)
6		Scott Brison	July 20, 2004	February 5, 2006	Liberal	27 (Martin)
7		Michael Fortier	February 6, 2006	June 24, 2008	Conservative	28 (Harper)
8		Christian Paradis	June 25, 2008	January 19, 2010	Conservative	28 (Harper)
9		Rona Ambrose	January 20, 2010	July 14, 2013	Conservative	28 (Harper)
10		Diane Finley	July 15, 2013	November 4, 2015	Conservative	28 (Harper)
Minister of Public Services and Procurement
11		Judy Foote	November 5, 2015	August 27, 2017	Liberal	29 (J. Trudeau)
12		Carla Qualtrough	August 28, 2017	July 18, 2018	Liberal	29 (J. Trudeau)
Minister of Public Services and Procurement and Accessibility
(12)		Carla Qualtrough	July 18, 2018	November 20, 2019	Liberal	29 (J. Trudeau)
Minister of Public Services and Procurement
13		Anita Anand	November 20, 2019	October 26, 2021	Liberal	29 (J. Trudeau)
14		Filomena Tassi	October 26, 2021	August 31, 2022	Liberal	29 (J. Trudeau)
15		Helena Jaczek	August 31, 2022	July 26, 2023	Liberal	29 (J. Trudeau)
16		Jean-Yves Duclos	July 26, 2023	March 14, 2025	Liberal	29 (J. Trudeau)
Minister of Government Transformation, Public Services and Procurement
17		Ali Ehsassi	March 14, 2025	May 13, 2025	Liberal	30 (Carney)
18		Joël Lightbound	May 13, 2025	Incumbent	Liberal	30 (Carney)

Prior to 1996, the responsibilities of the current Public Works and Government Services portfolio were divided between the now-defunct posts of Minister of Public Works and Minister of Supply and Services.

=== Secretary of State (Defence Procurement) ===
No.	Portrait	Name	Term of office		Political party	Ministry
Secretary of State (Defence Procurement)
1		Stephen Fuhr	May 13, 2025	present	Liberal	30 (Carney)

== Acts for which the minister is responsible ==
1. Anti-Personnel Mines Convention Implementation Act
2. Bridges Act
3. Canadian Arsenals Limited Divestiture Authorization Act
4. Defence Production Act
5. Department of Public Works and Government Services Act
6. Dry Dock Subsidies Act
7. Expropriation Act
8. Federal District Commission to have acquired certain lands, An Act to confirm the authority of the
9. Garnishment, Attachment and Pension Diversion Act
10. Government Property Traffic Act
11. Kingsmere Park Act
12. National Flag of Canada Manufacturing Standards Act
13. Ottawa River, An Act respecting certain works
14. Payments in Lieu of Taxes Act
15. Pension Benefits Division Act
16. Publication of Statutes Act
17. Seized Property Management Act
18. Shared Services Canada Act
19. Surplus Crown Assets Act
20. Translation Bureau Act
