= Minister of the Environment, Climate Change and Nature =

Canadian cabinet position

- Ministre de l'Environnement, du Changement climatique et de la Nature
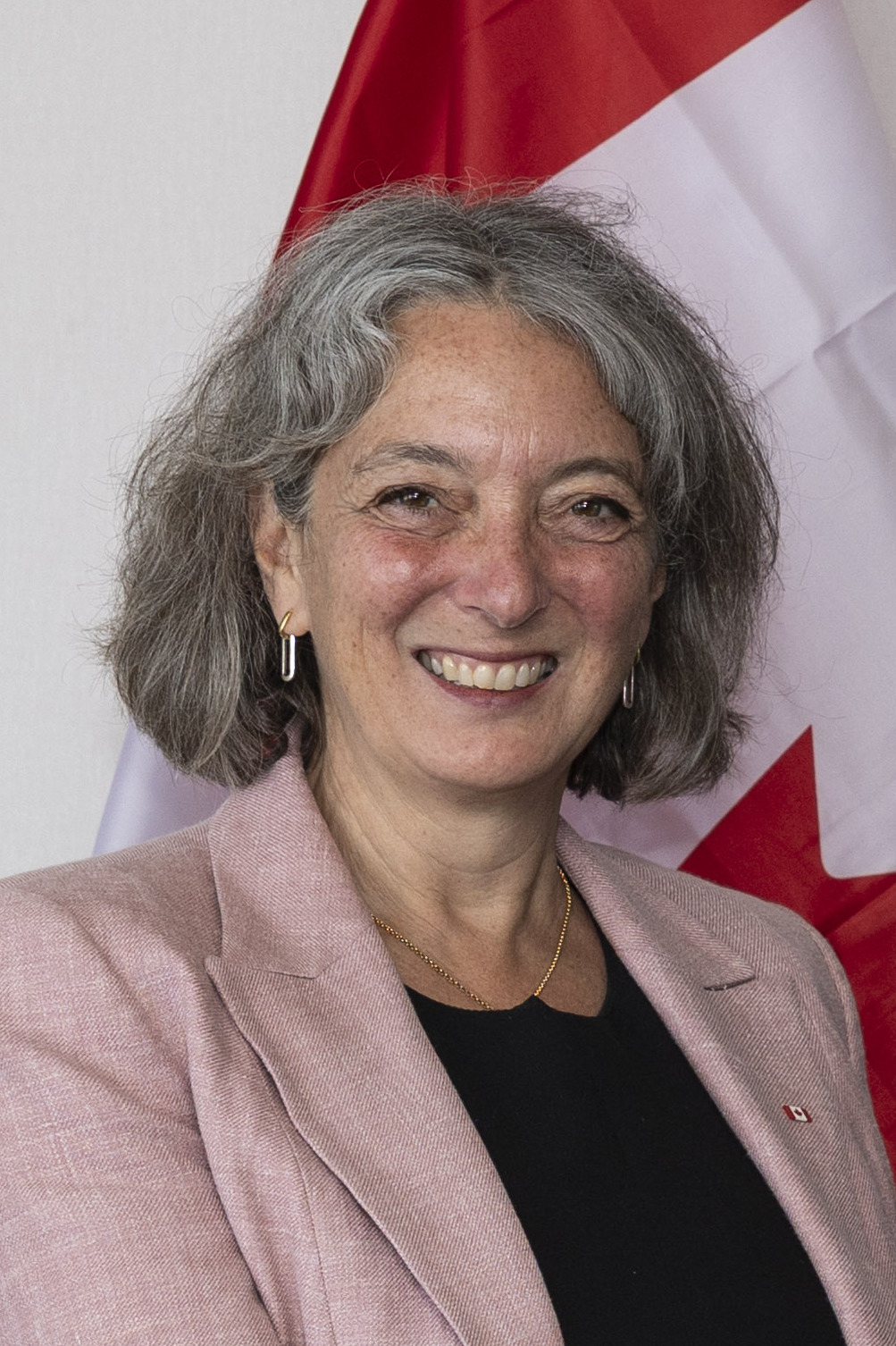
- Incumbent; Julie Dabrusin since May 13, 2025
- Environment and Climate Change Canada
- Style: The Honourable
- Member of: House of Commons; Privy Council; Cabinet
- Reports to: Parliament; Prime Minister
- Appointer: Monarch (represented by the governor general); on the advice of the prime minister
- Term length: At His Majesty's pleasure
- Inaugural holder: Jack Davis
- Formation: 11 June 1971
- Salary: CA$299,900 (2024)
- Website: www.ec.gc.ca

The minister of the environment, climate change and nature (French: ministre de l'environnement, du changement climatique et de la nature) is the minister of the Crown responsible for Environment and Climate Change Canada, Parks Canada and the Impact Assessment Agency of Canada. The minister is a member of the King's Privy Council for Canada and the Canadian Cabinet.

Julie Dabrusin has been the minister since May 13, 2025. The minister is selected by the prime minister and appointed by the Crown. The role was introduced in 1971 as the minister of environment. Until 1979, the role was also responsible for fisheries. Environment Canada was rebranded to include climate change in its name in 2015, and the minister's title was renamed Minister of Environment and Climate Change. After re-absorbing responsibility for Parks Canada in 2025, the current title was adopted.

== List of ministers ==
Key:

Liberal Party of Canada
Historical conservative parties: Liberal-Conservative, Conservative (historical), Unionist, National Liberal and Conservative, Progressive Conservative
Conservative Party of Canada

No.	Portrait	Name	Term of office		Political party	Ministry	Refs.
Minister of Environment Minister of Fisheries
1		Jack Davis	June 11, 1971	August 7, 1974	Liberal	20 (P. E. Trudeau)	
2		Jeanne Sauvé	August 8, 1974	December 4, 1975	Liberal	20 (P. E. Trudeau)	
–		Roméo LeBlanc (Acting)	December 5, 1975	January 21, 1976	Liberal	20 (P. E. Trudeau)	
3		Jean Marchand	January 22, 1976	June 30, 1976	Liberal	20 (P. E. Trudeau)	
–		Roméo LeBlanc (Acting)	July 1, 1976	September 13, 1976	Liberal	20 (P. E. Trudeau)	
Minister of Fisheries and the Environment
4		Roméo LeBlanc	September 14, 1976	April 1, 1979	Liberal	20 (P. E. Trudeau)	
Minister of the Environment
5		Leonard Marchand	April 2, 1979	June 3, 1979	Liberal	20 (P. E. Trudeau)	
6		John Allen Fraser	June 4, 1979	March 2, 1980	Progressive Conservative	21 (Clark)	
7		John Roberts	March 3, 1980	August 11, 1983	Liberal	22 (P. E. Trudeau)	
8		Charles Caccia	August 12, 1983	June 29, 1984	Liberal	22 (P. E. Trudeau)	
8		Charles Caccia	June 30, 1984	September 16, 1984	Liberal	23 (Turner)	
9		Suzanne Blais-Grenier	September 17, 1984	August 19, 1985	Progressive Conservative	24 (Mulroney)	
10		Thomas McMillan	August 20, 1985	December 7, 1988	Progressive Conservative	24 (Mulroney)	
11		Lucien Bouchard	December 8, 1988 (Acting until Jan.30, 1989)	May 21, 1990	Progressive Conservative	24 (Mulroney)	
–		Frank Oberle (Acting)	May 22, 1990	May 22, 1990	Progressive Conservative	24 (Mulroney)	
12		Robert de Cotret	May 23, 1990 (Acting until Sep.20)	April 20, 1991	Progressive Conservative	24 (Mulroney)	
13		Jean Charest	April 21, 1991	June 24, 1993	Progressive Conservative	24 (Mulroney)	
14		Pierre H. Vincent	June 25, 1993	November 3, 1993	Progressive Conservative	25 (Campbell)	
15		Sheila Copps	November 4, 1993	January 24, 1996	Liberal	26 (Chrétien)	
16		Sergio Marchi	January 25, 1996	June 10, 1997	Liberal	26 (Chrétien)	
17		Christine Stewart	June 11, 1997	August 2, 1999	Liberal	26 (Chrétien)	
18		David Anderson	August 3, 1999	December 11, 2003	Liberal	26 (Chrétien)	
18		David Anderson	December 12, 2003	July 19, 2004	Liberal	27 (Martin)	
19		Stéphane Dion	July 20, 2004	February 5, 2006	Liberal	27 (Martin)	
20		Rona Ambrose	February 6, 2006	January 3, 2007	Conservative	28 (Harper)	
21		John Baird	January 4, 2007	October 29, 2008	Conservative	28 (Harper)	
22		Jim Prentice	October 30, 2008	November 5, 2010	Conservative	28 (Harper)	
23		John Baird	November 7, 2010	January 3, 2011	Conservative	28 (Harper)	
24		Peter Kent	January 4, 2011	July 15, 2013	Conservative	28 (Harper)	
25		Leona Aglukkaq	July 15, 2013	November 4, 2015	Conservative	28 (Harper)	
Minister of Environment and Climate Change
26		Catherine McKenna	November 4, 2015	November 20, 2019	Liberal	29 (J. Trudeau)	
27		Jonathan Wilkinson	November 20, 2019	October 26, 2021	Liberal	29 (J. Trudeau)	
28		Steven Guilbeault	October 26, 2021	March 14, 2025	Liberal	29 (J. Trudeau)	
29		Terry Duguid	March 14, 2025	May 12, 2025	Liberal	30 (Carney)	
30		Julie Dabrusin	May 13, 2025	December 1, 2025	Liberal	30 (Carney)	
Minister of Environment, Climate Change and Nature
(30)		Julie Dabrusin	December 1, 2025	Incumbent	Liberal	30 (Carney)	

=== Secretary of State (Nature) ===
No.	Portrait	Name	Term of office		Political party	Ministry
Secretary of State (Nature)
1		Nathalie Provost	May 13, 2025	present	Liberal	30 (Carney)
