= Raymond Grant, 11th Baron de Longueuil =

Raymond Grant
- Baron de Longueuil
- Shield of the coat of arms
- Born: Raymond David Grant de Longueuil; 3 September 1921; Sus, France
- Died: 5 October 2004 (aged 79–80); Navarrenx, France
- Spouse: Anne Maltby
- Issue: Michael
- Parents: Ronald Grant, 10th Baron de Longueuil and Ernestine Hester Maud Bowes-Lyon
- Occupation: Lieutenant, blood transfusion services, painter

Raymond David Grant, 11th Baron de Longueuil (3 September 1921 – 5 October 2004) was a British nobleman possessing the only French colonial title to be officially recognised by the British Crown. For much of his life, he was a professional painter residing in France.

== Family ==
He was the son of Ronald Charles Grant, 10th Baron de Longueuil and Ernestine Bowes-Lyon. His mother was a first cousin to the Queen Mother. The 11th Baron was therefore a second cousin to Queen Elizabeth II.

Raymond had one son, Michael Charles Grant (who inherited his title), and four grandchildren: Angela, Rachel, Rebecca and David.

== School and military ==
He attended schools in Pau, and then Elizabeth College in Guernsey. With the outbreak of World War II, he came to Britain where he volunteered and became a Lieutenant in 1943. After the war, he returned to school, this time in Nottingham, England. He later went to Cambridge, England to study art, at first full-time and later in the evenings between his employment in the Cambridge-area blood transfusion services.

== Life's work ==
In 1953, he returned to Navarrenx in the South of France near the Pyrenees. He began his professional career as an artist, constantly entering competitions, exhibiting, and later permanent exhibitions in the town. He developed and matured distinctive styles, seeking the company of regional artists and accepting criticism. He spent most of his life as an artist, painting under the name of "Raymond de Longueuil", capturing the final years of traditional farming in the Bearn. His subjects ranged from the figurative, through still life and landscape to the abstract, and he had a constant need to develop and experiment. A deeply religious man, he was almost reclusive and fanatical about his creativity - characteristics which flowed into his art, diaries, and poetry.

This was not a life of privilege but of challenge. From both outside and inside, he was obsessed by creativity. Elements from his deep faith were frequently reflected in subtle motifs. Prior to his death in 2004, he had been working until two days before on a woodland scene, sketched out on his easel in his bedroom. Next to this was his light-box and an outline for a monoprint of The Shepherd leading his flock through mountains.

== Legacy ==
He died in Navarrenx, France in 2004.

The Institute Raymond de Longueuil opened in Navarrenx in 2007. It houses a selection of his works and is intended to serve as a local place of interest for travellers and artists.

June 2008 marked the official inauguration of "Passage Raymond de Longueuil l" - the naming of an old, historic street at the king's lieutenant's grounds in the centre of Navarrenx, in remembrance of the acclaimed local artist. Included in the unveiling was an exhibition opening of unique works by Raymond de Longueuil held at the former residence of the king's lieutenant.

== Ancestry ==
Ancestors of Raymond Grant, 11th Baron de Longueuil

16. Charles William Grant, 5th Baron de Longueuil
8. Charles James Irwin Grant, 6th Baron de Longueuil
17. Caroline Coffin
4. John Charles Moore Grant, 9th Baron de Longueuil
18. Louis Trapman
9. Anne Marie Catherine Trapman
19. Mary Bowen Moore
2. Ronald Charles Grant, 10th Baron de Longueuil
20. William Leonard Barron
10. Joseph Barron
21. Mary Catherine Murphy
5. Maria-Carlotta Barron
22. William Robert Walkinshaw
11. Roberta Walkinshaw
23. Francisca Garriz
1. Raymond Grant, 11th Baron de Longueuil
24. Thomas Lyon-Bowes, Lord Glamis
12. Claude Bowes-Lyon, 13th Earl of Strathmore and Kinghorne
25. Charlotte Grimstead
6. Hon. Ernest Bowes-Lyon
26. Oswald Smith
13. Frances Dora Smith
27. Henrietta Hodgson
3. Ernestine Hester Maud Bowes-Lyon
28. John Drummond
14. Harvey Drummond
29. Georgina Augusta Harvey
7. Isobel Hester Drummond
30. Andrew Mortimer Drummond
15. Susan Caroline Drummond
31. Lady Emily Charlotte Percy

French nobility recognized by the Crown in right of Canada
Preceded by Ronald Charles Grant	Baron de Longueuil; 1959–2004	Succeeded by Michael Grant
