= List of 2006 Canadian incumbents =

== Crown ==
- Head of State - Queen Elizabeth II

== Federal government ==
- Governor General - Michaëlle Jean

=== Cabinet ===
- Prime Minister - Paul Martin then Stephen Harper
- Deputy Prime Minister - Anne McLellan to none
- Minister of Finance - Ralph Goodale to Jim Flaherty
- Minister of Foreign Affairs - Pierre Pettigrew then Peter MacKay
- Minister of National Defence - Bill Graham to Gordon O'Connor
- Minister of Health - Ujjal Dosanjh to Tony Clement
- Minister of Industry - David Emerson to Maxime Bernier
- Minister of Heritage - Liza Frulla to Bev Oda
- Minister of Intergovernmental Affairs - Lucienne Robillard then Michael Chong
- Minister of the Environment - Stéphane Dion to Rona Ambrose
- Minister of Justice - Irwin Cotler to Vic Toews
- Minister of Transport - Jean Lapierre to Lawrence Cannon
- Minister of Citizenship and Immigration - Joe Volpe to Monte Solberg
- Minister of Fisheries and Oceans - Geoff Regan to Loyola Hearn
- Minister of Agriculture and Agri-Food - Andy Mitchell to Chuck Strahl
- Minister of Public Works and Government Services - Scott Brison to Michael Fortier
- Minister of Natural Resources - John Efford to Gary Lunn
- Minister of Human Resources and Skills Development - Belinda Stronach to Diane Finley

== Members of Parliament ==
See: 38th Canadian parliament, 39th Canadian parliament

=== Party leaders ===
- Liberal Party of Canada - Paul Martin to Bill Graham (interim) to Stéphane Dion
- Conservative Party of Canada - Stephen Harper
- Bloc Québécois - Gilles Duceppe
- New Democratic Party - Jack Layton
- Green Party of Canada - Jim Harris to Elizabeth May

=== Supreme Court justices ===
- Chief Justice: Beverley McLachlin
- Marshall Rothstein
- Michel Bastarache
- William Ian Corneil Binnie
- Louis LeBel
- Marie Deschamps
- Morris Fish
- Louise Charron
- Rosalie Abella

=== Other ===
- Speaker of the House of Commons - Peter Milliken
- Governor of the Bank of Canada - David Dodge
- Chief of the Defence Staff - General Rick Hillier

== Provinces & Territories ==
=== Lieutenant-governors ===
- Lieutenant-Governor of Alberta - Normie Kwong
- Lieutenant-Governor of British Columbia - Iona Campagnolo
- Lieutenant-Governor of Manitoba - John Harvard
- Lieutenant-Governor of New Brunswick - Herménégilde Chiasson
- Lieutenant-Governor of Newfoundland and Labrador - Edward Roberts
- Lieutenant-Governor of Nova Scotia - Myra Freeman
- Lieutenant-Governor of Ontario - James Bartleman
- Lieutenant-Governor of Prince Edward Island - Léonce Bernard
- Lieutenant-Governor of Quebec - Lise Thibault
- Lieutenant-Governor of Saskatchewan - Lynda Haverstock

=== Premiers ===
- Premier of Alberta - Ed Stelmach
- Premier of British Columbia - Gordon Campbell
- Premier of Manitoba - Gary Doer
- Premier of New Brunswick - Bernard Lord to Shawn Graham
- Premier of Newfoundland and Labrador - Danny Williams
- Premier of Nova Scotia - John Hamm to Rodney MacDonald
- Premier of Ontario - Dalton McGuinty
- Premier of Prince Edward Island - Pat Binns
- Premier of Quebec - Jean Charest
- Premier of Saskatchewan - Lorne Calvert
- Premier of the Northwest Territories - Joe Handley
- Premier of Nunavut - Paul Okalik
- Premier of Yukon - Dennis Fentie

== Mayors ==
see also list of mayors in Canada

- Toronto - David Miller
- Montreal - Gérald Tremblay
- Vancouver - Larry Campbell
- Ottawa - Bob Chiarelli
- Winnipeg - Sam Katz
- Edmonton - Stephen Mandel
- Calgary - Dave Bronconnier
- Victoria - Alan Lowe

== Religious leaders ==
- Roman Catholic Archbishop of Quebec and Primate of Canada - Cardinal Archbishop Marc Ouellet
- Roman Catholic Archbishop of Montreal - Cardinal Archbishop Jean-Claude Turcotte
- Roman Catholic Bishops of London - Bishop Ronald Peter Fabbro
- Roman Catholic Archbishop of Toronto - Cardinal Archbishop Aloysius Ambrozic then Archbishop Thomas Christopher Collins
- Primate of the Anglican Church of Canada - Andrew Hutchison
- Moderator of the United Church of Canada - Peter Short then David Giuliano
- Moderator of the Presbyterian Church in Canada - Richard Fee then Wilma Welsh
- National Bishop of the Evangelical Lutheran Church in Canada - Raymond Schultz

== Peer ==
- Michael Grant, 12th Baron de Longueuil

== See also ==
- 2005 Canadian incumbents
- Events in Canada in 2006
- 2007 Canadian incumbents
- incumbents around the world in 2006
- Canadian incumbents by year
