= Charles Grant =

Charles or Charlie Grant may refer to:

== Arts and entertainment ==
- C.J. Grant (Charles Jameson Grant, fl. 1830–1852), American editorial cartoonist
- Charles L. Grant (1942–2006), American novelist
- Charles Grant (actor) (born 1957), American actor
- Charles Grant, featured dancer at the Eleo Pomare Dance Company
- Charles Grant (game designer) (died 1979), Scottish game author

== Military ==
- Charles Grant (Royal Navy officer) (1770–1824), Royal Navy commodore
- Charles James William Grant (1861–1932), Scottish recipient of the Victoria Cross
- Charles Grant (British Army officer) (1877–1950), British Army General

== Politics ==
- Charles Grant (British East India Company) (1746–1823), British politician
- Charles Grant, 1st Baron Glenelg (1778–1866), Scottish politician
- Charles Henry Grant (1831–1901), engineer and politician in colonial Tasmania (Australia)
- Charles Grant (Australian politician) (1878–1943), Australian senator

== Sports ==
- Charles Grant (defensive end) (born 1978), American football defensive end
- Charles Grant (offensive tackle) (born 2002), American football offensive tackle
- Charlie Grant (1874–1932), American baseball player

== Others ==
- Charles William Grant, 5th Baron de Longueuil (1782–1848)
- Charles James Irwin Grant, 6th Baron de Longueuil (1815–1879), Anglo-Canadian nobleman
- Charles Colmore Grant, 7th Baron de Longueuil (1844–1898)
- Charlie Grant (activist) (1902–1980), Canadian human rights activist
- Charles Grant (bishop) (1906–1989), English prelate of the Roman Catholic Church

== Other uses ==
- Charles Grant, a fictional character in the film Fantastic Voyage
- Charles Grant (1810 EIC ship), built at Bombay for the British East India Company
