= Ronald Charles Grant, 10th Baron de Longueuil =

British soldier and peer

Ronald Charles Grant, 10th Baron de Longueuil (13 March 1888 – 12 July 1959) was a British soldier and peer. He was born in Pau, France, the son of John Moore Charles de Bienville Grant. He married Ernestine Hester Maud Bowes-Lyon, daughter of the Hon. Ernest Bowes-Lyon and Isobel Hester Drummond, on 4 October 1918. He was educated at Elizabeth College, Guernsey. He was in the French Foreign Legion and was a civil engineer.

He succeeded to the title of Baron de Longueuil on 17 October 1935. He fought in the Second World War as an officer in the service of the 3rd Battalion, King's Own Yorkshire Light Infantry. He died in Navarrenx, France in 1959.

== Ancestry ==
Ancestors of Ronald Charles Grant, 10th Baron de Longueuil

16. David Alexander Grant
8. Charles William Grant, 5th Baron de Longueuil
17. Marie-Charles Le Moyne, 4th Baroness de Longueuil
4. Charles James Irwin Grant, 6th Baron de Longueuil
18. John Coffin
9. Caroline Coffin
19. Anne Matthews
2. John Charles Moore Grant, 9th Baron de Longueuil
20. Peter Trapman
10. Louis Trapman
21. Eva Maria Lemme
5. Anne Marie Catherine Trapman
22. John Elias Moore
11. Mary Bowen Moore
23. Frances Bowen
1. Ronald Charles Grant, 10th Baron de Longueuil
24. Eustace Barron
12. William Leonard Barron
25. Catalina Cantillon
6. Joseph Barron
13. Mary Catherine Murphy
3. Maria-Carlotta Barron
14. William Robert Walkinshaw
7. Roberta Walkinshaw
15. Francisca Garriz

French nobility recognized by the Crown in right of Canada
Preceded by John Charles Moore Grant	Baron de Longueuil; 1938-1959	Succeeded by Raymond Grant
