= List of 2008 Canadian incumbents =

== Crown ==
Monarch - Queen Elizabeth II

== Federal government ==
- Governor General - Michaëlle Jean

=== Cabinet ===
- Prime Minister - Stephen Harper
- Minister of Finance - Jim Flaherty
- Minister of Foreign Affairs
  - Maxime Bernier (to May 26)
  - David Emerson (October 20-October 30)
  - Lawrence Cannon (from October 30)
- Minister of National Defence - Peter MacKay
- Minister of Health
  - Tony Clement (to October 30)
  - Leona Aglukkaq (from October 30)
- Minister of Industry - Maxime Bernier
- Minister of Heritage - Bev Oda
- Minister of Intergovernmental Affairs - Rona Ambrose
- Minister of the Environment - John Baird
- Minister of Justice - Rob Nicholson
- Minister of Transport - Lawrence Cannon
- Minister of Citizenship and Immigration - Diane Finley
- Minister of Fisheries and Oceans - Loyola Hearn
- Minister of Agriculture and Agri-Food - Chuck Strahl
- Minister of Public Works and Government Services - Michael Fortier
- Minister of Natural Resources - Gary Lunn
- Minister of Human Resources and Skills Development - Monte Solberg

== Members of Parliament ==
See: 39th Canadian parliament, 40th Canadian parliament

=== Party leaders ===
- Liberal Party of Canada - Stéphane Dion to December 10 Michael Ignatieff
- Conservative Party of Canada - Stephen Harper
- Bloc Québécois - Gilles Duceppe
- New Democratic Party - Jack Layton
- Green Party of Canada - Elizabeth May

=== Supreme Court justices ===
- Chief Justice: Beverley McLachlin
- Marshall Rothstein
- Michel Bastarache
- William Ian Corneil Binnie
- Louis LeBel
- Marie Deschamps
- Morris Fish
- Louise Charron
- Rosalie Abella

=== Other ===
- Speaker of the House of Commons - Peter Milliken
- Governor of the Bank of Canada - David Dodge
- Chief of the Defence Staff - General Rick Hillier to July 1 General Walter J. Natynczyk

== Provinces & Territories ==
=== Lieutenant-governors ===
- Lieutenant Governor of Alberta - Norman Kwong
- Lieutenant Governor of British Columbia - Steven Point
- Lieutenant Governor of Manitoba - John Harvard
- Lieutenant Governor of New Brunswick - Herménégilde Chiasson
- Lieutenant Governor of Newfoundland and Labrador - Edward Roberts to John Crosbie
- Lieutenant Governor of Nova Scotia - Mayann Francis
- Lieutenant Governor of Ontario - David Onley
- Lieutenant Governor of Prince Edward Island - Barbara Hagerman
- Lieutenant Governor of Quebec - Pierre Duchesne
- Lieutenant Governor of Saskatchewan - Gordon Barnhart

=== Premiers ===
- Premier of Alberta - Ed Stelmach
- Premier of British Columbia - Gordon Campbell
- Premier of Manitoba - Gary Doer
- Premier of New Brunswick - Shawn Graham
- Premier of Newfoundland and Labrador - Danny Williams
- Premier of Nova Scotia - Rodney MacDonald
- Premier of Ontario - Dalton McGuinty
- Premier of Prince Edward Island - Pat Binns
- Premier of Quebec - Jean Charest
- Premier of Saskatchewan - Lorne Calvert
- Premier of the Northwest Territories - Joe Handley
- Premier of Nunavut - Paul Okalik (January 1 – November 14), Eva Aariak (November 14 – )
- Premier of Yukon - Dennis Fentie

== Mayors ==
see also list of mayors in Canada

- Toronto - David Miller
- Montreal - Gérald Tremblay
- Vancouver - Sam Sullivan → Gregor Robertson
- Ottawa - Larry O'Brien
- Winnipeg - Sam Katz
- Edmonton - Stephen Mandel
- Calgary - Dave Bronconnier
- Victoria - Alan Lowe

== Religious leaders ==
- Roman Catholic Archbishop of Quebec and Primate of Canada - Cardinal Archbishop Marc Ouellet
- Roman Catholic Archbishop of Montreal - Cardinal Archbishop Jean-Claude Turcotte
- Roman Catholic Bishops of London - Bishop Ronald Peter Fabbro
- Roman Catholic Archbishop of Toronto - Archbishop Thomas Christopher Collins
- Primate of the Anglican Church of Canada - Fred Hiltz
- Moderator of the United Church of Canada - David Giuliano
- Moderator of the Presbyterian Church in Canada - Wilma Welsh
- National Bishop of the Evangelical Lutheran Church in Canada - Raymond Schultz

== Peer ==
- Michael Grant, 12th Baron de Longueuil

== See also ==
- 2007 Canadian incumbents
- Events in Canada in 2008
- incumbents around the world in 2008
- Canadian incumbents by year
