= Ernestine Bowes-Lyon =

- Born: Ernestine Hester Maude Bowes-Lyon; 19 December 1891; Glamis Castle, Scotland
- Died: 6 January 1981 (aged 89); Navarrenx, France
- Title: Baroness de Longueuil
- Spouse: Ronald Charles Grant, 10th Baron de Longueuil
- Children: Raoul Grant; Raymond Grant, 11th Baron de Longueuil
- Parent(s): Hon. Ernest Bowes-Lyon; Isobel Hester Drummond

Ernestine Hester Maude Bowes-Lyon, Baroness de Longueuil (19 December 1891 – 6 January 1981) was born at Glamis Castle in Scotland, one of five children; her father Ernest Bowes-Lyon (son of the 13th Earl of Strathmore) died eight days after her birth, two days after Christmas, in a riding accident. He was a diplomat serving as a consul in Belgrade. Her mother was a Drummond, of the family of Drummonds Bank.

== Early life ==
Ernestine was born on 19 December 1891 as the youngest daughter of Ernest Bowes-Lyon (1858–1891) and his wife, Isobel Hester Drummond (1860–1945). She grew up at Glamis Castle along with her younger cousin Elizabeth Bowes-Lyon, the future Queen Elizabeth the Queen Mother, and learnt to drive a coach and four down Glamis drive. During her early years she met and learned from poets, writers, philosophers, and other intelligentsia. Writer P. G. Wodehouse, in particular, remained a friend and correspondent until his death; one of his last letters written was to her. Wodehouse dedicated his book The Pothunters to Ernestine Bowes-Lyon.

== Marriages ==
In 1910, she married Francis Winstone Scott (1882–1948), and had two sons. They were divorced in 1918. Her second marriage was to Ronald Grant de Longueuil, 10th Baron de Longueuil (13 March 1888 – 12 July 1959), whom she first met at the Christmas Ball of the Tate family, (Tate Gallery) in December 1913. Their elopement was the cause of some scandal. She accompanied him to the Western Front, where she worked as a nursing assistant. They were reunited after the declaration of the Armistice. He, war-weary and uncertain of his future, asked her to return to her family. In protest at this, she shot herself in the chest with a revolver, but survived with the bullet lodged by her heart. In hospital she informed him that she was pregnant. Ronald and Ernestine moved to the chateau of Sus, near Navarrenx in the south west of France. Raoul Charles was born in 1919, and Raymond de Longueuil in 1921. Raoul became a naval aviator, and was killed over the North Sea in 1942 in pursuit of the Nazi Tirpitz Battleship. Raymond, the second born, inherited the title Baron de Longueuil.

== Later life and death ==
She enjoyed outdoor life as well as high society, knew her flowers and the stars, and sketched and painted in watercolour; in 1970 she had her own exhibition in France and was reviewed in a number of local papers. She told stories to her grandson Michael Grant about Glamis Castle being haunted and her experiences there.

She led quite a social life between Navarrenx and Pau, and with her husband travelled widely in Europe, especially Switzerland. She drove up until she was 85; usually a big Citroen DS classic. She had her hip replaced in 1976 and was swimming in the river six months later. In fact, she had been swimming in the local river up to six months before she died. The bullet lodged in her heart remained there for over 60 years until her death at age 89 at Navarrenx. She was survived by her sister, Marjorie Effie Winter (1889–1981).

Her great-granddaughter is the actress and adventurer Rachel Grant de Longueuil, best known for her role as Bond girl Peaceful in the James Bond film Die Another Day.

== Ancestry ==
Ancestors of Ernestine Bowes-Lyon

16. Thomas Lyon-Bowes, 11th Earl of Strathmore and Kinghorne
8. Thomas Lyon-Bowes, Lord Glamis
17. Mary Elizabeth Louisa Rodney Carpenter
4. Claude Bowes-Lyon, 13th Earl of Strathmore and Kinghorne
18. Joseph Valentine Grimstead
9. Charlotte Grimstead
19. Charlotte Jane Sarah Walsh
2. Hon. Ernest Bowes-Lyon
20. George Smith
10. Oswald Smith
21. Frances Mary Mosley
5. Frances Dora Smith
22. Robert Hodgson
11. Henrietta Hodgson
23. Mary Tucker
1. Ernestine Bowes-Lyon
24. John Drummond
12. John Drummond
25. Hester Cholmondeley
6. Harvey Drummond
26. Sir Eliab Harvey
13. Georgina Augusta Harvey
27. Lady Louisa Nugent
3. Isobel Hester Drummond
28. George Drummond
14. Andrew Mortimer Drummond
29. Martha Harley
7. Susan Caroline Drummond
30. Algernon Percy, 1st Earl of Beverley
15. Lady Emily Charlotte Percy
31. Susan Isabella Burrell
