= Michael Grant, 12th Baron de Longueuil =

British nobleman

Michael Grant
- Baron de Longueuil
- Shield of the coat of arms
- Born: Michael Grant de Longueuil; 1947 (age 78–79)
- Spouses: Isabel Padua, Susan Casey
- Issue: Angela, Rachel, Rebecca, David
- Parents: Raymond Grant, 11th Baron de Longueill; Anne Maltby
- Occupation: Medical practitioner, painter

Michael Charles Grant, 12th Baron de Longueuil (born 1947) is a British nobleman possessing the only French colonial title recognized by the Monarch of Canada, currently his third cousin, Charles III.

== Assumption of title and royal connection ==
He assumed the Canadian title of Baron of Longueuil in 2004 upon the death of his father, Raymond Grant, in Navarrenx, near Pau, France.

He is related to the monarch through his grandmother, Ernestine Maude Bowes-Lyon. She was first cousin to Lady Elizabeth Bowes-Lyon, later Queen Elizabeth the Queen Mother. The baron was a second cousin, once removed, to Queen Elizabeth II.

== Career, art and residence ==
A medical practitioner, Grant de Longueuil has interests in palliative medicine, working for 13 years at Hayward House. His interest in pain control led him to take a degree in clinical hypnosis.

== Family ==
Grant de Longueuil has been married twice.

His first wife was Isabel Padua, born in the Philippines and of mixed Spanish and Filipino origin. Together, they have three daughters: Angela (b. 1974), a dance instructor; Rachel (b. 1977), an actress; and Rebecca (b. 1982), also an actress.

His second wife is Susan Casey, daughter of the BBC comedy writer and producer James Casey. They have one son, David Grant (b. 1984), heir apparent to the noble title of his father.

== Family seat ==
The Barons de Longueuil have not lived in Canada for several generations, having lived in United Kingdom, France, and the Philippines.

The original seigneury was sold in the early 1800s. The Kingston home of the barons, Alwington House, was sold out of the family in 1910. In 1993, the current baron and his wife visited the Longueuil Castle or Ardath Castle grounds on Wolfe Island, Ontario, without making any claim to them. Ardath Castle had been in the family as early as 1795, when the Grant family purchased lands in the area.

== Ancestry ==
Ancestors of Michael Grant, 12th Baron de Longueuil

16. Charles James Irwin Grant, 6th Baron de Longueuil
8. John Charles Moore Grant, 9th Baron de Longueuil
17. Anne Marie Catherine Trapman
4. Ronald Charles Grant, 10th Baron de Longueuil
18. Joseph Barron
9. Maria-Carlotta Barron
19. Roberta Walkinshaw
2. Raymond Grant, 11th Baron de Longueuil
20. Claude Bowes-Lyon, 13th Earl of Strathmore and Kinghorne
10. Hon. Ernest Bowes-Lyon
21. Frances Dora Smith
5. Ernestine Hester Maud Bowes-Lyon
22. Harvey Drummond
11. Isobel Hester Drummond
23. Susan Caroline Drummond
1. Michael Grant, 12th Baron de Longueuil
6. Patrick Maltby
3. Anne Maltby

== See also ==
- Baron de Longueuil
- Canadian Hereditary Peers
- Canadian titles debate
- City of Longueuil, Quebec, Canada

French nobility recognized by the Crown in right of Canada
Preceded by Raymond Grant	Baron de Longueuil; 2004-	Incumbent
