= Charles William Grant =

Charles William Grant may refer to:

- Charles Grant (Australian politician) (1878–1943)
- Charles William Grant, 5th Baron de Longueuil (1782–1848)
