= List of 2005 Canadian incumbents =

== Crown ==
- Head of State - Queen Elizabeth II

== Federal government ==
- Governor General - Adrienne Clarkson then Michaëlle Jean

=== Cabinet ===
- Prime Minister - Paul Martin
- Deputy Prime Minister - Anne McLellan
- Minister of Finance - Ralph Goodale
- Minister of Foreign Affairs - Pierre Pettigrew
- Minister of National Defence - Bill Graham
- Minister of Health - Ujjal Dosanjh
- Minister of Industry - David Emerson
- Minister of Heritage - Liza Frulla
- Minister of Intergovernmental Affairs - Lucienne Robillard
- Minister of the Environment - Stéphane Dion
- Minister of Justice - Irwin Cotler
- Minister of Transport - Jean Lapierre
- Minister of Citizenship and Immigration - Judy Sgro then Joe Volpe
- Minister of Fisheries and Oceans - Geoff Regan
- Minister of Agriculture and Agri-Food - Andy Mitchell
- Minister of Public Works and Government Services - Scott Brison
- Minister of Natural Resources - John Efford
- Minister of Human Resources and Skills Development - Joe Volpe then Lucienne Robillard then Belinda Stronach
- Minister of Social Development - Ken Dryden

== Members of Parliament ==
See: 38th Canadian parliament

=== Party leaders ===
- Liberal Party of Canada - Paul Martin
- Conservative Party of Canada - Stephen Harper
- Bloc Québécois - Gilles Duceppe
- New Democratic Party - Jack Layton

=== Supreme Court justices ===
- Chief Justice: Beverley McLachlin
- John C. Major
- Michel Bastarache
- William Ian Corneil Binnie
- Louis LeBel
- Marie Deschamps
- Morris Fish
- Louise Charron
- Rosalie Abella

=== Other ===
- Speaker of the House of Commons - Peter Milliken
- Governor of the Bank of Canada - David Dodge
- Chief of the Defence Staff - General R.R. Henault, then General Rick Hillier

== Provinces and Territories ==
=== Premiers ===
- Premier of Alberta - Ralph Klein
- Premier of British Columbia - Gordon Campbell
- Premier of Manitoba - Gary Doer
- Premier of New Brunswick - Bernard Lord
- Premier of Newfoundland and Labrador - Danny Williams
- Premier of Nova Scotia - John Hamm
- Premier of Ontario - Dalton McGuinty
- Premier of Prince Edward Island - Pat Binns
- Premier of Quebec - Jean Charest
- Premier of Saskatchewan - Lorne Calvert
- Premier of the Northwest Territories - Joe Handley
- Premier of Nunavut - Paul Okalik
- Premier of Yukon - Dennis Fentie

=== Commissioners ===
- Commissioner of Yukon - Jack Cable then Geraldine Van Bibber
- Commissioners of Northwest Territories - Glenna Hansen then Tony Whitford
- Commissioners of Nunavut - Peter Irniq then Ann Meekitjuk Hanson

=== Lieutenant-governors ===
- Lieutenant-Governor of Alberta - Lois Hole, then Normie Kwong
- Lieutenant-Governor of British Columbia - Iona Campagnolo
- Lieutenant-Governor of Manitoba - John Harvard
- Lieutenant-Governor of New Brunswick - Herménégilde Chiasson
- Lieutenant-Governor of Newfoundland and Labrador - Edward Roberts
- Lieutenant-Governor of Nova Scotia - Myra Freeman
- Lieutenant-Governor of Ontario - James Bartleman
- Lieutenant-Governor of Prince Edward Island - Léonce Bernard
- Lieutenant-Governor of Quebec - Lise Thibault
- Lieutenant-Governor of Saskatchewan - Lynda Haverstock

== Mayors ==
see also list of mayors in Canada

- Toronto - David Miller
- Montreal - Gérald Tremblay
- Vancouver - Larry Campbell
- Ottawa - Bob Chiarelli
- Winnipeg - Sam Katz
- Edmonton - Stephen Mandel
- Calgary - Dave Bronconnier
- Victoria - Alan Lowe

== Religious leaders ==
- Roman Catholic Archbishop of Quebec and Primate of Canada - Cardinal Archbishop Marc Ouellet
- Roman Catholic Archbishop of Montreal - Cardinal Archbishop Jean-Claude Turcotte
- Roman Catholic Bishops of London - Bishop Ronald Peter Fabbro
- Roman Catholic Archbishop of Toronto - Cardinal Archbishop Aloysius Ambrozic
- Primate of the Anglican Church of Canada - Andrew Hutchison
- Moderator of the United Church of Canada - Peter Short
- Moderator of the Presbyterian Church in Canada - Richard Fee
- National Bishop of the Evangelical Lutheran Church in Canada - Raymond Schultz

== See also ==
- 2004 Canadian incumbents
- Events in Canada in 2005
- 2006 Canadian incumbents
- incumbents around the world in 2005
- Canadian incumbents by year
