= Raymond Schultz =

Raymond Schultz may refer to:

- Raymond Schultz (bishop), bishop of the Evangelical Lutheran Church in Canada
- Raymond Schultz (figure skater) (born 1990), Canadian pair skater
- Ray Schultz (born 1976), Canadian ice hockey player
