= Gurs =

- Commune
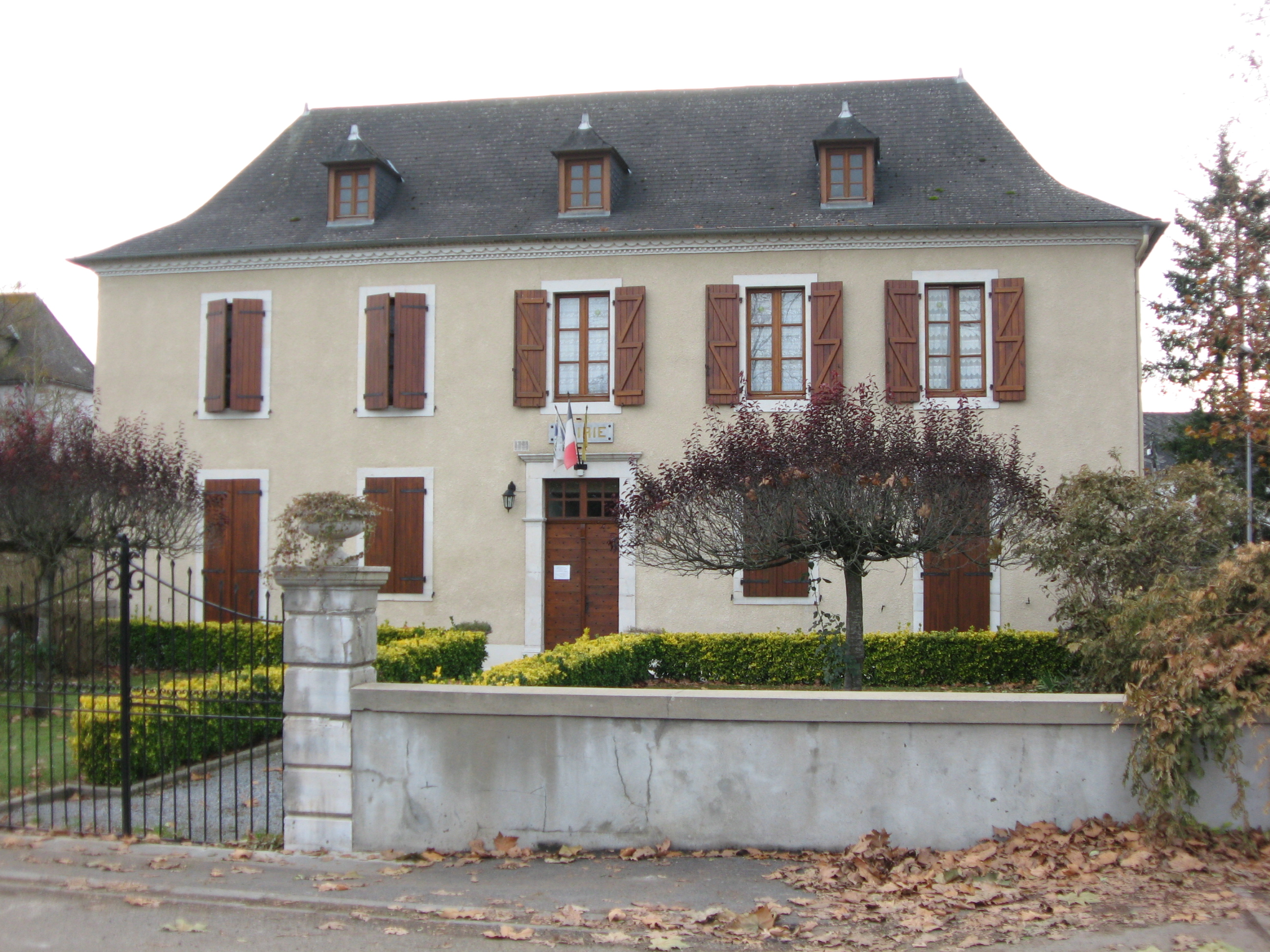
- The town hall of Gurs

- Coat of arms
- Location of Gurs
- Location within France Location within Nouvelle-Aquitaine
- Coordinates: 43°17′18″N 0°45′09″W
- Country: France
- Region: Nouvelle-Aquitaine
- Department: Pyrénées-Atlantiques
- Arrondissement: Oloron-Sainte-Marie
- Canton: Le Cœur de Béarn
- Intercommunality: Béarn des Gaves

Government
  - Mayor (2020–2026): Christian Puharré
- Area^{1}: 10.96 km^{2} (4.23 sq mi)
- Elevation: 178 m (584 ft)
- Highest elevation: 254 m (833 ft)
- Lowest elevation: 119 m (390 ft)
- Population (2023): 418
  - Density: 38.1/km^{2} (98.8/sq mi)
- Time zone: UTC+01:00 (CET)
  - Summer (DST): UTC+02:00 (CEST)
- INSEE/Postal code: 64253 /64190
- ^{1} French Land Register data, which excludes lakes, ponds, glaciers > 1 km^{2} (0.386 sq mi or 247 acres) and river estuaries.

Gurs (French pronunciation: [ɡyʁs]) is a village in the Pyrénées-Atlantiques department in southwestern France.

== History ==
Gurs was the site of the Gurs internment camp. Nothing remains of the camp; after World War II, a forest was planted on the site where it stood.

== Geography ==
Gurs is located near Pau.

Neighboring communes:

- Jasses - northwest
- Sus - northwest
- Dognen - east
- Moncayolle-Larrory-Mendibieu - west
- L'Hôpital-Saint-Blaise - southwest
- Préchacq-Josbaig - south

== See also ==
- Communes of the Pyrénées-Atlantiques department
- Gurs internment camp
