= Purifier =

Purifier(s) may refer to:

- Air purifier, a device that filters pollution out of the air
- Water purification, removing contaminants from water, sometimes using a water purifier
- The Purifiers, a 2004 action film
- Purifiers (Marvel Comics), a fictional terrorist organization
