= Jean Devaines =

French state bureaucrat and journalist

Jean Devaines (c. 1735, Paris – 15 March 1803) was a French state bureaucrat and journalist. He was a relation of Eusèbe de Salverte and a friend of Julie de Lespinasse.

He served as chief clerk of finance under Anne Robert Jacques Turgot, then as administrator of state domains and receiver of finances. He was succeeded as chief clerk of finance by Bertrand Dufresne in 1777.
