= Sus, Pyrénées-Atlantiques =

Sus
- Commune
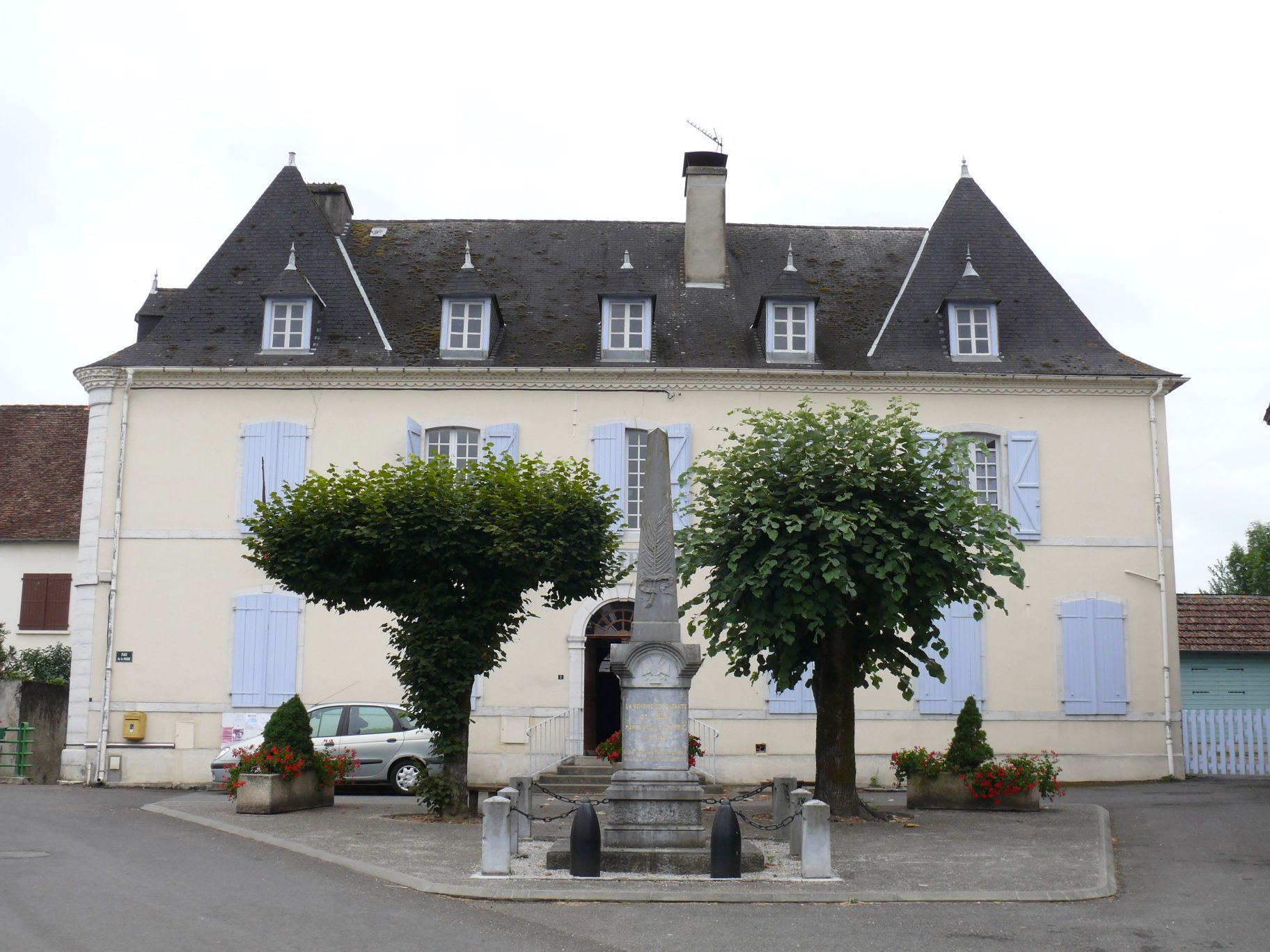
- The town hall and school
- Location of Sus
- Location within France Location within Nouvelle-Aquitaine
- Coordinates: 43°18′26″N 0°45′55″W
- Country: France
- Region: Nouvelle-Aquitaine
- Department: Pyrénées-Atlantiques
- Arrondissement: Oloron-Sainte-Marie
- Canton: Le Cœur de Béarn
- Intercommunality: Béarn des Gaves

Government
  - Mayor (2020–2026): Jean-Paul Lendre
- Area^{1}: 11.50 km^{2} (4.44 sq mi)
- Elevation: 164 m (538 ft)
- Highest elevation: 263 m (863 ft)
- Lowest elevation: 118 m (387 ft)
- Population (2023): 371
  - Density: 32.3/km^{2} (83.6/sq mi)
- Time zone: UTC+01:00 (CET)
  - Summer (DST): UTC+02:00 (CEST)
- INSEE/Postal code: 64529 /64190
- ^{1} French Land Register data, which excludes lakes, ponds, glaciers > 1 km^{2} (0.386 sq mi or 247 acres) and river estuaries.

Sus (French pronunciation: [sys]; Basque: Xütxe) is a commune in the Pyrénées-Atlantiques department and Nouvelle-Aquitaine region of southwestern France. The town is located on the borders of Susmiou, Gurs and Navarrenx. The population was 377 as of 2019.

== Geography ==
Sus is in the Oloron-Sainte-Marie arrondissement in the southern part of Nouvelle-Aquitaine. Sus is 1.4 km (0.9 mi) from Susmiou, 1.8 km (1.1 mi) from Navarrenx, 2.5 km (1.6 mi) from Gurs, 13.2 km (8.2 mi) from Mourenx, 32.1 km (19.9 mi) from Pau, and 60.8 km (37.8 mi) from Bayonne. It sits west of the Gave d'Oloron river. On the opposite side of the river is Jasses.

== See also ==
- Communes of the Pyrénées-Atlantiques department
