= One Little Pill =

- Directed by: Adam Schomer
- Written by: Adam Schomer
- Produced by: Adam Schomer; Claudia Christian
- Narrated by: Claudia Christian
- Cinematography: Scott Mathias Chrisman
- Edited by: Barry Rubinow
- Music by: Michael Mollura
- Production companies: Zard Productions i2i Productions
- Release dates: August 23, 2014 (HollyShorts Film Festival); October 1, 2014
- Running time: 50 minutes
- Country: United States
- Language: English

One Little Pill is a documentary film about the use of generic medications (primarily naltrexone, but also nalmefene) for treating and curing alcoholism. The primary focus is on the Sinclair method, which pairs these medications with continued drinking. It was produced by Zard Productions as a film project for the C Three Foundation and released on Vimeo and VHX for on-demand viewing in October 2014. As of August 2015, DVD-R copies are also available.

== Synopsis ==
One Little Pill is a documentary film about the Sinclair method of treating alcohol abuse. The film follows the lives of several people who have suffered from alcoholism, and have been helped by the treatment. Perspectives from scientists, treatment centers, doctors, and a legal prosecutor are also presented.

Claudia comes across as really down to earth and wanting to help others, and helps bring the different elements of the film together. This certainly makes a welcome change, to celebrities going on about the 12-step solution.

— Michael D. (Lovinglife52), Recovering From Recovery

The film describes the application of opioid blockers (naltrexone or nalmefene) as an alternative to help alcohol addicts in place of other more mainstream solutions such as twelve-step programs. The treatment is claimed by the C Three Foundation to have a 78% success rate in remedying alcohol dependence. Naltrexone is FDA approved for use in the United States. In 2013/4 the Scottish Medicines Consortium (SMC) approved nalmefene for use as part of the NHS National Services Scotland. Some studies have shown the treatment to be effective in reducing the urge to drink.

The treatment is described in the film as follows: a single dosage of naltrexone is taken one hour before drinking alcohol, but not on other occasions. Over the following months, most users will begin to drink alcohol less frequently or in smaller quantities. Usually after 3 to 4 months (but occasionally 15 months), successful practitioners are no longer addicted; some people give up drinking alcohol altogether, while others become social drinkers. If they choose to continue to drink, the patients have to continue taking the drug as needed for life. Therapy may optionally also be used.

== Release ==
In July 2014 the first sale of the documentary was announced. YLE TV Finland showed the film in March 2015 and the film page received more than 14,000 views.
A special showing of the film occurred on August 23, 2014 at the HollyShorts Film Festival.
Purchase and rental of the movie via video on demand was announced in September 2014.

== Production ==
The executive producers Adam Schomer and Claudia Christian financed the film by a campaign on the crowd funding website Indiegogo, with additional finance from Fundly, general donations and special fund raisers. The film was made by the C Three Foundation, a nonprofit organization created by actress Claudia Christian. She is a proponent of the Sinclair method, which she credits for saving her life in 2009.

== See also ==
- Alcoholism#Sinclair Method
- Naltrexone#Alcohol use disorder
