= John Charles Moore Grant, 9th Baron de Longueuil =

John Charles Moore de Bienville Grant, 9th Baron de Longueuil was born in 1861 at Bath, Somerset. He was the son of Charles James Irwin Grant and Anne Marie Catherine Trapman. He succeeded to the title of Baron de Longueuil on 3 August 1931. He died on 17 October 1935 at Pau, France.

== Ancestry ==
Ancestors of John Charles Moore Grant, 9th Baron de Longueuil

16. David Grant
8. David Alexander Grant
17. Elizabeth Richardson
4. Charles William Grant, 5th Baron de Longueuil
18. Charles-Jacques Le Moyne, 3rd Baron de Longueuil
9. Marie-Charles-Joseph Le Moyne, Baronne de Longueuil
19. Marie-Anne Catherine Fleury
2. Charles James Irwin Grant, 6th Baron de Longueuil
20. Nathaniel Coffin
10. John Coffin
21. Elizabeth Barnes
5. Caroline Coffin
22. William Matthews
11. Anne Matthews
23. Anne Radcliffe Wilson
1. John Charles Moore Grant, 9th Baron de Longueuil
12. Peter Trapman
6. Louis Trapman
13. Eva Marie Lemme
3. Anne Marie Catherine Trapman
14. John Elias Moore
7. Mary Bowen Moore
15. Frances Bowen

French nobility recognized by the Crown in right of Canada
Preceded by Reginald Charles Grant	Baron de Longueuil; 1931–1938	Succeeded by Ronald Charles Grant
