= Bertrand Dufresne =

French financier, civil servant and politician (1736–1801)

Director of the Treasury
- In office 21 January 1800 – 21/22 February 1801

Member of the Council of Five Hundred
- In office 10 April – 4 September 1797

Director of the Treasury
- In office September 1790–1792

Personal details
- Born: 24 November 1736 Navarrenx, Kingdom of France
- Died: 22 February 1801 (aged 64) Paris, French First Republic

Bertrand Dufresne (24 November 1736 – 21/22 February 1801) was a French financier, civil servant and politician, who served in multiple senior government positions before and after the French Revolution.

== Early life ==
Born on 24 November 1736 in Navarrenx, his father was Nicolas du Fraine, a cordwainer from Versailles, who after moving to Bearn married Anne Campagnet, a local Cagot woman. In 1748 Dufresne was able to move to Bayonne to work as a bank clerk under the tutelage of Jean-François de La Borde, then he worked for a trading firm in Bordeaux.

== Later life ==
La Borde later recommended Dufresne to Étienne François de Choiseul, who in 1764 appointed him to the Court Bank in Versailles under Jean-Joseph de Laborde. By 1767 he was one of the two main cashiers of the Caisse d'Escompte, during which time he owned and lived at 22 Place Vendôme. An edict of July 1775 merged six pre-existing offices into the Parisian Court of Accounts, which he was appointed the controller-paymaster of. In 1777 the Director-General of the Royal Treasury, Jacques Necker, made him premier commis des finances, in charge of the Trésorerie générale du Royaume, replacing Jean Devaines. He reorganised the office of general revenue in 1781. He was later appointed receiver general at the Généralité de Rouen in 1782.

The support of the then Controller-General of Finances, Necker, enabled him to become a councillor of state, the intendant general of the French navy, and then from September 1790 until 1792, the director general of the public treasury; during this period he lived on Rue de Richelieu. In this period he was praised by his colleagues for his dedication to work and skill in finance.

In August 1791 he had to step aside for the six commissioners of the new National treasury. Through the revolutionary period Dufresne was a monarchist. Imprisoned during the Reign of Terror, he was then released and elected deputy for the Seine in the Council of Five Hundred on 21 Germinal in Year V (10 April 1797) and was placed in charge of public finances. As secretary of the council, he was also in charge of supplies to the armies.

Dufresne was expelled after the coup of 18 Fructidor in Year V (4 September 1797), but as a long-time ally of Charles-François Lebrun, he was finally appointed to the Conseil d'État after the coup of 18 Brumaire in Year VIII (9 November 1799). He was then appointed director general of the treasury on 1 Pluviôse in Year VIII (21 January 1800), under finance minister Martin-Michel-Charles Gaudin.

== Death ==
Dufresne died on either the 2 or 3 Ventôse in Year IX (21 or 22 February 1801). In honour of his work, Napoleon Bonaparte commissioned a bust of Dufresne to be placed within the treasury, which was dedicated on 30 Pluviôse in Year X (19 February 1802) by his successor François Barbé-Marbois.
