= A Masterpiece of Murder =

1986 American made-for-television film

- Genre: Comedy; Mystery
- Written by: Andrew J. Fenady; Terry Nation
- Directed by: Charles S. Dubin
- Starring: Bob Hope; Don Ameche
- Music by: Richard Markowitz
- Country of origin: United States
- Original language: English

Production
- Executive producer: Andrew J. Fenady
- Producer: Terry Morse Jr.
- Production location: Vancouver
- Cinematography: Laszlo George
- Editor: Art Seid
- Running time: 100 min.
- Production companies: 20th Century Fox Television; Andrew J. Fenady Productions

Original release
- Network: NBC
- Release: January 27, 1986

A Masterpiece of Murder is a 1986 American TV movie starring Bob Hope and Don Ameche.

It was Hope's first and only made-for-TV movie.

== Plot ==
A retired private eye teams up with a former jewel thief to solve a murder.

== Cast ==
- Bob Hope as Dan Dolan
- Don Ameche as Frank Aherne
- Jayne Meadows as Matilda Hussey
- Claudia Christian as Julia Forsythe
- Yvonne De Carlo as Mrs Murphy
- Anne Francis as Ruth Beekman
- Frank Gorshin as Pierre Rudin
- Steven Keats as Lieutenant Simon Wax
- Kevin McCarthy as Jonathan Hire
- Anita Morris as Lola Crane
- Clive Revill as Vincent Faunce
- Stella Stevens as Deb Potts/Della Vance
- Louise Sorel as Louise
- Joseph Della Sorte as Ugarti Van Meer

== Production ==
The film was shot in Vancouver.
