= Claudia Christian =

American actress (born 1965)

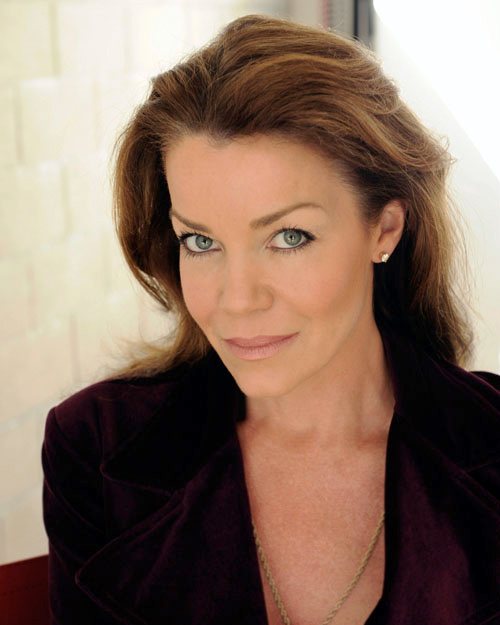
- Claudia Christian in Los Angeles in 2009
- Born: Claudia Ann Coghlan; August 10, 1965 (age 61) Glendale, California, U.S.
- Occupation: Actress
- Years active: 1984–present
- Known for: Babylon 5; Atlantis: The Lost Empire; Hexed; Berrenger's; Columbo: It's All in the Game; Blood of Zeus
- Spouse: Gary DeVore (m. 1988; div. 1992)

Claudia Christian (born Claudia Ann Coghlan, August 10, 1965) is an American actress, known for her roles as Commander Susan Ivanova on Babylon 5, as Captain Maynard on Fox's 9-1-1, and as the voice of Hera on the Netflix series Blood of Zeus. She is also the voice of Lt. Helga Sinclair in Atlantis: The Lost Empire. Christian is the founder and CEO of the C Three Foundation, a proponent of the medication-based Sinclair Method for treating alcohol dependence.

== Early life ==
Claudia Ann Coghlan was born on August 10, 1965, in Glendale, California, the only daughter and youngest child of Hildegard (née Christian), who worked as the director of Giorgio Beverly Hills, and James Michael Coghlan. Her mother is from Germany and her father has Irish ancestry. Christian and her three elder brothers were raised in Connecticut. Her elder brother, Patrick, was killed by a drunk driver while the family lived in Houston, Texas in 1973. The family later moved to California when she was 14. She changed her name by deed poll from Coghlan to Christian and moved to Hollywood to begin her acting career.

== Career ==
Christian's first screen appearance was on Dallas. Further work included television guest appearances on Falcon Crest; Riptide; Hunter; Quantum Leap; Matlock; Murder, She Wrote; L.A. Law; and It's Garry Shandling's Show; and as a series regular on Berrenger's.

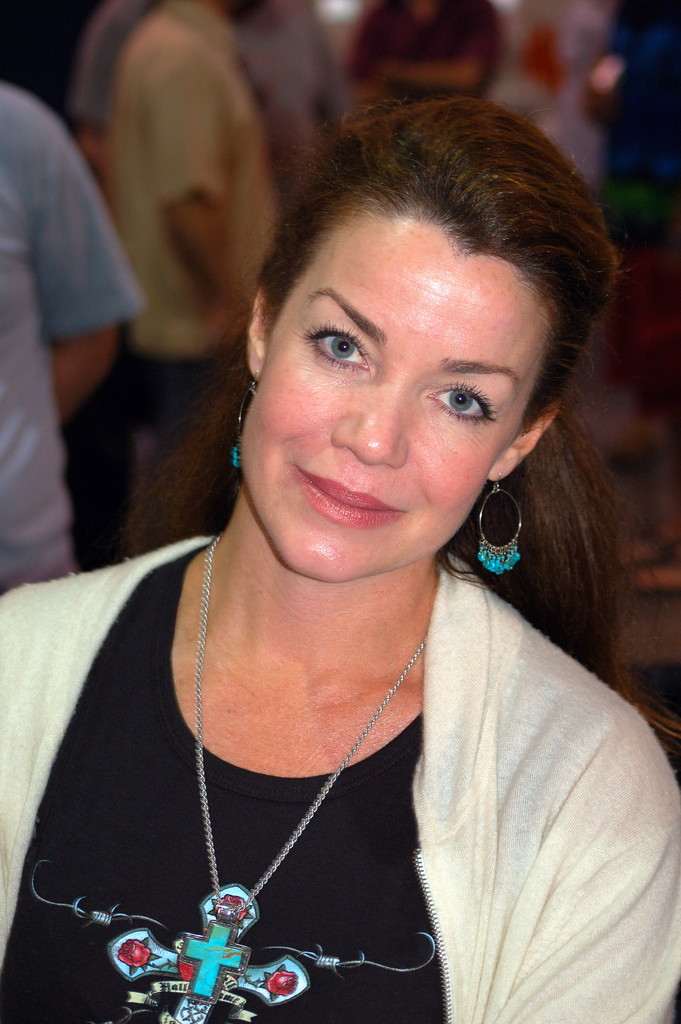
Christian in 2007

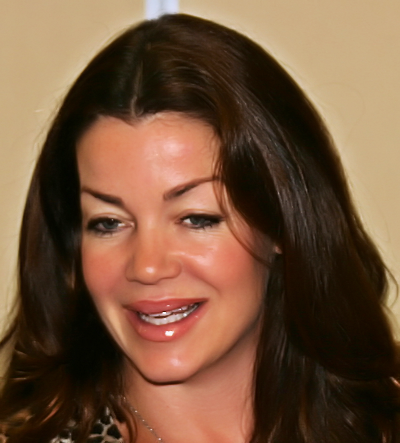
Christian at a convention in Utrecht, Netherlands (2005)

She also appeared in TV movies Lies of the Twins with Isabella Rossellini, Calendar Girl Murders with Sharon Stone, A Masterpiece of Murder with Bob Hope and Don Ameche, Kaleidoscope with Jaclyn Smith and Coleen Dewhurst, and as Faye Dunaway's daughter in Columbo: It's All in the Game.

Christian's film career launched with Clean and Sober opposite Morgan Freeman and Michael Keaton, Never on Tuesday with Andrew Lauer and Peter Berg, The Hidden with Kyle MacLachlan, 20th Century Fox's The Chase with Charlie Sheen, the Columbia comedy Hexed, and Adam Rifkin's The Dark Backward.

From 1994 to 1998, Christian appeared as Commander Susan Ivanova on Babylon 5. She left the science fiction series when contract negotiations for the fifth and final season broke down. Series creator J. Michael Straczynski maintains that she chose to leave of her own accord, while Christian stated that she wished to return for the final season but was released when she requested a reduction in the number of episodes in which she would appear so she could complete another project. Christian reprised the role of Ivanova in the series finale and the television films Babylon 5: In the Beginning and Babylon 5: Thirdspace. She collaborated with cast members on the album The Be Five and conceived her own interactive fan convention, Claudia Con UK, which took place in the UK.

Christian posed for a nude pictorial in the October 1999 issue of Playboy.

Following the success of Babylon 5, Christian guest starred on other series including Highlander: The Series, Judd Apatow's Freaks and Geeks, NYPD Blue, Everwood, Nip/Tuck, Grimm, Criminal Minds, Castle, The Mentalist, and NCIS, and voiced Helga Sinclair in Atlantis: The Lost Empire. In 2004, she returned to Laguna Beach, California, where she attended high school, to star in the American premiere of Michael Weller's play What the Night Is For with Kip Gilman and directed by Richard Stein. She also starred in the British series Starhyke, on Showtime's Look, and in the BBC comedy series Broken News. In addition, Christian played Janine Foster in the Doctor Who audio drama The Reaping and appeared in the films The Garden with Lance Henriksen and Half Past Dead with Steven Seagal.

As of 2020, Christian appears as Captain Elaine Maynard on the Fox series 9-1-1 and as the voice of the goddess Hera in the Netflix series Blood of Zeus. She also plays the title role in the Anne Manx radio series and voices characters in major video games including Call of Duty: Infinite Warfare, The Elder Scrolls V: Skyrim, Fallout 4, and Pizza Morgana. She appeared in Guild Wars 2 as a Norn, and World of Warcraft as Xal'atath.

== Author and advocate ==
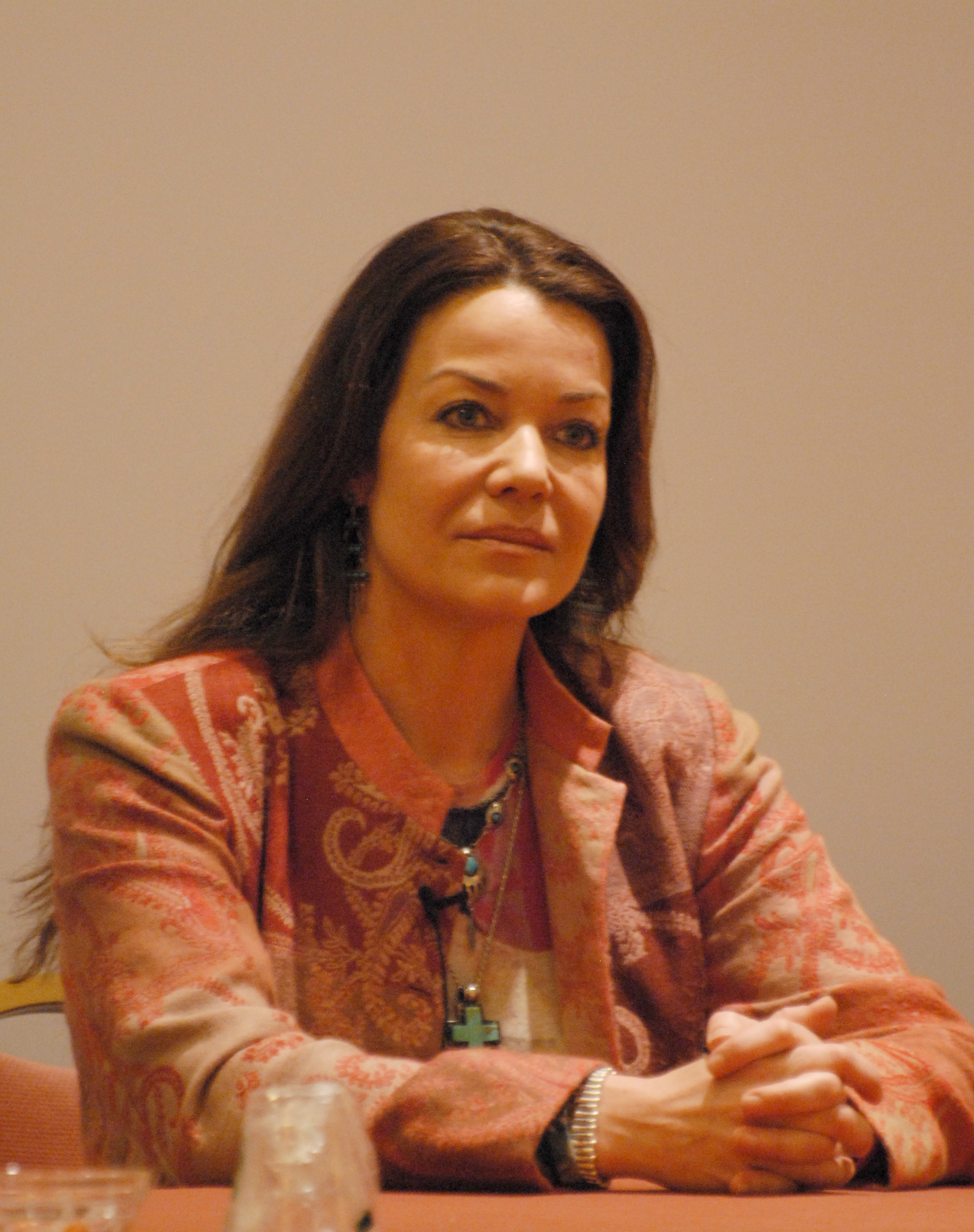
Christian in Italy (2010)

Christian is the author of both fiction and non fiction books. Her fictional works are The Misadventures of Miss Emma Bradford (aka Emma Bradford and the Mystery of Queen Tut), Wolf's Empire: Gladiator, and The Original: The Trials of Sara Larkin.

Together with Chris McAuley, Christian created Dark Legacies, a science-fiction universe. The first of the multimedia projects is a comic-book thriller, funded on Kickstarter in 2022. The project was later expanded with an audiobook from BBV Productions.

Her non fiction works include her initial memoir, My Life with Geeks and Freaks, her updated autobiography Babylon Confidential: A Memoir of Love, Sex, and Addiction, Journeys: Inspirational Stories of Recovery from Alcohol Addiction Using a Breakthrough Scientific Method and a cook book co-authored (with Mark Michel), Snack Hacks. She also wrote the introduction for the second edition of The Cure for Alcoholism: The Medically Proven Way to Eliminate Alcohol Addiction.

Christian is an advocate of The Sinclair Method (TSM), a medication-based method for treating alcohol dependence. TSM involves the targeted use of naltrexone. She credits TSM with saving her life in 2009. To increase awareness of this treatment, she collaborated with Morgan Grant Buchanan to write a book, Babylon Confidential, and made a documentary, One Little Pill, about the science behind this method. In 2013, she founded the 501(c)(3) non-profit organization C Three Foundation to educate medical professionals and people suffering from alcohol dependence about the success of TSM. Christian has spread awareness of TSM through her TEDx talk on the subject, podcast appearances, contributions to magazine articles, and television, newspaper and magazine interviews.

== Filmography ==
=== Film ===
Year	Title	Role	Notes
1984	Calendar Girl Murders	Kara	Television film
1986	A Masterpiece of Murder	Julia Forsythe	Television film
1986	Houston: The Legend of Texas	Eliza Allen	Also known as Gone to Texas
1987	The Hidden	Brenda Lee Van Buren	
1988	Police Story: Monster Manor	Officer Barbara 'Babs' Altoon	
1988	Clean and Sober	Iris	
1989	Never on Tuesday	Tuesday	
1989	Shannon's Deal	Molly Temple	
1989	Tale of Two Sisters	Liz	
1990	Danielle Steel's Kaleidoscope	Meagan	Television film
1990	Mad About You	Casey	
1990	Maniac Cop 2	Officer Susan Riley	
1990	Think Big	Dr. Irene Marsh	
1990	A Gnome Named Gnorm	Samantha	
1991	Lies of the Twins	Felice	
1991	The Woman Who Sinned	Judy Reinhardt	
1991	Strays	Claire Lederer	Television film
1991	The Dark Backward	Kitty	
1991	Arena	Quinn	
1993	Hexed	Hexina	
1993	Relentless: Mind of a Killer	Leeann Hardy	Television film
1994	The Chase	Yvonne Voss	
1997	Lancelot: Guardian of Time	Katherine Shelley	
1997	Mercenary II: Thick & Thin	Patricia Van Lier	
1998	A Wing and a Prayer	Shelley Lowe	
1998	Babylon 5: In the Beginning	Commander Susan Ivanova	
1998	Babylon 5: Thirdspace	Commander Susan Ivanova	
1998	Snide and Prejudice	Renate Müller	
1999	Haunting of Hell House	Lucy	
1999	Running Home	Jules Daniels	
1999	The Substitute 3: Winner Takes All	Andrea 'Andy'	
1999	Final Voyage	Maxine 'Max'	
2000	Love & Sex	Woman in gallery	Cameo
2000	True Rights	Elaine Kilgore	
2001	Atlantis: The Lost Empire	Helga Sinclair	Voice role
2002	Half Past Dead	FBI Agent Ellen 'EZ' Williams	
2002	The Failures	Anna	
2005	The Garden	Dr. Cairns	
2006	The Dot Man	Lieutenant Colonel Dunst	
2008	Serbian Scars	Maggie	Co-producer
2010	Meteor Apocalypse	Kate Dematti	
2012	Strange Frame	Yapnetanchor Zev Raamnoamluka	
2012	Overnight	Sandy	
2012	Rise of an Exile	Hannah Benedict	Pre-production
2013	The Wrong Woman	Officer Ritts	Television film (Lifetime)
2014	Watercolor Postcards	Cheryl	
2014	California Scheming	Mom	
2014	The Writer with No Hands	Herself	
2014	One Little Pill	Herself and The Narrator	Documentary
2014	Red	Marlena	
2017	Chicanery	Abigail Blunt	
2017	The Dot Man	Lieutenant Colonel Dunst	
2018	Dirty Dead Con Men	Donna	
2023	Babylon 5: The Road Home	Commander Susan Ivanova	Voice role; direct-to-video
TBA	The Pipeline	Asta Folkart	Post-production
TBA	Dreadnought: Invasion Six	Lord Marshall (voice)	Pre-production

=== Television series ===
Year	Title	Role	Notes
1984	Webster	Nurse	Episode S1.E14: "George the Patient in Spite of Himself"
1984	T.J. Hooker	Betty MacRae	Episode: "The Lipstick Killer"
1984	Dallas	Peter's friend	Episode: "Some Do...Some Don't"
1984	Falcon Crest	Kate Mars	Episode: "Tests of Faith"
1984	Riptide	Marion Gordon	Episode: "Where the Girls Are"
1984	Hunter	Roxanne Hoffmeyer	Episode: "Love, Hate, and Sporty James"
1984	Mickey Spillane's Mike Hammer	Cassie Conroy	Episodes: "Elegy for a Tramp", "Shots in the Dark"
1985	The A-Team	Cathy Rogers	Episode: "Trouble Brewing"
1986	Blacke's Magic	Laurie Blacke	Episodes: "Breathing Room", "Death Goes to the Movies"
1985	Berrenger's	Melody Hughes	Series regular
1987	The Highwayman	The Highwayman's liaison, Dawn	Episode: "Terror on the Blacktop"
1987	Jake and the Fatman	Lieutenant Alexandra 'Alex' Walker	Episode: "Easy to Love"
1987	It's Garry Shandling's Show	Sylvia	Episode: "Dial L for Laundry"
1989	Quantum Leap	Allison	Episode: "Play It Again, Seymour"
1990	Matlock	Mickey Alder	Episode: "The Blackmailer"
1991	Murder, She Wrote	Bonnie Jenks Hastings	Episode: "Prodigal Father"
1991	L.A. Law	Susan Convers	Episode: "Speak, Lawyers, for Me"
1991	Dark Justice	Dana Hollister Harrison	Episode: "To Die For"
1993	Columbo	Lisa Martin	Feature-length special: "It's All in the Game"
1993	Space Rangers	Marla Baker	Episode: "Death Before Dishonor"
1994–1997	Babylon 5	Commander Susan Ivanova	Main cast, seasons 1–4
1997	The Oz Kids	Queen Aquareine	
1997	Total Security	Cheryl Bankston	Episode: "Pilot"
1997	Highlander: The Series	Katherine	Episode: "Two of Hearts"
1999	Freaks and Geeks	Gloria Haverchuck	Recurring role
2000	Family Law	Carla Sims	Episode: "Are You My Father?"
2001	Relic Hunter	Inez Carson	Episode: "All Choked Up"
2001	Ghostwatch Live	Herself	Presenter
2002	She Spies	Tanya	Episode: "Spy vs. Spies"
2002	NYPD Blue	Catherine Lowell	Episode "Better Laid Than Never"
2003	Everwood	Young Edna	Episode: "My Brother's Keeper"
2004	Starhyke	Captain Belinda Blowhard	Main cast
2005	Broken News	Julia Regan	Series regular
2007	Nip/Tuck	Gwen	Episode: "Dawn Budge II"
2010	Look: The Series	Stella	Series regular
2011	Grimm	Mrs. Clark	Episode "Let Your Hair Down"
2013	Criminal Minds	Agent Gretchen Stern	Episode: "Alchemy"
2014	Castle	Mrs. Logan	Episode: "Law & Boarder"
2014	The Mentalist	Greta Fortensky	Episode: "Black Market"
2017	NCIS	Louise Moreau	Episode: "Willoughby"
2017	Space Diner Tales	Leila Walker	Episode: "Pilot"
2018–present	9-1-1	Captain Elaine Maynard	Recurring role; 17 episodes
2020–2025	Blood of Zeus	Hera	Voice; 16 episodes
2021	Dota: Dragon's Blood	Legatus Tihomir	Voice
2025	Hacks	Nikki Lipka	Episode: "Big, Brave Girl"

=== Video games ===
Year	Title	Role	Note
1995	Solar Eclipse	Major Delany "Raven" Kelt	
2002	Summoner 2	Sangaril, Logosarch, Rosalind, Dama Heras	
2004	Shrek 2	Fairy Godmother, Female Citizens	
2009	Pizza Morgana	Abbie Positive	
2010	Shrek Forever After	Fairy Godmother	Grouped under "Additional Voice Talents"
2011	The Elder Scrolls V: Skyrim	Multiple, including Aela the Huntress, Bryling, Legate Rikke, Sorli the Builder, and Wolf-Queen Potema (various other characters)	
2012	Guild Wars 2	Female Norn PC	
2012	Darksiders II	Muria	
2012	Halo 4	Additional voices	
2014	Heroes of the Storm	Lady of Thorns	
2015	Starcraft II: Legacy of the Void	Rohana	
2015	Fallout 4	Desdemona, Mrs. Whitfield, Mistress of Mystery	
2016	Call of Duty: Infinite Warfare	Captain Ferran	
2016	World of Warcraft: Legion	Xal'atath, Blade of the Black Empire	
2018	World of Warcraft: Battle for Azeroth	(voice)	
2018	Fallout 76	Shannon Rivers, Miss Annie, Willie Mae	
2020	Legends of Runeterra	Tianna Crownguard	
2020	Fallout 76: Wastelanders	Miss Annie, Mistress of Mystery, Raiders	
2024	World of Warcraft: The War Within	Xal'atath, Blade of the Black Empire	
2026	World of Warcraft: Midnight	Xal'atath, Blade of the Black Empire	

== Awards and nominations ==
Year	Award	Category	Production	Result
1997	Saturn Award	Saturn Award for Best Actress on Television	Babylon 5	Nominated
1999	Saturn Award	Saturn Award for Best Actress on Television	Babylon 5	Nominated
2013	Behind the Voice Actors Awards	Best Vocal Ensemble in a Video Game	Darksiders II	Nominated
2016	Behind the Voice Actors Awards	Best Vocal Ensemble in a Video Game	StarCraft II: Legacy of the Void	Nominated

== Writing ==
- "Revenge is a Bitch to Swallow", short-story, published in Forbidden Love Issue 2: Wicked Women
- My Life with Geeks and Freaks, autobiography, published by Yard Dog Press
- Babylon Confidential: A Memoir of Love, Sex, and Addiction, autobiography
- Wolf's Empire: Gladiator, novel, co-written with Morgan Grant Buchanan, 2016
- Dark Legacies, comic book series by Scratch Comics, 2023

== Discography ==
- Claudia Squared with Claudia Cummings (1996)
- Trying to Forget by the Be Five (1998)
- "Taboo" single (1998, Zard)
- Once Upon a Time (2001, Zard)
