= Starhyke =

Television series

- Genre: Science fiction/Comedy
- Created by: Andrew Dymond
- Starring: Brad Gorton; Claudia Christian; Jeremy Bulloch; Rachel Grant; Suanne Braun; Wayne Pilbeam
- Country of origin: United Kingdom
- Original language: English
- No. of seasons: 1
- No. of episodes: 6

Production
- Producer: Jonathan George Brown
- Running time: 220 Mins

Original release
- Network: Showcase TV
- Release: 16 December – 30 December 2011

Starhyke is a British science fiction/comedy series filmed in 2004, released on home media in 2009 and broadcast on television in 2011.

Starhyke began production in October 2004 and starred Claudia Christian of Babylon 5 and Jeremy Bulloch from Star Wars. In 2007, the producers aimed to complete post-production, and in March 2008 it was announced that this process was now finished. However, a later post on the official site stated that post-production would be completed at the end of September 2008, and that there was a private screening of all six episodes in Bristol, UK in November 2008.

Only six episodes were originally made. An announcement on the official site reported that the producers were "getting nearer to finalising a deal and being able to announce which channel has been lucky enough to add Starhyke to their spring schedule". Producer, Jonathan Brown, said in March 2008 that Virgin 1 and Sky One had refused the series while Five Life, Bravo and Paramount Comedy were considering buying it. As reported on the official website props, costumes and posters from Starhyke were featured in episode 39 of the BBC drama Casualty, broadcast on 24 May 2008.

The series got its world premiere at a press, cast and crew screening at the Showcase Cinema De Lux in Cabot Circus, Bristol on 8 November 2008. The series was released on DVD on 30 November 2009.

The series world TV premiere was on the Sky satellite channel Showcase TV in December 2011.

== Scenario ==
The show begins in the year 3034 when humans have become emotionless drones bent on expansion by destroying any alien species they encounter. A ship commanded by Captain Belinda Blowhard (Christian) called the Nemesis sets out to destroy an alien race called the Reptids, who plan to unleash a biological weapon that would reawaken all human emotion. The Reptids' aim is to unleash the emotion of compassion, hoping that the emotion would stop humanity from its destructive endeavors.

The weapon is released on the crew of the Nemesis as the evading Reptid ship time travels back into the early 21st century; the Nemesis, the only ship with time-traveling capabilities, pursues the Reptids to the past — only to be overwhelmed by their own emotions. Now lost in the 21st century, they aim to tackle their emotions while trying to discover a cure and prevent the Reptids from succeeding.

== Episode list ==
1. Disordered
2. Lucy in the Sky
3. Kill Jill
4. Reboot
5. Plug And Play
6. Lock, Choc And Flying Hogs

== Cast and characters ==
=== Cast ===
- Claudia Christian as Captain Belinda Blowhard
- Brad Gorton as Commander Willian C. Cropper
- Fiona Reynard as Vilma Down
- Jeremy Bulloch as Doctor Yul Striker
- Mike Edmonds as Logan
- Rachel Grant as Wu Oof
- Rebecca Nichols as Nurse Sandy Beach
- Simon Lewis as Reg Duck
- Stephanie Jory as Sally Popyatopov
- Suanne Braun as Dotty-Ky
- Sue Witheridge as Daphne
- Wayne Pilbeam as Ensign Bull Ox
