= Rebecca Grant =

British actress

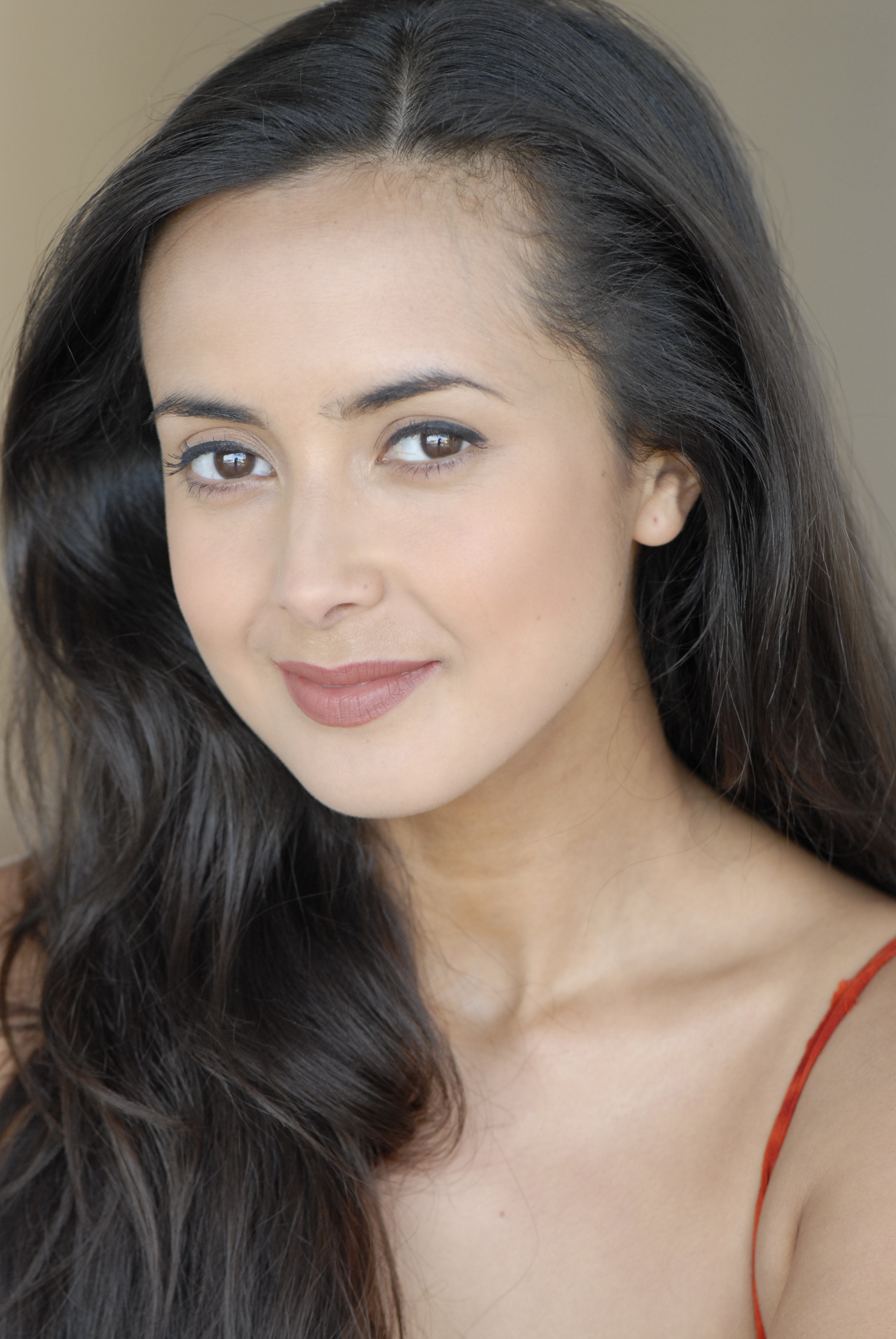
- Grant in 2010
- Born: Rebecca Marguerite Grant de Longueuil; 1982 (age 43–44); Nottingham, England
- Occupations: Actress; singer
- Years active: 2001–present
- Spouse: Ivan Pierson
- Children: 2
- Father: The 12th Baron de Longueuil
- Relatives: Rachel Grant (sister); Ernestine Bowes-Lyon (paternal great-grandmother)
- Website: rebeccagrant.co.uk

Rebecca Helena Grant de Longueuil (born ca. 1982) is an English actress and singer, known for her roles as Daisha Anderson on the BBC medical drama Holby City and Heather Irvine on the BBC soap opera Doctors.

Grant also has a singing career, and is known by the stage name Rebecca Swing. Through her father, Michael Grant, 12th Baron de Longueuil, Grant is a third cousin once removed of King Charles III of the United Kingdom.

== Acting career ==
Grant recently appeared in Stan Lee's Lucky Man for Sky 1 playing Lakshi Perrera opposite James Nesbitt and Amara Karan. She has taken regular television parts in BBC's Prisoners Wives, Midsomer Murders, ITV's Emmerdale playing Dr Stamford, Channel 4's Comedy Showcase playing Nila in Other People opposite Martin Freeman, and The Way We Live Now. She has also appeared on the big screen, in Kristina (an Independent Film in which she won best actress at The International Filmmaker Festival of World Cinema), Monsoon Tide (Laidback Films), Flipside and The Other Boleyn Girl. She also appeared in the 2001 film Sticks alongside Justina Machado. She played Yerma in Federico Garcia Lorca's Yerma directed by Emilio Barrachina which is gaining critical acclaim in Spain. Rebecca also recently won Best actress at The London Greek Film Festival for her portrayal of Stavroula in The 13TH by 1066 Productions.

Her stage credits include: "Dinner With Saddam" at The Menier Chocolate Factory written by Anthony Horowitz and performing opposite Steven Berkoff, Andrew Lloyd Webber's Bombay Dreams; One Flew Over the Cuckoo's Nest starring Christian Slater and directed by Terry Johnson; Tagore's Women by Kali Theatre; The House of Bernarda Alba; Who Is This Jesus?; Bloodwedding; Why Is John Lennon Wearing a Skirt?; Carmen; Roy Hudd's Aladdin; Mahabharata; Burlesque; Twelfth Night; and The Glass Cage.

In her most well known role, as Daisha Anderson, Grant plays a Filipina nurse, but Rebecca is of mixed British, Spanish and Filipino origin. She was also series regular Shaheen Wazir in BBC's second series of Prisoners' Wives and played semi-regular Heather Irvine in BBC One's Doctors.

In 2014, Grant played Princess Aouda in Jules Verne's Around the World in 80 Days written by House of Cards writer Laura Eason, receiving five star reviews up and down the country. She was then cast by Olivier award-winning director Terry Johnson in Seminar for Hampstead Theatre: a play that was previously on Broadway and written by NBC's Smash writer Theresa Rebeck. In 2015, Grant performed in a one-woman play at West Yorkshire Playhouse written by The Vagina Monologues writer Eve Ensler. In 2016 she appeared as Joanna Stockerton in the Midsomer Murders episode "Breaking the Chain. In 2019, Grant appeared in the Acorn TV series Queens of Mystery as Natasha Young. In October 2022, she returned to Doctors for one episode as Gemma Swinton.

Other acting roles include Showtrial, Some Like It Hot and Safe Space.

== Singing career ==
Grant has been singing throughout her acting career. At age 16, she was cast as Princess Jasmine at the Hall for Cornwall starring opposite Rick Wakeman and Richard Gauntlett singing Disney favorites such as "A Whole New World". In J.B. Priestley's The Glass Cage she sang a French ballad at the close of the play. In January 2018, she was preselected for a GOYA for her lead role in Emilio Ruiz Barrachina's film Yerma in which she also sang a melody as part of her role.

After her TV roles, she was scouted by The Jive Aces to play a number of UK jazz festivals, appearing with them at London's Ronnie Scott's Jazz Club, and at the Royal Albert Hall opening with Marilyn Monroe's "I Want To Be Loved By You". She also performed with them for the Queen's Jubilee celebrations at Buckingham Palace in 2012.

In the summer of 2018, Grant teamed up with US based producer Steve Scrivens to co-produce and star in a newly commissioned musical theatre production being written by BAFTA Award-winning songwriter Keith Tutt, which was slated to tour the UK in 2020. Under the management of Scrivens she is preparing for a UK music and dance show under her musical stage name Rebecca Swing, which will feature music of the 1920/30's swing and jazz period in a 21st century electro swing style. She was booked to star in a show produced by multi-award-winning Israeli composer and musical producer Tomer Adaddi in Boca Raton, Florida in February and March 2019.

Grant is developing her own music with musician and composer Stephen Large and music producer Andrew Jones and has penned new songs for the Laidback Films production of Monsoon Tide, writing the theme song "Wild Wild Woman" and "Tears out to Dry" with "Young Busker of the Year" for 2009/10, Jamie West.

== Personal life ==
Grant's father is Michael Grant, 12th Baron de Longueuil. Her mother Isabel moved from the Philippines to live in Nottingham, England, where Grant grew up. Grant has two older sisters and a half-brother, and her paternal great-grandmother, Ernestine Bowes-Lyon, was a first cousin of Queen Elizabeth the Queen Mother. She is married to Ivan Pierson and they have two children.
