= Hexed (1993 film) =

1993 film by Alan Spencer

- Theatrical release poster
- Directed by: Alan Spencer
- Written by: Alan Spencer
- Produced by: Louis G. Friedman; Marc S. Fischer
- Starring: Arye Gross; Claudia Christian; Adrienne Shelly; Norman Fell
- Cinematography: James Chressanthis
- Edited by: Debra McDermott
- Music by: Lance Rubin
- Distributed by: Columbia Pictures
- Release date: January 22, 1993
- Running time: 93 minutes
- Country: United States
- Language: English
- Budget: $700,000
- Box office: $2.7 million

Hexed is a 1993 American black romantic comedy film starring Arye Gross, Claudia Christian, Adrienne Shelly, and R. Lee Ermey, and written and directed by Alan Spencer. The film centers on a nebbish hotel clerk who is also a pathological liar that falls in love with a supermodel, unaware that she is a psychotic murderer and escaped mental patient. The movie was filmed in Dallas and Fort Worth. The film drew mixed reviews, but has since acquired a cult following.

== Plot ==
Matt Welsh, a socially awkward hotel clerk and a pathological liar, falls in love with a supermodel who happens to be visiting the hotel in which he works, unaware that she is also a pathological liar and a psychotic murderer.

== Cast ==
- Arye Gross as Matthew "Matt" Welsh
- Claudia Christian as Helen "Hexina" Spears
- Adrienne Shelly as Gloria O'Connor
- R. Lee Ermey as Det. Ferguson
- Ray Baker as Victor Thummell
- Michael E. Knight as Simon Littlefield
- Robin Curtis as Rebecca
- Norman Fell as Herschel Levine

== Development ==
Sony Pictures Entertainment made an overall deal with Alan Spencer in 1991 with an emphasis on television, but Spencer wanted to try his hand at features. As part of the deal, Sony acquired a screenplay penned by Spencer from Weintraub Entertainment Group entitled Shattered Nerves. Spencer was attached to direct.

== Reception ==
On the review aggregator website Rotten Tomatoes, 9% of 11 critics' reviews are positive. Marketed as a parody, Hexed drew harsh reviews, but also occasional positive notices. Owen Gleiberman of Entertainment Weekly gave it a grade of D−, writing it "starts out as the umpteenth Risky Business knockoff and then degenerates into a haphazard 'spoof' of Basic Instinct". In contrast, Jeff Mennel of The Hollywood Reporter wrote: "Hexed is a little bit Airplane! and a touch of High Anxiety, but it's all Alan Spencer. Spencer has concocted a fun, offbeat, uneven murder comedy that is stop-and-go in its delivery ... Hexed certainly has its share of narrative flaws, but they're worth putting up with for the wealth of laughter." Ted Baehr's MovieGuide said, "Hexed is an occasionally funny parody of erotic thrillers (Basic Instinct, 9½ Weeks, and Fatal Attraction) that goes too far."
