= Jasses =

- Commune
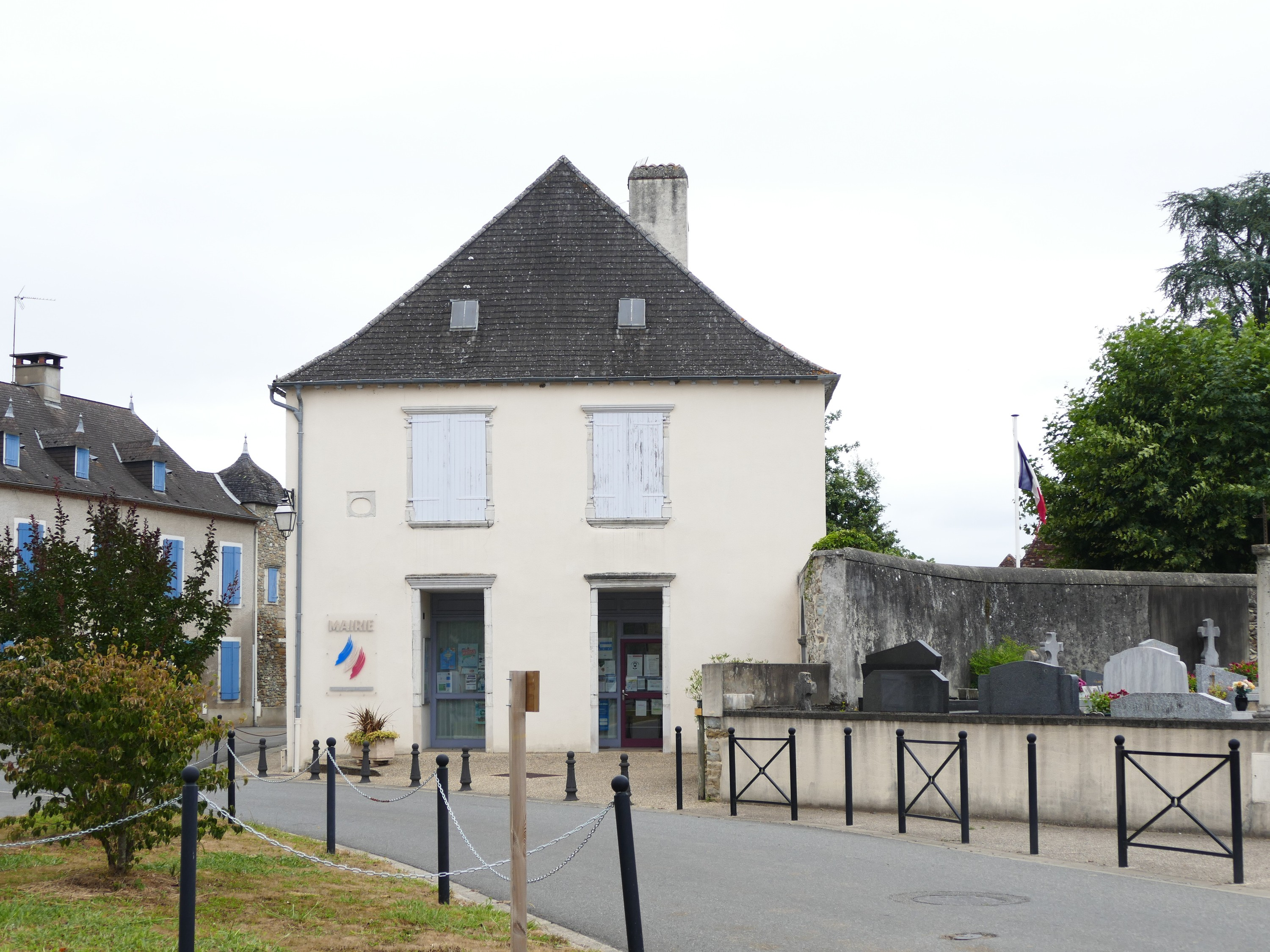
- Jasses Town hall
- Location of Jasses
- Location within France Location within Nouvelle-Aquitaine
- Coordinates: 43°18′41″N 0°44′46″W
- Country: France
- Region: Nouvelle-Aquitaine
- Department: Pyrénées-Atlantiques
- Arrondissement: Oloron-Sainte-Marie
- Canton: Le Cœur de Béarn
- Intercommunality: Béarn des Gaves

Government
  - Mayor (2020–2026): Catherine Bonnefon
- Area^{1}: 5.22 km^{2} (2.02 sq mi)
- Elevation: 161 m (528 ft)
- Highest elevation: 271 m (889 ft)
- Lowest elevation: 119 m (390 ft)
- Population (2023): 142
  - Density: 27.2/km^{2} (70.5/sq mi)
- Time zone: UTC+01:00 (CET)
  - Summer (DST): UTC+02:00 (CEST)
- INSEE/Postal code: 64281 /64190
- ^{1} French Land Register data, which excludes lakes, ponds, glaciers > 1 km^{2} (0.386 sq mi or 247 acres) and river estuaries.

Jasses (French pronunciation: [ʒas]; Occitan: Jaces) is a commune in the Pyrénées-Atlantiques department in south-western France.

== Geography ==
=== Location ===
Jasses sits east of the Gave d'Oloron river. On the opposite side of the river is Sus.

== See also ==
- Communes of the Pyrénées-Atlantiques department
