= Charles le Moyne de Longueuil, Baron de Longueuil =

Canadian politician

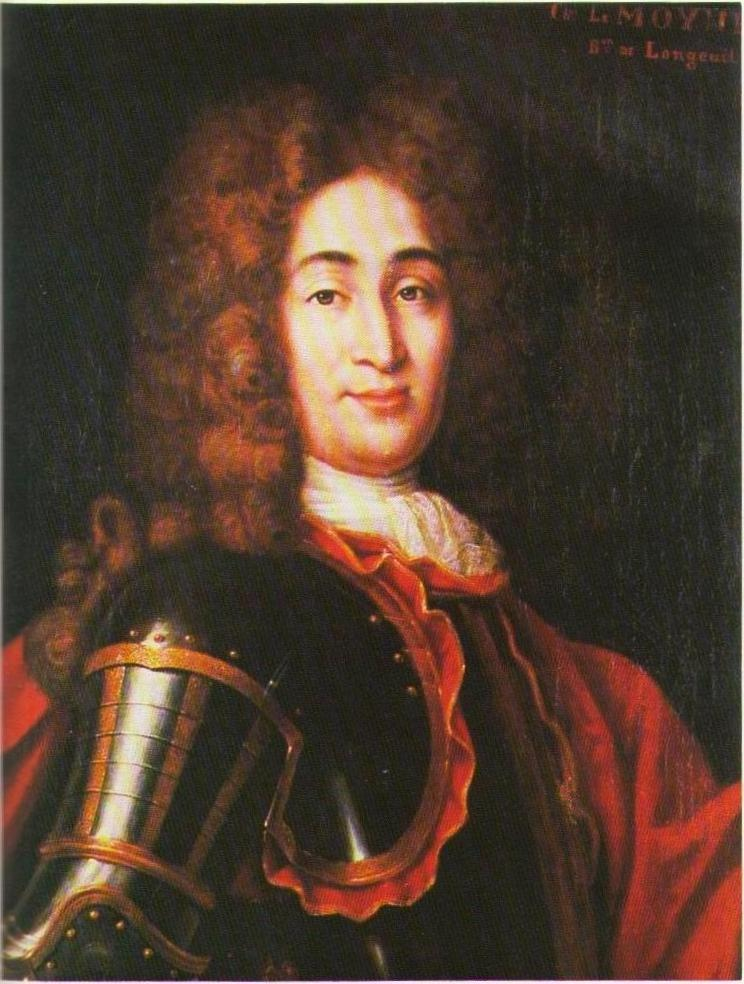
Charles Le Moyne

Charles (II) le Moyne de Longueuil, Baron de Longueuil (French pronunciation: [ʃaʁl lə mwan də lɔ̃ɡœj]; December 10, 1656 – June 7, 1729) was the first native-born Canadian to be made Baron in New France.

Charles le Moyne de Longueuil was the eldest son of Charles le Moyne de Longueuil et de Châteauguay and spent his childhood in France as a page to one of Governor Frontenac's relatives. He was a military officer and governor of Trois-Rivières. He was appointed governor of Montreal in 1724.

When the Governor General of New France, Vaudreuil died in 1725, Longueuil was made responsible for the general administration of New France, until a new governor could be appointed. He was disappointed that the position was not given to him, being a natural progression from the governing of Trois-Rivieres. and later of Montreal, and, for a time, acting administrator of New France.

During his life he owned 10 slaves.

== See also ==
- Canadian Hereditary Peers

French nobility
Preceded by New Creation	Baron de Longueuil; 1700-1729	Succeeded by Charles III Le Moyne
