= Rachel Grant =

Filipino actress

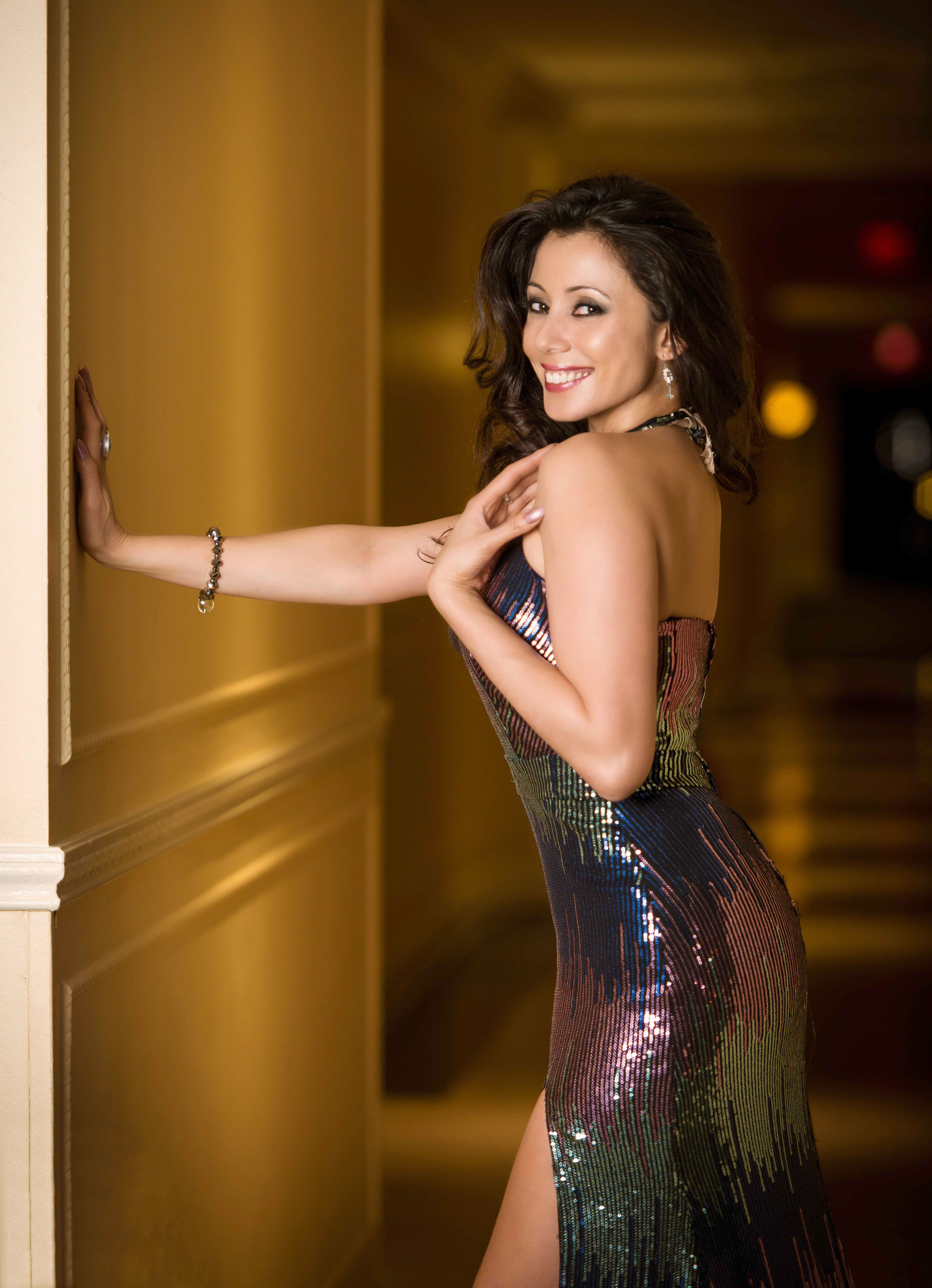
- Grant in 2014
- Born: Rachel Louise Grant de Longueuil; 25 September 1977 (age 48); Parañaque, Philippines
- Occupation: Actress
- Years active: 1998–present
- Height: 5 ft 8 in (1.73m)
- Spouse: Stephen Hersh (m. 2019)
- Parents: The 12th Baron de Longueuil (father); Isabel Padua (mother)
- Relatives: Rebecca Grant (sister)

Rachel Louise Grant de Longueuil (born 25 September 1977) is a British actress.

== Early life ==
Grant was born on the island of Luzon in the Philippines to Michael Grant, 12th Baron de Longueuil, and Isabel Padua; her family moved to the United Kingdom when she was a baby, and she was raised in Nottingham, England. She is of Scottish, French-Canadian and Filipino descent. She is related to the British royal family through her grandfather, the 11th Baron of Longueuil, who was a second cousin to Queen Elizabeth II through the Bowes-Lyon family. That makes her a fourth cousin to Princes William and Harry.

== Acting career ==
Grant played Peaceful Fountains of Desire in the 2002 James Bond film Die Another Day. One of her first TV roles was on SyFy as Nina, the hostess of horror show Sci-fright. She was Professor Myang-Li in the Sky One series Brainiac: Science Abuse from 2003-2007. She has starred in theatre and in TV shows including Emmerdale, Murder in Suburbia, Blue Murder and Casualty. She also appeared in the films Until Death, The Purifiers and more recently, in the sci-fi comedy Snatchers.

== Sexual assault allegation ==
On 15 January 2018, Grant publicly made a sexual assault allegation against actor/producer Steven Seagal, stating an incident took place in 2002, during pre-production on his film Out for a Kill, and that she lost her job on the film after the incident. Seagal, who had been accused by other actresses of sexual assault in the past, denied these allegations.

== Personal life ==
In November 2019, Grant married Stephen Hersh in Israel.

== Filmography ==
=== Television ===
- Emmerdale as Tanya (1998)
- Masters of Combat as Kali (2001)
- Sci-fright as Nina (2001)
- Brainiac: Science Abuse as Professor Myang-Li (2003-2007)
- Blue Murder as DC Jenny Chen (2003)
- Zero to Hero as Nemesis (2004)
- Casualty as Marie Webster (2004)
- Starhyke as Wu Oof (2006)
- Murder in Suburbia as Sandra Foy (2004)
- Miss Earth 2010 as a main judge (2010)
- Tour Group as Tour Guide (2016)

=== Film ===
- Die Another Day as "Peaceful Fountains Of Desire" (2002)
- The Purifiers as Li (2004)
- Brotherhood of Blood as Jill (2006)
- Until Death as Maria Ronson (2007)
- The Tournament as Lina Sofia (2009)
- The African Game as Bian (2010)
- Red Princess Blues (film) as Princess (2011)
- Snatchers (film) as Edie (2017)
