= The Purifiers =

2004 film

The Purifiers is a 2004 action film directed by Richard Jobson, and starring Dominic Monaghan. It was produced by Chris Atkins.

== Cast ==
- Kevin McKidd as Moses
- Gordon Alexander as John
- Rachel Grant as Li
- Dominic Monaghan as Sol
- Amber Sainsbury as Frances
- Robyn Kerr as Sam
- Jamie Hayden as Raz
