= Longueil, Seine-Maritime =

Longueil
- Commune
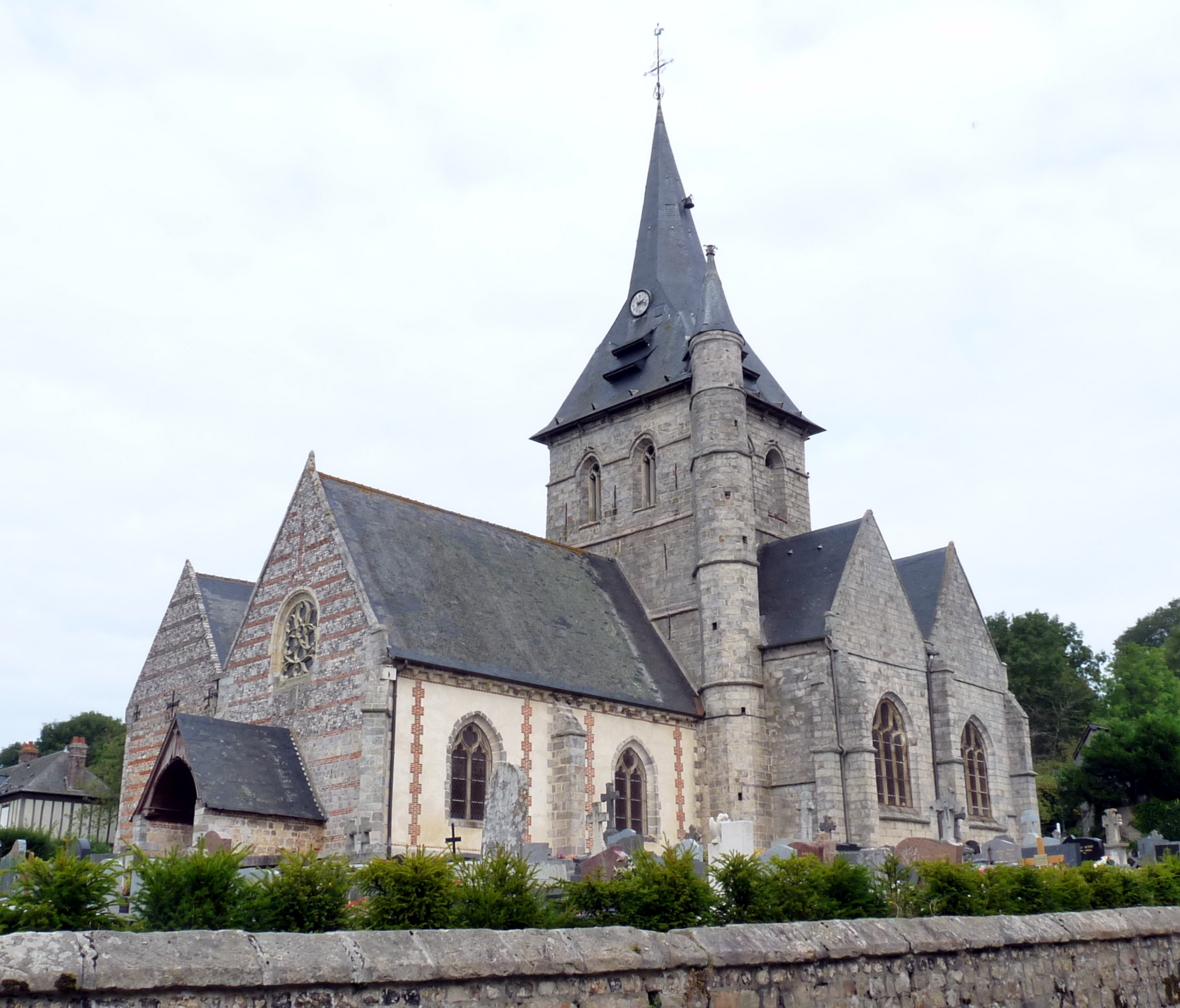
- Saint-Pierre Church

- Coat of arms
- Location of Longueil
- Location within France Location within Normandy
- Coordinates: 49°53′01″N 0°56′59″E
- Country: France
- Region: Normandy
- Department: Seine-Maritime
- Arrondissement: Dieppe
- Canton: Dieppe-1
- Intercommunality: CC Terroir de Caux

Government
  - Mayor (2020–2026): Didier Ledrait
- Area^{1}: 11.73 km^{2} (4.53 sq mi)
- Elevation: 7 m (23 ft)
- Highest elevation: 69 m (226 ft)
- Lowest elevation: 1 m (3.3 ft)
- Population (2023): 503
  - Density: 42.9/km^{2} (111/sq mi)
- Time zone: UTC+01:00 (CET)
  - Summer (DST): UTC+02:00 (CEST)
- INSEE/Postal code: 76395 /76860
- ^{1} French Land Register data, which excludes lakes, ponds, glaciers > 1 km^{2} (0.386 sq mi or 247 acres) and river estuaries.

Longueil (French pronunciation: [lɔ̃ɡœj]) is a commune in the Seine-Maritime department in the Normandy region in northern France.

== Geography ==
A farming village situated by the banks of the river Saâne in the Pays de Caux, some 9 miles (14 km) southwest of Dieppe on the D 27 and the D 925 at its junction with the D 127 road.

== Coat of arms ==
Arms of Longueil	The arms of Longueil are blazoned : tierced per fess 1: Or, 2 roses gules; 2: Gules, a crescent between 2 mullets argent; 3: Azure, a rose argent.

== Population ==
Historical population
Year	Pop.	±% p.a.
1968	620	—
1975	618	−0.05%
1982	579	−0.93%
1990	516	−1.43%
1999	513	−0.06%
2007	550	+0.87%
2012	577	+0.96%
2017	561	−0.56%
2023	503	−1.80%
Source: INSEE

== Places of interest ==
- The church of Saint-Pierre, dating from the 13th and 16th century.
- Ruins of an 11th and 12th century castle.

== See also ==
- Communes of the Seine-Maritime department
- Longueuil, Quebec
