= Charles Colmore Grant, 7th Baron de Longueuil =

English nobleman (1844–1898)

Charles Colmore Grant, 7th Baron de Longueuil was an English nobleman of the peerage of France. He the son of Charles James Irwin Grant, 6th Baron de Longueuil and Harriet Cregoe-Colmore. He was born on 13 April 1844 at Cheltenham, Gloucestershire, England. In 1878, he married Mary Wayne, daughter of Thomas Wayne. In 1880, he claimed a royal recognition of his right to the barony of Longueuil. By the treaty of Quebec the sovereignty of Canada passed from the Kings of France to the Kings of Great Britain but with the reservation that all rights and privileges "of what kind soever" should be reserved and secured to all individuals of French descent to which they had been entitled under the previous regime. Queen Victoria was graciously pleased to recognise the claim of Charles Colmore Grant to the title of Baron de Longueuil. He died on 13 December 1898 at age 54 at New York City. He was without issue and his half-brother Reginald Charles succeeded him.

French nobility recognized by the Crown in right of Canada
Preceded by Charles James Irwin Grant	Baron de Longueuil; 1879–1898	Succeeded by Reginald Charles Grant
