= Charles William Grant, 5th Baron de Longueuil =

Charles William Grant, 5th Baron de Longueuil was an Anglo-Canadian soldier and peer, born in 1782. He was the son of British Army Captain David Alexander Grant, and Marie-Charles-Joseph Le Moyne, 4th Baroness de Longueuil. He served during the War of 1812 as Lieutenant Colonel of the Boucherville militia battalion and as a staff officer. He was taken prisoner by the Americans on 8 December 1813, and was held hostage in Worcester, Massachusetts. He married Caroline Coffin, daughter of General John Coffin and Anne Mathews, on 21 May 1814. He became a member of the Legislative Council of Lower Canada. He succeeded to the title of Baron de Longueuil on 17 January 1841. He died on 5 July 1848 at his residence of Alwington House in Kingston.

== Ancestry ==
Ancestors of Charles William Grant, 5th Baron de Longueuil

16. John Grant
8. William Grant
17. Helen Forbes
4. David Grant
18. David Tyrie
9. Jean Tyrie
19. Elizabeth Gordon
2. David Alexander Grant
10. James Richardson
5. Elizabeth Richardson
1. Charles William Grant, 5th Baron de Longueuil
24. Charles Le Moyne, 1st Baron de Longueuil
12. Charles Le Moyne, 2nd Baron de Longueuil
25. Claude-Elisabeth Souart
6. Charles-Jacques Le Moyne, 3rd Baron de Longueuil
26. Louis-Joseph-Hyacinthe LeGoues
13. Catherine-Charlotte LeGoues
27. Marguerite Legardeur
3. Marie-Charles Le Moyne, 4th Baroness de Longueuil
28. Joseph Fleury
14. Joseph Fleury
29. Claire Jolliet
7. Marie-Anne Catherine Fleury
30. Étienne Véron
15. Catherine Véron
31. Catherine Picard

French nobility
Preceded by Marie-Charles-Joseph Le Moyne	Baron de Longueuil; 1841–1848	Succeeded by Charles James Irwin Grant
