= Charles James Irwin Grant, 6th Baron de Longueuil =

Charles James Irwin Grant, 6th Baron de Longueuil, was an Anglo-Canadian nobleman. He was born in Montreal, Lower Canada on 1 April 1815, and was the only male issue of Charles William Grant, 5th Baron de Longueuil and Lady Caroline Coffin. He served in the 79th Regiment as a lieutenant for a while. He later married Henriet Colmore, from whom he fathered two sons (Alexander Frederick, died age 2 and Charles Colmore) as well as a daughter. His wife Henriet died in 1847 and he remarried in Charleston, South Carolina on 18 January 1849 to Anne Trapman, second daughter of Louis Trapman, a consul. He had many children from this union including Reginald Charles and John Charles Moore. He died on 26 February 1879 at age 63.

== Ancestry ==
Ancestors of Charles James Irwin Grant, 6th Baron de Longueuil

16. William Grant
8. David Grant
17. Jean Tyrie
4. David Alexander Grant
18. James Richardson
9. Elizabeth Richardson
2. Charles William Grant, 5th Baron de Longueuil
20. Charles Le Moyne, 2nd Baron de Longueuil
10. Charles-Jacques Le Moyne, 3rd Baron de Longueuil
21. Catherine-Charlotte LeGoues
5. Marie-Charles Le Moyne, 4th Baroness de Longueuil
22. Joseph Fleury
11. Marie-Anne Catherine Fleury
23. Catherine Véron
1. Charles James Irwin Grant, 6th Baron de Longueuil
24. William Coffin
12. Nathaniel Coffin
25. Anne Holmes
6. John Coffin
26. Henry Barnes
13. Elizabeth Barnes
3. Caroline Coffin
14. William Matthews
7. Anne Matthews
15. Anne Radcliffe Wilson

French nobility
| Preceded by Charles William Grant | Baron de Longueuil; 1848–1879 | Succeeded by Charles Colmore |
