= Charles III Le Moyne =

Canadian politician

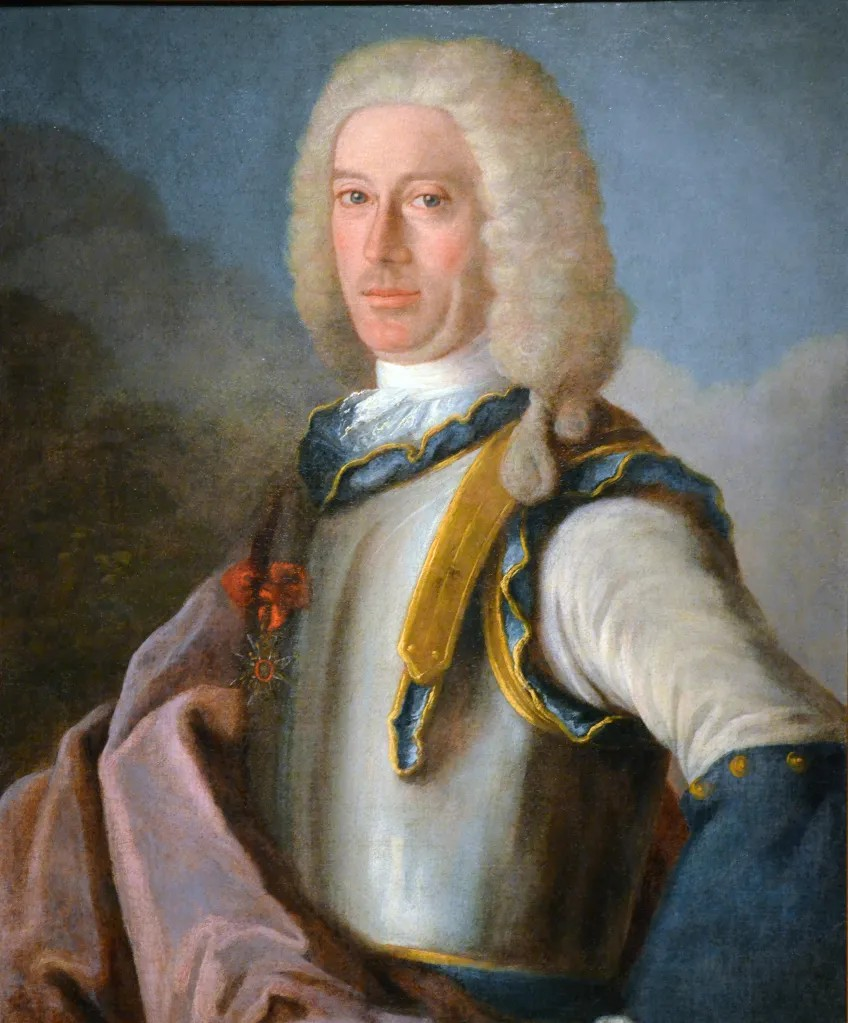
Charles le Moyne, Second Baron de Longueuil

Charles III Le Moyne (18 October 1687 – 17 January 1755) was the second baron de Longueuil. He succeeded his father Charles to the title in 1729. He became Governor of Montreal, and acting administrator of New France for a few months in 1752 before being replaced by the Marquis de Menneville.

== Biography ==
Charles III Le Moyne was the son of Charles, Baron de Longueiul, who had been the interim General Administrator for New France. His father named him Commandant of Fort Niagara on April 28, 1726. In June 1733, Charles III was made a Major of the military troops of the Government of Montreal, In 1739, the Governor-General of New France, the Marquis de Beauharnois, sent him to Louisiana in order to help the Governor of Louisiana Jean-Baptiste Le Moyne de Bienville against the native Chicachas. He returned to Montreal in 1740 and a few years later, on May 23, 1749, Louis XV named him Governor of Montreal. After the death of the Governor of New France, the Marquis de la Jonquière, the Intendant of New France François Bigot appointed him the interim Administrator of New France; but he did not retain the position for long, as the King had already appointed the marquis de Menneville prior to the death of the Marquis de la Jonquière. In August 1752, he returned to the governorship of Montreal.

During his life he owned seven slaves.

== See also ==
- Baron de Longueuil

=== Notes and references ===
French nobility
Preceded by Charles le Moyne de Longueuil, Baron de Longueuil	Baron de Longueuil; 1729-1755	Succeeded by Charles-Jacques Le Moyne
