= Baron de Longueuil =

Barony of Canada

Barony of Longueuil
- Creation date: 1700
- Created by: King Louis XIV
- Peerage: Peerage of Canada; Peerage of France
- First holder: Charles le Moyne de Longueuil, 1st Baron de Longueuil
- Present holder: Michael Grant, 12th Baron de Longueuil
- Heir apparent: David Grant de Longueuil
- Remainder to: 1st Baron's heirs general of the body
- Former seat: Alwington House

Baron de Longueuil (French pronunciation: [baʁɔ̃ d(ə) lɔ̃ɡœj]) is a title in the Peerage of Canada . It was created by King Louis XIV, King of France, in 1700 for Charles le Moyne de Longueuil, a Norman military officer. Its continuing recognition by the Monarchy of Canada and the United Kingdom, since the cession of Canada by France to Britain, is based on the Treaty of Paris (1763), which reserved to those of French descent all rights which they had enjoyed before the cession.

== History ==
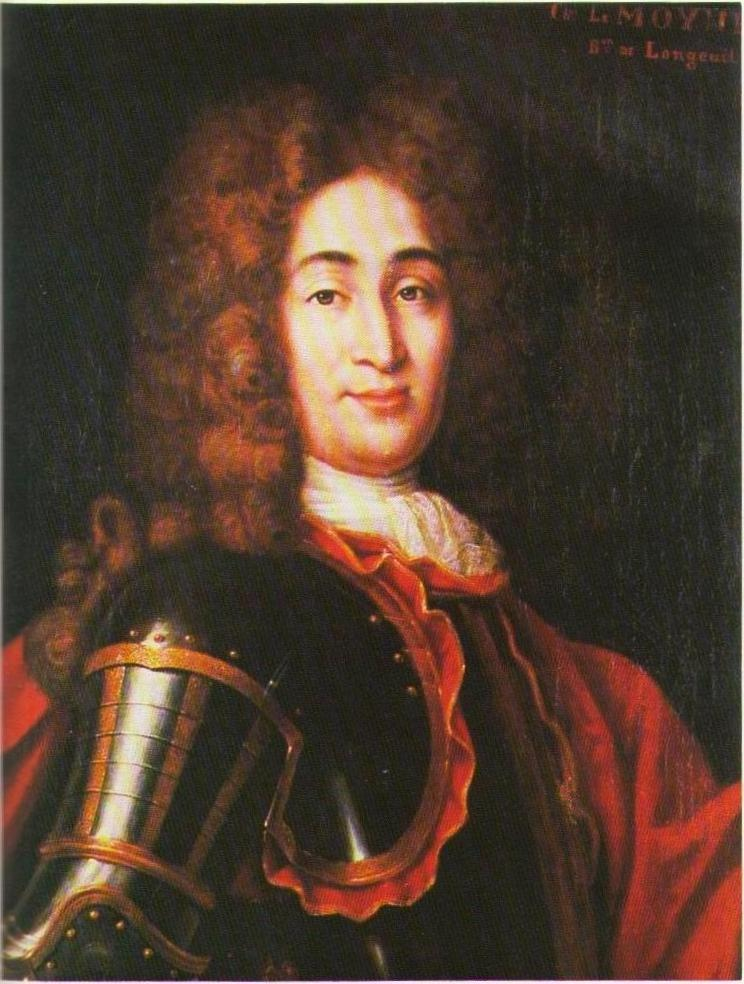
Charles le Moyne de Longueuil

The Seigneury of Longueuil was first granted in 1657 to Charles le Moyne de Longueuil et de Châteauguay. Le Moyne named the granted territory after his mother's hometown of Longueil, located in Normandy, France.

On 26 January 1700, in recognition of Le Moyne's service to the French Crown, King Louis XIV of France elevated the seigneury to the rank of barony by letters patent issued at Versailles, creating the Barony of Longueuil with hereditary rights to Le Moyne, his children, and lawful descendants.

By 1710, the barony had expanded significantly, stretching from the Saint Lawrence River to the Richelieu River, and southward along the river's west bank to the Seigneury of DeLéry. Charles le Moyne died in 1729, and the title passed to his son, Charles Le Moyne, 2nd Baron de Longueuil.

The third Baron, Charles-Jacques Le Moyne, was reported missing in action following the Battle of Lake George during the Seven Years' War. His wife, Marie-Anne-Catherine Fleury Deschambault, did not acknowledge his death until 1759 and gave birth to twin daughters shortly after the battle. She later married William Grant, son of the Laird of Blairfindy in Moray, Scotland, in 1770.

The barony was inherited by her surviving daughter, Marie-Charles-Joseph Le Moyne de Longueuil. In 1781, she married Captain David Alexander Grant of the British 84th Regiment, a nephew of William Grant. Their eldest son succeeded as the fifth Baron de Longueuil in 1841.

At its height, the barony encompassed approximately 150 square miles (390 km^{2}). As the population of the region grew, much of the land was sold into freehold. Following the abolition of the seigneurial system in 1854, the unsold portions of the estate became entailed. Seigneurial revenues from the remaining lands continued until 1969.

After the British conquest of New France, the Le Moyne family maintained that, under the terms of capitulation and British assurances regarding property rights, the baronial title should be recognised by the Crown. A formal petition for recognition was submitted to Queen Victoria in 1880. The claim was reviewed by law officers of the Crown, who found it valid. Consequently, by royal proclamation, Queen Victoria recognised Charles Colmore Grant as the seventh Baron de Longueuil and affirmed that the title was originally conferred by King Louis XIV in 1700.

On 10 May 2004, the city of Longueuil was granted a coat of arms by the Canadian Heraldic Authority. The design was based on the arms originally granted to Charles Le Moyne by King Louis XIV in 1668. The presentation took place in the presence of the Lieutenant Governor of Quebec and Raymond Grant, 11th Baron de Longueuil.

In 2007, an uninhabited island in the Saint Lawrence River — formerly known as Île Verte — was renamed Îlot de la Baronnie in honour of the baronial legacy. As of today, the title is held by Michael Grant, 12th Baron de Longueuil, a cognatic descendant of the first Baron.

== Barons de Longueuil (1700) ==
- Charles II le Moyne, 1st Baron de Longueuil (1700–1729)
- Charles III le Moyne, 2nd Baron de Longueuil (1729–1755)
- Charles-Jacques le Moyne, 3rd Baron de Longueuil (1755–1755)
- Marie-Charles le Moyne, 4th Baroness de Longueuil (1755–1841)
- Charles William Grant, 5th Baron de Longueuil (1841–1848)
- Charles James Irwin Grant, 6th Baron de Longueuil (1848–1879)
- Charles Colmore Grant, 7th Baron de Longueuil (1879–1898)
- Reginald Charles Grant, 8th Baron de Longueuil (1898–1931)
- John Charles Moore Grant, 9th Baron de Longueuil (1931–1938)
- Ronald Charles Grant, 10th Baron de Longueuil (1938–1959)
- Raymond Grant, 11th Baron de Longueuil (1959–2004)
- Michael Grant, 12th Baron de Longueuil (2004–present)

The heir apparent is the present holder's son, David Grant de Longueuil (born 1984).

== See also ==
- Canadian Hereditary Peers
- Canadian titles debate
