= John Coffin (judge) =

Canadian politician

John Coffin (1756 – May 12, 1838) was an army officer, merchant, judge, slave owner and political figure in New Brunswick. He represented King's County in the Legislative Assembly of New Brunswick from 1785 to 1816.

Born in Boston, he was the son of Nathaniel Coffin and Elizabeth Barnes. He was a loyalist who entered the British Army and fought at the Battle of Bunker Hill. He was a major in the Orange Rangers in 1777, serving in New Jersey and New York, and later transferred to the New York Volunteers, which saw action in Georgia and South Carolina. In 1781, he married Ann Mathews. Coffin became a major in the King's American Regiment in 1782. In 1783, he was placed on half pay and brought his family to what is now New Brunswick.

Coffin acquired a large estate from Beamsley Perkins Glasier, where he built a grist mill and a sawmill. He also sold fish, lumber and rum. Coffin was named a justice of the peace and a judge in the Inferior Court of Common Pleas. In 1812, he was named to the New Brunswick Council. Coffin raised the New Brunswick Fencibles during the War of 1812. In 1819, he was given the rank of full general. In 1817, Coffin moved to England but he retained his position on the New Brunswick Council until 1828. He later returned to New Brunswick and died in Westfield Parish.

His brother Isaac was an Admiral in the British Navy and a prominent land owner in Quebec.

General John Coffin was buried along with his son Nathaniel in St. Peter's Cemetery at Woodman's Point where the Nerapis meets the Saint John River. Their markers, under a huge Oak tree simply read General Coffin age 87, Nath Coffin age 15.
