= Raymond Schultz (bishop) =

Canadian bishop

Raymond L. Schultz B.A. M.Div. is a former National Bishop of the Evangelical Lutheran Church in Canada. He announced that he would step down after the National Convention elects his successor.

The Rev. Canon Susan Johnson, formerly assistant to the Bishop of the Eastern Synod, was elected to succeed him as National Bishop on June 22, 2007. Bishop Schultz continued in office until September 1, 2007.

He was elected to the position of National Bishop in 2001, replacing outgoing Bishop Telmor Sartison in a ceremony attended by both Lutheran and Anglican clergy .

Schultz served as bishop of the British Columbia synod from 1998 to 2001. He studied for his Bachelor of Arts at the University of Saskatchewan, and obtained his Master of Divinity from the Lutheran Theological Seminary, doing post-graduate work at the Vancouver School of Theology.
