= Navarrenx =

Navarrenx Navarrencs (Occitan) Nabarrenkoxe (Basque)
- Commune
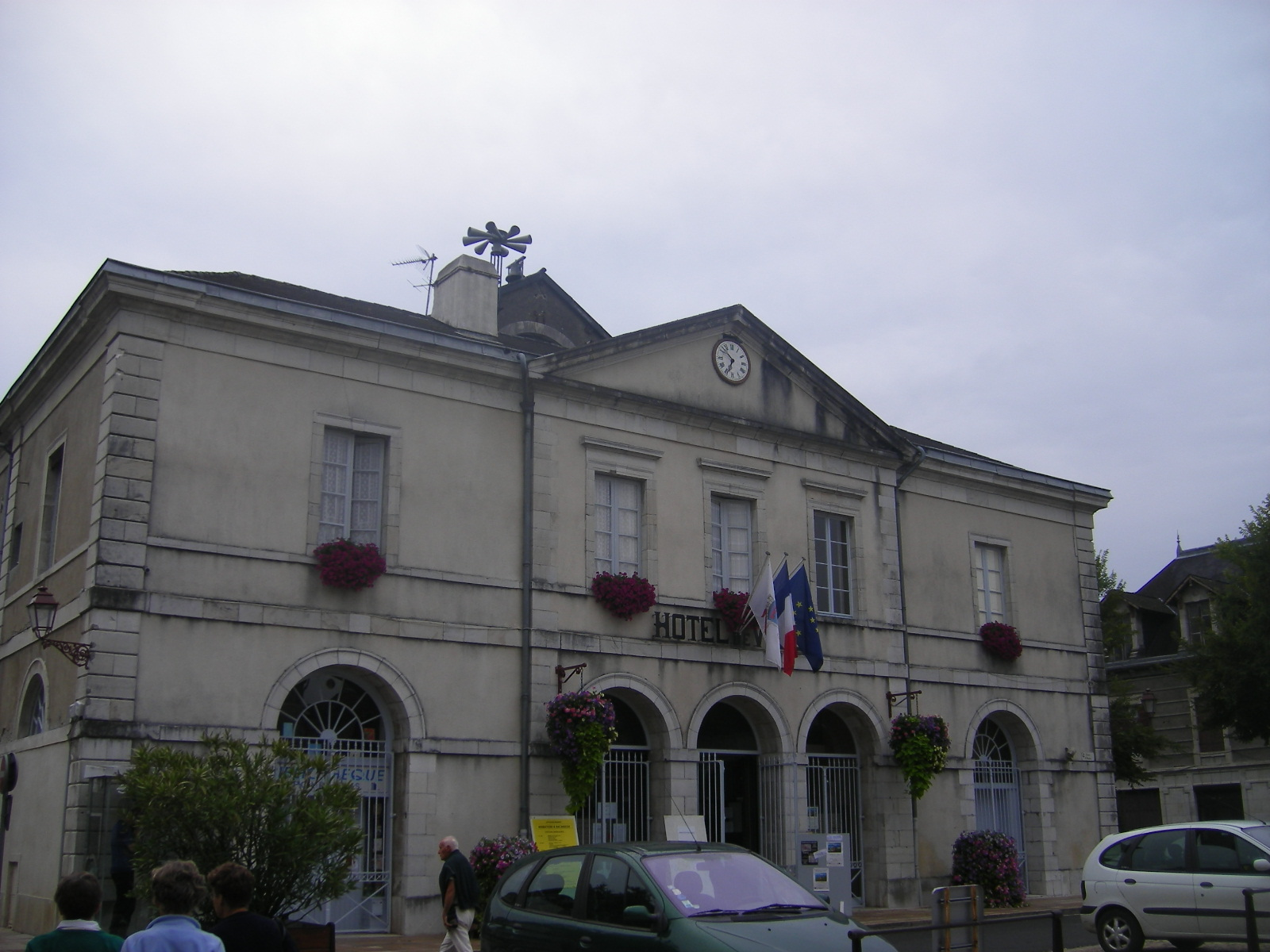
- The town hall of Navarrenx

- Coat of arms
- Location of Navarrenx
- Location within France Location within Nouvelle-Aquitaine
- Coordinates: 43°19′22″N 0°45′29″W
- Country: France
- Region: Nouvelle-Aquitaine
- Department: Pyrénées-Atlantiques
- Arrondissement: Oloron-Sainte-Marie
- Canton: Le Cœur de Béarn
- Intercommunality: Béarn des Gaves

Government
  - Mayor (2020–2026): Nadine Barthe
- Area^{1}: 6.21 km^{2} (2.40 sq mi)
- Elevation: 125 m (410 ft)
- Highest elevation: 269 m (883 ft)
- Lowest elevation: 118 m (387 ft)
- Population (2023): 1,042
  - Density: 168/km^{2} (435/sq mi)
- Demonym: Navarrais·e (FR)
- Time zone: UTC+01:00 (CET)
  - Summer (DST): UTC+02:00 (CEST)
- INSEE/Postal code: 64416 /64190
- ^{1} French Land Register data, which excludes lakes, ponds, glaciers > 1 km^{2} (0.386 sq mi or 247 acres) and river estuaries.

Navarrenx (French pronunciation: [navaʁɛ̃ks]; Occitan: Navarrencs [naβaˈreŋts]; Basque: Nabarrengose, Zuberoan: Nabarrenkoxe) is a town and commune in the French department of Pyrénées-Atlantiques and the region of Nouvelle-Aquitaine. The demonym is Navarre. Since 2014, the town has been in the association Les Plus Beaux Villages de France. It is located in the cultural area of Béarn.

== Etymology ==
The name Navarrenx comes from sponda Navarrensi, meaning the "bedstead of Navarre" or "House of the Navarreses". According to linguist Michel Grosclaude it may have meant the edge of the Navarre. There may be kinship between the Basque radical Navarre and Navarrenx, but Basque philologists hesitate to link the several etymologies.

The first written mention of the name of the city lies in a charter of 1078. Navarrenx (Navarrensis) is mentioned five times.

== History ==
The earliest history of the site dates to the first century. Navarrenx is reported in a cartulary of the eleventh century under the name of Sponda-Navarrensis.

There was a long-standing agreement between Centulle V, Viscount of Béarn, and Oloron and his vassal Raymond-William, Viscount of Soule. The latter came to Navarrenx to repair the harm done to the Béarnais by the Souletins. He could make it right and do justice on oath, either by paying a fine or by ordeal. In this case, the text says that the duel would happen, not on the bank of the Gave the side of the Soule, but the shore-side of Navarrenx (Belluno Fiet Quod non in ripa Soulensi, sed in Sponda Navarrensis). The place is still known today as the camp batalha.

In 1188, Gaston VI called for a charter of a "Bridge of Navarrenx", a stone bridge, and the establishment of a market, and a perimeter "sauveté" (a sauveté is, in the south of France in the Middle Ages, an area of extraterritoriality, protected by the Catholic Church and in which man's law no longer applies). This space of freedom, in the scope of which it was forbidden to pursue the fugitives, was marked by boundaries, with "hospitau" and chapel. The bridge was finally built in 1289. It facilitates access to Pyrenean passes and Navarra, particularly for pilgrims on the Way of Saint Jacques de Compostela. Indeed, the village is an important step on the road to Puy crossroads leading to the Somport pass to the east and to the west of Roncesvalles.

The Viscount of Béarn built a magnificent castle Casterasse ("fortress") on the hill to the west, at the confluence of the rivers Gave d'Oloron and Arroder. In 1523, the Castilians led by Philibert of Chalon, Prince of Orange, seized the city and destroyed the Casterasse. Henry II of Albret, the king of Navarre, decided to reinforce defences on the right bank of the mountain stream of Oloron. From 1538 to 1546, fortification works were carried out under the direction of Béarn master builders François Girard and Arnaud de Mirassor, as per the design of Italian architectural engineer Fabricio Siciliano. Navarrenx was thus transformed into a modern fortified town "Italian-style", based on the citadel of Lucca in Tuscany. Later, a powder magazine would be built that would store up to 25,000 lb (11,000 kg) of gunpowder: a square-shaped construction little more than 9 m (30 ft) long, it was originally surrounded by a wall, part of which was visible aboveground. While this wall has since disappeared, the thickness of this wall (1.4 m (4 ft 7 in)) and the lowness of the building (6 m (20 ft)) prevented it from receiving direct hits from enemy forces.

The fortifications were tried and tested during religious wars under the reign of Jeanne of Albret, when the garrison under the command of the Baron of Arros successfully resisted a three-month siege in 1568. The town was re-equipped in the 18th century, in particular with the Saint-Antoine gate built by engineer De Salmon on the ruins of an old church. Facing Spain, the gate owed its name to a chapel that welcomed pilgrims and was destroyed during the construction of the ramparts. With three massive arcades, the town was accessed via a drawbridge, the passage of the chains of which can still be seen today. In the 19th century, work on road and rail infrastructure led to the destruction of the old Saint-Germain gate which faced France.

Over the centuries, the fortified wall of Navarrenx has retained its main features. It outlines a reinforced firing range at each of its five corners with a bastion. Two of the five are fitted with anti-mine galleries, while a glacis and ground structures reinforce the town to the east, ahead of the moat. Several barracks were built inside the walls to house the garrison, one of which nowadays is used as the tourist information office. From the top of the ramparts (for example, from the crenellation platform overhanging the Saint-Antoine gate), there is a pleasant view of the Pyrenees and, below, the arches of the bridge of Navarrenx (13th century). Visits: There is free access to the 1818-metre perimeter of the town. The walls of the city contain bilingual (French-English) descriptive plaques that trace the history of each structure. Information on guided visits can be obtained from the Navarrenx district tourist office.

== Notable people ==
- Bertrand Dufresne (1736–1801), a cagot financier who became a national politician and served as director of the treasury in both the ancien régime and the revolutionary government.

== See also ==
- Communes of the Pyrénées-Atlantiques department
