= List of mayors of Victoria, British Columbia =

Mayor of Victoria
- Incumbent; Marianne Alto since November 3, 2022
- Style: Mayor
- Member of: City Council
- Seat: Victoria City Hall (Victoria, British Columbia, Canada)
- Appointer: Direct election by residents of Victoria
- Term length: 4 years
- Formation: August 1, 1862; 164 years ago
- First holder: Thomas Harris
- Website: https://www.victoria.ca/

This is a list of mayors of Victoria, the capital city of the Canadian province of British Columbia. The mayor leads Victoria City Council, the city's governing body, and is elected to a four-year term. The current mayor is Marianne Alto, who was first elected in 2022

== List of Mayors ==
No.	Mayor	Term start	Term end
Victoria incorporated as a city on August 1, 1862.
1	Thomas Harris	1862	1865
2	Lumley Franklin	1865	1866
3	William J. Macdonald	1866	1867
4	James Trimble	1867	1870
5	Alexander R. Robertson	1870	1871
(3)	William J. Macdonald (2nd term)	1871	1871
6	Richard Lewis	1872	1872
7	James E. McMillan	1872	1873
8	James D. Robinson	1873	1873
9	William Dalby	1873	1875
10	James S. Drummond	1875	1876
11	Montague W. Tyrwhitt-Drake	1876	1877
12	Roderick Finlayson	1877	1879
13	John Herbert Turner	1879	1881
14	Noah Shakespeare	1881	1882
15	Charles E. Redfern	1882	1883
16	Joseph Carey	1883	1884
17	Robert P. Rithet	1884	1885
18	James Fell	1885	1887
19	John Grant	1887	1891
20	Robert Beaven	1891	1893
21	John Teague	1894	1895
(20)	Robert Beaven (2nd term)	1896	1896
(15)	Charles E. Redfern (2nd term)	1896	1899
22	Charles Hayward	1900	1902
23	Alexander G. McCandless	1902	1903
24	George Henry Barnard	1904	1905
25	Alfred J. Morley	1905	1907
26	Lewis Hall	1908	1909
(25)	Alfred J. Morley (2nd term)	1909	1911
27	John L. Beckwith	1912	1912
(25)	Alfred J. Morley (3rd term)	1913	1913
28	Alexander Stewart	1914	1916
29	Albert E. Todd	1917	1919
30	Robert J. Porter	1919	1921
31	William M. Marchant	1921	1922
32	Reginald Hayward	1922	1924
33	John Carl Pendray	1924	1928
34	Herbert Anscomb	1928	1931
35	David Leeming	1931	1936
36	Andrew McGavin	1936	1944
37	Percy E. George	1944	1951
38	Claude L. Harrison	1951	1955
39	Percy B. Scurrah	1955	1961
40	Richard B. Wilson	1961	1966
41	Alfred W. Toone	1966	1966
42	Hugh R. Stephen	1966	1969
43	Courtney J. Haddock	1969	1971
44	G. Peter A. Pollen	1971	1975
45	Michael D. W. Young	1975	1979
46	William J. Tindall	1979	1981
(44)	G. Peter A. Pollen (2nd term)	1981	1985
47	Gretchen Brewin	1986	1990
48	David Turner	1991	1993
49	Robert Cross	1994	1999
50	Alan Lowe	2000	2008
51	Dean Fortin	2008	2014
52	Lisa Helps	2014	2022
53	Marianne Alto	2022	present

== See also ==
- Victoria City Council
