= Federation of Canadian Municipalities =

Canadian advocacy group

- Fédération canadienne des municipalités
- Abbreviation: FCM
- Formation: March 18, 1937; 89 years ago
- Merger of: Union of Canadian Municipalities; Dominion Conference of Mayors
- Type: Local government organization
- Legal status: Non-profit corporation
- Headquarters: Ottawa, Ontario
- Region served: Canada
- Members: 2,035
- Official languages: English, French
- Board Chair: Rebecca Bligh
- CEO: Carole Saab
- Website: www.fcm.ca
- Formerly called: Canadian Federation of Mayors and Municipalities

The Federation of Canadian Municipalities (FCM, (in French) Fédération canadienne des municipalités) is an advocacy group representing over 2000 Canadian municipalities. It is an organization with no formal power but significant ability to influence debate and policy, as it is a main national lobby group of mayors, councillors and other elected municipal officials. It negotiates with the Government of Canada's departments and agencies on behalf of municipalities, and provides fund administration services for the Government of Canada's departments and agencies.

== History ==
In 1901, the Union of Canadian Municipalities was formed to represent the interests of municipal governments. Another association, the Dominion Conference of Mayors was established in 1935. In 1937, these two associations were amalgamated into the Canadian Federation of Mayors and Municipalities which in 1976 would be renamed the Federation of Canadian Municipalities.

FCM was instrumental in negotiating the federal government's 2005 "New Deal for Cities" programme, under which Canadian federal gasoline taxes are remitted to municipalities.

== Outputs ==
=== Infrastructure ===
- Flow-through for $2 billion of federal funds to municipalities from a Gas Tax Fund.
- Worked to address municipal infrastructure deficit. Changes in federal policy are not attributable to any specific group or campaign. "In the 2009 budget, the federal government committed more than $12 billion over two years in new and accelerated infrastructure funding to municipal priorities."

=== Environment ===
- Flow-through for federal funds to support municipal initiatives that improve air, water and soil quality, and protect the climate through the Green Municipal Fund's below-market loans, grants, education and training. This programme was established by the Chrétien government in 2001 with $100 million "to stimulate investment in innovative municipal infrastructure", and "to support municipal government action to cut pollution, reduce greenhouse gases and improve quality of life".

=== International development ===
- Flow-through for federal aid for development cooperation in more than 40 countries across Asia, Africa, the Middle East, Latin America and the Caribbean since 1987.

== List of presidents ==
| No. | Year (Note: Year elected or appointed.) | Name | Office | Community | Province |
|---|---|---|---|---|---|
| 1 | 1937 | Edward Joseph Cragg | Mayor | Halifax | Nova Scotia |
| 2 | 1938 | J. E. Stanley Lewis | Mayor | Ottawa | Ontario |
| 3 | 1943 | Adhémar Raynault | Mayor | Montreal | Quebec |
| 4 | 1944 | Frederick J. Conboy | Mayor | Toronto | Ontario |
| 5 | 1945 (Note: Appointed to replace Frederick J. Conboy in 1944 or 1945.) | Robert Hood Saunders | Mayor | Toronto | Ontario |
| 6 | 1945 | Jonathan Webster Cornett | Mayor | Vancouver | British Columbia |
| 7 | 1946 | Garnet Coulter | Mayor | Winnipeg | Manitoba |
| 8 | 1947 | Ray T. Forbes | Mayor | Fredericton | New Brunswick |
| 9 | 1948 | Lucien-Hubert Borne | Mayor | Quebec City | Quebec |
| 10 | 1949 | George C. MacLean | Mayor | Saint Boniface | Manitoba |
| 11 | 1950 | Pierre-Horace Boivin | Mayor | Granby | Quebec |
| 12 | 1951 | Percy E. George | Mayor | Victoria | British Columbia |
| 13 | 1951 (Note: Appointed to replace Percy E. George in 1951 or 1952.) | G. C. Miller | Alderman | Victoria | British Columbia |
| 14 | 1952 | Archibald J. Mason | Mayor | Springhill | Nova Scotia |
| 15 | 1952 (Note: Appointed to replace Archibald J. Mason in 1952 or 1953. Went on to be elected to his own term in 1953.) | Joseph-Omer Asselin | Councillor | Montreal | Quebec |
| 16 | 1953 (Note: Appointed to replace Joseph-Omer Asselin in 1953 or 1954. Went on to be elected to his own term in 1954.) | Donald Hugh Mackay | Mayor | Calgary | Alberta |
| 17 | 1955 | J. David Stewart | Mayor | Charlottetown | Prince Edward Island |
| 18 | 1956 | William Hawrelak | Mayor | Edmonton | Alberta |
| 19 | 1957 | Lloyd Douglas Jackson | Mayor | Hamilton | Ontario |
| 20 | 1958 | Harry Mews | Mayor | St. John's | Newfoundland and Labrador |
| 21 | 1959 | Robert Simpson | Mayor | Arnprior | Ontario |
| 22 | 1960 | Sidney Buckwold | Mayor | Saskatoon | Saskatchewan |
| 23 | 1961 | Percy B. Scurrah | Mayor | Victoria | British Columbia |
| 24 (1 of 2) | 1961 (Note: Appointed to replace Percy B. Scurrah in 1961 or 1962.) | Chaim Kushner | Mayor | West Kildonan | Manitoba |
| 25 | 1962 | Joseph-Alfred Mongrain | Mayor | Trois-Rivières | Quebec |
| 26 | 1963 | Irvin William Akerley | Mayor | Dartmouth | Nova Scotia |
| 27 | 1963 (Note: Appointed to replace Irvin William Akerley in 1963 or 1964.) | Beth Woods | Mayor | New Westminster | British Columbia |
| 24 (2 of 2) | 1963 (Note: Appointed to replace Beth Woods in 1963 or 1964.) | Chaim Kushner | Mayor | West Kildonan | Manitoba |
| 28 | 1964 | Charles Augustus Vaughan | Mayor | Halifax | Nova Scotia |
| 29 | 1965 | Victor Copps | Mayor | Hamilton | Ontario |
| 30 | 1966 | William Rathie | Mayor | Vancouver | British Columbia |
| 31 | 1966 (Note: Appointed to replace William Rathie in 1966 or 1967.) | Reginald Dawson | Mayor | Mount Royal | Quebec |
| 32 | 1967 | Vincent Dantzer | Mayor | Edmonton | Alberta |
| 33 | 1968 | Albert Campbell | Mayor | Scarborough | Ontario |
| 34 | 1969 | Allan O'Brien | Mayor | Halifax | Nova Scotia |
| 35 | 1970 | Ivor Dent | Mayor | Edmonton | Alberta |
| 36 | 1971 | Marcel D'Amour | Mayor | Hull | Quebec |
| 37 | 1972 | Bud Bird | Mayor | Fredericton | New Brunswick |
| 38 | 1973 | Bernie Wolfe | Councillor | Winnipeg | Manitoba |
| 39 | 1974 | Paul Godfrey | Chairman | Metropolitan Toronto | Ontario |
| 40 | 1975 | Dan Munroe | Mayor | Glace Bay | Nova Scotia |
| 41 | 1976 | Jack Volrich | Mayor | Vancouver | British Columbia |
| 42 | 1978 | Paul-Olivier Trépanier | Mayor | Granby | Quebec |
| 43 | 1979 | Cec Purves | Mayor | Edmonton | Alberta |
| 44 | 1980 | Dennis Flynn | Mayor | Etobicoke | Ontario |
| 45 | 1981 | Daniel Brownlow | Mayor | Dartmouth | Nova Scotia |
| 46 | 1982 | Jean Pelletier | Mayor | Quebec City | Quebec |
| 47 | 1983 | Ted Brady | Mayor | Carlyle | Saskatchewan |
| 48 | 1984 | Doreen Lawson | Alderman | Burnaby | British Columbia |
| 49 | 1985 | Ron Cromwell | Alderman | Halifax | Nova Scotia |
| 50 | 1986 | Richard Gilbert | Councillor | Toronto | Ontario |
| 51 | 1987 | Jean Corbeil | Mayor | Anjou | Quebec |
| 52 | 1988 | George Cuff | Mayor | Spruce Grove | Alberta |
| 53 | 1989 | George Ferguson | Mayor | Abbotsford | British Columbia |
| 54 | 1990 | Ray O'Neill | Councillor | St. John's | Newfoundland and Labrador |
| 55 | 1991 | Doreen Quirk | Councillor | Markham | Ontario |
| 56 | 1992 | Margaret Delisle | Mayor | Sillery | Quebec |
| 57 | 1993 | Ron Hayter | Mayor | Edmonton | Alberta |
| 58 | 1994 | Laurence Mawhinney | Mayor | Lunenburg | Nova Scotia |
| 59 | 1995 | John Les | Mayor | Chilliwack | British Columbia |
| 60 | 1996 | Bryon Wilfert | Councillor | Richmond Hill | Ontario |
| 61 | 1997 | Jae Eadie | Deputy Mayor | Winnipeg | Manitoba |
| 61 | 1998 | Claude Cantin | Deputy Mayor | Quebec City | Quebec |
| 62 | 1999 | Sam Synard | Deputy Mayor | Marystown | Newfoundland and Labrador |
| 63 | 2000 | Joanne Monaghan | Councillor | Kitimat | British Columbia |
| 64 | 2001 | Jack Layton | Councillor | Toronto | Ontario |
| 65 | 2002 | John Schmal | Alderman | Calgary | Alberta |
| 66 | 2003 | Yves Ducharme | Mayor | Gatineau | Quebec |
| 67 | 2004 | Ann MacLean | Mayor | New Glasgow | Nova Scotia |
| 68 | 2005 | Michael Coleman | Mayor | Duncan | British Columbia |
| 69 | 2005 (Note: Appointed to replace Michael Coleman in 2005 or 2006.) | Gloria Kovach | Councillor | Guelph | Ontario |
| 70 | 2006 (Note: Appointed to replace Gloria Kovach in 2006 or 2007. Went on to be elected to his own term in 2007.) | Gord Steeves | Councillor | Winnipeg | Manitoba |
| 71 | 2008 | Jean Perrault | Mayor | Sherbrooke | Quebec |
| 72 | 2009 | Basil Stewart | Mayor | Summerside | Prince Edward Island |
| 73 | 2010 | Hans Cunningham | Director | Central Kootenay | British Columbia |
| 74 | 2011 | Berry Vrbanovic | Councillor | Kitchener | Ontario |
| 75 | 2012 | Karen Leibovici | Councillor | Edmonton | Alberta |
| 76 | 2013 | Claude Dauphin | Mayor | Lachine | Quebec |
| 77 | 2014 | Brad Woodside | Mayor | Fredericton | New Brunswick |
| 78 | 2015 | Raymond Louie | Councillor | Vancouver | British Columbia |
| 79 | 2016 | Clark Somerville | Regional Councillor | Halton Hills | Ontario |
| 80 | 2017 | Jenny Gerbasi | Councillor | Winnipeg | Manitoba |
| 81 | 2018 | Vicki-May Hamm | Mayor | Magog | Quebec |
| 82 | 2019 | Bill Karsten | Councillor | Halifax | Nova Scotia |
| 83 | 2020 | Garth Frizzell | Councillor | Prince George | British Columbia |
| 84 | 2021 | Joanne Vanderheyden | Mayor | Strathroy-Caradoc | Ontario |
| 85 | 2022 | Taneen Rudyk | Councillor | Vegreville | Alberta |
| 86 | 2023 | Scott Pearce | Mayor | Gore | Quebec |
| 87 | 2024 | Rebecca Bligh | Councillor | Vancouver | British Columbia |

== See also ==
- List of local government organizations
