= Pemberton Memorial Operating Room =

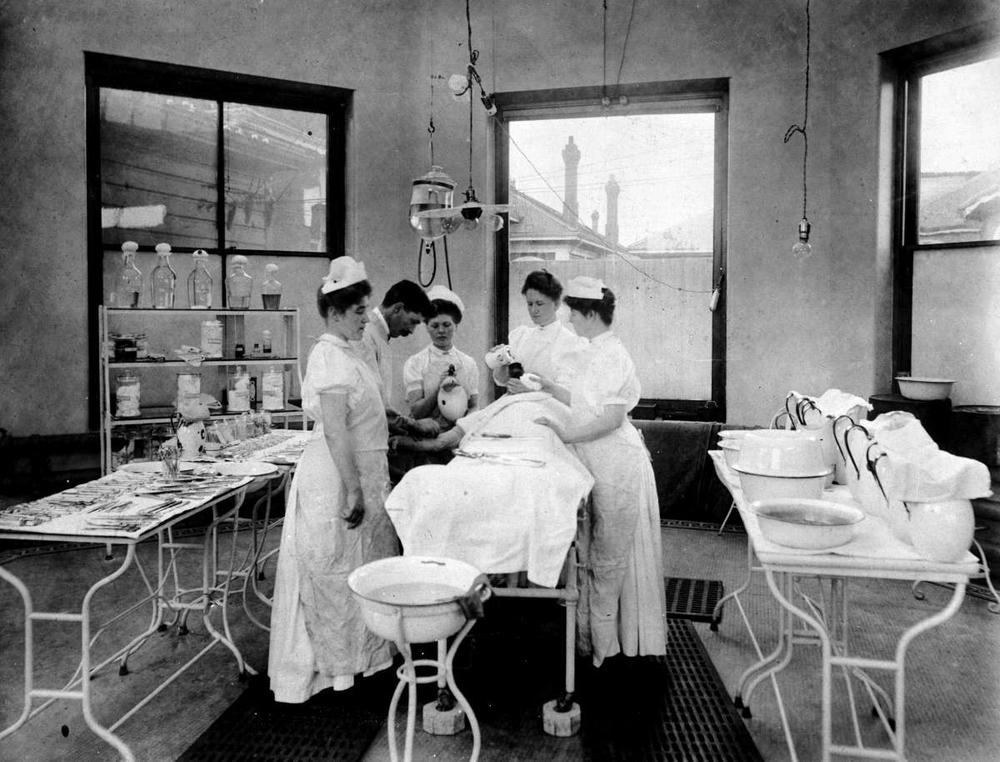
- The operating room in 1902
- Interactive map of the Pemberton Memorial Operating Room area

General information
- Status: Vacant
- Type: Medical building
- Coordinates: 48.432852°N 123.327862°W
- Named for: Joseph Despard Pemberton
- Owner: Royal Jubilee Hospital

Design and construction
- Architect: John Teague
- Developer: Thomas Catterall

National Historic Site of Canada
- Official name: Pemberton Memorial Operating Room National Historic Site of Canada
- Designated: 28 November 2005

The Pemberton Memorial Operating Room is a National Historic Site of Canada, the first operating room of the Royal Jubilee Hospital in Victoria, British Columbia. It established the Royal Jubilee Hospital as the leading surgical hospital in the province.

The construction of the building to house the operating room was financed by a bequest left by Joseph Pemberton, and supplemented with additional funding by his widow Teresa Pemberton, who also partially funded the purchase of equipment. The funds were originally intended for the construction of a maternity ward, but were insufficient for such a project.

Interior components were selected and designed to be easily cleaned and disinfected after each surgical procedure, including the mosaic tile floor, and it was connected to a sterilizing room. The design implemented anti-sepsis techniques developed by Joseph Lister, who visited the room in 1897 and was favourably impressed.

It was used daily from its completion in 1896 until 1925, when the hospital expanded and built six new operating rooms. The Pemberton Memorial Operating Room was declared a municipal heritage site in 1995 and recognized as a National Historic Site of Canada on 28 November 2005.

== Background ==
John Chapman Davie Jr. began lobbying for a hospital in Victoria in the mid 1880s, planning for a single-level pavilion design of interconnected buildings. The Royal Jubilee Hospital was opened in May 1890, with three wards, an administrative block, residences, and a laboratory. The hospital's debt grew during the early 1890s, but as a result of addressing an 1893 smallpox epidemic, the city passed a bylaw allowing it to pay off the mortgage "as a show of appreciation".

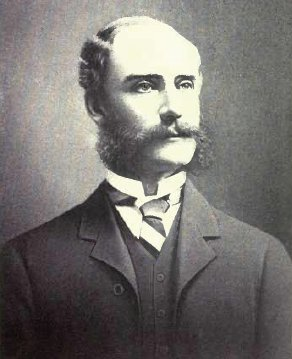
Joseph Pemberton, whose bequest allowed the construction of the operating room

On 9 January 1894, F.B. Pemberton spoke to the hospital's board of directors, stating that a $2,000 bequest had been left to the hospital by his father Joseph Pemberton, who had died in 1893 as a result of a heart attack while horseback riding. Various proposals were made for its use, but the bequest stipulated that it was to be used for development of new property. The board elected to build a maternity ward, for which Joseph Pemberton's widow, Teresa Jane Pemberton donated an additional $1,500. However, the $3,500 was insufficient for such a project.

The hospital's board of directors debated potential uses of the funds, and on 7 October 1895 settled on building an operating room favoured by Davie. It would implement the anti-sepsis techniques developed by Joseph Lister, which Davie had studied during a sabbatical in Europe in the 1880s. The winning design, "Plan 3" by John Teague, was selected on 20 March 1896, and the winning tender for its construction was submitted by Thomas Catterall for $3,614. Teresa Pemberton donated the additional $114.

The cornerstone was installed on 15 May 1896 by Teresa Pemberton, in a ceremony during which she was presented with a silver trowel to "show appreciation for her generous support and flexibility towards the project". The trowel's handle was carved from an oak timber taken from the Beaver, the first steamship to operate in the Pacific Northwest of North America. The silver blade was made from silver mined at Bluebell mine, the base from matte obtained from Silver King mine, and the gold ferrule from matte obtained from Le Roi gold mine. Neither the cornerstone, nor the time capsule buried beneath it, has been discovered since then.

Pemberton became the building's namesake for his posthumous bequest. By July 1896, nearing completion of construction, the board of directors was informed that $500 would be required to equip the operating room; this was provided by the Women’s Auxiliary and another donation by Teresa Pemberton. Upon completion, it "established the Jubilee as the leading surgical hospital" in British Columbia.

== Description ==
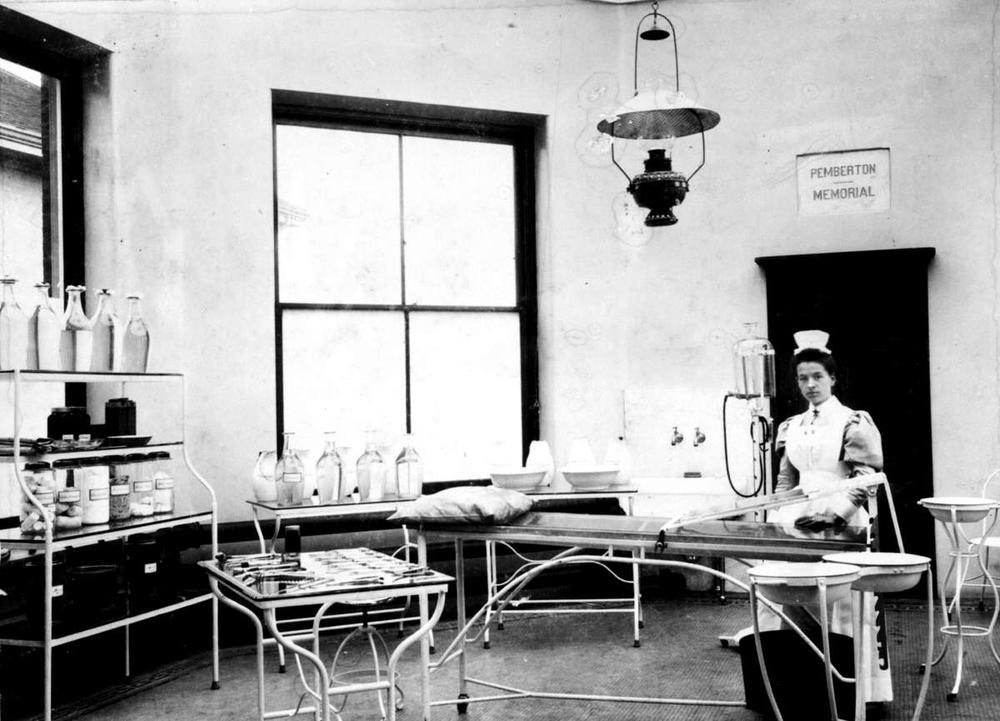
The operating room, circa 1900. Above the door can be seen a marble slab with the words "Pemberton Memorial" carved into it, which was required per the agreement for funding.

The foundation for the building was made of stone. The octagonal operating room is connected to a 12-by-24-foot (3.7 by 7.3 m) sterilizing room at its north end. Painted plaster covered the interior brick walls, and the concrete floor was overlain with a ceramic tile mosaic. Its features, including its large windows, were designed to be easily cleaned and disinfected after each surgical procedure. The original design included kerosene lamps, which were replaced in 1897 by electrical fixtures when the entire hospital was connected to the electricity grid. The building was connected to the hospital via a 15-metre (49 ft) corridor.

It had sufficient capacity only for the patient and surgical team. On 13 September 1897, Lister visited the facility and was "favourably impressed". He recommended the addition of a post-anesthesia recovery room, and the hospital built two the following year for $1,000, the first post-operative recovery rooms in Canada.

A second sterilizing room was built as an addition to the building in 1918. The operating room was used daily until 1925, when six new operating rooms were built in the hospital's east wing expansion. It would be used as the home for the hospital's radiography department, then its cancer agency, and finally its medical records department.

== Heritage site ==
Location of Pemberton Memorial Operating Room within the hospital's campus

In 1981, the Victoria Medical Society lobbied Victoria City Council to protect the Pemberton Memorial Operating Room under bylaw 173. The hospital's board of directors opposed heritage status for the building, as it would interfere with the hospital's development plans. In 1983, the Government of British Columbia cut its spending, including expenditures for health care capital projects, delaying the building's demolition.

An excavation of the building's contents in 1991 found numerous artefacts employed "in the early days" of the building; these were preserved. In 1995, Victoria City Council designated the building, including the operating room and the sterilizing ante-chamber, a municipal heritage site.

It was recognized as a National Historic Site on 28 November 2005, and was officially announced on 3 August 2006 along with the site of the Cypress Hills Massacre and the archaeological site Pointe-du-Buisson. It was listed on the Canadian Register of Historic Places on 10 July 2009. A commemorative plaque was installed, and unveiled by Gary Lunn and Ida Chong during a ceremony on 25 June 2010.

== Legacy ==
In 1909, Teresa Pemberton also provided funding to build the Pemberton Chapel to commemorate her husband. The silver trowel presented to her is now held in the collections of the Royal British Columbia Museum.

The building and operating room represented a "transitional moment in the history of hospital design", in which earlier designs separated the operating room from the hospital, and later designs restricting access to only the patient and surgical team. It also represented a transition in hospital governance, from one of primarily charitable scope "for the poor and destitute" to being managed as a scientific institution.

In 2004, the Victoria Medical Society formed the Victoria Medical Heritage Society as a charity to fund restoration of the Pemberton Memorial Operating Room. It also plans to build a medical history museum adjacent to the building. The chapel and operating room have been connected by a walkway with a garden and courtyard.
