= Richard Lewis (Canadian politician) =

Former Mayor of Victoria

Mayor of Victoria, British Columbia
- In office 1872–1872
- Preceded by: William John Macdonald
- Succeeded by: James E. McMillan

Personal details
- Born: London, England
- Profession: architect

Richard Lewis (1824 – January 1875) was the sixth mayor of Victoria, British Columbia, for one term in 1872.

Lewis arrived in the Colony of Vancouver Island in 1858 from San Francisco. He was an architect by training, but started an undertaking business because of a lack of work for architects in the city's early days.

He served as an alderman on the first city council in 1862.

In the 1870s, Lewis returned to architecture, and designed the Masonic Temple and the Lascelles building at Government and Fort Streets.

== See also ==
List of mayors of Victoria, British Columbia
