= Origin of the kingdom of Mysore =

Flag of the former princely state of Mysore.

The Kingdom of Mysore (Kannada: ಮೈಸೂರು ಸಂಸ್ಥಾನ, romanized: maisuru samsthana; 1399 - 1947 CE) was a kingdom of southern India founded in 1399 by Yaduraya in the region of the modern city of Mysore. The Wodeyar dynasty, as the ruling family is known, ruled the southern Karnataka region until Indian independence in 1947, when the kingdom was merged with the Union of India.

== Origin ==
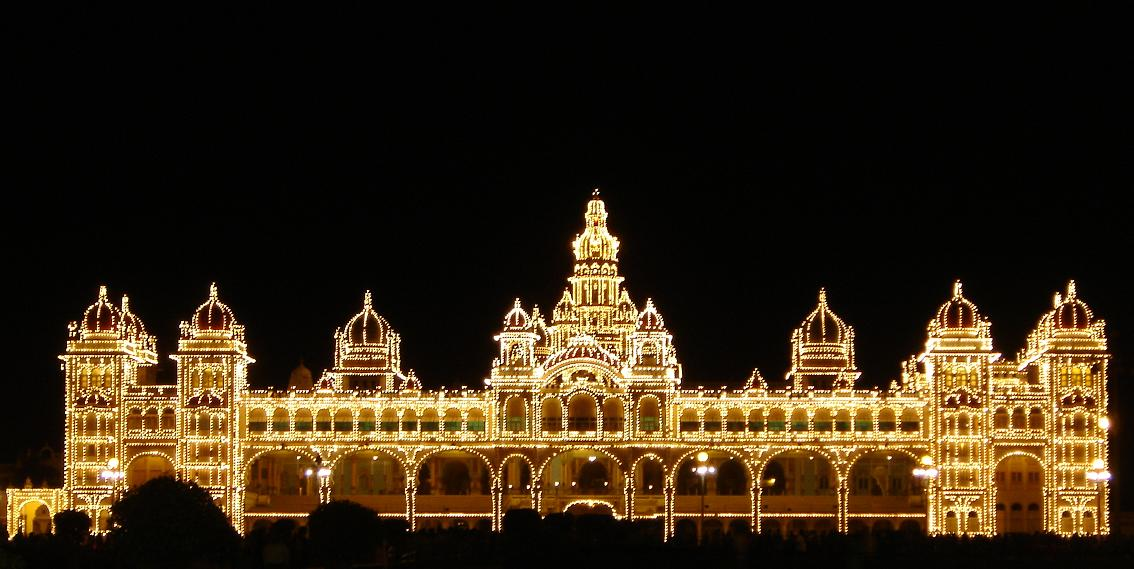
Mysore palace lit up at night

Sources for the history of the kingdom include numerous lithic (stone) and copper plate inscriptions, written records in the Mysore palace and contemporary literary sources in the Kannada language such as the Kanthirava Narasaraja Vijaya, describing the achievements of King Kanthirava Narasaraja I, court music and composition forms in vogue; Chikkadevaraja Vamshavali, describing the Wodeyar family history; Chikkadevaraja Binnapam, on the achievements of King Chikka Devaraja; and Keladinripavijayam. Information about Haider Ali and Tipu Sultan are available from various linguistic sources including Nishan-i-Haidari in Persian and Haider Name in Kannada.

Other historical sources are Apratimavira Charite, Chikkadevaraja Vijaya and Chikka Devaraja Yaso-bhushana, on the achievements of King Chikka Devaraja; Kanthirava Narasaraja Charitra, on the life of King Kanthirava Narasaraja I; Deva Raja Vijaya, on the reign of Dodda Devaraja; Maisuru Arasugala Purvabhyudaya; Kalale Doregala Vamshavali; documentation pertaining to the Dutch East India Company relations with Mysore for the 1762–1790 period; Portuguese sources on the life of Haider Ali; and written documents by catholic missionaries from the mid-17th century.

According to legend, when the city of Dwaraka (in modern Gujarat state) had drowned in the ocean, the Hindu god Krishna asked Parvati (consort of the Hindu god Shiva) to protect his descendants and make them rulers of the southern region of Yadushaila (modern Melkote in Karnataka state). As per his wishes, Parvati brought Krishna's descendants to the Chamundi hills in Mysore and made them rulers there.

The historical origins of the kingdom are obscure. The kingdom is first mentioned in early 16th-century Kannada literature from the time of the Vijayanagara King Achyuta Deva Raya, while the kingdom's own earliest available inscriptions date from the rule of a petty chieftain, Timmaraja II, in 1551. It is known that the kingdom originated as a small state based in the modern city of Mysore and that it was established by two brothers, Yaduraya (also known as Vijaya) and Krishnaraya. The origin of the brothers is, however, contested. Some historians claim a northern origin, saying that they came from Dwaraka, while others argue that they were originally from the Karnataka region. The earliest mention of their origin in the city of Dwaraka and their journey down to the Mysore region is found in the writings of Govinda Vaidya (17th century), court poet of Narasaraja Wodeyar, and is later repeated in the writings of Tirumalarya, court poet of Chikka Devaraja Wodeyar. According to these texts, the two brothers arrived at Mysore in 1399, for reasons which differ by text. At that time, the incumbent King Chamaraja died, leaving behind his queen, Devajammanni, and a princess, Chikkadevarasi, but no male heir to the throne. Yaduraya killed Maranayaka, the army commander who tried to assert his power over the royal family, married princess Chikkadevarasi, and was crowned with the feudal title "Wodeyar", which the ensuing dynasty retained.

This theory has been rejected by other historians, who counter that it is farfetched to believe that two brothers could arrive there from a distant city and begin ruling as kings. Historians like Nobuhiro Ota, David Leeming and Aya Ikegame instead suggest that the Wodeyars were local feudal lords that belonged to potter caste, who adopted a puranic legend to claim a Lunar Dynasty lineage. Some other historians claim that the founders of the kingdom were descendants of the local Tonnur Hoysalas. According to this theory, when the Hoysala Empire succumbed to the Delhi Sultanate invasion in 1327 (and the capital Halebidu was sacked), the Hoysala family withdrew to the Tonnur region (modern Tondanur near Melkote in modern Mandya district) and continued to rule from there as petty chieftains under the Vijayanagara Empire. These historians claim that Yaduraya, the chieftain of Melkote, rescued the queen of Mysore by killing the commander Maranayaka, married princess Chikkadevarasi, and launched the new Wodeyar dynasty. However this legend has been dismissed as a myth by Aya Ikegame. According to another theory, the brothers were most likely Yadava fugitives from the Vijayanagara Empire court who took advantage of the upheaval caused by the king's death to gain control of the Mysore region. It is known that the Mysore feudal family initially controlled no more than a handful of villages and grew into a kingdom only after the fall of the Vijayanagara Empire in 1565.
