= Joseph Carey =

Joseph Carey may refer to:

- Joseph Carey (Canadian politician) (1829–1910), former mayor of Victoria, British Columbia
- Joseph M. Carey (1845–1924), lawyer, rancher, judge and politician in Wyoming
- Joseph W. Carey (1859–1937), Irish artist
- Joe Carey (born 1975), Irish Fine Gael politician
- Joe Carey (American football) (1895–1962), American football player
