= Sandy Stewart =

Sandy Stewart may refer to:

- Sandy Stewart (singer) (born 1937), jazz singer, mother of pianist Bill Charlap
- Sandy Stewart (musician) (born 1958), singer from Texas
- Sandy Stewart (producer) (1930–1998), Canadian television producer and writer
- Sandy Stewart (footballer) (born 1965), Scottish footballer and football manager
- Sandy Stewart (coach), American volleyball coach

== See also ==
- Alexander Stewart (disambiguation)
- Stewart (name)
