= William Tindall =

William Tindall may refer to:

- William York Tindall, American Joycean scholar
- William D. Tindall, Canadian politician

== See also ==
- Bill Tindall (Howard Wilson Tindall Jr.), American aerospace engineer, NASA engineer and manager
- William Tyndale, English scholar and leading figure in the Protestant Reformation
- William T. Tyndall, U.S. Representative from Missouri
