= Alex Stewart =

Alex Stewart may refer to:

- Alex Stewart (boxer) (1964–2016), English boxer
- Alex Stewart (writer) (born 1958), writer (who also goes by the name Sandy Mitchell)
- Alex Stewart (American football) (born 1964), Jamaican-born American football defensive end
- Alex Stewart (Australian footballer) (1908–1993), Australian rules footballer
- Alex Stewart (goalkeeper), Scottish football goalkeeper
- Alex Stewart (forward), Scottish football forward, son of goalkeeper above
- Richard Gordon (Scottish author) (1947–2009), Scottish author who wrote under the pen name Alex Stewart
- Alex Stewart, runner up on the American dating show Love Island

== See also ==
- Alexander Stewart (disambiguation)
- Alex Stuart (disambiguation)
- Alexander Stuart (disambiguation)
- Alec Stewart (disambiguation)
