= Alexander McCandless =

Alexander McCandless may refer to:

- Christopher McCandless (1968–1992), also known as Alexander McCandless, American hiker who died in the Alaska wilderness
- Alexander G. McCandless (1861–1939), mayor of Victoria, British Columbia, 1902–1903
