= Alexander Stewart of Darnley =

Alexander Stewart of Darnley may refer to:

- Alexander Stewart of Darnley (d.1374), Scottish nobleman
- Alexander Stewart of Darnley (d.1404), Scottish nobleman

== See also ==
- Alexander Stewart (disambiguation)
