= Frederickton =

Frederickton may refer to:

- Frederickton, Newfoundland and Labrador, Canada
- Frederickton, New South Wales, Australia

== See also ==
- Fredericktown (disambiguation)
- Fredericton (disambiguation)
