= Stuart Alexander =

Stuart Alexander may refer to:

- Stuart Alexander (murderer) (1961–2005), American businessman convicted of murder
- Stuart Alexander (Australian politician), see Robertson ministry
- Stuart Alexander & Company, an Australasian company founded in 1884

== See also ==
- Stewart Alexander (disambiguation)
- Alexander Stuart (disambiguation)
