= Alexander Stuart =

Alexander Stuart may refer to:

- Alexander Stuart (scientist) (1673–1742), scientist, winner of the Copley Medal
- Alexander Hugh Holmes Stuart (1807–1891), United States Secretary of the Interior between 1850 and 1853
- Alexander Stuart (Australian politician) (1824–1886), Premier of New South Wales, Australia between 1883 and 1885
- Alex Stuart (footballer) (born 1940), Scottish former footballer
- Alexander Stuart (writer), author and screenwriter of The War Zone
- Alexander Stuart (Canadian politician) (1857–1928), Ontario farmer and political figure
- Alexander Stuart (New Zealand politician) (c1875–1954), New Zealand politician
- Alexander C. Stuart (1831–1898), British-American naval painter
- Alexander Stuart, 5th Lord Blantyre (died 1704), Scottish nobleman, soldier and politician
- Alexander Stuart, 5th Earl of Moray (1634–1701), Scottish nobleman
- Alexander Moody Stuart (1809–1898), minister of the Free Church of Scotland
- Alexander Mackenzie Stuart, Baron Mackenzie-Stuart (1924–2000), Scottish advocate and judge
- Alexander Stuart (priest), Anglican priest in Ireland in the 19th-century

== See also ==
- Alex Stuart (disambiguation)
- Alexander Stewart (disambiguation)
- Alex Stewart (disambiguation)
