= Leeming =

Leeming is the name of several places in the world, including:

- Leeming, Western Australia
- Leeming, North Yorkshire, England
- Leeming Bar, North Yorkshire
  - location of RAF Leeming
- Leeming, West Yorkshire, England

Leeming is also the surname of several well-known people, including:

- Carol Leeming, a British singer and songwriter.
- David Leeming, Canadian politician
- David Adams Leeming, American philologist
- Jan Leeming (born 1942), a British TV presenter and newsreader
- J. J. Leeming, a British road traffic engineer
- John F. Leeming, co-founder of the Lancashire Aero Club and author of children's books
- Marjorie Leeming (1903–1987), Canadian tennis player, badminton player and teacher
