= Thomas Harris (British Columbia politician) =

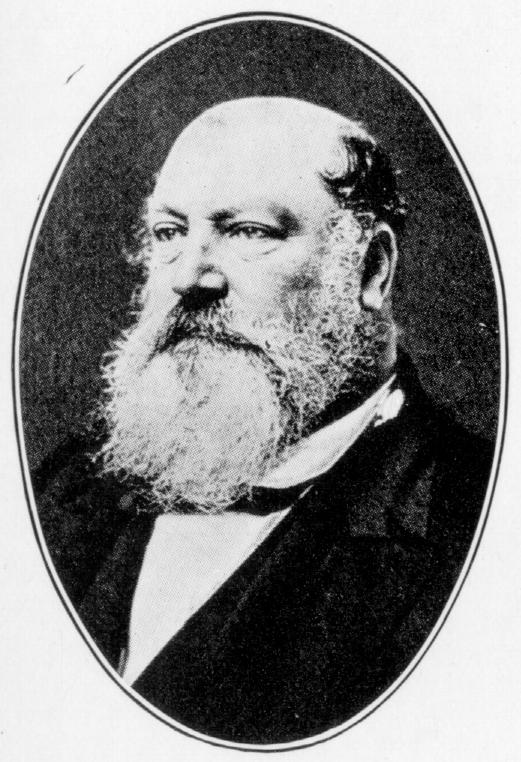
- Harris in Office

1st mayor of Victoria, British Columbia
- In office 1862–1865
- Preceded by: position established
- Succeeded by: Lumley Franklin

Personal details
- Born: 1817? England
- Died: November 29, 1884 (aged 67) Victoria, British Columbia

Thomas Harris (1817? – November 29, 1884) was the first mayor of Victoria, British Columbia, serving from 1862 to 1865. He was succeeded as mayor by Lumley Franklin.

Born in Almeley, Herefordshire, Harris married Eliza Dickinson, a widow, in Liverpool in 1848. Harris came to Victoria by way of California in 1858, at the height of the Cariboo gold rush. He ran a slaughterhouse for a time, then became a butcher shortly afterward and made his fortune.

A jovial man who had an opinion on everything and wasn't afraid to tell whoever would listen, he was a likely candidate for election in 1862 when the town's father decided to incorporate the town. At election time, Harris won by "forest of hands" amid a group of 600 men. During his second official council meeting, the 300 pound (136 kg) Harris had a chair collapse under his own weight.

In 1873, he was named sergeant-at-arms for the provincial legislature. He was named high sheriff for Vancouver Island in 1876.

Harris Green, an area within Victoria, is named after him.

His stepson Robert Dickinson took over the shop in New Westminster and served as mayor of that city.
