= John Teague =

John Teague may refer to:

- John Teague (American politician) (1944–2023), American politician
- John Teague (Canadian politician) (1833–1902), Canadian architect and politician

== See also ==
- Josh Teague (born 1975), Australian politician
