= Claude L. Harrison =

Canadian politician

Claude Harrison

Mayor of Victoria, British Columbia
- In office 1951–1955
- Preceded by: Percy E. George
- Succeeded by: Percy B. Scurrah

Personal details
- Born: September 20, 1886 Victoria, British Columbia
- Died: May 12, 1986 (aged 99) Victoria, British Columbia

Claude Lionel Harrison (September 20, 1886 – March 12, 1986) became the 44th mayor of Victoria, British Columbia, Canada, after serving as the city's prosecutor for forty years.

The son of judge Eli Harrison and Eunice Mary Louisa Seabrook, he was born in Victoria. He was 64 years old when he was elected as mayor, serving from 1951 until 1955.

In 1953, during Harrison's term as mayor, the Harrison Yacht Pond was built for use by model boats.

After John Maitland Marshall, a librarian suspected of leftist leanings, was fired in 1954, Harrison stated that he would support the burning of any subversive books found on library shelves.

Harrison died in Victoria at the age of 99.
