= Alec Stewart (disambiguation) =

Alec Stewart (born 1963) is a retired English cricketer.

Alec Stewart may also refer to:

- Alec Stewart (Australian footballer) (1915–1976), Australian footballer for North Melbourne in the VFL
- Alec Stewart (footballer, born 1868) (1868–?), Scottish association footballer
- Alec Stewart (racehorse trainer) (1955–2004), Scottish racehorse trainer

== See also ==
- Alex Stewart (disambiguation)
