= John L. Beckwith =

John Leander Beckwith (March 5, 1856 – June 3, 1934) was an entrepreneur and politician in British Columbia, Canada. He served as mayor of Victoria in 1912.

He was born in Cornwallis Township, Nova Scotia (near modern-day Kentville), the third son of John Albert Beckwith and Rebecca Ann Barnaby, and was educated there. His grandfather, Mayhew Beckwith, was a Member of Provincial Parliament representing Kings County. The Beckwith family was an established one in the area, having been part of the original group of New England Planters who were land grantees in Cornwallis back in 1760. John Leander Beckwith began work as a retail clerk at the age of sixteen and came to British Columbia in 1884 to join his elder brother William Sibley Beckwith. He worked as a salesman for various companies until 1905, when he opened his own business. Beckwith operated as an agent for manufacturers and also was an insurance and real estate agent. He returned briefly to Nova Scotia and married Agnes Smith (née McLeod), and brought her with him to Victoria. In 1903, with Harlan Carey Brewster, he founded the Clayouquot Sound Canning Company, which canned salmon. He was president of the Victoria Board of Trade and a director of the local Chamber of Commerce.

After serving as an alderman several times, Beckwith ran unsuccessfully for the Victoria City seat in the provincial assembly in 1900 and then for the Victoria City seat in the Canadian House of Commons in 1906. He served on Victoria City Council from 1899 to 1906 and also served 14 years on the local school board ending with his death in 1934. Beckwith helped to establish Victoria College in 1921. He had worked for Belgian relief during the First World War and in recognition of his service the King of Belgium gave an award to him.

Beckwith defeated Alfred J. Morley by forty-nine votes to become mayor in 1912; Morley defeated Beckwith the following year.

He died in Victoria at the age of 78.

Beckwith married Agnes Smith McLeod (1857–1927) on 20 September 1888 at Berwick, Kings, Nova Scotia, and had four children: Harold Arthur Beckwith (1889), Kate Evelyn Beckwith (1892), Alfred Frederick Edward (1894), and Grace Dean McLeod Beckwith (1901). He is the grandfather of Canadian composer John Beckwith.

Beckwith Street and Beckwith Park in Saanich were named in his honour.
