= Fredericktown =

Fredericktown may refer to a location in the United States:

- Fredericktown, Kentucky
- Fredericktown, Maryland
- Fredericktown, Missouri
- Fredericktown, Ohio
- Fredericktown, Columbiana County, Ohio
- Fredericktown, Pennsylvania

== See also ==
- Fredericton (disambiguation)
- Frederickton (disambiguation)
