= Alexander Stewart =

Alexander Stewart may refer to:

== Politicians ==
- Alexander Stewart (British Army officer) (c. 1739–1794), British army general, Scottish politician, MP for Kirkcudbright Stewartry 1786–94
- Alexander Stewart (1746–1831), Irish MP
- Alexander Stewart (Nova Scotian politician) (1794–1865), lawyer, judge and politician in Nova Scotia
- Alexander Robert Stewart (1795–1850), Irish MP
- Alexander Stewart (American politician) (1829–1912), American politician
- Alexander David Stewart (1852–1899), Canadian politician
- Alexander Stewart (British Columbia politician), mayor of Victoria, British Columbia from 1914 to 1916
- Alexander Stewart (Conservative politician) (born 1962), Conservative Member of the Scottish Parliament

== Nobles ==
- Alexander Stewart, 4th High Steward of Scotland (died 1283), Scottish magnate
- Alexander Stewart of Bonkyll (c. 1271–1319), Scottish nobleman
- Alexander Stewart, Earl of Buchan (1343–1405), also known as the "Wolf of Badenoch", Scottish prince and magnate
- Alexander Stewart, Earl of Mar (1375–1435), Scottish nobleman
- Alexander Stewart, Duke of Rothesay (1430–1430)
- Alexander Stewart, Duke of Albany (c. 1454–1485), Scottish prince and magnate
- Alexander Stewart, 2nd Earl of Buchan (died 1505)
- Alexander Stewart, Duke of Ross (1514–1515)
- Alexander Stewart, 1st Earl of Galloway (1580–1649)
- Alexander Stewart, 6th Earl of Galloway (c. 1694–1773)
- Alexander Stewart (1699–1781) (1697/99–1781), ancestor of the Marquess of Londonderry

== Religion ==
- Alexander Stewart (bishop of Ross) (died 1371), Scottish prelate, Bishop of Ross
- Alexander Stewart (archbishop of St Andrews) (c. 1493–1513), Scottish prelate
- Alexander Stewart (bishop of Moray) (1477–1537), Scottish prelate, Bishop of Moray
- Alexander Stewart (moderator) (died 1915), principal of St Andrews University, moderator of the General Assembly of the Church of Scotland in 1911
- Alexander Doig Stewart (1926–1999), bishop of the Episcopal Diocese of Western Massachusetts

== Sports ==
- Alexander Stewart (rugby union) (1852–1945), Scottish international rugby union player
- Alexander Stewart (cricketer) (1858–1904), English cricketer

== Others ==
- Alexander Stewart (diplomat) (died 1593), Scottish landowner involved in negotiations about Mary, Queen of Scots
- Alexander Stewart (singer) (born 1999), Canadian singer, songwriter and YouTuber
- Alexander Boyd Stewart (1904–1981), Scottish agriculturalist
- Alexander Dron Stewart (1883–1969), 20th-century Scottish physician and public health expert
- Alexander P. Stewart (1821–1908), American Confederate general
- Alexander Turney Stewart (1803–1876), American businessman

== See also ==
- Alexander Stewart Provincial Park, a provincial park in central Ontario, Canada
- Alex Stewart (disambiguation)
- Sandy Stewart (disambiguation)
- Alexander Stuart (disambiguation)
- Alex Stuart (disambiguation)
- Stewart Alexander (disambiguation)
