= Peter Pollen =

Canadian politician (1927–2017)

Leader of the Conservative Party of British Columbia
- In office March 1985 – August 1986
- Preceded by: Brian Westwood
- Succeeded by: Peter B. Macdonald (1991)

Mayor of Victoria
- In office 1981–1985
- Preceded by: William J. Tindall
- Succeeded by: Gretchen Brewin
- In office 1971–1975
- Preceded by: Courtney J. Haddock
- Succeeded by: Michael D. W. Young

Personal details
- Born: October 26, 1927
- Died: January 3, 2017 (aged 89) Victoria, British Columbia, Canada
- Education: University of Toronto

Peter Pollen (October 26, 1927 – January 3, 2017) was a Canadian politician who served as leader of the Conservative Party of British Columbia from 1985 to 1986. He previously served as mayor of Victoria from 1971 to 1975 and from 1981 to 1985.

== Early life and career ==
Pollen was raised in Saskatchewan and Ontario and came to Victoria at the age of 34 to assist a local Ford dealer. Instead, the dealer persuaded him to take over the dealership.

== Political career ==
Pollen ran unsuccessfully as the British Columbia Social Credit Party candidate in the 1968 by-election in Oak Bay. From 1985 to 1986, he was the leader of the Conservative Party of British Columbia. In 2011, the Hallmark Society, an association dedicated to heritage preservation in Victoria, presented Pollen with a merit award for "his contributions to the heritage fabric of Victoria".

== Personal life ==
Pollen died on January 3, 2017, at the age of 89.
