= Alfred W. Toone =

Canadian politician

Mayor of Victoria, British Columbia
- In office 1966
- Preceded by: Richard B. Wilson
- Succeeded by: Hugh R. Stephen

Personal details
- Born: Alfred Walter Toone; 14 May 1916 England
- Died: 15 November 1966 (aged 50) Victoria, British Columbia, Canada

Alfred Walter Toone (14 May 1916 – 15 November 1966) was a Canadian politician, who served as mayor of Victoria, British Columbia, in 1966. He died in office of a heart attack.
