= Courtney J. Haddock =

Canadian politician (1906–1972)

Courtney Haddock

Mayor of Victoria, British Columbia
- In office 1969–1971
- Preceded by: Hugh R. Stephen
- Succeeded by: Peter Pollen

Personal details
- Born: May 24, 1906 Winnipeg, Manitoba
- Died: February 19, 1972 (aged 65) Victoria, British Columbia

Courtney John Haddock (May 24, 1906 – February 19, 1972) was a Canadian politician and had been the mayor of Victoria, British Columbia from 1969 to 1971.
