= Eliza Arden Robinson =

English-born Canadian social reformer

Eliza Arden Robinson Redfern (April 3, 1849 – March 19, 1906) was an English-born Canadian social reformer.

The daughter of William Augustus Robinson, an Irish Anglican clergyman, she was born in St Neots and came to Victoria, British Columbia in 1875. Two years later, she married Charles E. Redfern; the couple had six daughters and three sons. Because her husband was a prominent business owner and politician, she became part of Victoria's elite. She also donated her time in support of the less fortunate. Robinson supported the Children's Aid Society of Victoria, the British Columbia Protestant Orphans' Home and the Friendly Help Society. She served as vice-president of the Children's Aid Society from 1904 to 1906 and also helped the Society find foster families.

She died in Victoria. On the day of her death, flags in the city were flown at half-mast.
