= Robert John Porter =

Canadian politician (1867–1922)

Robert John Porter, Jr. (1867 – April 24, 1922) was a politician in British Columbia, Canada. He served as mayor of Victoria from 1919 to 1921.

The son of Robert John and Alice Porter, he was born at the family cattle farm in Saanich and later entered the family butcher business. Porter married Flora Beaton in 1898. He served on the board of directors for the Royal Jubilee Hospital.

Porter was defeated by William M. Marchant when he ran for reelection as mayor in 1921, in part due to a smear campaign led by prohibitionist Christopher Rowland "Joe" North, who accused Parker of being involved with gambling and rum-running. After the election, North was successfully sued for accusations of wrongdoing he had made during the campaign and he was later arrested after he made slanderous remarks against the local police.

He died of pneumonia at the age of 55 just four months after the election.

Robert J. Porter Park was named in his honour.
