= Albert E. Todd =

Mayor of Victoria, British Columbia
- In office 1917–1919
- Preceded by: Alexander Stewart
- Succeeded by: Robert J. Porter

Personal details
- Born: August 5, 1878 Victoria, British Columbia
- Died: October 26, 1928 (aged 50) Seattle, Washington

Albert E. Todd (August 5, 1878 – October 26, 1928) served as mayor of Victoria, British Columbia Canada from 1917 to 1919. He was seen as a visionary whose impact was felt both during his term and after. He was born to Jacob Hunter Todd and Rosanna Wigley in 1878.

One of the first licensed drivers in the city, he was keen on promoting the city as a tourist destination and making it easier to get around town. Prior to this, in 1910, Todd established the Todd Medal to be awarded to the first people to drive across Canada. A British travel writer, Thomas Wilby, and driver and mechanic Jack Haney attempted the trip in a Reo Motor Car Company vehicle departing Halifax, Nova Scotia in August 1912. They were unable to follow the rules which stipulated the trip had to be coast to coast and the vehicle not use boat or rail at any point. The medal was eventually given to a decorated Canadian soldier, Brigadier Robert Alexander MacFarlane, in 1946.

During his time in office he envisioned a crossing over the harbour to the west side (which later became the Johnson Street Bridge), saw through the installation of the now iconic cluster of street lights around the downtown area and promoted the Malahat Drive. He died at the age of 50 in 1928.
