= Marianne Alto =

Canadian politician

Her Worship Marianne Alto

Mayor of Victoria
- Incumbent
- Assumed office November 3, 2022
- Preceded by: Lisa Helps
- Website: www.electalto.ca

Marianne Alto is a Canadian politician, who has served as mayor of Victoria, British Columbia since November 3, 2022.

She was first elected to Victoria City Council in a by-election in November 2010, following the resignation of Sonya Chandler. The by-election took place on the same day as the city's referendum on the Johnson Street Bridge replacement project, which passed with 60 per cent support; Alto was the only candidate in the by-election who unequivocally supported the project. She was reelected to a full term on council in the 2011 British Columbia municipal elections, and served as chair of the council's housing committee. When the city's federal Member of Parliament Denise Savoie retired from politics in 2012, Alto was speculated as a potential New Democratic Party candidate in the resulting by-election, but declined to run.

Alto was reelected to council again in the 2014 British Columbia municipal elections. As one of the city's representatives to the Capital Regional District board, she was appointed chair of a special task force to work on improving municipal relations with local First Nations groups.

Alto was reelected to a third council term in the 2018 British Columbia municipal elections, but did not serve as a CRD board representative in her new term. She was elected mayor of the city in the 2022 British Columbia municipal elections, identifying housing issues in the city as one of her key priorities.

== Electoral record ==
=== 2026 Victoria municipal election: Mayor ===
Candidate	Votes	%	Elected
Alto, Marianne	13505	43.2%	✔
McGuigan, Bruce	10531	33.7%	
Harris, Mike	3518	11.2%	
Gervais-Harrison, Darren	1530	4.9%	
Miller, Gregoor	403	1.3%	
Hanna, Christopher	388	1.2%	
Johnston, David	243	0.8%	
Source: CivicInfo

=== 2022 Victoria municipal election: Mayor ===
Candidate	Votes	%	Elected
Alto, Marianne	15090	54.97%	✔
Andrew, Stephen	9775	35.61%	
Marshall, Brendan	1513	5.51%	
Fuentes, Rafael	206	0.75%	
Atkinson, Lyall	175	0.64%	
Graham, Rod	172	0.63%	
Johnston, David	154	0.56%	
Wiboltt, Michelle	97	0.35%	
Source: CivicInfo

=== 2018 Victoria municipal election: Council ===
Candidate	Incumbent	Votes	%	Elected
Isitt, Ben	✔	14205	47.82%	✔
Loveday, Jeremy	✔	13239	44.57%	✔
Collins, Laurel		12842	43.23%	✔
Young, Geoff	✔	12184	41.01%	✔
Potts, Sarah		11977	40.32%	✔
Thornton-Joe, Charlayne	✔	10678	35.94%	✔
Dubow, Sharmarke		10590	35.65%	✔
Alto, Marianne	✔	10245	34.49%	✔
Andrew, Stephen		9098	30.63%	
Madoff, Pam	✔	9067	30.52%	
Lore, Grace		8765	29.50%	
Reeve, Andrew		8246	27.76%	
Johal, Randie		7748	26.08%	
Alberts, Gary		7503	25.26%	
Gardiner, Marg		7041	23.70%	
King, Anna		5454	18.36%	
Henry, Rose		4076	13.72%	
Reichert, Jordan		3491	11.75%	
Archibald, Darlene		3083	10.38%	
Leitenberg, Sean		3059	10.30%	
Kahakauwila, Edison		1956	6.58%	
Smith, Ted		1898	6.39%	
Filipovic, Steve		1595	5.37%	
Godron, Riga		1567	5.27%	
Stewart, Doug		1394	4.69%	
Harasymow, James		1362	4.58%	
Jimenez, Jesse		1028	3.46%	
Tate, William		758	2.55%	
Martay, Delmar		238	0.80%	
Source: CivicInfo

=== 2014 Victoria municipal election: Council ===
Candidate	Incumbent	Votes	%	Elected
Isitt, Benjamin	✔	14729	59.72%	✔
Thornton-Joe, Charlayne	✔	12046	48.84%	✔
Alto, Marianne	✔	12016	48.72%	✔
Loveday, Jeremy		10852	44.00%	✔
Madoff, Pamela	✔	10354	41.98%	✔
Young, Geoff	✔	9934	40.28%	✔
Lucas, Margaret		8145	33.02%	✔
Coleman, Christopher	✔	8017	32.50%	✔
Kaye, Erik		7295	29.58%	
Luton, John		6850	27.77%	
Groos, Hilary		6653	26.97%	
Stephenson, Justin		5268	21.36%	
Reeve, Andrew		4336	17.58%	
Filipovic, Steve		3856	15.63%	
Hoar, Ian		3466	14.05%	
Servos, Paul		2577	10.45%	
Moen, Ryan		2108	8.55%	
Murray, Sean		1897	7.69%	
Carroll, Jonathan		1739	7.05%	
Olafson, Jeffrey		1693	6.86%	
MacKinnon, Gordon		1334	5.41%	
Andersen, Saul		1183	4.80%	
Stewart, John		1107	4.49%	
Harasymow, James		764	3.10%	
Source: CivicInfo

=== 2011 Victoria municipal election: Council ===
Candidate	Incumbent	Votes	%	Elected
Young, Geoff	✔	8940	51.83%	✔
Thornton-Joe, Charlayne	✔	8803	51.03%	✔
Helps, Lisa		8523	49.41%	✔
Isitt, Ben		8419	48.81%	✔
Alto, Marianne	✔	7493	43.44%	✔
Madoff, Pam	✔	7321	42.44%	✔
Gudgeon, Shellie		6904	40.03%	✔
Coleman, Christopher	✔	6793	39.38%	✔
Luton, John	✔	6343	36.77%	
Hunter, Lynn	✔	6101	35.37%	
Lucas, Philippe	✔	5719	33.16%	
Henry, Rose		4866	28.21%	
Lalli, Sukhi		3993	23.15%	
McGrew, Linda		3923	22.74%	
Hall, Aaron		2777	16.10%	
Turner, John		2014	11.68%	
Kimpton, Robin		1519	8.81%	
Andersen, Saul		1055	6.12%	
Murray, Sean		757	4.39%	
Valentine, Jon		682	3.95%	
Source: CivicInfo

=== 2010 Victoria municipal Byelection: Council ===
Candidate	Votes	%	Elected
Alto, Marianne	4529	29.43%	
Hobbis, Barry	3220	20.92%	
Filipovic, Barry	2280	14.82%	
Henry, Rose	1799	11.69%	
Woods, Susan	1361	8.84%	
Brown, Paul	1065	6.92%	
Anderson, Saul	331	2.15%	
Kruzel, Hugh	330	2.14%	
Sirk, George	299	1.94%	
Mora, Pedro J.	116	.75%	
Tumasonis, Rimas	59	.38%	
Total votes	15389		
Source: Times Colonist
