= Richard B. Wilson =

Canadian mayor

Mayor of Victoria, British Columbia
- In office 1961–1965
- Preceded by: Percy B. Scurrah
- Succeeded by: Alfred W. Toone

Personal details
- Born: February 25, 1904 Victoria, British Columbia
- Died: May 1, 1991 (aged 87) Victoria, British Columbia

Richard Biggerstaff Wilson (February 25, 1904 – May 1, 1991) was an entrepreneur and politician in British Columbia, Canada. He served as mayor of Victoria from 1961 to 1965.

The son of William Biggerstaff Wilson and Bertha Matilda Erb, he was born in 1904. He received a BComm from McGill University. Wilson was president of Wilson Motors Ltd. He was an officer in the army reserve during World War II. Wilson served as chancellor for the University of Victoria from 1967 to 1969. A student residence at the university was named in his honour.

He also served as president of the Victoria Community Chest and was vice-president of the board for the Royal Jubilee Hospital.

Wilson was named to the Order of Canada in 1978. He died in 1991, aged 87.

His grandfather William Wilson founded the retail clothing store W & J Wilson Ltd. and served in the province's legislative assembly.
