= Michael Young (Canadian politician) =

Canadian politician (1934–2010)

Mayor of Victoria, British Columbia
- In office 1975–1979
- Preceded by: Peter Pollen
- Succeeded by: William J. Tindall

Personal details
- Born: August 2, 1934 Glasgow, Scotland
- Died: January 11, 2010 (aged 75) Victoria, British Columbia
- Education: University of British Columbia

Michael Dalway Watson Young (August 2, 1934 – January 11, 2010) was a Scottish-born Canadian politician from British Columbia who was the mayor of Victoria, British Columbia from 1975 to 1979.

Born in Scotland in 1934, Young emigrated to Canada in 1948. He studied law at the University of British Columbia, graduating in 1961. In 1963 he joined Straith & Company, a Victoria-based law firm for which Young worked until his retirement in 1994. Young served two terms as city councillor before his election for mayor in 1975.

Young's involvement in public life further includes board positions with the British Columbia Heritage Trust, the British Columbia Ferry Corporation and the Parole Board of Canada. He was also a member of and local organizer for the Conservative Party of Canada.
