= Lumley Franklin =

Mayor of Victoria, British Columbia
- In office November 1865 – 1866
- Preceded by: Thomas Harris
- Succeeded by: William John Macdonald

Personal details
- Born: 1808 Liverpool, England
- Died: 3 August 1873 (aged 64–65) San Francisco, California, USA
- Occupation: Businessman, politician

Lumley Franklin (1808 – 3 August 1873) was the second mayor of Victoria, British Columbia. He was born in Liverpool, England, the son of a successful banker. Lumley emigrated from London to New York City in 1845 to establish his career in the U.S. He was a successful business man before he moved to San Francisco in 1854 to join his brothers Edward and Selim during the California gold rush. Lumley's cousins, Maurice and Lewis Franklin, had already left San Francisco to establish the Franklin House in San Diego, but frequently visited San Francisco.

Lumley stayed in California until 1858 when he and younger brother Selim (1814–1884) moved up to Victoria for the Fraser Canyon Gold Rush. In Victoria, Lumley and Selim established Franklin & Company, Auctioneers and Land Agents, at the foot of Yates Street. Because they were English citizens, they were appointed by Governor James Douglas as the first government auctioneers for British Columbia. Franklin & Company took out full page ads in the daily newspaper, The British Colonist, to advertise items up for auction which usually included properties in the area, furniture, cattle, books, photographs and carriages. In addition, the Franklins bought up properties around Victoria for their own ownership, including a cattle sale yard on Fort Street. One of Lumley's properties in the Seattle, Washington area became the subject of a US Supreme Court ruling in 1896: Hanford vs. Davies. (Note: http://supreme.justia.com/us/163/273/case.html)

Franklin achieved the title of Esquire and was a founding member of the Freemason lodge in Victoria. He was also a member of the grand jury that heard the trial of Tshuanahusset regarding the murder of William Robinson. In June 1867, Lumley was selected to the Board of Education of Vancouver Island along Dr. Powell (Chairman), David Higgins, Francis Garesche, and Thomas Wood.

Franklin Street in Victoria was named after Lumley Franklin. The Franklin River on Vancouver Island was named for his brother Selim.

== Mayor of Victoria ==
In November 1865 Lumley became the second mayor of Victoria, the same year his brother Selim left his seat on the Provincial Legislature. Lumley was nominated by the first mayor of Victoria, Thomas Harris. Lumley's opponent was Mr. Copland, who he defeated by a vote of 78 to 73. During his term in office, Franklin had the privilege of presiding over the installation of the telegraph cable linking Victoria directly to England. He received many congratulatory letters from other cities such as London, England and San Francisco on having Victoria connected via telegraph. He responded to each of these letters with a thank you note in return. Throughout his term Franklin was well liked and "urged to stand for re-election" by his fellow councillors and the general public. He declined the offer because he wanted to travel and enjoy his wealth.

== Composer and co-founder of Victoria Philharmonic Society ==
Shortly after arriving in Victoria, Lumley and Selim Franklin helped found the Victoria Philharmonic Society, both served as executives in the organization, and both sang in the musical performances. The Chairman of the Society was Chief-Justice Begbie, who sang opera. The Conductor was Chief of Police John Bayley. Other founders included Postmaster General Arthur Bushby, Alexander Main, Augustus Pemberton, A.C. Anderson, Joseph Porter, James Leigh, B.W. Pearse, and James Crowly.

Lumley is listed in a history of music in Victoria as the Composer/Mayor. According to The Knickerbocker Magazine in 1849, Lumley was involved in composer circles, including opera singer, director and composer Signor Giuseppe de Begnis of London and New York, and Thomas Moore of London. De Begnis described Lumley as being an excellent judge of music and possessing accomplished vocal skills, which given his credentials is a supreme compliment. De Begnis was a world-class opera singer who worked with Rossini in Italy and was married to the talented opera soprano Giuseppina Ronzi de Begnis (Claudine de Begnis). Signor De Begnis dedicated one of his works to Lumley before he died in New York in August 1849.

== Death and estate ==
Franklin enjoyed travelling, and frequently travelled by steamship down to San Francisco. It was on a journey down south to deal with his deceased brother's estate, Edward Franklin, that he suffered a severe stroke on July 11, 1873. He became paralysed and eventually died on August 3, 1873, in San Francisco at age 65.

His brother, Selim Franklin, was the executor of the estate, which was settled in San Francisco, California, as the place of Lumley's death. Lumley was most likely buried in Victoria, British Columbia.

Lumley Franklin's estate was divided up as follows:

- 1/10 – Sarah Franklin (sister)
- 1/20 – Maria Ashton (sister)
- 1/10 – P. Lewis of Naples (brother)
- 3/20 – David Lewis of London (brother)
- 5/20 – Selim (brother)
- 1/10 – Walter Lewis (brother)
- 3/20 – to the children of Frank (brother)
- 1/10 to Elise Reynolds (sister?) and her son, William.

== See also ==
- List of mayors of Victoria, British Columbia
- Governor James Douglas of BC
- Chief-Justice Begbie of BC
- Colony of Vancouver Island
- Colony of British Columbia (1866–1871)
- Cariboo Gold Rush
- Fraser Canyon Gold Rush
- Fort Victoria (British Columbia)
- Rock Creek Gold Rush
