= Alan Lowe =

Canadian politician

Mayor of Victoria, British Columbia
- In office November 20, 1999 – December 2, 2008
- Preceded by: Robert Cross
- Succeeded by: Dean Fortin

Personal details
- Born: July 26, 1961 (age 65) Victoria, British Columbia
- Education: University of Manitoba

Alan Lowe (born July 26, 1961) is a Canadian politician. He served as mayor of Victoria, British Columbia, 1999–2008.

== Education ==
In 1982 Lowe earned a bachelor's degree in environmental studies from the University of Manitoba, and in 1985 he earned a master's degree in architecture from the University of Oregon.

== Politics ==
Alan Lowe was the city's first mayor of Chinese heritage to be elected. At 38 years old he was also one of the youngest candidates ever to win Victoria's mayoral election.

In 1999 Alan Lowe managed to win a hard-fought three-way race versus Bob Friedland of the Victoria Civic Electors on the left and veteran right wing councilor Geoff Young. His campaign slogan was "Aim High, Vote Lowe".

=== 1999 Election Results ===
- Alan LOWE 7,080 43.59%
- Bob FRIEDLAND 5,626 34.64%
- Geoff YOUNG 3,076 18.94%

The accepted opinion in the next election was that Lowe was unassailable and therefore no serious candidates chose to challenge him. He handily won the 2002 election (61.65% of the popular vote) against a number of opponents, including his closest contender, Ben Isitt, then a 24-year-old master's student at the University of Victoria.

Alan Lowe won re-election in the 2005 elections. He again faced Ben Isitt and defeated him by 1,400 votes. Lowe's completion of the new police headquarters building and the Save On Foods Memorial Centre were very positive for his public relations. The arena project was not finished under the tenure of his predecessor mayor, Robert "Bob" Cross, former owner of Cross Meat Market.

In the December 5, 2007, edition of the Victoria Times Colonist newspaper, Lowe stated that he would like to spend more time with his family, friends, other interests and would not seek re-election. He served on Victoria City Council for 15 years as a councillor and mayor.

== See also ==
- List of mayors of Victoria, British Columbia
