= Alex Stuart =

Alex Stuart may refer to:

- Alex Stuart (writer), pseudonym used by the writer Violet Stuart (1914–1986)
- Alex Stuart (footballer) (born 1941), Scottish former footballer
- Alex Verrijn Stuart (1922–2004), Dutch computer scientist

== See also ==
- Alexander Stuart (disambiguation)
- Alex Stewart (disambiguation)
- Alexander Stewart (disambiguation)
