= Lisa Helps =

Canadian politician

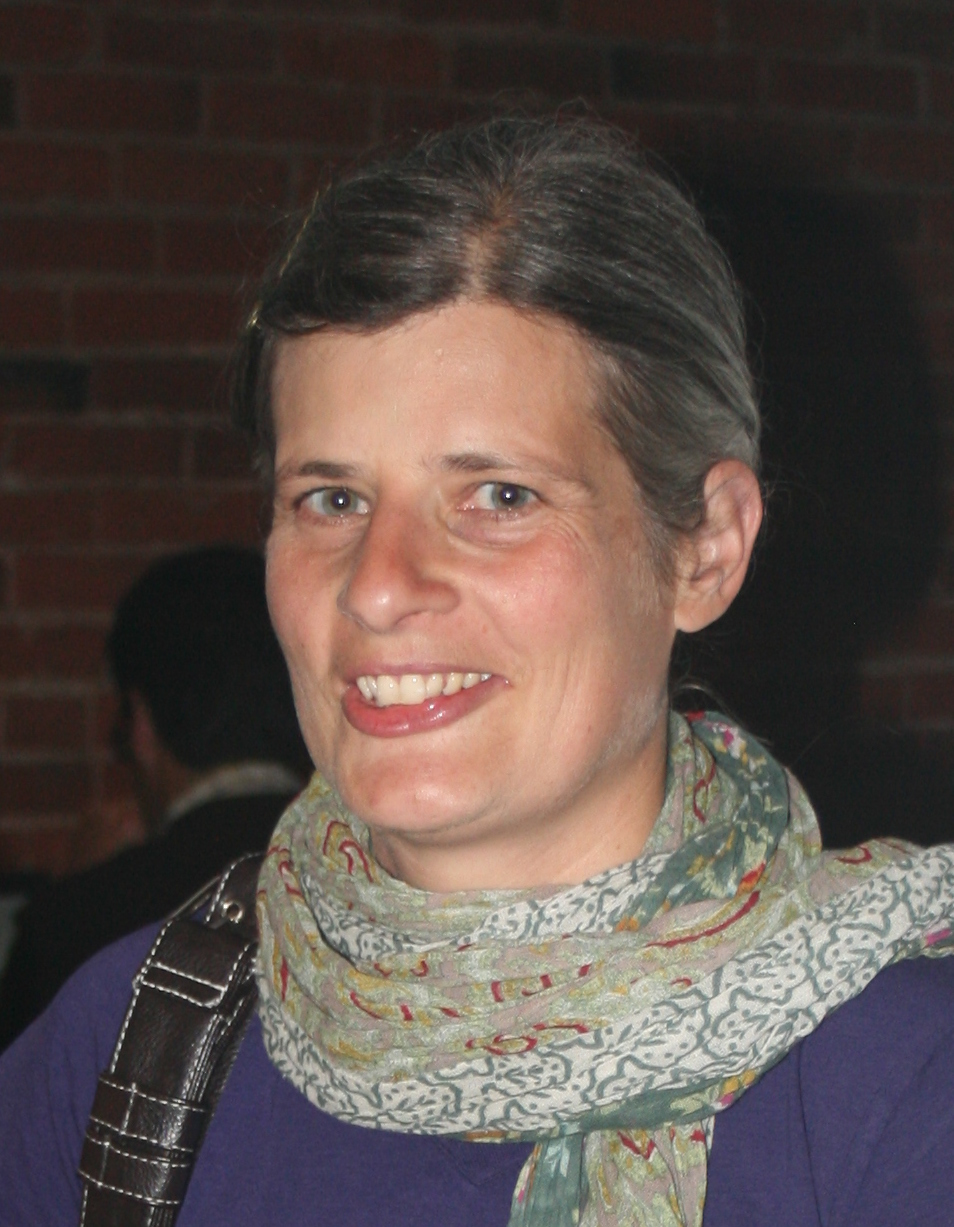

Mayor of Victoria
- In office December 4, 2014 – November 3, 2022
- Preceded by: Dean Fortin
- Succeeded by: Marianne Alto

Personal details
- Born: April 6, 1976 (age 50) London, Ontario
- Website: www.lisahelpsvictoria.ca

Lisa Helps (born April 6, 1976) is a Canadian politician, formerly the mayor of Victoria, British Columbia, with her inauguration taking place on December 4, 2014. She narrowly defeated incumbent mayor Dean Fortin in the 2014 municipal election. At the time, she was the second woman, after Gretchen Brewin, to be elected mayor of the city.

Helps did not run for a third term in office in the 2022 British Columbia municipal elections, and was succeeded as mayor by Marianne Alto.

== Career ==
Helps was first elected to Victoria City Council as a city councillor in the 2011 municipal election. She has also worked as a community organizer and activist, including time in the role of executive director of a community microlending program. Her mayoral campaign revolved heavily around a proposal to launch a more ambitious plan to deal with the issues of homelessness and affordable housing in the city and was also boosted by voter frustration over delays in the Johnson Street Bridge construction project and a controversial sewage treatment plan that has been a dominant issue in the city's municipal politics for several years.

At her inauguration ceremony as mayor, held on December 4, Helps declined to recite the traditional, though not legally required, oath of allegiance to Queen Elizabeth II, the Canadian monarch, explaining she does not hold any ideology against the Queen, but wanted to emphasise her opinion that Victoria is part of Songhees and Esquimalt territory. Helps was criticized by monarchists.

In June 2017, the city of Victoria created the Witness Reconciliation Program and the City Family. The latter is a group composed of Mayor Helps, several Victoria city council members, and people appointed by the Esquimalt and Songhees Nations' Councils. The City Family's objectives are to guide Victoria on how the city can respond to the Truth and Reconciliation Commission (TRC)'s five calls to action intended for municipalities, and also to realize the TRC's awareness mandate on a local scale and to promote reconciliation in general.

Helps oversaw the removal of the city's statue of John A. Macdonald from the front of Victoria City Hall, which took place three days after the city council voted for it on August 8, 2018. The decision was taken after one year of consultation and the support of the City Family.

Helps was re-elected to a second term as mayor of Victoria in the 2018 municipal election.

In 2021, Helps spearheaded the cancellation of Canada Day celebrations after the mayor and council concluded that marking the day would be damaging, citing "The history of our country’s genocidal relationship with First Nations".

Helps, who is queer, has also written poetry, and read several of her poems at Wilde About Sappho, a reading event for LGBTQ writers that was held in 2019 to celebrate the 1969 decriminalization of homosexuality in Canada. Helps made a public statement of support for a local cafe while wearing a drag king look in June 2022, after the restaurant was forced to cancel a drag show due to threats of homophobic violence.
