= Stewart Alexander (disambiguation) =

Stewart Alexander (born 1951) is an American politician.

Stewart Alexander may also refer to:

- Stewart Francis Alexander (1914–1991), American doctor and expert on chemical warfare
- Skip Alexander (1918–1997), American professional golfer
- Stewart Alexander (actor) in Renaissance of the Daleks

== See also ==
- Stuart Alexander (disambiguation)
- Alexander Stewart (disambiguation)
