= William Dalby (politician) =

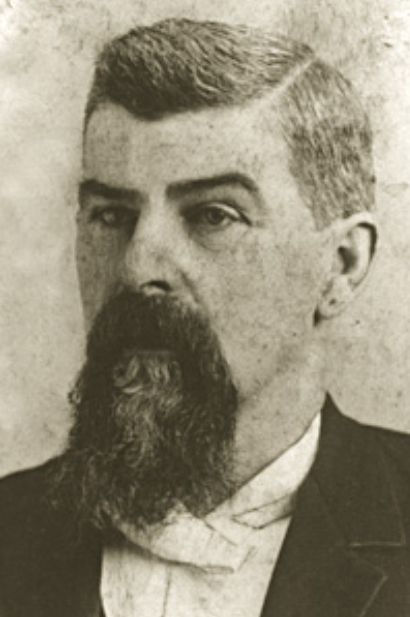
William Dalby, Mayor of Victoria

William Dalby (January 28, 1839 – January 22, 1916) was a merchant, real estate agent, insurance agent, and a political figure in British Columbia, Canada.

== Biography ==
He was born in Richmond Hill, Upper Canada and came to Victoria with merchant John Grant in 1862, later Mayor of Victoria. Dalby established a tannery and manufacturing business there. He was a justice of the peace and president of the Agricultural Association. Dalby was a Grand Master in the Masonic lodge of British Columbia. He was married twice: to Sarah Jane Robinson Moody, the sister of Sewell Moody, in 1866 and to Susan Netherby in 1889. In 1893 he was a member of the firm of Dalby and Claxton, Financial and Cannery Agents, at 64 Yates St. He died at home in Victoria at the age of 76. His son married a cousin of chief trader James Murray Yale and Major George Henry Yale.

== Political history ==
He was mayor of Victoria, British Columbia from April 15, 1873 when he was selected to replace mayor James D. Robinson to 1875. Dalby was also an unsuccessful candidate for a seat in the provincial legislature in 1871 and in 1890.
