= Selim Franklin =

Canadian politician

Selim Franklin, Esquire (1814–1885) was an American pioneer, auctioneer, real estate agent, chess master, and Canadian legislator. Selim is listed in the Pioneer Club of San Francisco and The Society of California Pioneers. Franklin Street in San Francisco is most likely named for him.

Born in Liverpool into an English-Jewish family, he was a son of Lewis Franklin, a Liverpool banker, and Miriam Abraham. He emigrated from England to San Francisco for the California Gold Rush in October 1849. He was joined by brother Edward and cousins Lewis and Maurice Franklin. Another brother Lumley Franklin arrived in 1854. In 1850 Selim and Edward Franklin ran a zinc-front store on Clay Street Wharf selling mining equipment and supplies. In 1851 they established Selim & Edward Franklin Real Estate and Auctioneers on 77 Battery Street near Long Wharf. Advertisements of properties appeared in The Daily Alta California newspaper. In 1854 they relocated to 102 Merchant Street between Montgomery and Kearny.

Selim and brother Edward built the Franklin House at 203-205 Sansome in 1852. The Annals of San Francisco (1855) lists the Franklin House as one of five more upscale hotels in the city. Permanent residents included physicians, attorneys and a judge. Cousins Lewis and Maurice Franklin relocated to San Diego and built the Franklin House there in 1855, the first three-story building in Southern California.

In 1858 he moved to Victoria, British Columbia, with his brother Lumley Franklin and opened Franklin & Company, Auctioneers and Land Agents on Yates Street. Franklin & Company ran full-page ads in the daily newspaper, The British Colonist, to list items for auction: real estate, furniture, cattle, and vehicles. Because they were British-born, they were appointed by Governor James Douglas as the first government auctioneers in Victoria and British Columbia. Selim was an advisor to Queen Victoria in the 1859 Oregon boundary dispute over the San Juan Islands.

In 1859 Selim was elected to the Legislature of British Columbia, becoming the first Jew to take a seat in any legislature in British North America, excluding Ezekiel Hart. He achieved the title of Esquire and was a founding member of the Freemason lodge in Victoria. Franklin was Chairman of the Vancouver Island Exploring Expedition of 1864. The Franklin River on Vancouver Island is named for him. Selim and brother Lumley were founders and executive members of the Victoria Philharmonic Society.

After resigning from the British Columbia Legislature in 1866, he returned to San Francisco. In 1879 he was listed as a Trustee of the Mineral Fork Mining and Silver Company (Utah), listed on the Pacific Stock Exchange. In 1881, Scientific American listed Franklin as a Trustee of the Geographical Society of the Pacific, based in San Francisco. Selim died sometime after May 1885, most likely from injuries sustained after falling down the stairs in his home.

Of the five Franklin cousins that came to San Francisco during the Gold Rush, only Selim lived to see nephew Selim Maurice Franklin graduate from University of California Law School in 1883. Edward died in Martinez, California, in 1873. Lumley died in San Francisco later in 1873 while taking care of his brother Edward's estate. Maurice died in San Francisco in 1874 while seeking medical care there. Lewis died in London in 1879. Nephew Selim M. Franklin was elected to the Arizona Legislature in 1884 and later became a founder of the University of Arizona.

== Chess Master ==
Selim Franklin was a world-ranked chess player from the renowned chess clubs in London, especially the Westminster Chess Club and Simpson's Divan Chess Room. In 1857 he was on the Planning & Rules Committee for the first American Chess Congress held in New York, which propelled 20-year-old American Paul Morphy into an international chess celebrity overnight. Franklin was President of the California Chess Congress. After this victory one system of rating historical chess players ranks him as 108th in the world.

Franklin participated in several London chess matches from 1868–1871. His last high-profile match was against chess master Johannes Zukertort in San Francisco at the Mechanics' Institute Chess Room in 1884. Zukertort played Wilhelm Steinitz in the World Chess Championship 1886.
