= Hugh R. Stephen =

Canadian politician (1913–2002)

Hugh Stephen

Mayor of Victoria, British Columbia
- In office 1969–1971
- Preceded by: Alfred W. Toone
- Succeeded by: Courtney J. Haddock

Personal details
- Born: April 25, 1913 Guildford, England
- Died: March 22, 2002 (aged 88) Victoria, British Columbia, Canada

Hugh Roulston Stephen (April 25, 1913 – March 22, 2002) was mayor of Victoria, British Columbia, Canada from 1967 to 1969.

Born in Guildford, England, Stephen immigrated to Canada with his mother Margaret, father Sam, and brother John, arriving in Victoria in the late 1930s. Following a cross-Atlantic proposal, Barbara joined Hugh in Victoria, marrying in 1942. They have three children, Michael, Susan and David, and six grandchildren all living in Canada. After six years in the Canadian Army, including a stint with Southeast Asia Command, Hugh entered business in 1946 as owner-manager of New Method Laundries, which he sold in 1963. After a year as alderman, in 1966 Hugh was elected mayor of Victoria, serving in that capacity to 1969. He served on the boards of numerous business and community organizations, including the University of Victoria (where a building was named after him) as past chairman, BC Tel, Home Oil, Canada Trust and Brentwood College. He also served at the Victoria Chamber of Commerce as past president.
