= Percy B. Scurrah =

Percy Scurrah

Mayor of Victoria, British Columbia
- In office 1955–1961
- Preceded by: Claude L. Harrison
- Succeeded by: Richard B. Wilson

Personal details
- Born: June 17, 1883 Brechin, Ontario
- Died: July 14, 1970 (aged 87) Victoria, British Columbia

Percy Beall Scurrah (June 17, 1883 – July 14, 1970) was mayor of Victoria, British Columbia, Canada from 1955 to 1961. He was the first mayor to have three consecutive terms. He is responsible for bringing the BC Ferries to Victoria - prior to that, the only service to the mainland (Vancouver) was through the CPR ferry through Nanaimo. He was born in Brechin, Ontario.

== Mayoral achievements ==
Aside from pulling Victoria out of a budget deficit, was the replacement of the "shaky" Point Ellice Bridge, and development of today's Centennial Square, commemorating the city's 100th birthday in January 1962.

== Private life ==
Scurrah attended Hillcrest Academy in Ontario for his early education and later went to Queen's University in Kingston. He married Mabel Dynes in 1914, and for 65 years they resided at what became known as “The Scurrah House” at "19 King George Terrace" in Oak Bay, where he enjoyed gardening. (The house is now owned by the wife of an American diplomat, Mrs. Joan Dale.)

== Business ==
Mayor Scurrah also owned Scurrah's, Ltd., selling quality dresses, coats, suits and sportswear at 728-730 Yates Street, a landmark in Victoria until it closed in 1962.

== Rotary ==
Scurrah was a Rotarian and he served as Rotary Club President, Northwest District Governor and International Director in Canada. He was also director of the Victoria Chamber of Commerce, and Chairman of the retail merchants association.

Scurrah died in 1970 at the Royal Jubilee Hospital at the age of 87. He has the honour of being called "one of Victoria's greatest citizens".
