= Andrew McGavin =

Andrew Ingram McGavin (January 31, 1879 – April 18, 1946) was a Canadian politician and was the mayor of Victoria, British Columbia from 1936 to 1944. He was born in Glasgow, Scotland and he died in Victoria.
