= Joseph Carey (Canadian politician) =

Mayor of Victoria, British Columbia
- In office 1883–1884
- Preceded by: Charles Redfern
- Succeeded by: Robert Rithet

Personal details
- Born: Joseph Westrop Carey c. 1829 Aghabullogue, County Cork, Ireland
- Died: 28 April 1910 (age 81) Victoria, British Columbia
- Spouse: Caroline Louisa Slater (m. 1852; died 1899)
- Occupation: Land surveyor, farmer

Joseph Westrop Carey (c. 1829 – 28 April 1910) was an Anglo-Irish Canadian land surveyor and pioneer, who served as mayor of Victoria, British Columbia in 1883 and 1884.

== Biography ==
Carey was born into a Protestant family in Aghabullogue, County Cork in 1829 or 1830, the son of British Army officer William Westrop Carey (also spelled Westrope or Westropp) and Honora van Stone Carey (née Collins). His father was an officer in the Duke of Wellington's Regiment and served in Egypt during the Napoleonic Wars. Joseph Carey arrived at Fort Victoria.

Carey was educated in Aghabullogue, learning land surveying. In April 1849, at age 15, he left Ireland without his family, a few months before the onset of the Great Famine. He travelled first to England before arriving in Boston in July. He went to the Pacific Coast where for 18 months he worked surveying the California-Arizona border. As a contractor, he conducted field work for Robert C. Matthewson, deputy surveyor for the U.S. federal government, and worked in Mexico and Baja California. After the onset of the 1849 Gold Rush, he went north to San Francisco to pan for gold in the mountains. He met some success but continued to work as a surveyor up and down the West Coast. He arrived at Fort Victoria on 11 May 1859, just over a decade after leaving Ireland. While employed as a police officer in Victoria, Carey was tried for the attempted rape of an Indigenous woman, but was acquitted by an all-white jury.

In 1870, Carey bought land in the Colquitz Valley, where he raised cattle and pigs and planted 600 fruit trees. Carey Road in Victoria, located on the spot of his ranch, bears his name.

== Politics ==
Carey was elected to Victoria's city council in 1865, and re-elected in 1869, 1870 and 1871.

Carey was elected mayor of Victoria in 1883. During his mayoralty, sheriff James MacMillan entered city hall in 1884, seizing city property, including petty cash and councillors' office furnishings, after Carey refused to pay an $870 legal bill owed by the city. The seized furnishings and equipment were placed for public auction, which ended when Daily Colonist editor David Higgins and private citizen Joseph Spratt paid the outstanding bill.

He was defeated in the next municipal election. He subsequently returned to his work as a surveyor, and also owned several properties in downtown Victoria, one of which was in operation for several years as a brothel.

== Family and children ==
In 1852 in Boston, he married Englishwoman Caroline Louise Slater, the daughter of Methodist minister Rev. Thomas Slater. Caroline, who had emigrated from Derbyshire, stayed in Boston while Carey returned to the Pacific Coast. She eventually joined him in 1859 and became a well-known pioneer woman.

They had two sons Joseph William Carey and Colonel Herbert Clement Carey CMG (1865-1948).
