= William D. Tindall =

Canadian politician

Mayor of Victoria, British Columbia
- In office 1979–1981
- Preceded by: Michael Young
- Succeeded by: Peter Pollen

Personal details
- Born: May 29, 1921 Treherne, Manitoba
- Died: April 9, 2004 (aged 82) Saanichton, British Columbia

William David Tindall (May 29, 1921 – April 9, 2004) was a Canadian politician, who served as mayor of Victoria, British Columbia from 1979 to 1981. He was a veteran of World War II, serving in the Royal Canadian Air Force. Tindall was also an alderman on the Victoria City Council from 1971 until his election as mayor. He also worked as a manager at Eaton's.
