= Sandy Stewart (coach) =

American volleyball coach

Personal information
- Nationality: American

Coaching information
Previous teams coached
Years	Teams
1982–1988	Iowa Hawkeyes

Sandy Stewart was an American college volleyball coach. She coached the Iowa Hawkeyes from 1982 to 1988.

== Career ==
=== Iowa ===
Sandy Stewart only received an interview from one university, the University of Iowa. She coached the Iowa Hawkeyes women's volleyball team from 1982-1988.

In Stewart's first season in 1982, the team finished with a 9-22 record. In 1983, her team finished with a record of 22-9 and she was the Big Ten Coach of the Year. They finished second in the conference, which was the highest ever for the team.

Stewart kept her team on an alcohol- and sugar-free diet.

Stewart started the 1986 season optimistic that the team could win a Big Ten championship. The team finished the 1986 season third in the Big Ten Conference with a record of 12-6. She signed four recruits for the 1987 season.

Stewart resigned in 1989, citing the need for a career change. She said that "I felt good about what I've done here, but I just know I have to move to something different." She also said the hardest part of quitting was telling her recruits. She finished her seven career with a record of 136-102.

== Head coaching career ==
Record table
Season	Team	Overall	Conference	Standing	Postseason
Iowa Hawkeyes (The Big Ten Conference) (1982–1988)
1982	Iowa Hawkeyes	10-22	5-10	Tied 6th	
1983	Iowa Hawkeyes	22-9	9-7	Tied 3rd	
1984	Iowa Hawkeyes	25-16	9-5	Tied 3rd	
1985	Iowa Hawkeyes	13-21	7-11	7th	
1986	Iowa Hawkeyes	25-9	12-6	3rd	
1987	Iowa Hawkeyes	17-14	9-9	Tied 5th	
1988	Iowa Hawkeyes	24-10	11-7	2nd	
Iowa Hawkeyes:		136-102 (.571)	62-55		
Total:		136-102			
National champion Postseason invitational champion Conference regular season champion Conference regular season and conference tournament champion Division regular season champion Division regular season and conference tournament champion Conference tournament champion
