= John Carl Pendray =

Canadian industrialist and politician

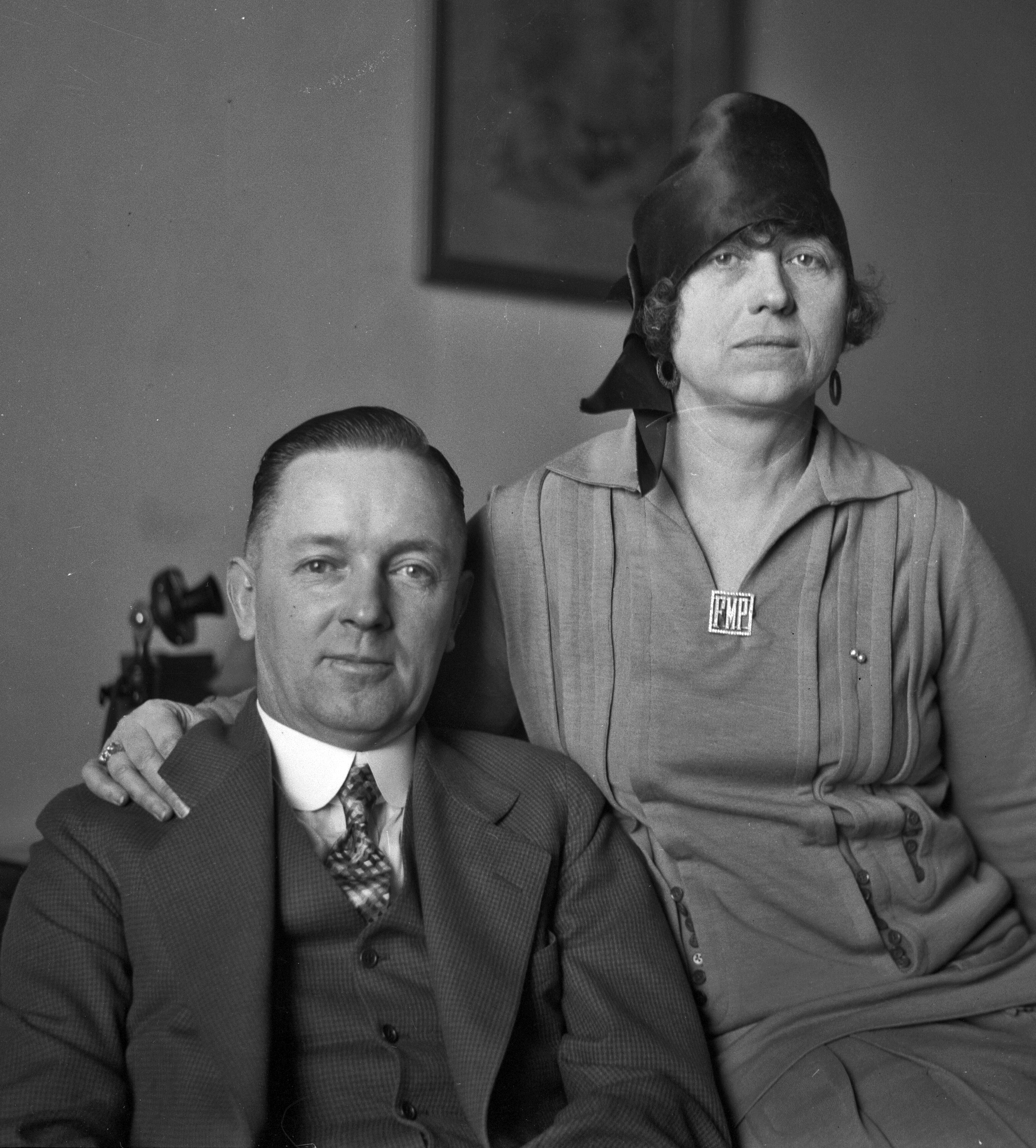
Pendray and his wife Florence, 1928

John Carl Pendray (born Victoria, British Columbia November 17, 1879 – 1961) was an industrialist and politician in British Columbia, Canada. He served as mayor of Victoria from 1924 to 1928.

The son of local businessman William Joseph Pendray (owner of British America Soap Company) and Amelia Jane Carthew, Pendray served as managing director of the family firm, the British America Paint Company, from 1908 to 1938. Pendray founded the Victoria & Island Publicity Bureau. He was a partner in the first car ferry operation providing service to Victoria, which was established in 1922. Pendray was also a director of the Canadian Highway Association, and served as vice-president of the National Paint, Varnish and Lacquer Association of North America.
