= Victoria City Council =

Governing body of the city of Victoria, Canada

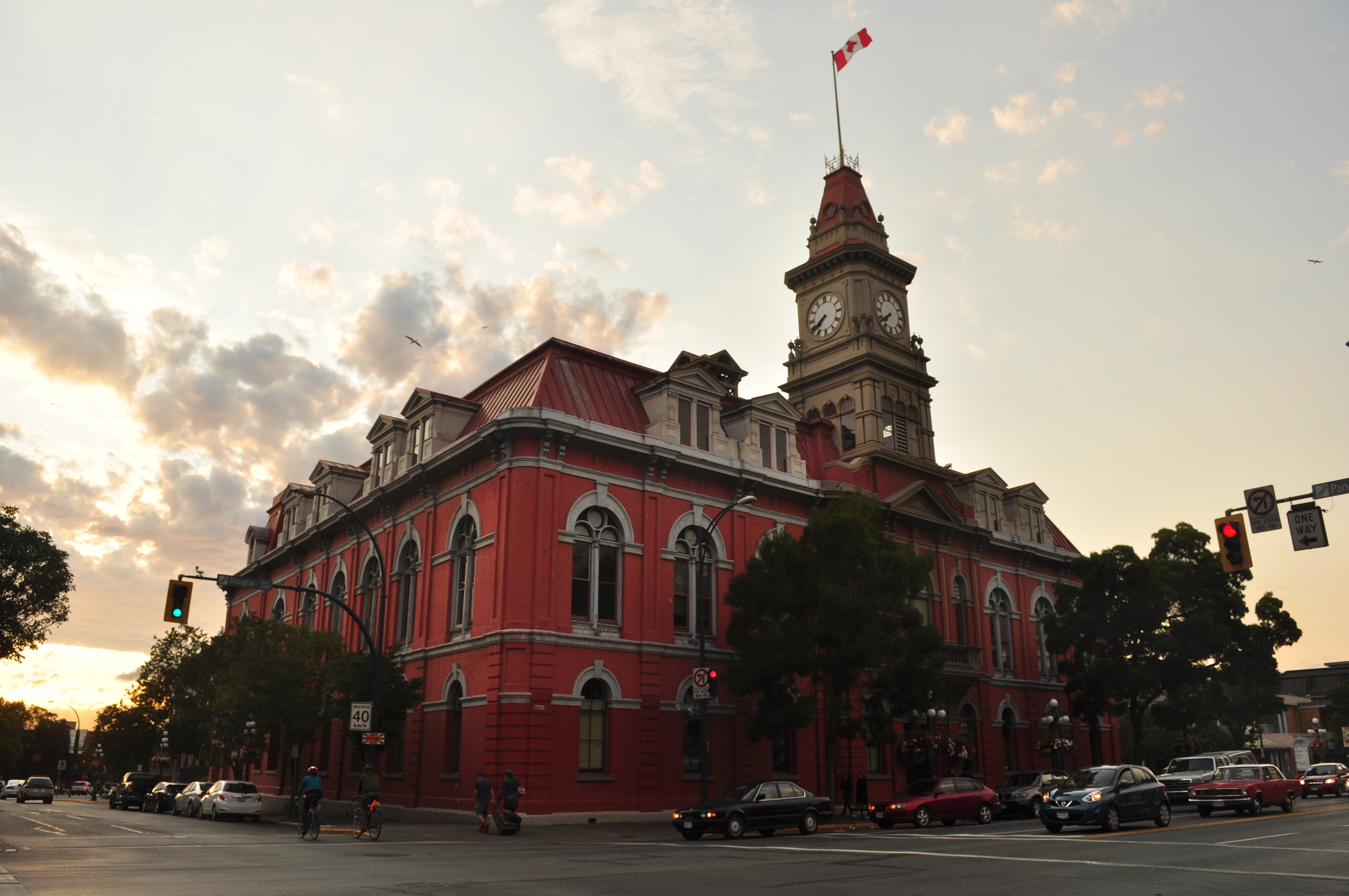
Victoria, BC City Hall, where the City Council meets

Victoria City Council is the governing body of the City of Victoria, British Columbia, Canada.

The council consists of the mayor plus eight councillors. A deputy mayor is appointed monthly.

The councillors are councillors-at-large elected for the entire city.

Municipal elections are held every four years across the Province on the third Saturday of October.

The current election is being held on October 17, 2026.

== Structure ==
The Victoria City Council consists of eight councillors, elected at large, and the mayor. While councillors are elected on an at-large basis, each councillor acts as a Neighbourhood Liaison. As Victoria has 12 neighbourhoods, certain councillors represent more than one neighbourhood each.

Municipal elections in Victoria take place simultaneously with regularly scheduled municipal elections across the province, occurring on the third Saturday of October every four years. If there is a vacancy on Council, a by-election may be held to fill the position for the remainder of the term.

== Victoria City Council members ==
=== Current (2026-2030) ===
Party	Name	Position
Independent	Marianne Alto	Mayor
Independent	Wendy Bowkett	Councillor
Independent	Jeremy Caradonna	Councillor
Independent	Melissa Cseszko	Councillor
Independent	Matt Dell	Councillor
Independent	Stephen Hammond	Councillor
Independent	Marg Gardiner	Councillor
Independent	Jack Sandor	Councillor
Independent	Dave Thompson	Councillor

=== 2022–2026 ===
Party	Name	Position
Independent	Marianne Alto	Mayor
Independent	Jeremy Caradonna	Councillor
Independent	Susan Kim	Councillor
Independent	Matt Dell	Councillor
Independent	Krista Loughton	Councillor
Independent	Dave Thompson	Councillor
Independent	Chris Coleman	Councillor
Independent	Stephen Hammond	Councillor
Independent	Marg Gardiner	Councillor

=== 2018–2022 ===
Party	Name	Position
Independent	Lisa Helps	Mayor
Independent	Marianne Alto	Councillor
Independent	Stephen Andrew	Councillor (since 2020)
Together Victoria	Laurel Collins	Councillor (until 2019)
Together Victoria	Sharmarke Dubow	Councillor
Independent	Ben Isitt	Councillor
Independent	Jeremy Loveday	Councillor
Together Victoria	Sarah Potts	Councillor
Independent	Charlayne Thornton-Joe	Councillor
Independent	Geoff Young	Councillor

=== 2014–2018 ===
Name	Position
Lisa Helps	Mayor
Benjamin Isitt	Councillor
Charlayne Thornton-Joe	Councillor
Marianne Alto	Councillor
Jeremy Loveday	Councillor
Pamela Madoff	Councillor
Geoff Young	Councillor
Margaret Lucas	Councillor
Christopher Coleman	Councillor

=== 2011–2014 ===
Name	Position
Dean Fortin	Mayor
Marianne Alto	Councillor
Chris Coleman	Councillor
Shellie Gudgeon	Councillor
Lisa Helps	Councillor
Ben Isitt	Councillor
Pamela Madoff	Councillor
Charlayne Thornton-Joe	Councillor
Geoff Young	Councillor

=== Previous ===
2008–2011
	Name	Position
Victoria Civic Electors	Dean Fortin	Mayor
	Charlayne Thornton-Joe	Councillor
Victoria Civic Electors	Pam Madoff	Councillor
Green	Sonya Chandler	Councillor (resigned 2010)
Victoria Civic Electors	Lynn Hunter	Councillor
	Geoff Young	Councillor
Green	Philippe Lucas	Councillor
	Chris Coleman	Councillor
	John Luton	Councillor
Victoria Civic Electors	Marianne Alto	Councillor (elected 2010)

2005–2008
Party	Name	Position
Independent	Alan Lowe	Mayor
Green	Sonya Chandler	Councillor
Independent	Chris Coleman	Councillor
Victoria Civic Electors	Dean Fortin	Councillor
Independent	Bea Holland	Councillor
Independent	Helen Hughes	Councillor
Victoria Civic Electors	Pamela Madoff	Councillor
Independent	Charlayne Thornton-Joe	Councillor
Independent	Geoff Young	Councillor

2002–2005
Party	Name	Position
Independent	Alan Lowe	Mayor
Independent	Helen Hughes	Councillor
Victoria Civic Electors	Rob Fleming	Councillor
Victoria Civic Electors	Denise Savoie	Councillor
Victoria Civic Electors	Pam Madoff	Councillor
Independent	Charlayne Thornton-Joe	Councillor
Independent	Chris Coleman	Councillor
Victoria Civic Electors	Dean Fortin	Councillor
Independent	Bea Holland	Councillor

1999–2002
Party	Name	Position
Independent	Alan Lowe	Mayor
Victoria Civic Electors	Rob Fleming	Councillor
Independent	Bea Holland	Councillor
Independent	Hellen Hughes	Councillor
Independent	Jane Lunt	Councillor
Victoria Civic Electors	Pamela Madoff	Councillor
Independent	David Mclean	Councillor
Victoria Civic Electors	Denise Savoie	Councillor
Green	Art Vanden Berg	Councillor

1996–1999
Party	Name	Position
Independent	Bob Cross	Mayor
Independent	Christopher Coleman	Councillor
Victoria Civic Electors	Bob Friedland	Councillor
Independent	Bea Holland	Councillor
Independent	Helen Hughes	Councillor
Independent	Jane Lunt	Councillor
Victoria Civic Electors	Pamela Madoff	Councillor
Victoria Civic Electors	David McLean	Councillor
Independent	Geoffrey Young	Councillor

1993–1996
Party	Name	Position
Independent	Bob Cross	Mayor
Independent	David McLean	Councillor
Victoria Civic Electors	Bob Friedland	Councillor
Independent	Geoff Young	Councillor
Independent	Alan Lowe	Councillor
Independent	Helen Hughes	Councillor
Victoria Civic Electors	Pamela Madoff	Councillor
Victoria Civic Electors	Laura Acton	Councillor
Victoria Civic Electors	David McLean	Councillor

1990–1993
Party	Name	Position
Victoria Civic Electors	David Turner	Mayor
Independent	Bob Cross	Councillor
Independent	Geoff Young	Councillor
Independent	Helen Hughes	Councillor
Independent	Martin Segger	Councillor
Victoria Civic Electors	Jan Greenwood	Councillor
Victoria Civic Electors	Alaistaire Craighead	Councillor
Victoria Civic Electors	Laura Acton	Councillor
Victoria Civic Electors	Allan Lowe	Councillor
