= Alexander C. Stuart =

American painter

Alexander C. Stuart (1831–1898) was a British-born American painter, specializing in naval scenes. He grew up in Glasgow, served in the British Army, and immigrated to US around 1861. Since then lived and worked on the East Coast of the United States. In the US he served in the Marines and the Navy (Union) until 1866; since then he worked as an artist and illustrator.

In the U.S., Stuart worked primarily on navy bases and shipyards near the Delaware River. He also worked quite a bit in Washington, Philadelphia, and New York. According to an account of his life written by Stuart, he had studied engineering and medicine before enlisting in the English Army in the Crimean War and the Indian Mutiny.

After resigning from the Navy, Stuart began working as an artist and illustrator for the merchant shipbuilding companies. His first employer was John Roach & Son in Chester, for whom he worked from 1872 to 1880. He later worked for Harlan & Hollingsworth in Wilmington, Delaware. During this period Stuart produced numerous illustrations of early iron steamships built by these firms. These images became valuable documentary sources for this era of shipbuilding in the U.S., giving Stuart's work added value.

In 1882, Stuart went to New York, seeking to earn a name and living as an artist in the city. This move did not prove successful. A year later, he moved to Florida. There, he first settled in St. Augustine and then moved to Eustis where he worked as a physician for nearly a year. In 1886, Stuart moved again to the Wilmington area and stayed there until 1895. From there he moved with his daughter to Camden, New Jersey. His financial condition in the final years of his life saw a decline, but he painted marine subjects until his death in 1898.

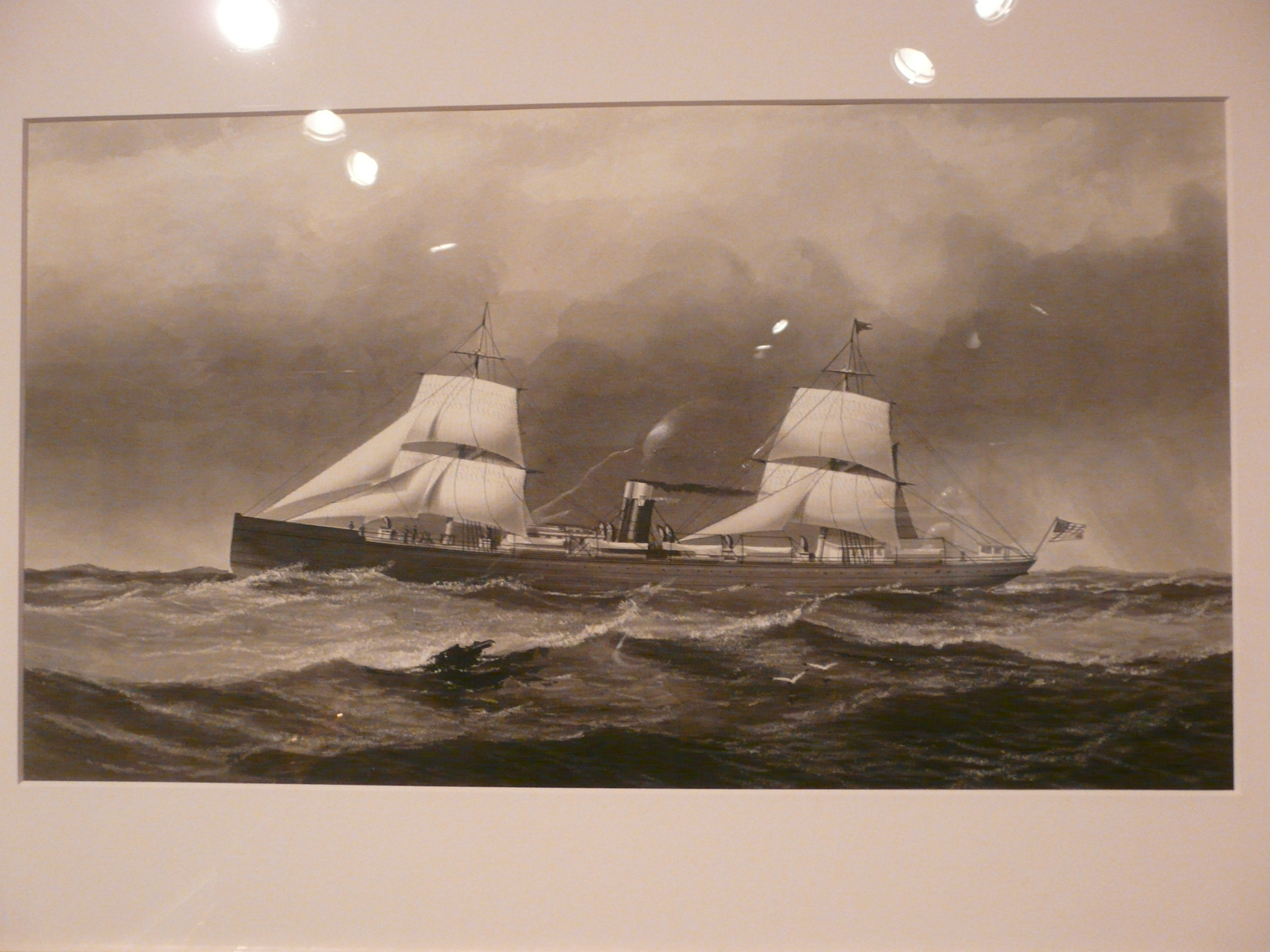
A sketch of Steamship Pennsylvania at the Independence Seaport Museum.

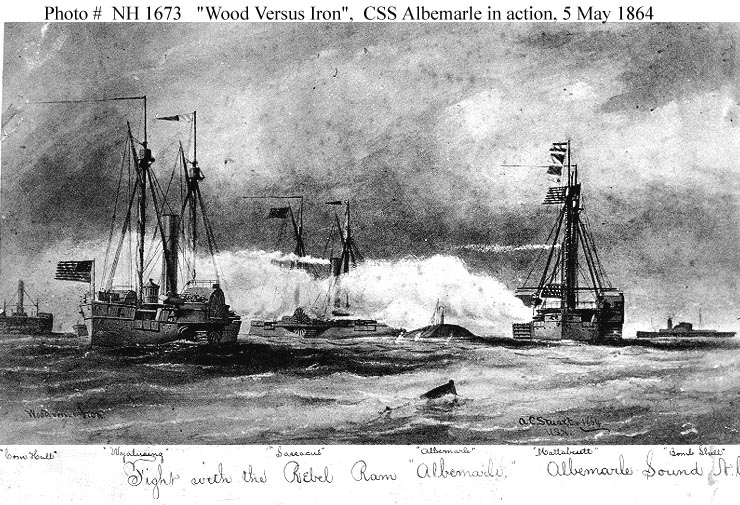
Stuart's drawing "Wood Versus Iron" depicting the naval encounter during the American Civil War that took place on 5 May 1864 in Albemarle Sound.

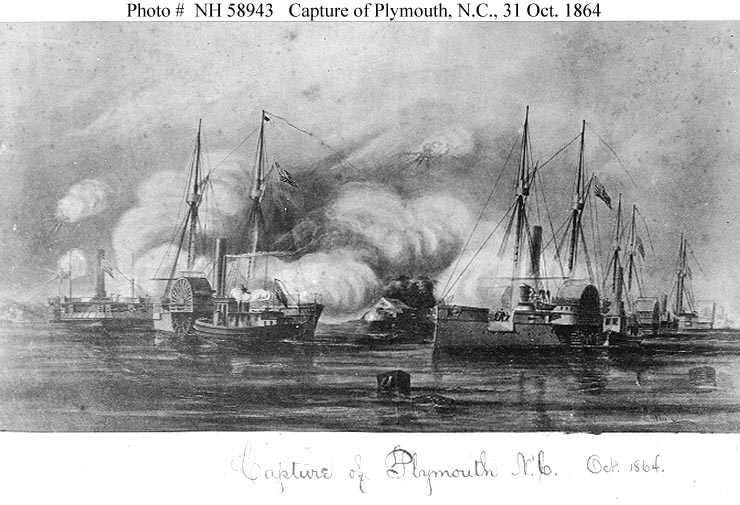
Stuart's drawing of a naval battle in Plymouth, North Carolina, on 31 October 1864.
