= James D. Robinson (politician) =

Canadian politician

James Dickie Robinson (October 21, 1840 – April 18, 1912) was a Canadian political figure who, in 1873, served from February 9 to April 15 as Mayor of Victoria, British Columbia. He was born in Ireland in 1840.

Robinson is referred to as the "mysterious missing mayor" because of the scarcity of archival information regarding his term, which is recorded as being the shortest in Victoria's history. He also served as the Town Clerk for Victoria from 1884 to 1888. He died in 1912 in Victoria.
