= Alexander Stewart Provincial Park =

Provincial park in Ontario, Canada

- IUCN category Ia (strict nature reserve)
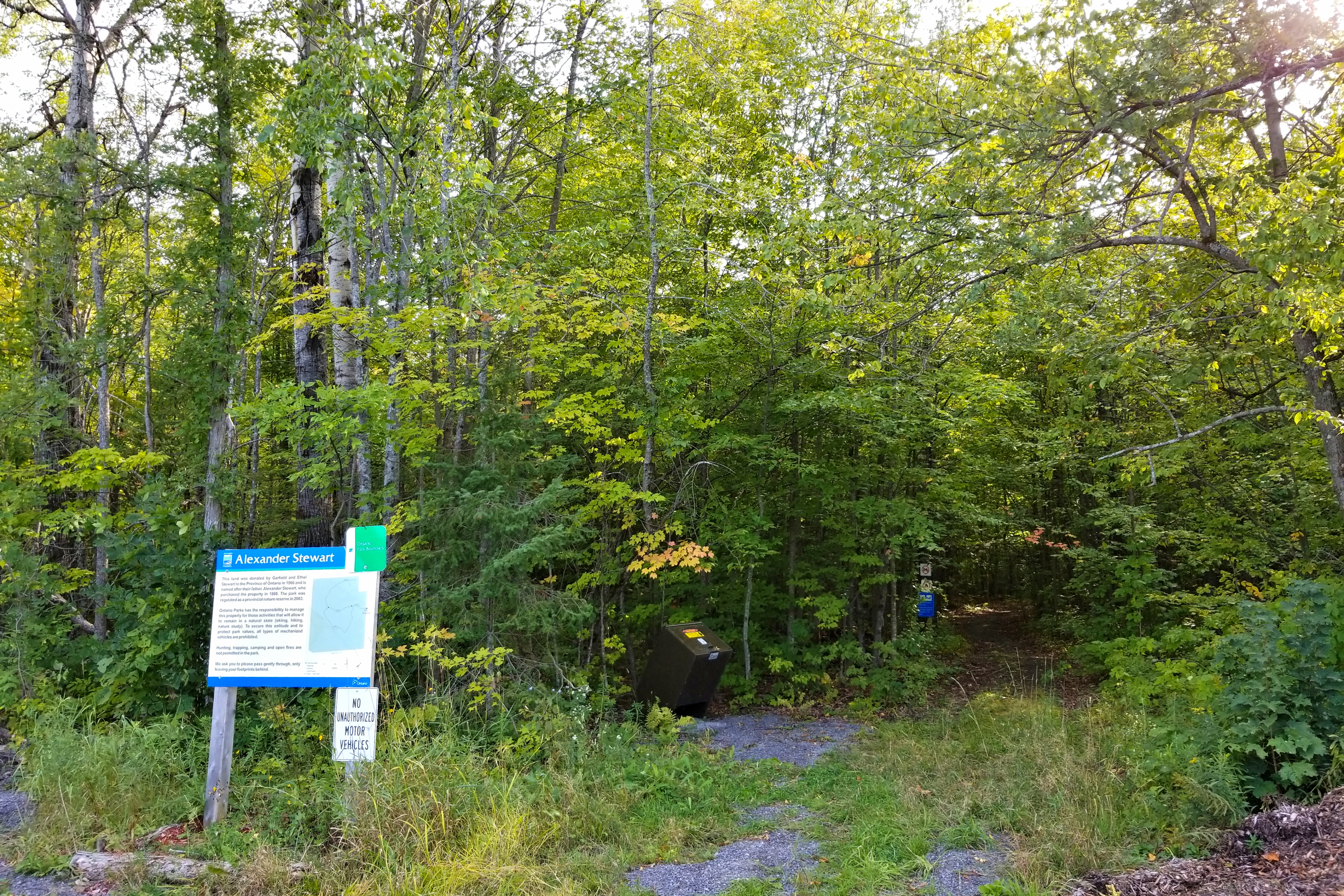

- Location within Southern Ontario
- Interactive map of Alexander Stewart Provincial Park
- Location: McNab/Braeside, Ontario, Canada
- Coordinates: 45°25′49″N 76°29′56″W
- Area: 30.0 ha (74 acres)
- Established: 2003
- Governing body: Ontario Parks
- Website: www.ontarioparks.com/nonoperating/alexanderstewart

Alexander Stewart Provincial Park is a nature reserve in McNab/Braeside, Renfrew County, Ontario, Canada, about 11 kilometres (7 mi) west of the centre of Arnprior. This nature reserve contains a hardwood forest of several species including maple, American beech, basswood, blue-beech, and bur oak. The subsurface is clay silt, a remnant of the ice age Champlain Sea. The site is at an elevation of 130 metres (430 ft).

The property was bought in 1860 by the eponymous Alexander Stewart, and donated by his children to the province in 1966.

The park, located at the northwest intersection of Maple Bend Road and Russett Drive, is a non-operating park, meaning there are no facilities or services.
