= Alexander Stuart (priest) =

Alexander Stuart was an Anglican priest in Ireland in the 19th century.

Stuart educated at Trinity College Dublin. He was the Incumbent at Bandon and Archdeacon of Ross from 1842 until 1883.
