= Dean Fortin =

Canadian politician

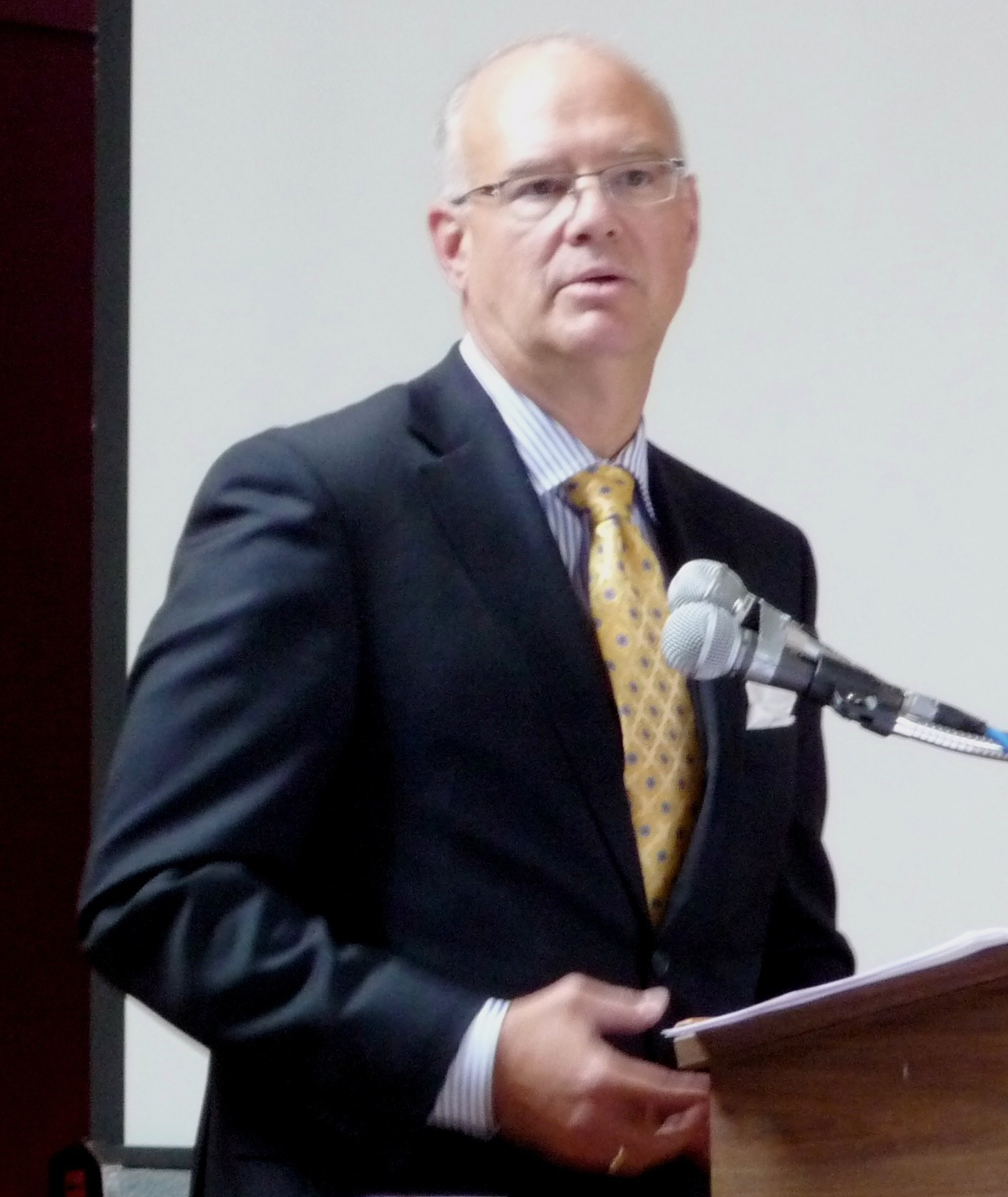
- Fortin in 2011

51st Mayor of Victoria, British Columbia
- In office December 2, 2008 – December 4, 2014
- Preceded by: Alan Lowe
- Succeeded by: Lisa Helps

Personal details
- Born: March 1, 1959 (age 67) Kamloops, British Columbia
- Education: University of Victoria
- Occupation: lawyer, executive director

Dean Fortin (born March 1, 1959) served as mayor of Victoria, British Columbia, from 2008 to 2014.

Dean Fortin was first elected to city council in 2002 and became the 51st Mayor of Victoria on November 15, 2008. He was sworn into office for a second term on December 8, 2011. He was defeated by Victoria city councillor Lisa Helps on November 15, 2014. In August 2015, he was named the executive director of Pacifica Housing.

Fortin was the executive director of the Burnside Gorge Community Association for 17 years before being elected Mayor. Previously, he helped establish and operate the Victoria Association for Street Kids for seven years. He has practiced as a lawyer in both Whitehorse and Victoria.

Fortin's priority was building affordable housing and tackling the issue of homelessness. Other priorities included encouraging sustainable development, enhancing downtown safety and vibrancy, and advancing a green transportation strategy.

Between 2015 and 2018 Fortin was the executive director of Pacifica Housing, a charitable organization that provides affordable housing to low-income families, persons with disabilities, and persons experiencing homelessness across South Vancouver Island. Pacifica is one of the largest affordable housing providers on Vancouver Island.

== Education ==
Dean Fortin first began his post secondary education in Kamloops, British Columbia at Thompson Rivers University (TRU), also known as Cariboo College at the time. He transferred from TRU in 1979 and in 2010 was recognized for being a distinguished alumni. He was awarded with the Public and Service to the Community Award for his commitment to the community.

Fortin transferred to the University of Victoria (UVIC) where he would later complete his Bachelor of Arts degree in geography. Subsequently, from his bachelor's degree, Fortin obtained a Master's degree in Education (Counselling and Public Administration) and he obtained an L.L.B (law), both at UVIC.

== Accomplishments ==
=== Affordable Housing and Homelessness ===
During the 2008–2011 term, affordable housing and homelessness was identified as a top priority. As a result, 447 units of affordable housing were created with City funding from 2008 -10. This includes 91 units within the Capital Region but outside of Victoria.

Highlights of the 2008-2010 Affordable Housing Initiatives:

- Two former motel properties (Travelers Inn) were purchased and being turned into supportive housing units.
- Over $1.5 million invested from the Housing Trust Fund in affordable housing initiatives in Victoria, creating 281 units of supportive housing, shelter space and rental housing for low income individuals and families.
- 124 secondary suites created since amending the secondary suite policy and introducing a grant incentive program of up to $5,000 for adding secondary suites in single family homes. This program received a FCM award for Excellence
- 11 new housing agreements that either limit restriction on rentals (in the case of strata projects) or create rental units and rent restrictions for a prescribed period of time. This protects 104 new units.
- A development permit was issued for the first purpose-built rental apartment building in almost 30 years in the city, creating 23 new rental units.
- Mayor Fortin was co-chair of the Greater Victoria Coalition to End Homelessness. The City provides an annual operating grant of $100,000 .
- Total number of people housed during this period throughout Greater Victoria was 1597. Includes everyone in Greater Victoria who moved into subsidized housing and/or receives a rent supplement.

=== Downtown Disorder ===
In 2009, Mayor Fortin launched a Task Force to address the growing social disorder in the downtown core. The task force was entitled "Late Night – Great Night" and addressed the issues of excessive intoxication and the associated vandalism, fighting and aggressive behaviour, crowded streets after bar closing time, noise, public urination, and a lack of coordinated late night transportation.

The Downtown Late Night Task Force consisted of Mayor Dean Fortin, Councillor Charlayne Thornton-Joe, and Chief Constable Jamie Graham of the Victoria Police Department. The task force members interviewed downtown business owners and workers, transportation providers, and security personnel. The task force also sought input from late night downtown users including students and youth.

The Task Force recommended and Council endorsed a variety of interventions, which led to the introduction of late night weekend public bus service and late night taxi stands with security. Bar Watch was introduced as well as dedicated weekend night police patrols in the downtown. The City introduced portable urinals, which were eventually replaced by permanent outside facilities.

Results of the task force show that calls for service downtown between Thursday evening and Sunday morning dropped by 26%, property crime in downtown Victoria was decreased 50%, and disturbances, drug offences and violent crimes decreased by 33%.

=== Bus Priority Lanes ===
Fortin and his council, in partnership with the BC Transit Commission, successfully introduced the first Priority Bus lanes in the Greater Victoria Transit System on Douglas Street in September 2014. The first phase opened introduced "Transit and Cycling priority lanes" from Fisgard Street to Hillside Avenue Monday through Friday from 6 a.m. to 9 a.m. southbound and from 3 p.m. to 6 p.m. northbound. A second phase of priority transit and cycling lanes from Hillside Avenue to Tolmie Avenue was begun in early 2015 and is due for completion in fall of 2015.

Cycling Master Plan

A cycling task force was established by Victoria Mayor Dean Fortin in 2013. The task force's goals were to update the 1995 Bicycle Master Plan and create a new comprehensive plan that took into account pedestrian and greenway needs. The task force was made up of Fortin along with councillors Marianne Alto and Ben Isitt.

The Task Force reported back in July 2014. About $5 million in cycling improvements were identified as priorities over a five years span, to be implemented in 2015. The priority projects included bike lanes that are separated from motor vehicle lanes. The priority list includes improvements on Pandora Avenue, Johnson Street, Vancouver Street and Wharf and Belleville streets.

=== Parks and Public Spaces Renewal ===
- David Foster Way
- Centennial "Spirit" Square
- Cook Street Playground
- Fishermans Wharf Park
- Chinatown Heavenly Lights
- Rose Garden in Beacon Hill Park

=== Other Accomplishments ===
Dean Fortin was the first Mayor in the City of Victoria to march in the Pride Parade, beginning in 2009. Mayor and Council participated every year since that time.

Mayor Fortin directly assisted in introducing the Victoria HarbourCats baseball team to Victoria in 2013. Located throughout the Pacific Northwest, the West Coast League is one of the premier collegiate summer leagues in the North America and is known as the "Diamond Standard" of summer collegiate baseball.

Mayor Fortin assisted in the reintroduction of the WHL to Victoria, with the establishment of the Victoria Royals in 2011.

== Challenges ==
Johnson Street Bridge

Occupy Victoria

As part of the larger Occupy movement, the City of Victoria was also a site of an encampment beginning October 15, 2011 and ending November 22, 2011. The end of the occupation was generally peaceful, one of the few such endings in North America.

Home Attack

The Mayor of Victoria's home was subjected to a vandalism attack on the evening of November 4, 2010. The letters ACAB, standing for All Cops Are Bastards, was scrawled in red paint on the back door of his white Honda. The back passenger window was also smashed out. Vandals also spray painted the number 72 and the letters PG in white lettering on his garage. The number 72 refers to the number of shelter beds that were reduced in the city because of new shelter and affordable housing projects. The money funding for the shelter mats was converted to funding rooms in one of the hotels the city had purchased as part of its homeless initiatives. PG stands for Pandora Green, the area of downtown Victoria frequented by the city's homeless, and the target of a city boulevard project that moved some tenters out.

== Other Positions Held ==
Co-chair, Coalition to End Homelessness 2009–2014

Greater Victoria Transit Commission 2009–2014

Chair, Victoria and Esquimalt Police Board 2008–2014

Executive Director, Pacifica Housing 2015-2018 - Pacifica Housing is one of the largest affordable housing providers in British Columbia. He combined his passion for tackling homelessness with his past experience as the executive director of Burnside Gorge Community Centre and the Youth Empowerment Society to raise the organization's profile during his tenure at the organization.

== Honours and awards ==
Honorary Citizen of Jiangsu Province (January 2013) - For his great contribution to the closer links between Jiangsu, China and Victoria, Canada

Queen Elizabeth II Diamond Jubilee Medal (2012)

Thompson Rivers University Distinguished Alumni: Public and Community Service Award (2010)

== See also ==
- List of mayors of Victoria, British Columbia
