= Alex Stewart (Australian footballer) =

Australian rules footballer, born 1908

Personal information
- Full name: Alex Stewart
- Born: 14 February 1908
- Died: 11 February 1993 (aged 84)
- Original team: Mordialloc
- Height: 180 cm (5 ft 11 in)
- Weight: 80 kg (176 lb)

Playing career^{1}
Years	Club	Games (Goals)
1931	Hawthorn	9 (1)
- ^{1} Playing statistics correct to the end of 1931.

Alex Stewart (14 February 1908 – 11 February 1993) was an Australian rules footballer who played for the Hawthorn Football Club in the Victorian Football League (VFL).
