= Fredericton (disambiguation) =

Fredericton is the capital city of New Brunswick, Canada.

Fredericton may also refer to:

- Fredericton (federal electoral district), in New Brunswick
- Fredericton (provincial electoral district), in New Brunswick
- Fredericton, Prince Edward Island
- HMCS Fredericton, several Canadian warships
- Silver King Camp, abandoned mine that grew into the ghost town Fredericton
