= William John Macdonald =

Canadian politician (1832–1916)

The Honourable William John Macdonald
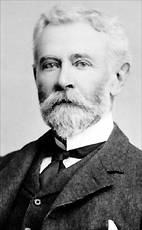

Canadian Senator from British Columbia
- In office 13 December 1871 – 13 April 1915

Mayor of Victoria
- In office 1871
- Preceded by: Alexander Rocke Robertson
- Succeeded by: Richard Lewis
- In office 1866–1867
- Preceded by: Lumley Franklin
- Succeeded by: James Trimble

Personal details
- Born: 29 November 1832 Isle of Skye, Scotland
- Died: 25 October 1916 (aged 83) Victoria, British Columbia, Canada
- Party: Conservative
- Spouse: Catherine Balfour "Kate" Reid
- Children: Flora Alexandrina MacDonald Edythe Mary MacDonald Lillias Christina MacDonald Reginald James of Vallay MacDonald Lulies MacDonald William Balfour Macdonald Of Vallay Alistair Douglas Macdonald Of Vallay

William John Macdonald (29 November 1832 – 25 October 1916) was a Canadian merchant and politician. He migrated from the UK to the then separate colony of Vancouver Island aboard the Tory, a seven-month voyage from 1850 to 1851. He had been engaged as a clerk for the Hudson's Bay Company which at that time ruled Vancouver Island under a grant from the British. He served two terms as mayor of Victoria, British Columbia, in 1866, 1867 and 1871.

== Background ==
A Conservative, he was appointed to the Senate of Canada on 13 December 1871 on the recommendation of Sir John A. Macdonald. He represented the senatorial division of Victoria until his resignation on 13 April 1915.
