= Murder of William Robinson =

1868 murder in British Columbia, Canada

The murder of William Robinson, an African-American immigrant to Canada and a Sunday school teacher, occurred in March 1868 on Salt Spring Island, British Columbia. A short investigation and trial convicted a local Chemainus Indigenous man named Tom (Tshuanahusset) for the murder. Later historians have questioned the validity of the verdict and the lack of evidence of Tshuanahusset's guilt.

== Life and murder ==
William Robinson, along with a few other African-Americans, immigrated to Salt Spring Island, British Columbia in Canada in the mid-1860s. He lived peacefully by himself in an isolated cabin and often attended church. Within a few years of his immigration, he was murdered. Evidence suggests that he was shot in the back while eating dinner. His murder was one of a string of murders that plagued this small community during the mid to late 1860s. An investigation was launched to discover who had committed the gruesome killing.

== Investigation and trial ==
The investigation soon concluded that a local Chemainus Indigenous man, Tshuanahusset, was responsible for William's murder. A trial quickly found Tshuanahusset guilty and sentenced him to death shortly after. Tshuanahusset was executed by hanging on 24 July 1869.

The case against Tshuanahusset was questionable at best and historians have wondered whether or not he was the actual murderer. Certain evidence does point to Tshuanahusset murdering William Robinson. A local resident, John Norton, was told by an anonymous Indigenous person fishing near his house that Tshuanahusset had killed William Robinson and the murder weapon was hidden in a box in his house. Furthermore, Sue Tas, a member of Tshuanahusset's tribe, claims to have been with Tshuanahusset when he murdered William Robinson and testified to this in court.

The evidence against Tshuanahusset seems overwhelming, but there are many holes in the case against him. For example, the auger (allegedly belonging to Robinson) that was found in his house was 'lost' in the lake after it fell out of the Constable's canoe. Tshuanahusset was also the only one seriously investigated, even though there were other people who should have been strong suspects in the investigation.
