= Alec Stewart (Australian footballer) =

Australian rules footballer, born 1915

Personal information
- Full name: Alec Stewart
- Born: 22 February 1915
- Died: 17 November 1976 (aged 61)
- Height: 180 cm (5 ft 11 in)
- Weight: 78 kg (172 lb)

Playing career^{1}
Years	Club	Games (Goals)
1941–1942	North Melbourne	3 (1)
- ^{1} Playing statistics correct to the end of 1942.

Alec Stewart (22 February 1915 – 17 November 1976) was an Australian rules footballer who played for the North Melbourne Football Club in the Victorian Football League (VFL).
