= Alfred J. Morley =

Alfred James Morley (1861 – September 16, 1958) was a civil engineer, businessman and politician in British Columbia, Canada. He was mayor of Victoria from 1905 to 1907, from 1909 to 1911 and in 1913.

Born in England, Morley came to California and later settled in Victoria. He married Mary Goodall. Morley owned the Victoria Coffee & Spice Mills until 1909.

Morley was elected in part due to a rising demand for moral reform in Victoria. After he was elected, Morley and the police chief struck an unofficial deal with Stella Carroll, a popular "madam" in the city. If she would move her brothel out of downtown and into what was considered the town's "red-light district", she would be left alone. However, public pressure forced the mayor to renege on this deal.

He died in Victoria at the age of 96.
