= William M. Marchant =

Canadian politician

William M. Marchant (1854–1935) was a Canadian politician and had been the mayor of Victoria, British Columbia from 1921 to 1922.
