= Silver King Camp =

Ghost town from 1880s on Toad Mountain, West Kootenay, British Columbia, Canada

Silver King Camp, also known as Fredericton, is a ghost town located in the West Kootenay region of British Columbia. The town is located on Toad Mountain near Nelson and was founded in the 1880s. It had a high elevation, at around 1,813 meters above sea level. In 1887, silver ore was discovered on Toad Mountain, and a mine was created called the Silver King which was owned by the Hall family of Nelson. A small town, named Fredericton, grew around the workings of the mine. By 1898, Silver King Camp had a population of 190. The Silver King mine was the greatest exporter of silver ore to the Nelson Smelter for two decades. A forest fire destroyed Silver King Camp and today little remains of its town. The town had few businesses, but the most notable of these was the Toad Mountain Hotel.
