= Alexander G. McCandless =

Alexander McCandless (January 1, 1861 – January 5, 1939) was Mayor of Victoria, British Columbia from 1902 to 1903.
