= Alexander Stewart (British Columbia politician) =

Canadian politician

Alexander Stewart (1863–1943) was a Canadian politician, who was the mayor of Victoria, British Columbia from 1914 to 1916.

In July 1916, Stewart joined the Executive Council of British Columbia as the Minister of Finance in the cabinet of William John Bowser.
