= John Teague (Canadian politician) =

Canadian architect and mayor (1833–1902)

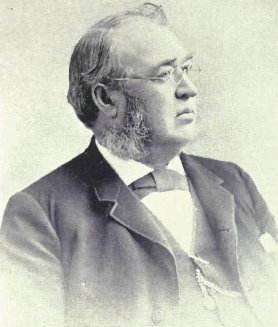

Mayor of Victoria, British Columbia
- In office 1894–1895
- Preceded by: Robert Beaven
- Succeeded by: Robert Beaven

Personal details
- Born: June 3, 1833 Cornwall, United Kingdom
- Died: 25 October 1902 (aged 69) Victoria, British Columbia

John Teague (June 3, 1833 – October 25, 1902) was a Canadian architect and politician who served as mayor of Victoria, British Columbia from 1894 until 1895.

Born in Redruth, Cornwall, United Kingdom, Teague left the UK in 1856 spending some time in California before emigrating to British Columbia in 1858. He was an alderman and mayor of Victoria from 1894 until 1895. As an architect and contractor, he played an important role in the design and construction of the most important churches, commercial, residential and civic buildings of his time in Victoria.

He was married twice: first to Emily Abington in 1863 and then to Eliza Lazenby in 1892.

Teague died in Victoria at the age of 67.
