= James E. McMillan =

Canadian politician

James McMillan (???-1907) was elected mayor of Victoria, British Columbia, in 1859. He was a newspaperman from Ontario.

== Personal life ==
He was married in 1837. From 1844 to 1859 he worked for various Ontario Newspapers before coming out to Vancouver Island.

His daughter Elizabeth was one of the fatalities of the 1875 SS Pacific wreck at the entrance to the Strait of Juan de Fuca.

He and his wife both died in 1907 and are buried in Ross Bay Cemetery.

== Newspapers ==
He founded the Daily Chronicle in 1862 in Victoria. He sold his interest in 1865. In October 1865 he bought a half interest in the British Columbian in New Westminster.

By 1870 he owned the News in Victoria. It was when he owned the News that he was sued successfully by Amor de Cosmos for libel. He then sold the paper to de Cosmos. De Cosmos hired McMillan as a printer and then journalist and finally in 1871 as editor in chief of the Standard.

== Civic politics ==
He was elected to one term as an alderman and then in 1872 was elected mayor.

== 1872 election ==
- James McMillan 124
- Arthur Keast 104
