= Charles E. Redfern =

English-born jeweller and political figure in Canada

Charles Edward Redfern (October 23, 1839 – March 26, 1929) was an English-born jeweller and political figure in British Columbia, Canada. He was mayor of Victoria from 1882 to 1883 and from 1896 to 1899.

He was born in London, the son of Charles Edward Redfern. He apprenticed with his father, who was a watchmaker. Redfern came to Victoria in 1862, where he entered the jewelry business. In 1877, he married Eliza Arden Robinson. Redfern served as president of the British Columbia Pioneer Society and of the local St. George's Society. He also served on the executive for the Royal Jubilee Hospital. His business went bankrupt in 1914 and he worked for the Marine Department until he retired in 1922. He died of a stroke at the age of 88 and is buried in Ross Bay Cemetery in Victoria, British Columbia.

A clock on the street outside his shop on Government Street was Victoria's first town clock. In 1891, Redfern installed a clock on the city hall.

Redford Street and Redford Park were named in his honour.
