= Robert Cross (Canadian politician) =

Canadian politician

- Born: 1939 or 1940 (age 85–86)
- Other names: Robert Cross, Jr; Bob Cross
- Known for: being the former mayor of the city of Victoria, British Columbia

Robert Cross Jr (born 1939 or 1940) is a Canadian politician, who served as mayor of Victoria, British Columbia. Cross was the mayor of Victoria from 1994 to 1999. Cross served two terms as mayor of Victoria before leaving office and politics as a whole. Cross has been the center of many controversies including a contentious plan to develop a multiplex. During the last few days in office Cross stated he had concerns about the state of the project but stated that he had simply "done all he can do". His father, Robert Cross Sr, was noted for the historic building, Victoria House. He was the former owner of his family's business, Cross' Meat Market.

== See also ==
- List of mayors of Victoria, British Columbia
