= Percy E. George =

Mayor of Victoria, British Columbia, Canada

Percival Edward George (1 July 1890 – 28 March 1983) was a Canadian politician and mayor of Victoria, British Columbia from 1944 to 1951.

George was born in Finchley, London in 1890. During the First World War, he served in Princess Mary's Canadian Scottish Regiment and the Canadian Overseas Expeditionary Force.
