= David Leeming =

Canadian mayor (1876–1939)

David Leeming (1876 – January 2, 1939) was an English-born politician in British Columbia, Canada. He served as mayor of Victoria from 1931 to 1936.

He was born in Manchester and moved to Victoria in 1894. He worked as a real estate agent and customs broker. In 1908, he married Amy Theresa McKenzie. Leeming served on Victoria city council from 1922 to 1923. He was a director of the Victoria and Island Publicity Bureau, also serving as president, and was a member of the Victoria Chamber of Commerce. Leeming also served as president of the Victoria Real Estate Board.

He died in Victoria at the age of 62.
