= Shawn Graham =

Premier of New Brunswick from 2006 to 2010

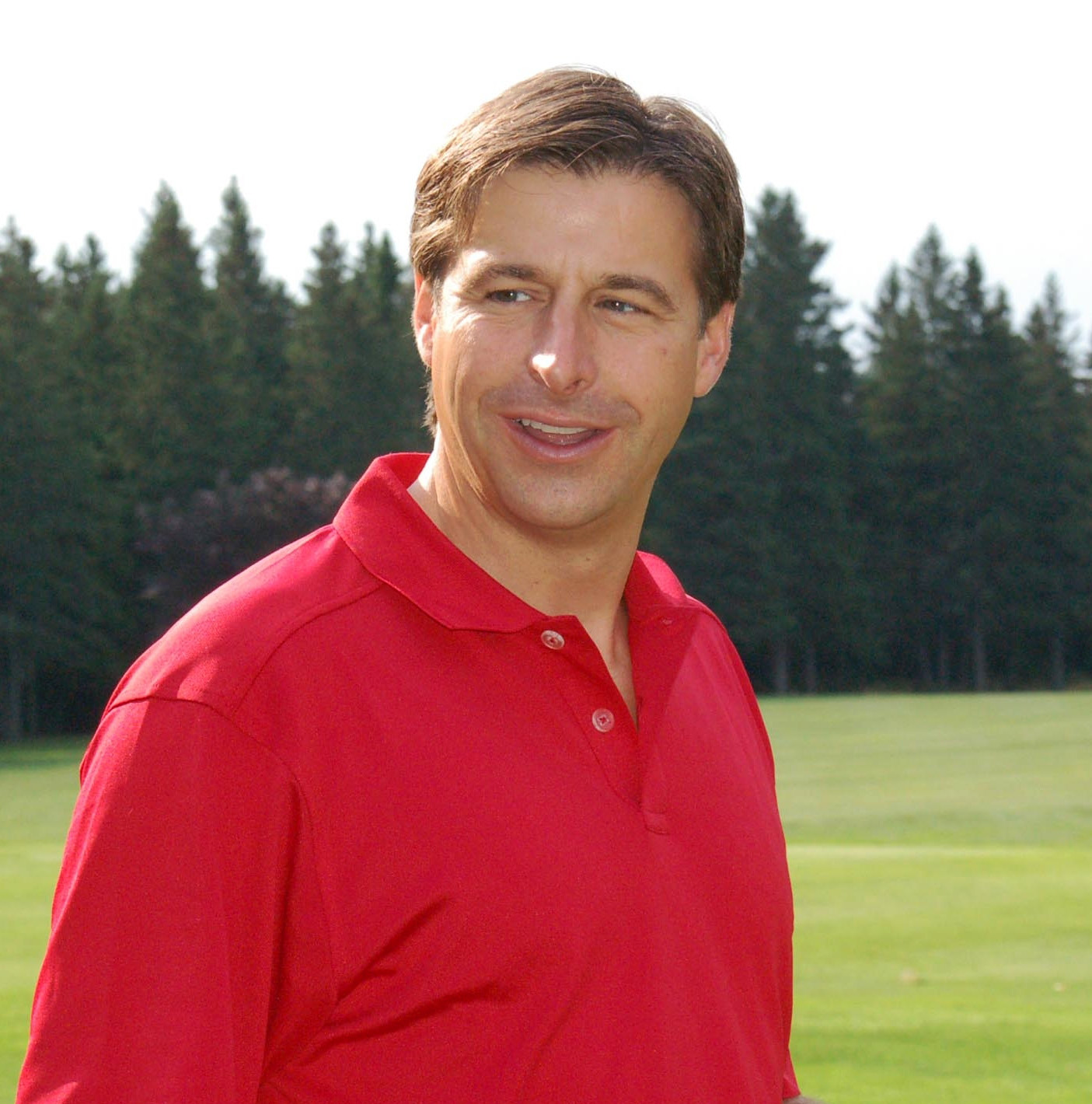
- Graham in 2007

31st Premier of New Brunswick
- In office October 3, 2006 – October 12, 2010
- Monarch: Elizabeth II
- Lieutenant Governor: Herménégilde Chiasson; Graydon Nicholas
- Preceded by: Bernard Lord
- Succeeded by: David Alward

Member of the New Brunswick Legislative Assembly for Kent
- In office October 19, 1998 – March 11, 2013
- Preceded by: Alan Graham
- Succeeded by: Brian Gallant

Personal details
- Born: Shawn Michael Graham; February 22, 1968 (age 58) Rexton, New Brunswick, Canada
- Party: Liberal
- Spouse: Roxane Reeves

Shawn Michael Graham (born February 22, 1968) is a Canadian politician, who served as the 31st premier of New Brunswick from 2006 to 2010. He was elected leader of the New Brunswick Liberal Party in 2002 and became premier after his party captured a majority of seats in the 2006 election. After being elected, Graham initiated a number of changes to provincial policy especially in the areas of health care, education and energy. His party was defeated in the New Brunswick provincial election held September 27, 2010, and Graham resigned as Liberal leader on November 9, 2010.

== Early career ==
Graham was born in Rexton, New Brunswick, Canada and raised in a political family, with his father Alan R. Graham being the longest serving member of the Legislative Assembly of New Brunswick. The family has ancestral homes in the communities of Five Rivers and Main River with roots going back to the early 19th century. Shawn Graham was born the year after his father's first election as MLA for Kent County, New Brunswick.

Graham graduated from the University of New Brunswick, as an alumnus of both Harrison House and Neill House, after which he completed an education degree at St Thomas University in Fredericton. Graham spent much of his career before entering elected politics working for the province's civil service and when his father resigned from the legislature in 1998, Shawn Graham was elected to replace him in a by-election called by Premier Camille Theriault as a member of the Liberal Party. Following the general election of 1999, the Liberals were reduced to 10 seats from 45, and by early 2001 they were down to 7 seats following the resignation of several former cabinet ministers. This gave the young politician the chance to rise to prominence.

== Leadership campaign ==
Liberal leader Camille Theriault resigned in March 2001, and a leadership convention was set for May 12, 2002. Few candidates emerged for this campaign and it appeared that former cabinet minister Paul Duffie would win virtually unopposed. Graham was urged to run, and eventually entered the race with the support of Greg Byrne, a previous leadership contender, and many of the supporters of Bernard Richard, also a former leadership contender and the interim leader following the resignation of Theriault.

Surprising many pundits, Graham was successful in taking a solid lead during delegate selection meetings in February and March 2002, and, as a result, Duffie dropped out of the race. This left only fringe candidate Jack MacDougall in the race who Graham defeated by a 3 to 1 margin at the May convention.

== Toward the 2003 election ==
As leader, Graham was considered a lightweight by pundits and by the governing Progressive Conservative Party, and few gave him a chance in the 2003 election.

Graham surprised pundits again during the 2003 election, running an energetic campaign and winning 26 of 55 seats, just two short of the Conservatives, and coming within 1% of the Conservatives in the popular vote. Pundits said Graham and Lord had fought the English language debate to a draw, while they viewed Graham as the winner of the French debate; this was despite the fact that Lord was a francophone and that Graham's command of French was viewed as one of his largest liabilities. The Liberals controlled the agenda of the campaign, always keeping their three key issues: public automobile insurance, public health care and public power in the forefront of the agenda.

Graham often cited the fact that had 10 votes swung from the Conservatives to the Liberals in the riding of Kennebecasis there would have been a 27–27 tie which may have led to a Liberal minority government supported by the New Democrats whose one member would have held the balance of power. Graham was quoted on election night saying "until five minutes ago, I thought I was going to be premier".

== Toward the 2006 election ==
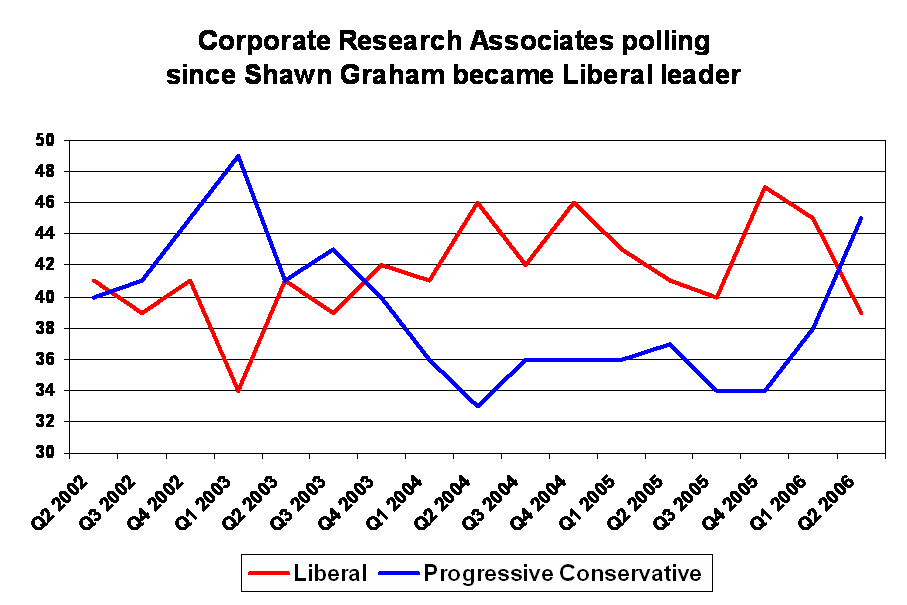
Graham's Liberals (red) held a continuous lead over their main opponents, the Progressive Conservatives (blue), for over two years in opinion polls before slipping behind following a prolonged debate over procedure in the legislature

Graham's Liberals captured a by-election victory on October 4, 2004, in Shediac-Cap-Pelé. Graham's upward momentum continued when, in an opinion poll released on December 9, 2004, the Liberals expanded their lead over the Conservatives to 46% to 36%, but also, for the first time since Graham became leader, he was the preferred choice of New Brunswickers for premier beating the incumbent Bernard Lord 34% to 27%.

In the spring session of the legislature, Graham attempted to pass a snap motion of no confidence during his speech on the budget. There was brief excitement on Liberal benches as less than half of the government caucus was present for Graham's speech, however the speaker ruled that the vote would be held along with the main budget motion at the end of the following week. Graham was criticised because when the vote was held two of his members were absent. Graham defended their absence arguing that, because New Democratic Party leader Elizabeth Weir was also absent, it was impossible to defeat the government, and he did not see the need to whip his members.

Graham's victory in a subsequent by-election on November 14, 2005, in Saint John Harbour with candidate Ed Doherty, as well as his continued lead in opinion polls, quieted any criticism of his leadership for a time. In 2006, however, following the brief minority government when Michael Malley left the government caucus for 6 weeks, Graham took a very aggressive stance towards forcing an election. A prolonged dispute over the functioning of legislature was undertaken, crippling most of the business of the House. Graham and the Liberals were criticized for this and, for the first time in over 2 years, in June 2006 the PCs regained the lead in opinion polls and Lord took a double-digit lead in preference for Premier.

Throughout the term that began following the 2003 election, Graham has worked hard to portray himself and his caucus as a "government-in-waiting". From the Lord government's introduction of controversial health reforms in the spring of 2004, Graham said he would force an election at his earliest opportunity.

His strategy was to focus heavily on policy, and his party introduced a record number of pieces of legislation for an opposition party.

In addition to his legislative agenda, Graham and the Liberals launched a series of regional policy meetings culminating in a policy convention in the fall of 2005. Graham also convened a meeting of all of the Liberal leaders of the Maritime provinces to discuss common policy objectives, engaged in several tours of the province on particular policy issues and took several trips to Ottawa to meet with federal ministers on various issues.

In early 2006, Graham set out on a tour of the northeast United States, Washington, D.C. and the Maritimes to promote New Brunswick as an "energy hub" and his idea of building a second reactor at the Point Lepreau Nuclear Generating Station.

On February 17, 2006, Bernard Lord's government was reduced to a minority when Michael Malley crossed the floor to sit as an independent. Graham said, if Malley would support the Liberals, he would have brought down the government on an April 7, 2006 budget vote forcing an early election. Malley was subsequently elected speaker however, creating an equality of government and opposition members; the April 7 vote came to a tie which was broken in favour of the government by Malley in accordance with tradition.

Following this, Malley rejoined the Conservative caucus from the speaker's chair. This created some controversy and Graham's Liberals held up some business in the House as a procedural stalemate ensued for some weeks. Finally the Conservative and Liberal House Leaders signed an agreement on May 31, 2006, which laid out a detailed plan for the conduct of the business of the House and which seemingly guaranteed that the next election would be held on Lord's preferred date of October 15, 2007. This protracted procedural battle did not seem to go well for the Liberals when, in an opinion poll released on June 12, 2006, the Tories took the lead over the Liberals for the first time in any poll since August 2003.

=== The election campaign ===
Bernard Lord announced on August 10, 2006, that an election would be held on September 18, 2006, due to the pending resignation of Conservative MLA Peter Mesheau from the legislature that would have created another minority government.

Graham had already started a campaign in earnest, having announced his energy platform on August 8 and having nominated several candidates already. With the election call, the party gave him the authority to appoint the 25 MLAs seeking re-election as candidates bringing the total number of nominated Liberal candidates to 30 of 55. Graham said he would pursue education, economic development and energy as three key issues during the campaign.

Graham stated that if he did not win the election, he would resign as Liberal leader.

Graham won the 2006 election by taking 29 out of the 55 seats in the legislature despite the Liberals narrowly trailing the Progressive Conservatives in the popular vote.

== Premier of New Brunswick ==
Graham was elected premier under a platform called the Charter for Change, he pledged to focus on "the three Es": energy, education and the economy. He also pledged to make the province self-sufficient, that is to no longer depend on federal equalization payments, by 2026.

Though they won the election with a slight deficit in the popular vote, upon taking office, the Liberals surged in popularity. In December 2006, a poll showed the Liberals had surged to a lead of 65–27 in opinion polls, thereafter polls have shown the Liberals ahead by a minimum of 17%.

Graham's Liberals maintained the lead in a number of polls despite addressing a number of controversial issues such as post-secondary education reform, French second-language education, a bailout of a credit union and the restructuring of the province's public health care administration.

=== Transition and day-one actions ===
On September 20, 2006, Graham appointed a transition team to begin to transfer power headed by Doug Tyler. Graham, as New Brunswick's 31st Premier, and the rest of the cabinet were sworn in by Lieutenant-Governor Herménégilde Chiasson on October 3, 2006.

On his first day in office, Graham acted on five campaign promises. His government cut the excise tax on gasoline by 3.8 cents per litre, moved nursing home payments from an assets-based test to an income-based test, provided students with a reduced tuition of $2000 for their first year in university, provided the City of Saint John with a memorandum of understanding to provide a third of required monies for the clean up of Saint John harbour and established separate ministers for Agriculture & Aquaculture, Fisheries, Housing and Seniors. Additionally, on its first day in office, it pledged $2 million to assist in maintaining ferry service from Saint John to Digby, Nova Scotia.

In addition to being Premier and Minister of Intergovernmental Affairs (a post often held by premiers in Canada), Graham took on the role of Minister of Wellness, Culture and Sport. Graham, who has a background in athletics competing in the 1985 Canada Games for New Brunswick in track and field, wanted to take the portfolio to ensure it was a priority in large part to fight childhood obesity in the province, which is the highest in the country.

=== First year (2006–07) ===
On October 12, 2006, Graham announced several senior appointments. He appointed a president of NB Liquor and deputy ministers for the Department of Energy and the Department of Justice and Consumer Affairs to replace Conservative political appointees who had resigned when Graham took office. He also appointed former cabinet minister Bernard Thériault as his chief of staff and his former Opposition chief of staff Chris Baker to be secretary of the Policy and Priorities Committee of Cabinet.

Early in its mandate, the government implemented increases to the amount of care received by nursing home and homecare clients. It also appointed Bernard Richard as Child and Youth Advocate, a position which had been vacant since its creation in 2005 as a result of a then-opposition Liberal-sponsored bill. In December 2006, the province announced an agreement with private auto insurance companies that would see some restructuring of regulations and an average decrease of 13.5% in insurance rates by March 1, 2007. The province also appointed several commissions to investigate larger issues: a Community Non-Profit Task Force, a Self-Sufficiency Task Force and a Commission on Post-Secondary Education. The Liberals however cancelled a tax rebate on energy costs brought forward by the previous government which they had said they would maintain. The Liberals defended the move saying that the Conservatives had left the province's finances "in a downward spiral" and that the program was bad policy because it didn't encourage energy conservation.

On March 13, 2007, Graham's Finance Minister Victor Boudreau introduced the government's first budget. While the budget was balanced, despite warnings months earlier from an independent auditor that the province was facing a massive deficit, and increased spending in priority areas, it was criticized by the opposition for having raised some taxes. Boudreau defended the increases saying "we all enjoy lower taxes, but when the level of taxation is insufficient to ensure the continued provision of essential public services, it needs to be addressed."

The spring of 2007 saw the Liberal majority grow by six; they added a seat when Chris Collins won a by-election in Moncton East, the seat vacated when former Premier Bernard Lord stepped down from provincial politics. A short time later, Tory MLAs and spouses Wally Stiles and Joan MacAlpine-Stiles crossed the floor to give the Liberals 32 seats, compared to 23 for the opposition.

The report of the Self-Sufficiency Task Force was released in May will 91 recommendations covering 11 themes, 80 of which were to be acted upon within one year.

During a marathon 79-day spring sitting of the legislature, Graham's government unveiled an education plan called When Kids Come First the stated aim of which is to build the best education system in Canada. The government began a refurbishment of its Point Lepreau Nuclear Generating Station, launched a feasibility study into building a second reactor there, and began projects to add 300 megawatts of wind power to the province's electric grid. It also invested $40 million into affordable housing and opened 125 new nursing home beds. Additionally, Graham and his Environment Minister Roland Haché launched a Climate Change Action Plan, a five-year strategy to reduce greenhouse gas emissions in the province.

Over the summer, a number of major economic projects were announced by Graham including a $1.7 billion potash mine near Sussex and a $21.5 million steel fabrication plan and centre of excellence in Miramichi.

In August, Graham hosted all 13 Canadian premiers and territorial leaders in Moncton as incoming chair of the Council of the Federation. The meeting focused on issues of energy and climate change.

In September, the report of the Commission on Post-Secondary Education was released. It contained a wide-number of recommendations meant to be considered together as a comprehensive reform package. The authors indicated in their submission to government that:

Due to the complexities and interrelationships involved, this is a document that cannot be easily scanned. Readers will need to spend time understanding the dynamics and relevance of the issues raised. At the risk of stating the obvious, the recommendations are also highly interrelated and should not be considered discrete advice. Such an approach could result in the essence of the report being misinterpreted.

The day the report was presented to government, Post-Secondary Education Minister Ed Doherty was quoted at the top of a news release saying, "these are only recommendations from an independent commission and final decisions haven't been made yet by our government" and that government would take time to evaluate them before making any decisions.

The most controversial proposal was to convert the Saint John campus of the University of New Brunswick, and the Edmundston and Shippagan campuses of the University of Moncton into "polytechnics." Controversy surrounded the Saint John school in particular. A month later the government said it would set aside the possibility of UNB Saint John losing its status as a 'university' and would refer the report to a working group for further study. The government would go on to announce in January that UNBSJ would retain its liberal arts program and its association with UNB and the working group reported back to government in May, with its findings and government's response being made public in June.

=== Second year (2007–08) ===
Shortly after the first anniversary of his election, Graham shuffled his cabinet. He added two new ministers: outgoing speaker Eugene McGinley and Wally Stiles. Five other ministers were affected by the shuffle. Two ministers who had multiple portfolios ceded some of their responsibilities: the premier ceded his responsibility for the Department of Wellness, Culture and Sport; and Finance Minister Victor Boudreau gave up responsibility for the Department of Local Government. Three other ministers, namely Hédard Albert, Carmel Robichaud and Mary Schryer changed portfolios, including a promotion for Schryer who moved from minister of state to full minister. There was another minor adjustment to cabinet in January 2008 when Roly MacIntyre resigned from cabinet, his portfolios were taken on by other ministers in the cabinet.

In January, Graham unveiled a new brand called Be... in this place to give a common look and feel to provincial activities. A new brand was the first recommendation of the Self-Sufficiency Task Force. In February, the province unveiled its population growth strategy called Be Our Future setting out the plan to attract 100,000 new people to the province by 2026 as part of achieving self-sufficiency.

In March, the government tabled its second balanced budget which included record increases to the health and education budgets and a tuition freeze for students at the province's four public universities.

In March and April, the province unveiled its plans for healthcare. A dramatic change to the administration of the province's public healthcare moved the province from eight regional health authorities to two with a new crown corporation to handle non-clinical functions on behalf of both authorities. A new provincial health plan, was also launched with plans to invest over $154 million in addition to regular inflationary increases over four years. The plan included plans for new community health centres, broader addiction treatment services, HPV vaccinations for school children, the introduction of midwifery to the public health system, enabling pharmacists to write some prescriptions and the hiring of 100 new doctors and 40 nurse practitioners.

Much of the spring and summer of Graham's second year in office was dominated by the debate of French second-language programs. In February, a commission recommended that government should scrap early immersion in favour of a universal curriculum in elementary school which would see anglophone students learn in their mother tongue from kindergarten through Grade 4 and then all study French through an intensive program in Grade 5 before choosing between an immersion or non-immersion program. The commission said that this was the best route because under the existing model, over 93% of students with special learning needs were being streamed into non-immersion classrooms. In March, Minister of Education Kelly Lamrock announced that the government would move forward with the recommendations for the reasons stated by the commissioners. Lamrock said the changes would further promote bilingualism by giving all students access to a quality second-language program noting that the early immersion model had been implemented in a time when there was resistance to bilingualism and that it only worked well for small groups of students, not the large groups that were now interested in becoming bilingual. There was considerable opposition to this move, including from the province's official languages commissioner and ombudsman. In June, the Court of Queen's Bench ruled on a case brought forward by opponents to the changes. The court sided with the opponents on one ground that the government had implied that there would be two months of consultation on the commission report, when there had only been two weeks. Though the court ruled in favour of the government on two other grounds, it quashed the decision saying that the government could go forward with the changes as is but first must consult the public. Following an additional six weeks of consultation, on August 5 the government announced a revised model to be implemented in September 2008, which would provide a "universal learning environment" including exposure to French culture from kindergarten through Grade 2 projected to start in 2009, an optional entry to immersion in Grade 3 projected to start in 2010, further French instruction for non-immersion students in grades 3 through 5 with another optional entry to late immersion in Grade 6. The revised program has been generally well received.

In June, the working group that had been appointed to review the Commission on Post-Secondary Education reported back to government. Graham announced that the government would forgo the recommendations about creating polytechnics, but would follow through on recommendations to greater integrate the universities and colleges in the province, and promised at least $90 million in new money. In July, Graham committed $20 million to the restoration of the Petitcodiac River. The river system had been changed by the construction of a causeway in the 1960s.

=== Third year (2008–09) ===
Graham began the third year of his mandate in October 2008.

From October 17 to 19, Graham attended the 12th Francophonie Summit in Quebec City to discuss four major issues: democracy and rule of law; economic governance and solidarity; environment (water management and forest management); and the French language. In addition to the official deliberations, New Brunswick helped organize a cultural event called Passion Francophonie which featured artists from Madagascar, France, Vietnam, Quebec, and New Brunswick; New Brunswick also hosted a breakfast for heads of government that featured New Brunswick food products.

Graham participated in a Council of the Federation trade mission to China from November 2 to 7. The mission yielded $75.5 million in new business for New Brunswick companies on its first full day in China. A by-election was held in the conservative riding of New Maryland-Sunbury West on November 3, 2008. Although the Liberals increased their share of the vote by nearly 3%, they were unable to capture the riding.

On November 12, Graham announced a second major cabinet shuffle. Two ministers - Eugene McGinley and Carmel Robichaud - were dropped from cabinet, while three new individuals joined the cabinet - Rick Brewer, Brian Kenny and Bernard LeBlanc. Three other ministers changed portfolios, including: Donald Arseneault, Ed Doherty and Wally Stiles.

The third legislative session of Graham's government began with a throne speech on November 25, 2008. The speech focussed on "keeping commitments, carefully managing through the 2008 financial crisis, and a renewed focus on and commitment to achieving self-sufficiency."

On the second day of the session, Graham's government introduced a 100-page bill called the Modernization of Benefits and Obligations Act to change all provincial laws making same-sex common law couples equal to opposite-sex couples, in accordance with the M. v. H. decision of the Supreme Court of Canada in 1999. The previous Conservative government, in office from 1999 to 2006, did not introduce such legislation.

On December 3, 2008, Graham's finance minister, Victor Boudreau, gave an economic and fiscal update in light of the economic situation. The statement indicated that the 2008-09 fiscal year would likely see a $285 million deficit, instead of the $19 million surplus that had been projected. In order to stimulate the economy, the government announced it would bring forward a two-year capital spending plan that would total more than $1.2 billion, including the largest capital budget in the province's history for 2009–10 to be tabled on December 9, 2008. Other measures announced to control spending and ensure economic growth in light of the economic situation were: a review of all government programs, providing capital to small, medium and large businesses, renewing a commitment to tax reform that will include "lowering personal and corporate income taxes". Additionally, Boudreau indicated the salaries for members of the legislature would be frozen for one year "to lead by example."

In Graham's 2009 state of the province address, he pledged to make the economy his government's top priority and amended the three Es from his campaign platform (formerly education, energy and the economy) to read, "the economy, the economy, and the economy." He also pledged that his promised changes to the tax system would mean more than $100 million in savings to New Brunswickers in the coming year.

In early March, Graham's party won a by-election in Restigouche-La-Vallée on a swing of nearly 15 per cent. Since the previous election, this was the third by-election, all held in ridings previously held by the Conservative opposition. Graham's Liberals improved their showing in all three ridings, and won two counting this one.

On March 17, Graham joined his finance minister Victor Boudreau to introduce the budget for the 2009-10 fiscal year. The budget included $144 million in personal and corporate tax reductions and a pledge to lower taxes by a total of over $380 million over four years, and budget deficit of $741 million. It centred around the so-called Plan for a Stronger Economy which included the tax cuts, a four-year plan to return the province to balanced budgets, the $1.2 billion in infrastructure spending previously announced in December, investments in priority areas with cuts in other areas to ensure "responsible management" of government expenditure. Savings were released by instituting a two-year wage freeze for all government employees, the elimination of 700 civil service positions and the elimination of some services, most controversially the elimination of three ferries in the lower Saint John River Valley. Later there was also controversy surrounding some cuts to education services—despite an increase of funding to the education department, and a dispute with the province's physicians over their payment. The province's tax reforms attracted positive national attention, however, with the Canadian Federation of Independent Business, the National Post newspaper, and the Atlantic Institute for Market Studies all spoke on it favourably.

In May 2009, Atcon, a long-standing business in the Miramichi region, fell into financial difficulty. Both political parties in the legislature agreed that some sort of assistance should be made to the company, though there was disagreement on the details. In June 2009, Graham's government granted $50 million in loan guarantees, which was in addition to previous assistance granted to the company totalling about $20 million which had been provided by governments of both political stripes over the years. The company eventually failed anyway and the Progressive Conservatives filed an allegation of conflict of interest against Graham which was not resolved until after his government left office.

On June 22, 2009, Graham undertook another cabinet shuffle. In the most significant shuffle since taking office, Graham moved all of his major ministers. There were new ministers for the three largest departments in government – Health, Education and Social Development – as well as the important portfolios of Finance, Attorney General and Business New Brunswick.

=== Fourth year (2009–10) ===
In October 2009 Premier Graham announced a Memorandum of Understanding between the provinces of New Brunswick and Quebec proposing to sell the New Brunswick Power electricity generation, transmission and distribution network to the Quebec government-owned Hydro-Québec electricity corporation. Under this plan Hydro-Québec would pay the $4.8 billion debt of NB Power and provide rate savings valued at $5.6 billion by freezing New Brunswick residential electricity rates for five years and matching industrial rates to Quebec for five years, while rising both at the rate of inflation thereafter. The plan met with some support and some opposition in New Brunswick with opinion polls showing the Liberals losing support because of the proposed agreement, Graham hoped to finalize the deal before March 31, 2010, when a 3% rate increase was scheduled. The opposition Conservatives were very critical of the proposal, though some accused them of hypocrisy for having tried to sell major NB Power assets when they were in power.

On December 1, 2009, Graham's new finance minister Greg Byrne introduced his first budget. It showed the deficit for 2009–10 had come in roughly as expected and that the 2010-11 would be in the same range - about $750 million. The province also revised its target date to return to balanced budgets to 2014–15 from 2012 to 2013, and boosted its two-year stimulus package to $1.6 billion from $1.2 billion.

On January 4, 2010, a minor cabinet shuffle was precipitated by the resignation from cabinet of Justice Minister Mike Murphy for personal reasons. Local Government Minister Bernard LeBlanc replaced Murphy as justice minister, while his other responsibilities - those of attorney general and government house leader - went to Kelly Lamrock and Greg Byrne respectively. Backbencher Chris Collins joined the cabinet to replace LeBlanc as local government minister.

On September 27, 2010, Shawn Graham lost his bid to be re-elected as Premier (13 to 42) to provincial PC leader David Alward, but remained MLA for Kent riding. He stepped down as leader of the party on November 9, 2010; Victor Boudreau was selected as the party's interim leader the following day.

== Later career ==
After resigning as leader of the Liberal Party, Graham continued as a member of the legislative assembly until 2013. Graham said he remained in office in part to allow for the completion of an investigation that had been launched by a political opponent about the granting of financial support to the Atcon companies. The New Brunswick Members' Conflict of Interest Act only applies to sitting politicians, and others have left office before investigations were able to conclude.

After nearly three years of investigation, an 80-page report was issued by the provincial conflict commissioner in February 2013. The report found that Graham's father had a business interest in Atcon and that "the furthering of his father’s private interest although serious, was incidental to the financial aid" Graham's government had granted to Atcon. Because Graham had not excused himself from meetings where assistance to Atcon was discussed, the commissioner fined him $3,500, less than the $8,000 to $16,000 proposed by the commissioners' counsel.

Graham stepped down as MLA for the riding of Kent on March 11, 2013, and paid the fine even though his resignation meant he had no legal obligation to do so. The opposing Progressive Conservative party said that the ensuing by-election would be a chance for voters to issue their own "verdict" on the Atcon case. Graham's successor as Liberal leader, Brian Gallant, won the by-election by more than a 2-to-1 margin over the New Democratic Party with the governing Progressive Conservatives coming a distant third with less than 14% of the vote.

New Brunswick provincial government of Shawn Graham
Cabinet posts (4)
Predecessor	Office	Successor
Bernard Lord	President of the Executive Council; 2006–2010	David Alward
Bernard Lord	Premier of New Brunswick; 2006–2010	David Alward
Bernard Lord	Minister of Intergovernmental Affairs; 2006–2010	David Alward
Percy Mockler	Minister of Wellness, Culture and Sport; 2006–2007	Hédard Albert
Special Cabinet Responsibilities
Predecessor	Title	Successor
Bernard Lord	Minister responsible for the Premier's Council on the Status of Disabled Persons; 2006–2010	David Alward

Legislative Assembly of New Brunswick
Preceded by Bernard Lord	Premier of New Brunswick; 2006–2010	Succeeded by David Alward
Preceded by Bernard Richard	Leader of the Opposition in the Legislative Assembly of New Brunswick; 2002–2006	Succeeded by Bernard Lord
Preceded by Eric Allaby	Chair of the Liberal caucus 1999–2002	Succeeded by Marcelle Mersereau
Party political offices
Preceded by Bernard Richard	Leader of the New Brunswick Liberals; 2002–2010	Succeeded by Victor Boudreau (interim)
