= Leader of the Opposition (New Brunswick) =

The Leader of the Opposition in the Legislative Assembly of the Province of New Brunswick, Canada. The office is recognized under the Legislative Assembly Act, which provides for the officeholder's salary, expenses and staffing. The office is traditionally held by the leader of the largest party not in government, and is often seen as an alternative to the incumbent Premier, and heads a rival alternative government known as the Shadow Cabinet or Opposition Front Bench.

== List of opposition leaders ==
A cohesive and consistent official opposition first formed when A. G. Blair formed the Liberal party in the early 1880s. Previously oppositions occasionally organized over major issues such as anti-prohibitionists led by John Hamilton Gray in the mid-1850s, and pro-Confederationists under Charles Fisher in 1865-1866.

Portrait	Name Electoral district (Birth–Death)	Term of office	Party
	Andrew George Blair; MLA for York (1844–1907)	1879–1883	Liberal
	Daniel Lionel Hanington; MLA for Westmorland (1835–1909)	1883–1892	Conservative
	Alfred Augustus Stockton; MLA for Saint John (1842–1907)	1892–1899	Conservative
	Douglas Hazen; MLA for Sunbury (1853–1937)	1899–1908	Conservative
	Clifford William Robinson; MLA for Westmorland (1866–1944)	1908–1912	Liberal
	Arthur Bliss Copp; MLA for Westmorland (1870–1949)	1912	Liberal
	Louis-Auguste Dugal; MLA for Madawaska (1869–1926)	1912–1917	Liberal
	James Alexander Murray; MLA for Kings (1864–1960)	1917–1920	Conservative
	John Babington Macaulay Baxter; MLA for Saint John County (1868–1946)	1920–1921	Conservative
	Charles Dow Richards; MLA for York (1879–1956)	1921–1925	Conservative
	Peter Veniot; MLA for Gloucester (1863–1936)	1925–1926	Liberal
	Allison Dysart; MLA for Kent (1880–1962)	1926–1935	Liberal
	Frederick C. Squires; MLA for Carleton County (1881–1960)	1935–1939	Conservative
	Hugh Mackay; MLA for Kings County (1887–1957)	1940–1948	Progressive Conservative
	Hugh John Flemming; MLA for Carleton (1899–1982)	1949–1952	Progressive Conservative
	Austin Claude Taylor; MLA for Westmorland (1893–1965)	1952–1957	Liberal
	Joseph E. Connolly; MLA for Gloucester (1887–1973)	1957–1958	Liberal
	Louis Robichaud; MLA for Kent (1925–2005)	1958–1960	Liberal
	Hugh John Flemming; MLA for Carleton (1899–1982)	1960	Progressive Conservative
	Cyril Sherwood; MLA for Kings (1915–1996)	1960–1966	Progressive Conservative
	Charles Van Horne; MLA for Restigouche (1921–2003)	1967	Progressive Conservative
	Richard Hatfield; MLA for Carleton (1931–1991)	1967–1970	Progressive Conservative
	Louis Robichaud; MLA for Kent (1925–2005)	1970–1971	Liberal
	Robert J. Higgins; MLA for Saint John Centre (born 1934)	1971–1978	Liberal
	Joseph Daigle; MLA for Kent North (born 1934)	1978–1981	Liberal
	Doug Young; MLA for Tracadie (born 1940)	1982–1983	Liberal
	Ray Frenette; MLA for Moncton East (1935–2018)	1983–1985	Liberal
	Shirley Dysart; MLA for Saint John Park (1928–2016)	1985	Liberal
	Frank McKenna; MLA for Chatham (born 1948)	1985–1987	Liberal
	Camille Thériault (Note: The Liberals won all seats in the Legislative Assembly in the 1987 election. Camille Thériault was appointed by Premier Frank McKenna as Opposition Leader to ensure proper Parliamentary functions. During that time, no opposition leader, in the sense of the office being held by the leader of the largest non-governing political party, existed.); MLA for Kent South (born 1955)	1987–1991	Liberal
	Danny Cameron; MLA for York South (1924–2009)	1991–1995	Confederation of Regions
	Ab Rector; MLA for Oromocto (1934–2005)	1995	Confederation of Regions
	Greg Hargrove; MLA for York North (born 1959)	1995	Confederation of Regions
	Bernard Valcourt; MLA for Edmundston (born 1952)	1995–1997	Progressive Conservative
	Elvy Robichaud; MLA for Tracadie-Sheila (born 1951)	1997–1998	Progressive Conservative
	Bernard Lord; MLA for Moncton East (born 1965)	1998–1999	Progressive Conservative
	Camille Thériault; MLA for Kent South (born 1955)	1999–2001	Liberal
	Bernard Richard; MLA for Shediac-Cap-Pelé (born 1951)	2001–2002	Liberal
	Shawn Graham; MLA for Kent (born 1968)	2002–2006	Liberal
	Bernard Lord; MLA for Moncton East (born 1965)	2006–2007	Progressive Conservative
	Jeannot Volpé; MLA for Madawaska-les-Lacs (born 1950)	2007–2008	Progressive Conservative
	David Alward; MLA for Woodstock (born 1959)	2008–2010	Progressive Conservative
	Victor Boudreau; MLA for Shediac-Cap-Pelé (born 1970)	2010–2013	Liberal
	Brian Gallant; MLA for Kent (born 1982)	2013–2014	Liberal
	Bruce Fitch; MLA for Riverview	2014–2016	Progressive Conservative
	Blaine Higgs; MLA for Quispamsis (born 1954)	2016–2018	Progressive Conservative
	Brian Gallant; MLA for Shediac Bay-Dieppe (born 1982)	2018–2019	Liberal
	Denis Landry; MLA for Bathurst East-Nepisiguit-Saint-Isidore (born 1957)	2019–2020	Liberal
	Roger Melanson; MLA for Dieppe	2020–2022	Liberal
	Rob McKee; MLA for Moncton Centre (born 1985)	2022–2023	Liberal
	Susan Holt; MLA for Bathurst East-Nepisiguit-Saint-Isidore (born 1977)	2023–2024	Liberal
	Glen Savoie; MLA for Saint John East	2024–2026	Progressive Conservative
	Margaret Johnson; MLA for Carleton-Victoria	2026–present	Progressive Conservative

== See also ==
- Leader of the Opposition (Alberta)
- Leader of the Opposition (British Columbia)
- Leader of the Opposition (Manitoba)
- Leader of the Opposition (Newfoundland and Labrador)
- Leader of the Opposition (Nova Scotia)
- Leader of the Opposition (Ontario)
- Leader of the Opposition (Prince Edward Island)
- Leader of the Opposition (Quebec)
- Leader of the Opposition (Saskatchewan)
- Leader of the Opposition (Yukon Territory)
