= Kathleen Fox (aviator) =

Canadian aviator

Kathleen Fox CM
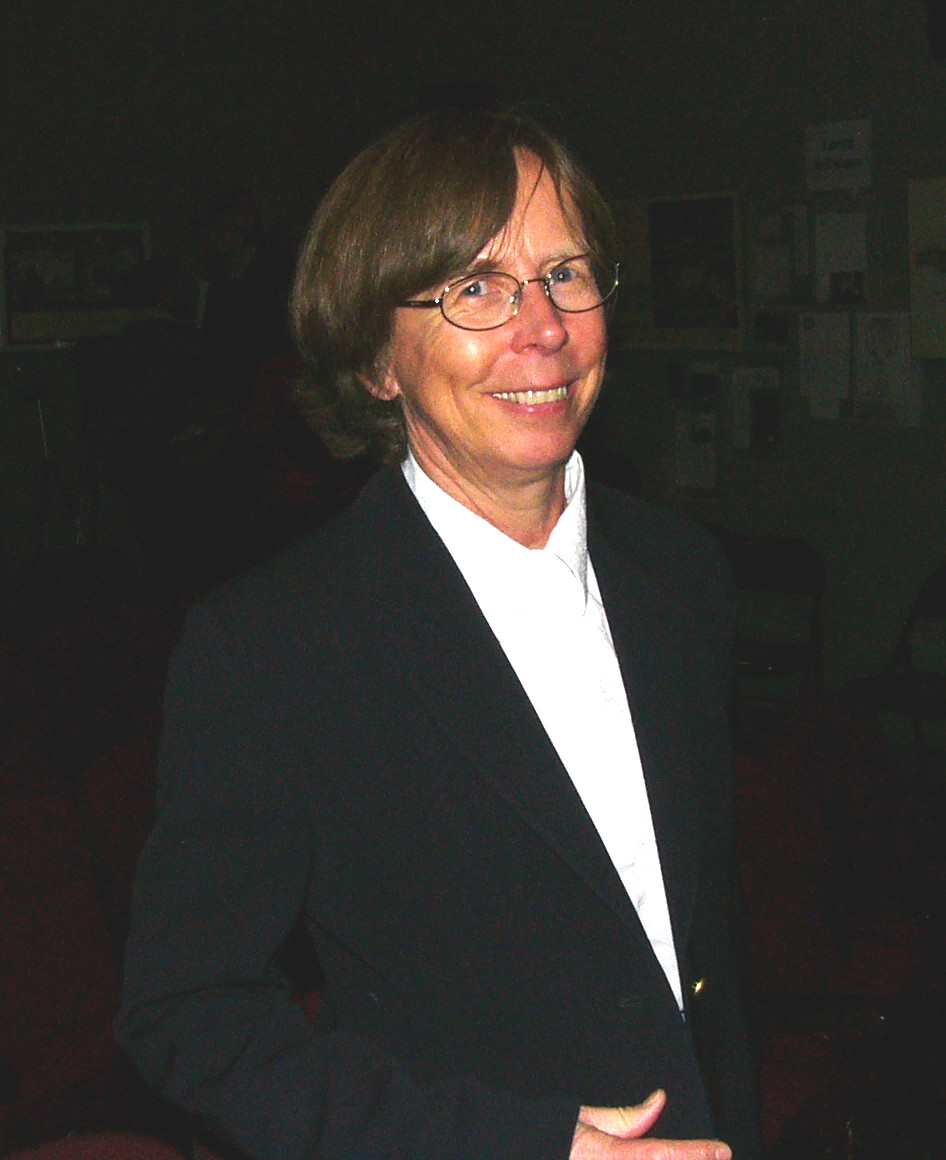
- Fox in 2006

5th Chair of the Transportation Safety Board of Canada
- In office 2014–2024
- Preceded by: Wendy A. Tadros
- Succeeded by: Yoan Marier

Personal details
- Born: Kathleen Carol Fox; 24 December 1951; 74 years ago Montreal, Quebec, Canada
- Occupation: Parachutist, pilot, flight instructor, air traffic controller and executive

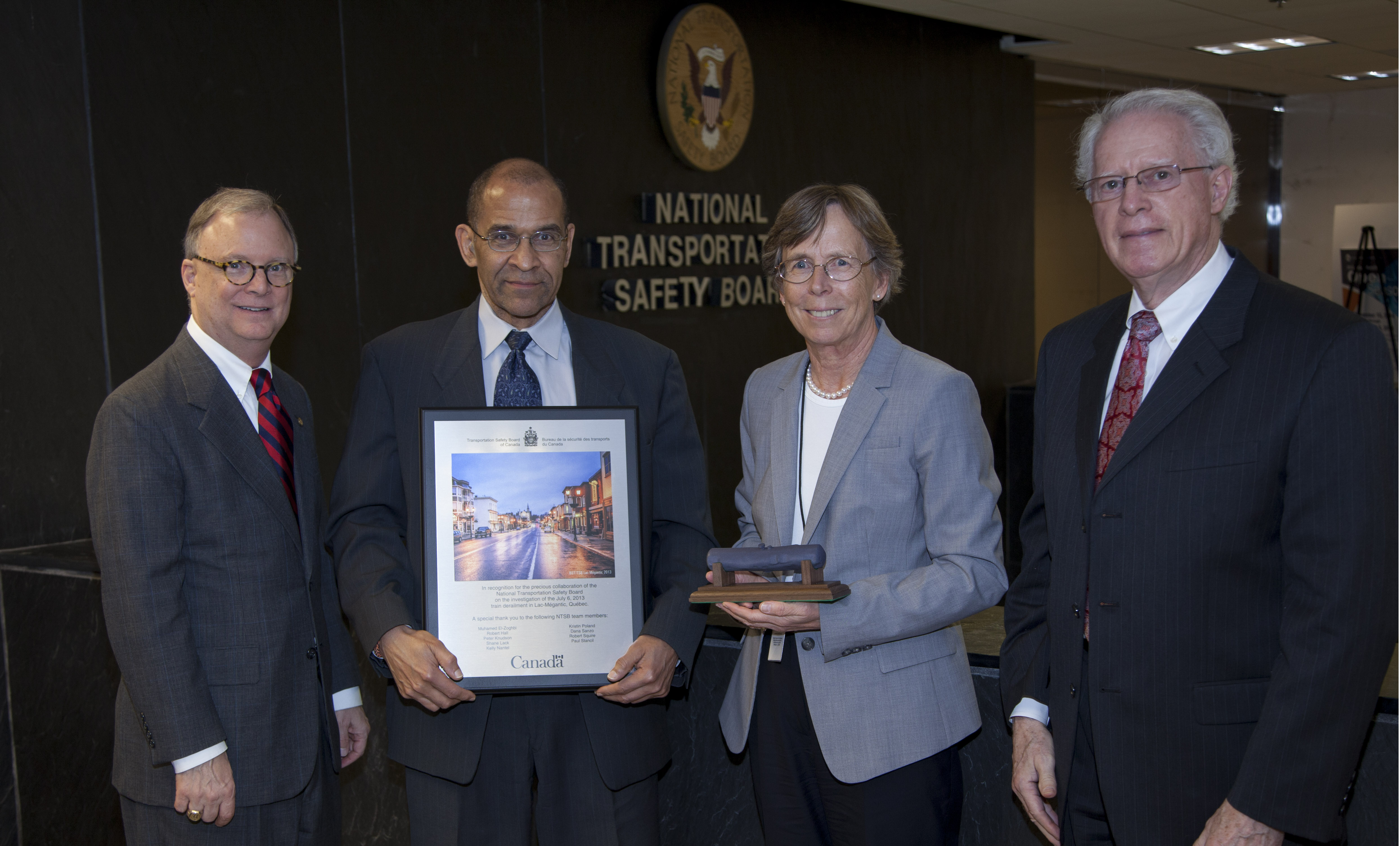
NTSB Chairman Christopher Hart, Board Members Robert Sumwalt, and Earl Weener together with TSB Chair Kathy Fox representing international collaboration to help improve transportation safety.

Kathleen "Kathy" Carol Fox (born 24 December 1951) is a Canadian parachutist, pilot, flight instructor, air traffic controller, and business executive. After spending over 30 years in air traffic control, she was appointed chair of the Canadian Transportation Safety Board in 2014. In 2016, she was inducted into Canada's Aviation Hall of Fame.

== Early life and education ==
Fox was born on 24 December 1951 in Montreal, Quebec, and while still young showed an interest in flying. When she was only five, she used to pretend she was flying helicopters. She took her first flight when she was 13 in a Cessna in Cartierville, Quebec. Three years later, in 1967, an uncle paid for her first flying lesson at the Calgary Flying Club. But then she decided it was more important for her to study than to take flying lessons. As a result, she went on to study mathematics and science at McGill University, later graduating as a Bachelor of Science. She later earned an MBA from McGill.

While at university, in 1968 she took up skydiving. She practised the sport until 1980, becoming Chief Instructor for the McGill Skydiving Club and, when she was just 20, the first woman president of the Canadian Sport Parachuting Association. She organized teams for the 1979 competition in France and a 1980 competition in China. In 1981, she was awarded the Paul Tissandier Diploma by the FAI for her services to parachuting.

== Career ==
On graduating, Fox considered a military career but decided against it when it was suggested she could be a nurse or a dietician. She was also interested in becoming an astronaut but it turned out she was not sufficiently qualified. After teaching for a period at a private school, in 1974 she decided to follow in the footsteps of some of her friends who had joined Transport Canada, aspiring to become air traffic controllers. Fox qualified as a controller in 1976 but opted to train as a pilot, earning her private licence in Sept-Îles, Quebec. After a spell at the control tower at Montreal/Saint-Hubert Airport, she decided to develop her flying career.

She went on to obtain commercial and airline transport pilot licenses as well as instrument and instructor qualifications and has logged more than 5000 hours piloting aircraft. She then joined up with two other pilots and a mechanic to establish Dynamair Aviation near St-Jean-sur-Richelieu, developing a flight school, charter facility and maintenance centre. In parallel, she continued gaining experience in air traffic control at Dorval and Montreal Area Control Centre.

After graduating with a master's degree in business administration from McGill University in 1986, Fox became acting ATC manager at St-Hubert in 1987. In 1989, Transport Canada assigned her to a managerial post in Ottawa. While there, in 1993, she served as a flight instructor and examiner at Ottawa's Rockcliffe Flying Club.

In 1996, Fox joined Nav Canada as safety and quality director. She later became vice-president of operations before retiring in 2007. She was immediately invited to join the Transportation Safety Board of Canada (TSB), later becoming the board's chair. In August 2018, she was reappointed to serve as chair for a further five years.

== Awards ==
In addition to her 2016 Canada Hall of Fame Award, Fox has received the Transport Canada Aviation Safety Award (1999) and was inducted into the Quebec Air and Space Hall of Fame in 2004. She has also received the Elsie MacGill Northern Lights Award (2010) and the David Charles Abramson Memorial Flight Instructor Safety Award (2011). In 2016 she was inducted into Canada's Aviation Hall of Fame, and in 2018, she was inducted into the Women in Aviation Hall of Fame. She was presented with the Fédération aéronautique internationale Paul Tissandier Diploma and the Queen Elizabeth II Diamond Jubilee Medal.

She was made a Member of the Order of Canada on December 31, 2025.
