= Bertin LeBlanc =

Canadian politician

MLA for Kent South
- In office 1978–1982
- Preceded by: Omer Léger
- Succeeded by: Omer Léger

Personal details
- Born: December 28, 1945 (age 80) Ste-Marie-de-Kent, New Brunswick
- Party: New Brunswick Liberal Association
- Spouse: Anise Maillet
- Occupation: Educator

Bertin LeBlanc (born December 28, 1945) is a Canadian politician. He served in the Legislative Assembly of New Brunswick from 1978 to 1982, as a Liberal member for the constituency of Kent South.
