= Bernard Richard =

Canadian social worker, lawyer, and politician

Bernard Richard CM

Member of the House of Assembly
- In office 1991–2003
- Preceded by: Azor LeBlanc
- Succeeded by: Victor Boudreau
- Constituency: Shediac-Cap-Pelé

Personal details
- Born: April 11, 1951 (age 75) Toronto, Ontario, Canada
- Party: Liberal
- Occupation: Social worker, lawyer, politician

Bernard Paul Richard, C.M. (born April 11, 1951) is a Canadian social worker, lawyer, and politician in the Province of New Brunswick.

== Early life and education ==
Raised and educated in Cap-Pelé, New Brunswick, Richard earned a Bachelor of Arts degree from the University of Moncton and a Bachelor of Laws degree from the University of New Brunswick.

== Political career ==
He first entered politics as a young man, running unsuccessfully in Shediac for the Legislative Assembly of New Brunswick as a Parti Acadien candidate in the 1974 election. He became involved in municipal politics in the village of Cap-Pélé. His second entry into provincial politics was in the 1991 election, this time as a Liberal. He won. He was re-elected in 1995, 1999 and 2003.

He was named to cabinet in 1995 and left in 1998 to contest the leadership of the Liberal Party. He was unsuccessful in his leadership bid and was returned to the cabinet position by Camille Thériault who was the victor in the contest. Richard managed to be re-election by the largest margin of any candidate in the 1999 election, despite the fact that his party suffering a massive defeat.

When Thériault resigned as leader in 2001, Richard briefly considered another run but instead became interim leader. When Shawn Graham became leader in 2002, Richard was made House Leader and finance critic, two key roles in the opposition. Richard maintained these roles after the 2003 election.

The Progressive Conservative government of Bernard Lord had won a bare majority in 2003, winning 28 of 55 seats and were anxious to strengthen their position. After first attempting to convince a Liberal to sit as speaker and then offering cabinet positions and other appointments to several Liberals, Richard accepted the post of provincial ombudsman, thus resigning his seat and increasing the Tory majority to 28/54 for the ensuing year before a by-election was held.

On November 6, 2007, New Brunswick news outlets reported that the Progressive Conservatives were encouraging Richard to leave his post as ombudsman and return to politics as leader of their party.

In 2024, he was appointed as a member of the Order of Canada. He lives in Cap-Pelé, New Brunswick.

== Notes ==
New Brunswick provincial government of Camille Thériault
Cabinet post (1)
Predecessor	Office	Successor
Bernard Thériault	Minister of Education; 1998–1999	Elvy Robichaud
New Brunswick provincial government of Ray Frenette
Cabinet post (1)
Predecessor	Office	Successor
himself in McKenna government	Minister of Education; 1997–1998	Bernard Thériault
New Brunswick provincial government of Frank McKenna
Cabinet posts (2)
Predecessor	Office	Successor
James E. Lockyer	Minister of Education; 1997	himself in Frenette government
Paul Duffie	Minister of Justice and Attorney General; 1997 (acting)	James E. Lockyer
Special Cabinet Responsibilities
Predecessor	Title	Successor
none	Minister of State for Intergovernmental and Aboriginal Affairs; 1995–1997 designation only used once	none
Party political offices
Preceded by Camille Thériault	Opposition Leader in the New Brunswick Legislature; 2001–2002	Succeeded by Shawn Graham
Preceded by Camille Thériault	Leader of the New Brunswick Liberal Party; 2001–2002 (interim)	Succeeded by Shawn Graham
Preceded by Marcelle Mersereau	Chair of the Liberal caucus 2002–2003	Succeeded by Scott Targett
