= Shediac-Cap-Acadie =

Provincial electoral district in New Brunswick, Canada

New Brunswick electoral district
- The riding of Shediac-Cap-Acadie (as it exists from 2023) in relation to other New Brunswick electoral districts

Provincial electoral district
- Legislature: Legislative Assembly of New Brunswick
MLA
Jacques LeBlanc
Liberal
- District created: 2023
- First contested: 2024

Shediac-Cap-Acadie is a provincial electoral district for the Legislative Assembly of New Brunswick, Canada. It is the successor to Shediac-Beaubassin-Cap-Pelé, with small swaps with the two neighbouring ridings of Shediac Bay-Dieppe and Tantramar.

== History ==
It was created in 2023 and was first contested in the 2024 New Brunswick general election. The riding contains the municipality of Cap-Acadie and a portion of Shediac.

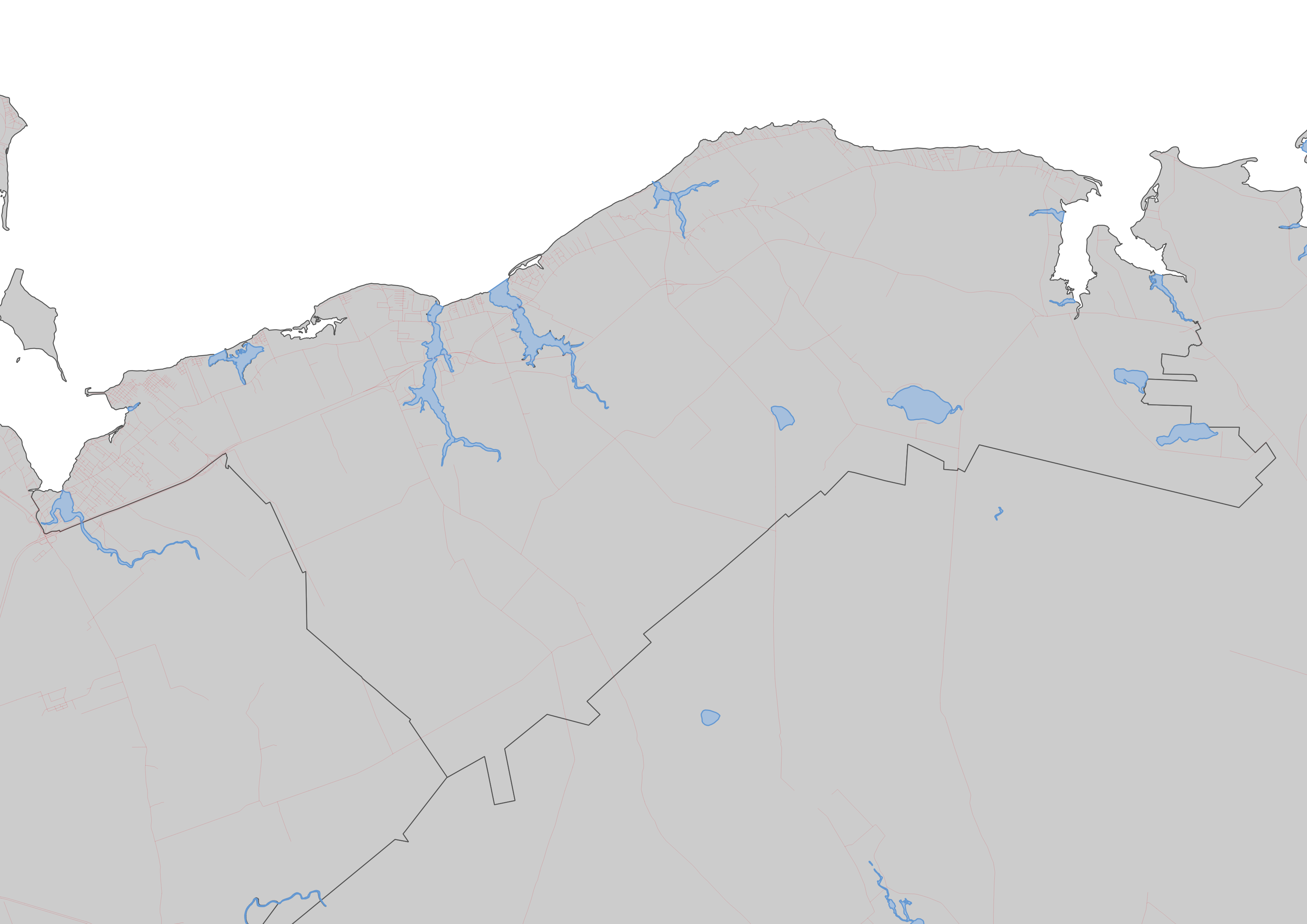
Shediac-Cap-Acadie (as it exists from 2023) and the roads in the riding

== Members of the Legislative Assembly ==
Assembly	Years	Member	Party
Riding created from Shediac-Beaubassin-Cap-Pelé
61st	2024–Present	Jacques LeBlanc	Liberal

== Election results ==
2024 New Brunswick general election
Party	Candidate	Votes	%	±%
Liberal	Jacques LeBlanc	5,438	56.3%	+2.6
Green	Jean Bourgeois	2,901	30.0%	+3.4
Progressive Conservative	Christine Arsenault	1,322	13.7%	-6.1
Total valid votes		9,661		
Total rejected ballots				
Turnout				
Eligible voters				
Liberal hold		Swing		
Source: Elections New Brunswick

2020 provincial election redistributed results
Party	%
Liberal	53.7
Green	26.6
Progressive Conservative	19.8

== See also ==
- List of New Brunswick provincial electoral districts
- Canadian provincial electoral districts
