= Transportation Safety Board of Canada =

Government agency

- Bureau de la sécurité des transports du Canada (French)
- TSB-BST logo

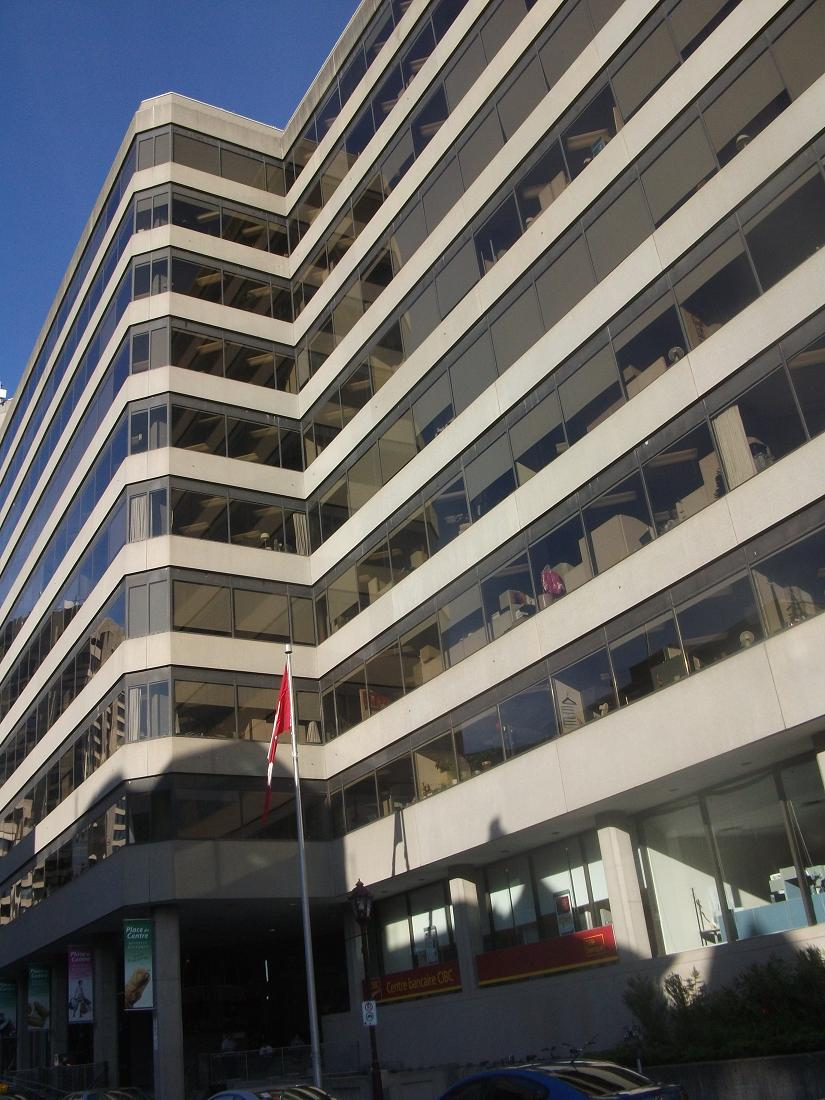
- Place du Centre, the headquarters of the TSB

Agency overview
- Formed: March 29, 1990
- Preceding agency: Canadian Aviation Safety Board (aviation)
- Jurisdiction: Government of Canada
- Headquarters: Gatineau, Quebec
- Employees: 220
- Minister responsible: Dominic LeBlanc, President of the King's Privy Council for Canada
- Agency executive: Yoan Marier, Chair
- Website: tsb.gc.ca

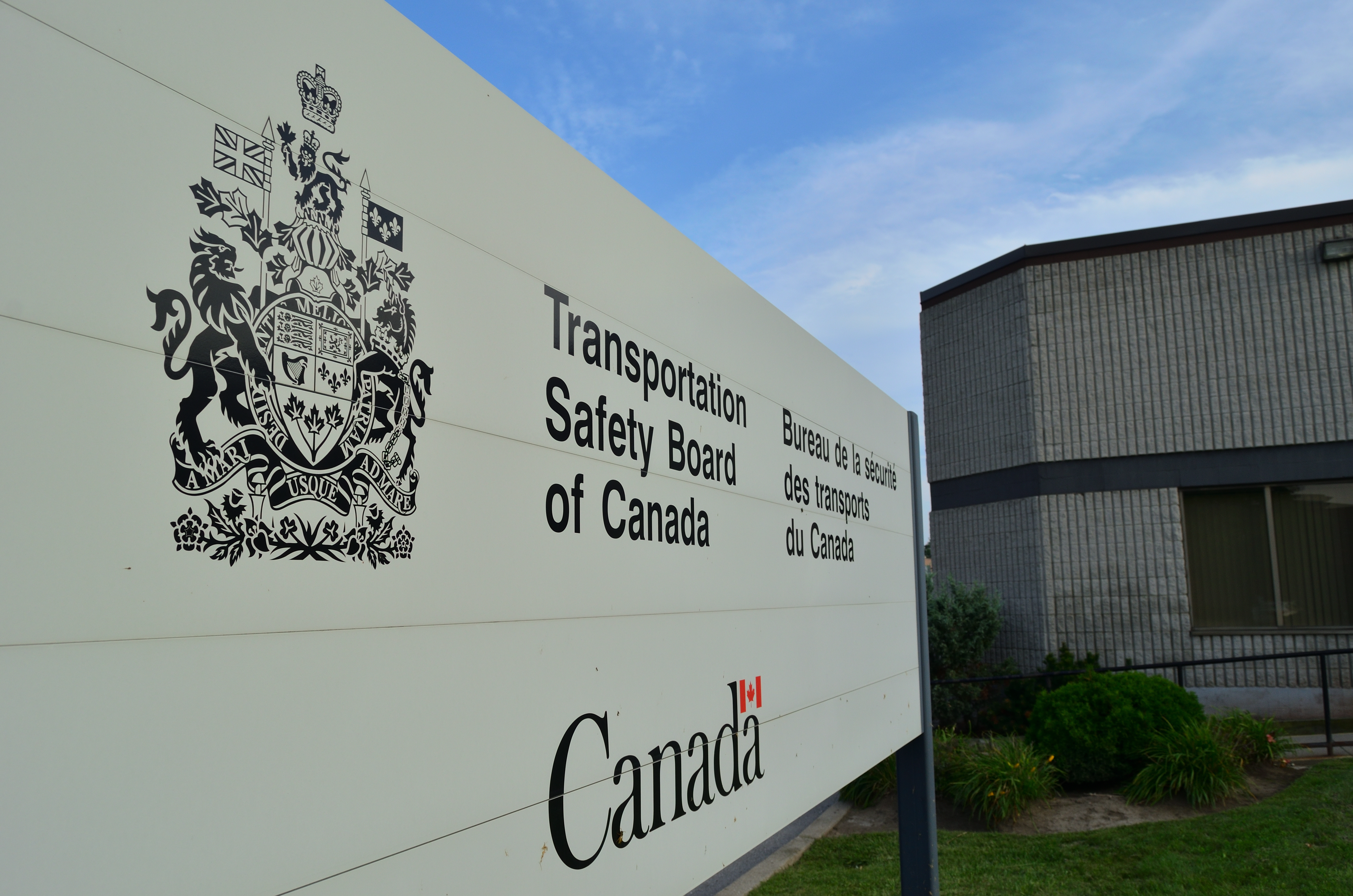
Transportation Safety Board of Canada office in Richmond Hill, Ontario

The Transportation Safety Board of Canada (TSB, French: Bureau de la sécurité des transports du Canada, BST), officially the Canadian Transportation Accident Investigation and Safety Board (French: Bureau canadien d'enquête sur les accidents de transport et de la sécurité des transports) is the agency of the Government of Canada responsible for advancing transportation safety in Canada. It is accountable to Parliament directly through the President of the King’s Privy Council and the Minister of Intergovernmental and Northern Affairs and Internal Trade. The independent agency investigates accidents and makes safety recommendations in four modes of transportation: aviation, rail, marine and pipelines.

== Agency history ==
Prior to 1990, Transport Canada's Aircraft Accident Investigation Branch (French: Direction des enquêtes sur les accidents aériens, 1960–1984) and its successor the Canadian Aviation Safety Board (French: Bureau canadien de la sécurité aérienne) or CASB (1984–1990) were responsible for investigation of air incidents. Before 1990, investigations and actions were taken by Transport Canada and even after 1984 the findings from CASB were not binding for Transport Canada to respond to.

The TSB was created under the Canadian Transportation Accident Investigation and Safety Board Act (French: Loi sur le Bureau canadien d’enquête sur les accidents de transport et de la sécurité des transports), which received royal assent in June 1989 and came into force March 29, 1990. It was formed in response to a number of high-profile accidents, following which the Government of Canada identified the need for an independent, multi-modal investigation agency. The headquarters are located in Place du Centre in Gatineau, Quebec.

The provisions of the Canadian Transportation Accident Investigation and Safety Board Act were written to establish an independent relationship between the agency and the Government of Canada.

This agency's first major test came with the crash of Swissair Flight 111 on September 2, 1998, the largest single aviation accident on Canadian territory since the 1985 crash of Arrow Air Flight 1285R. The TSB delivered its report on the accident on March 27, 2003, some 4½ years after the accident and at a cost of $57 million, making it the most complex and costly accident investigation in Canadian history to that date.

From 2005 to 2010, the TSB concluded a number of investigations into high-profile accidents, including:

- the crash of Air France Flight 358;
- the Cheakamus River derailment;
- the sinking of Queen of the North;
- the loss overboard of a crewmember of Picton Castle;
- the Burnaby pipeline rupture;
- the crash of Cougar Helicopters Flight 91;
- the sinking of Concordia.

To increase the uptake of its recommendations and address accident patterns, the TSB launched its Watchlist in 2010, which points to nine critical safety issues troubling Canada's transportation system.

On 3 December 2013, in the wake of the Lac-Mégantic rail disaster the previous July, it was reported that the number of runaway trains was triple the number documented by the TSB.

In August 2014, the TSB released the report on its investigation into the July 2013 Lac-Mégantic derailment. In a news conference, then TSB chair Wendy Tadros described how eighteen factors played a role in the disaster including a "weak safety culture" at the now-defunct Montreal, Maine & Atlantic Railways with "a lack of standards, poor training and easily punctured tanks." The TSB also blamed Transport Canada, the regulator, for not doing thorough safety audits often enough on railways "to know how those companies were really managing, or not managing, risk." The TSB report called for "physical restraints, such as wheel chocks, for parked trains." Prior to the accident TSB had called for "new and more robust wagons for flammable liquids" but as of August 2014, little progress had been made in implementing this.

On February 4, 2019, the TSB deployed to the derailment of Canadian Pacific Railway (CP) train 301-349. Ninety-nine cars and two locomotives derailed at Mile 130.6 of the CP Laggan Subdivision, near Field, British Columbia (BC) while proceeding westward to Vancouver, BC. The three train crewmembers – a locomotive engineer, a conductor, and a conductor trainee – died as a result.

During the course of its investigation into the derailment, the organization issued two safety advisories on April 11, 2019 to Transport Canada. The first called attention to the need for effective safety procedures to be applied to all trains stopped in emergency on both "heavy grades" and "mountain grades" and the second highlighted the need to review the efficacy of the inspection and maintenance procedures for grain hopper cars used in CP's unit grain train operations (and for other railways as applicable), and ensure that these cars can be operated safely at all times.

In January 2020, the Senior Investigator was reassigned in order to protect the integrity and objectivity of the investigation after voicing an opinion implying civil or criminal liability. The TSB labelled the comments made to The Fifth Estate journalists as "completely inappropriate" as the mandate of the TSB is to make findings as to causes and contributing factors of a transportation occurrence, but not to assign fault or determine civil or criminal liability. The CBC documentary pointed out what seemed to be a problem, where the private police service of CP Rail investigated the accident. A CPPS officer also resigned over these circumstances.

== Mandate and direction ==
The Transportation Safety Board's mandate is to

- conduct independent investigations, including public inquiries when necessary, into selected transportation occurrences in order to make findings as to their causes and contributing factors;
- identify safety deficiencies, as evidenced by transportation occurrences;
- make recommendations designed to eliminate or reduce any such safety deficiencies; and
- report publicly on its investigations and on the related findings

The TSB may assist other transportation safety boards in their investigations. This may happen when:

- an incident or accident occurs involving a Canadian-registered aircraft in commercial or air transport use;
- an incident or accident occurs involving a Canadian-built aircraft (or an aircraft with Canadian-built engines, propellers, or other vital components) in commercial or air transport use;
- a country without the technical ability to conduct a full investigation asks for the TSB's assistance (especially in the field of reading and analyzing the content of flight recorders).

Provincial and territorial governments may call upon the TSB to investigate occurrences. However, it is up to the TSB whether or not to proceed with an investigation. Public reports are published following class one, class two, class three and class four investigations. Recommendations made by the TSB are not legally binding upon the Government of Canada, nor any of its Ministers of departments. However, when a recommendation is made to a federal department, a formal response must be presented to the TSB within 90 days.

The TSB reports to the Parliament of Canada through the President of the King's Privy Council for Canada.

== Board membership ==
As of May 2026, the Board was composed of the following five members:

- Chair Yoan Marier
- Ken Potter
- Paul Dittmann
- Leo Donatti
- Louise Smolska

== Facilities ==
The TSB Engineering Laboratory, which has the facilities for performing mechanical, electrical, materials and voice/data recorder analysis in support of transportation accidents and incidents, is located in Ottawa, adjacent to the Ottawa International Airport.

== List of chairs ==
- John W. Stants 1990–1996
- Benoît Bouchard 1996–2001
- Charles H. Simpson 2001–2002 (acting)
- Camille Thériault 2002–2004
- Charles H. Simpson 2004–2005 (acting)
- Wendy A. Tadros 2005–2006 (acting)
- Wendy A. Tadros 2006–2014
- Kathleen Fox 2014–2024
- Yoan Marier 2024–present

== See also ==
- Aviation safety
