= Camille Thériault =

Premier of New Brunswick from 1998 to 1999

Camille Thériault CM
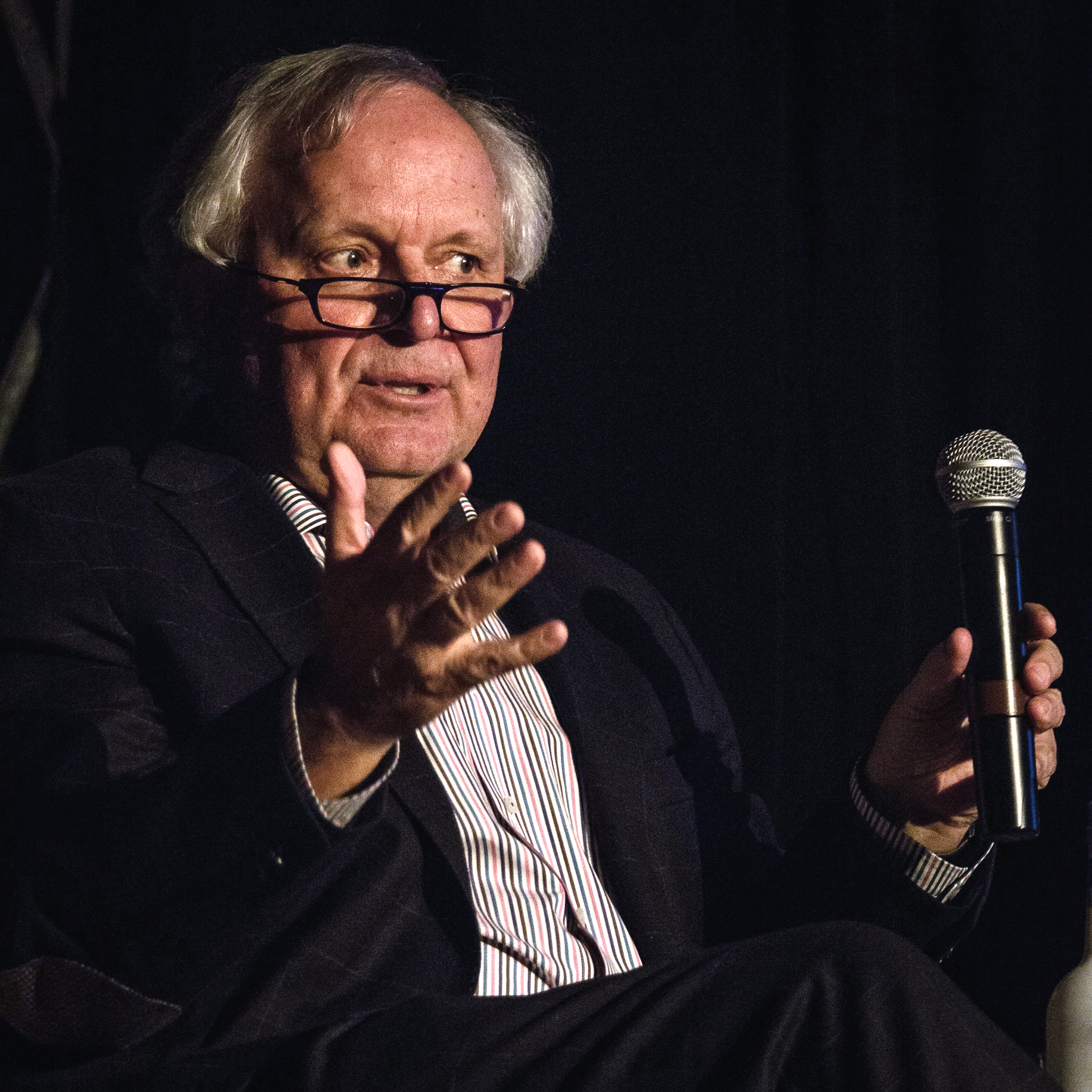
- Thériault in 2017

2nd Chair of the Transportation Safety Board
- In office 2002–2004
- Preceded by: Benoît Bouchard
- Succeeded by: Wendy A. Tadros

29th Premier of New Brunswick
- In office May 14, 1998 – June 21, 1999
- Monarch: Elizabeth II
- Lieutenant Governor: Marilyn T. Counsell
- Preceded by: Ray Frenette
- Succeeded by: Bernard Lord

MLA for Kent South
- In office October 13, 1987 – March 20, 2001
- Preceded by: Omer Léger
- Succeeded by: Claude Williams

New Brunswick Leader of the Opposition
- In office October 27, 1987 – September 23, 1991
- Preceded by: Frank McKenna
- Succeeded by: Danny Cameron

Personal details
- Born: Camille Henri Thériault; February 25, 1955 (age 71) Baie-Sainte-Anne, New Brunswick, Canada
- Party: Liberal
- Spouse: Gisèle Thériault

Camille Henri Thériault CM (born February 25, 1955) is a Canadian politician from New Brunswick. He served as the 29th premier of New Brunswick from 1998 to 1999.

== Early life ==
The son of Joséphine Martin and Norbert Thériault, a former provincial cabinet minister and Canadian Senator, Camille Thériault was born in Baie-Sainte-Anne, New Brunswick, and graduated from École Régionale de Baie Sainte-Anne. He then obtained a bachelor of social science degree with a major in political science from the Université de Moncton.

== Political career ==
Thériault was first elected to the Legislative Assembly of New Brunswick in the 1987 provincial election that saw the Liberal Party, of which he was a member, win every seat in the province.

Due to the unusual situation of leading a government with no parliamentary opposition, Premier Frank McKenna named backbench members of his caucus to form a shadow cabinet. Thériault was the leader of this "unofficial opposition", which met daily when the house was in session to prepare questions of Question Period of which the ministers would be given no notice.

Following the 1991 election, some balance was restored to the legislature with the opposition parties holding 12 of 58 seats and the "unofficial opposition" was not continued. Thériault was named to cabinet as Minister of Fisheries. In 1994, he was appointed Minister of Advanced Education and Labour

Thériault was re-elected in 1995 and became Minister of Economic Development—a key role in the McKenna government.

When McKenna announced his resignation in 1997, Thériault, who was long expected to be the favourite in the race to succeed McKenna as Liberal leader, ceded the early position of front-runner to charismatic Finance Minister Edmond Blanchard. However, Blanchard soon dropped out of the race.

Thériault left cabinet to campaign for the leadership of the Liberals, as did his two opponents, Education Minister Bernard Richard and junior cabinet minister Greg Byrne. Byrne, a relative unknown before the race, caught momentum during the race, though Thériault managed to win on the first ballot. As leader of the governing Liberals, he soon became premier.

He rejigged the cabinet upon being sworn in, changing some departments and decreasing its overall size. He pledged to bring in many new programs, focussing on social services, in contrast to the fiscal conservatism of McKenna, but felt he should win a mandate of his own before instituting any major changes.

The opposition Progressive Conservatives had themselves just chosen a leader, the young Bernard Lord, an unknown with no political experience. Thériault waited for Lord to contest a seat for the legislature and get some experience in the House before calling a vote. In doing so, Thériault gave up one of the key advantages of the incumbency, letting it be widely known months in advance that the election would be held in June 1999.

Thériault and his Liberals seemed to have underestimated Lord's Conservatives over whom they enjoyed a double-digit lead in early opinion polls. In the early days of the campaign, Lord reversed his earlier position, shared with the government, supporting highway tolls on the new divided route from Fredericton to Moncton. Lord used his new pledge to remove the tolls as the centrepiece of his campaign, he effectively used the issue as the prime example for the arrogance of the government and also incorporated his pledge into his "200 Days of Change" promise—20 key commitments Lord said he would implement within his first 200 days in office.

Thériault largely ignored Lord's surging campaign as he felt the Liberals would easily cruise to victory—a feeling mirrored in polls right up until the last week. On June 7, election, the Tories won their largest victory ever, taking 44 of 55 seats. Thériault's concession speech was very gracious and was seen as probably his best of the campaign. He remarked that "the people have spoken, and the people are never wrong." In that election, the Liberals were reduced from 45 seats to just 10.

Thériault stayed on as leader of the opposition and was seen as effective in the role. Despite this, the Liberals lost two by-elections in early 2001 that had been vacated by former Liberal cabinet ministers moving to federal politics. In March of that year, Thériault resigned his seat and as leader of the Liberals.

Following his resignation as party leader, then-Prime Minister Jean Chrétien appointed him to the Transportation Safety Board, and within the year he was named its chairman. In 2004, he was named president of the Mouvement des caisses populaires acadiennes (now UNI Financial Cooperation).

Thériault mused briefly about running in the 2004 federal election but opted not to.

Party political offices
Preceded by Bernard Lord	Opposition Leader in the New Brunswick Legislature; 1999–2001	Succeeded by Bernard Richard
Preceded by Ray Frenette	Leader of the New Brunswick Liberals; 1998–2001	Succeeded by Bernard Richard
