= Victor Boudreau =

Canadian politician

The Honourable Victor Boudreau
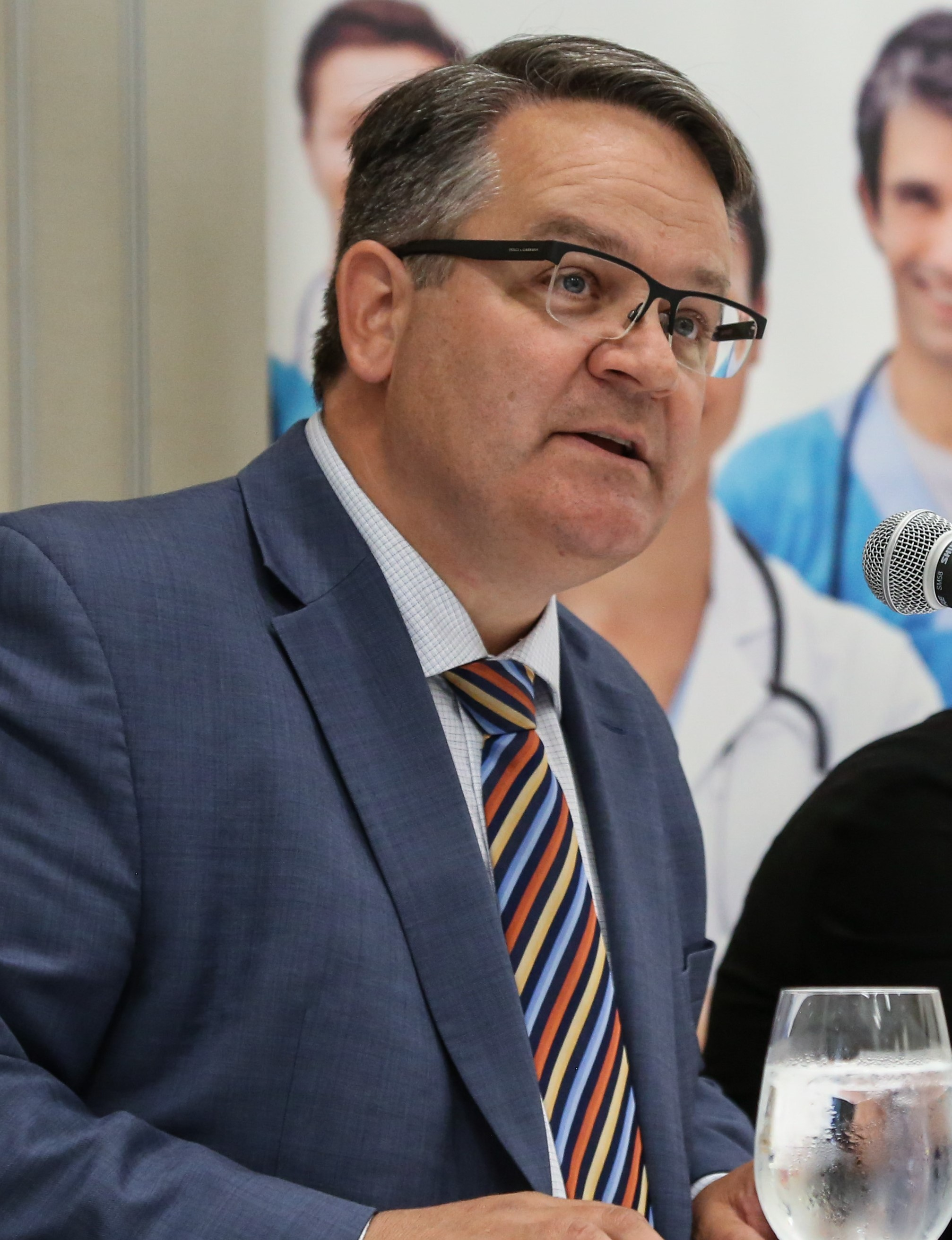
- Boudreau in 2017

Canadian Senator from New Brunswick
- Incumbent
- Assumed office June 28, 2024
- Nominated by: Justin Trudeau
- Appointed by: Mary Simon
- Preceded by: Percy Mockler

Minister of Health
- In office October 7, 2014 – September 5, 2017
- Premier: Brian Gallant
- Preceded by: Ted Flemming
- Succeeded by: Benoît Bourque

Leader of the Opposition (New Brunswick)
- In office November 10, 2010 – April 30, 2013
- Preceded by: David Alward
- Succeeded by: Brian Gallant

Minister of Finance
- In office October 3, 2006 – June 22, 2009
- Premier: Shawn Graham
- Preceded by: Jeannot Volpé
- Succeeded by: Greg Byrne

Member of the New Brunswick Legislative Assembly for Shediac-Cap-Pelé
- In office October 4, 2004 – September 22, 2014
- Preceded by: Bernard Richard
- Succeeded by: riding redistributed

Member of the New Brunswick Legislative Assembly for Shediac-Beaubassin-Cap-Pelé
- In office September 22, 2014 – September 24, 2018
- Preceded by: first member
- Succeeded by: Jacques LeBlanc

Personal details
- Born: May 3, 1970 (age 56)
- Party: Liberal
- Spouse: Michelle Arsenault
- Education: Université de Moncton

Victor Eric Boudreau (born May 3, 1970) is a New Brunswick politician. He was a member of the Legislative Assembly of New Brunswick from 2004 to 2018, representing the ridings of Shediac-Cap-Pelé and Shediac-Beaubassin-Cap-Pelé for the New Brunswick Liberal Association, and was the Leader of the Opposition in the legislature. In 2023, Boudreau was appointed as the chief administrative officer for the Town of Shediac. In 2024, he was appointed to the Senate of Canada on the advice of Prime Minister Justin Trudeau.

== Biography ==
Boudreau holds a Bachelor of Social Science from the Université de Moncton.

Boudreau was recruited to the Liberal Party in 1989 by Dominic LeBlanc and he attended the 1990 federal Liberal leadership convention to support Jean Chrétien. Chrétien, who was then without a seat in the House of Commons of Canada, ran in a by-election in Boudreau's riding of Beauséjour.

Following this initial engagement, Boudreau became very active in politics. He served as president of the Young Liberals and then worked for Fernand Robichaud when he was a member of the Cabinet of Canada and for Bernard Richard—his predecessor as MLA for Shediac-Cap-Pelé—when he was in the New Brunswick cabinet

Prior to his election to the legislature, he worked as village administrator of Cap-Pelé.

=== Career as legislator ===
He was elected to the legislature in a by-election on October 4, 2004, to replace Bernard Richard, who had resigned to become the provincial ombudsman. Boudreau role of Health & Wellness critic in the shadow cabinet shortly after his election.

==== Graham ministry ====
He was re-elected in 2006 and took on the role of finance minister in the cabinet of Shawn Graham. Boudreau was given several additional responsibilities, both ministerial and non-ministerial.

==== Back in opposition ====
Following the Liberal party's defeat in the 2010 election, Boudreau was named interim leader of the party on November 10, 2010, after Graham stepped down. Brian Gallant was elected leader of the party on October 27, 2012, and assumed the role of opposition leader when he won the district of Kent in a by-election on April 15, 2013.

==== Gallant ministry ====
He was named Minister of Health by Premier-elect Brian Gallant on 7 October 2014. He chaired the Strategic Program Review, which was designed to solve a large gap, between $485 million and $600 million in the account books of the province.

==== Senate of Canada ====
On June 28, 2024, he was summoned to the Senate of Canada by Governor General Mary Simon, on the advice of prime minister Justin Trudeau.

New Brunswick provincial government of Shawn Graham
Cabinet posts (3)
| Predecessor | Office | Successor |
|---|---|---|
| Greg Byrne | Minister of Business New Brunswick; 2009–2010 | Paul Robichaud |
| Jeannot Volpé | Minister of Finance; 2006–2009 | Greg Byrne |
| Rose-May Poirier | Minister of Local Government; 2006–2007 | Carmel Robichaud |
Special Cabinet Responsibilities
| Predecessor | Title | Successor |
| Kirk MacDonald | Minister responsible for the Red tape Reduction; 2006–2010 | none |
| Roly MacIntyre | Minister responsible for the Regional Development Corporation; 2008–2010 | Paul Robichaud |
| Greg Byrne | Minister responsible for Communications New Brunswick; 2009–2010 | Margaret-Ann Blaney |
| Greg Byrne | Minister responsible for Service New Brunswick; 2009–2010 | Bruce Fitch |
| Greg Byrne | Minister responsible for the Population Growth Secretariat; 2009–2010 | Donald Arseneault |
