= Jacques LeBlanc (politician) =

Canadian politician

Jacques LeBlanc MLA

New Brunswick Chief Government Whip
- Incumbent
- Assumed office October 21, 2024
- Preceded by: Mike Dawson

Member of the New Brunswick Legislative Assembly for Shediac-Cap-Acadie , Shediac-Beaubassin-Cap-Pelé
- Incumbent
- Assumed office September 24, 2018
- Preceded by: Victor Boudreau

Personal details
- Party: Liberal

Jacques Joseph LeBlanc is a Canadian politician, who was elected to the Legislative Assembly of New Brunswick in the 2018 election. He represents the electoral district of Shediac-Beaubassin-Cap-Pelé as a member of the Liberal Party.

LeBlanc was re-elected in the 2020 provincial election. As of September 8, 2024, he serves as the Official Opposition critic for Fisheries and Aquaculture & Agriculture.

Prior to his election to the legislature, LeBlanc served as mayor of Shediac.

== Electoral record ==
2024 New Brunswick general election: Shediac-Cap-Acadie
Party	Candidate	Votes	%	±%
Liberal	Jacques LeBlanc	5,438	56.3%	+2.6
Green	Jean Bourgeois	2,901	30.0%	+3.4
Progressive Conservative	Christine Arsenault	1,322	13.7%	-6.1
Total valid votes		9,661		
Total rejected ballots				
Turnout				
Eligible voters				
Liberal hold		Swing		
Source: Elections New Brunswick

2020 New Brunswick general election
Party	Candidate	Votes	%	±%
Liberal	Jacques LeBlanc	4,949	53.67	-9.87
Green	Gilles Cormier	2,453	26.60	+17.07
Progressive Conservative	Marie-Paule Martin	1,820	19.74	-2.60
Total valid votes		9,222	100.00	
Total rejected ballots		37	0.40	-0.13
Turnout		9,259	70.80	-1.17
Eligible voters		13,078		
Liberal hold		Swing		-13.47
Source: Elections New Brunswick

2018 New Brunswick general election
Party	Candidate	Votes	%	±%
Liberal	Jacques LeBlanc	5,919	63.54	+3.35
Progressive Conservative	Marcel Doiron	2,081	22.34	+3.52
Green	Greta Doucet	888	9.53	+1.40
New Democratic	Lise Potvin	428	4.59	-8.27
Total valid votes		9,316	99.47	
Total rejected ballots		50	0.53	-0.02
Turnout		9,366	72.22	-0.93
Eligible voters		12,969		
Liberal hold		Swing		-0.09
