= Benoît Bourque =

Canadian politician

Benoît Bourque MLA
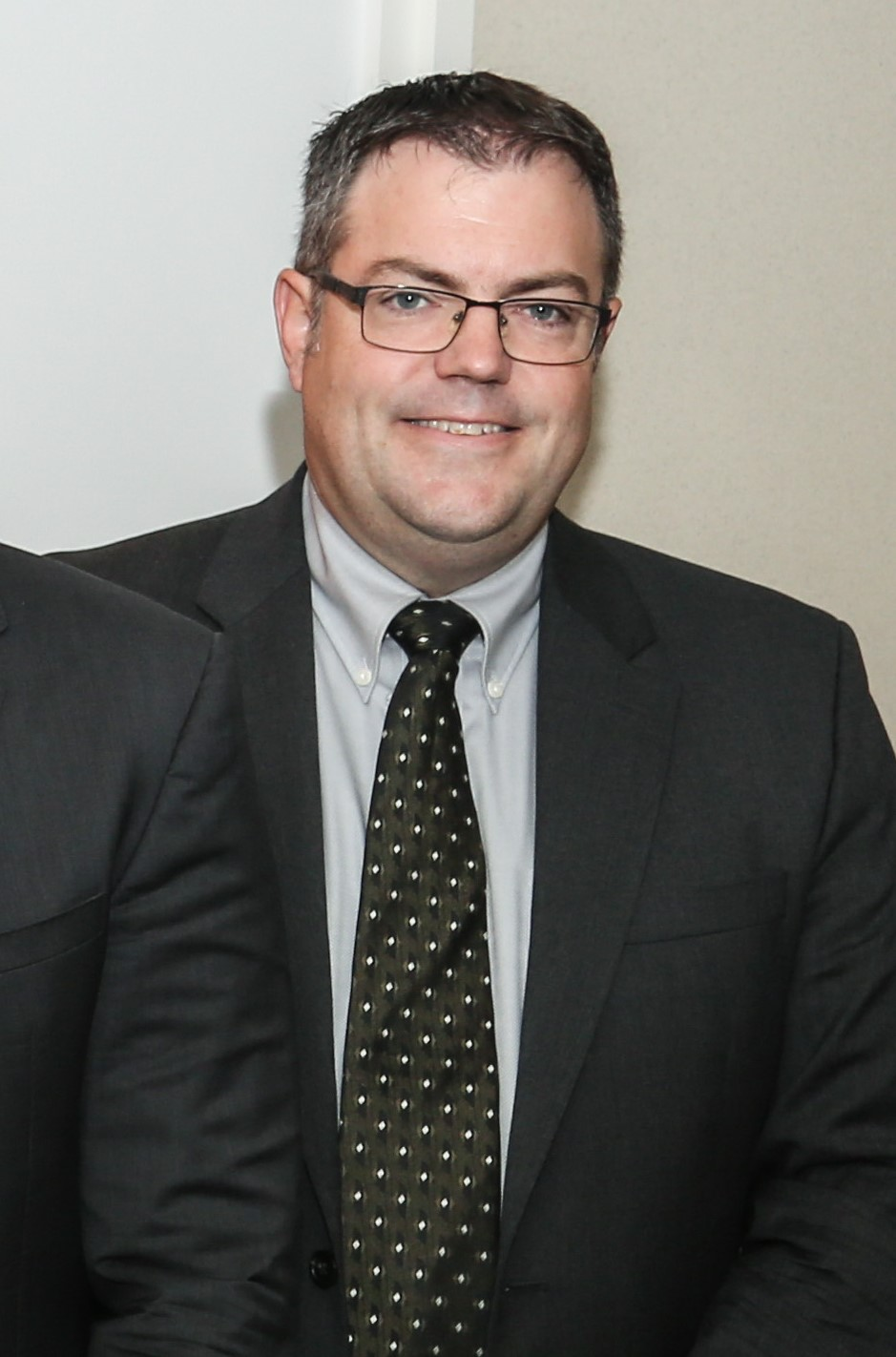
- Bourque in 2017

Member of the New Brunswick Legislative Assembly for Kent South
- Incumbent
- Assumed office September 22, 2014
- Preceded by: Claude Williams

Personal details
- Party: Liberal

Benoît Bourque is a Canadian politician, who was elected to the Legislative Assembly of New Brunswick in the 2014 provincial election. He represents the electoral district of Kent South as a member of the Liberal Party.

Bourque was named Chairman of the Select Committee on Cannabis, pursuant to Motion 31 of the 3rd session of the 58th New Brunswick Legislature.

Bourque was re-elected in the 2018 and 2020 provincial elections.

As of September 8, 2024, he serves as the Official Opposition critic for Education and Early Childhood Development, as well as for la Francophonie and the Official Languages Act.

New Brunswick provincial government of Brian Gallant
Cabinet post (1)
| Predecessor | Office | Successor |
|---|---|---|
| Victor Boudreau | Minister of Health; September 5, 2017– | Incumbent |
