= Azor LeBlanc =

Canadian politician (1927–2011)

Azor LeBlanc (October 27, 1927 - July 31, 2011) was a business owner and political figure in New Brunswick, Canada. He represented Shediac in the Legislative Assembly of New Brunswick from 1974 to 1991 as a Liberal member.

He was born in Cap-Pelé, New Brunswick, the son of Thaddée LeBlanc, and educated at St. Joseph's College. In 1948, he married Rose Leger with whom he had ten children. LeBlanc owned and operated a drive-in, motel and store. He served on the council for Westmorland County.

LeBlanc died at the Dr. Georges-L.-Dumont University Hospital Centre in Moncton, New Brunswick on July 31, 2011, after suffering from cancer for 33 years.
