= Early immersion (foreign-language instruction) =

Early immersion is a method of teaching and learning a foreign language. It entails having a student undergo intense instruction in a foreign language, starting by age five or six. Frequently, this method entails having the student learn all or much of his or her various "regular" subject matter (such as mathematics and science) via the foreign language being taught.

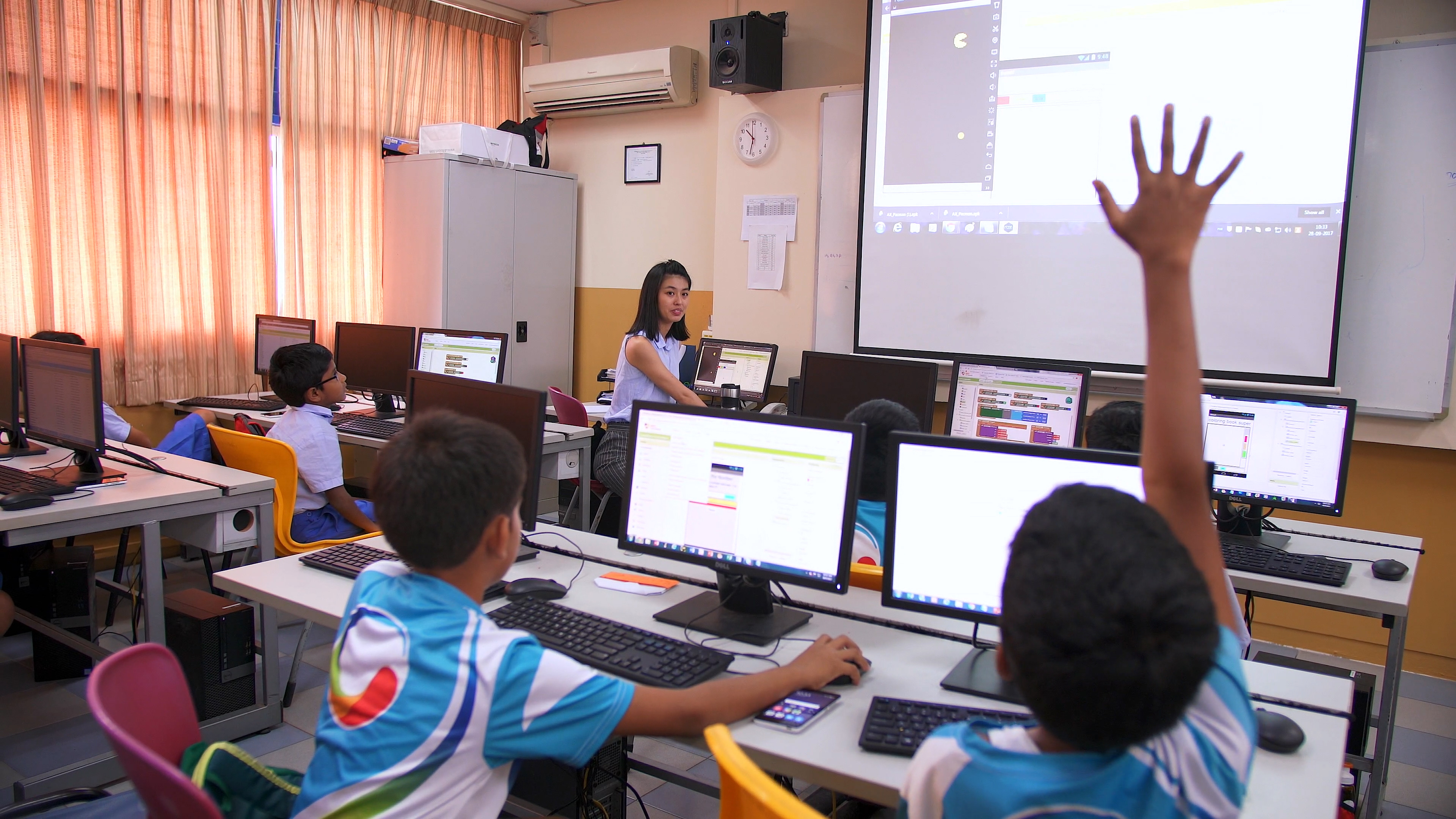
A classroom in Singapore, where children are taught their subjects in a language other than their mother tongue from preschool onwards. It is an example of 'early immersion'.

Bilingualism has been associated with a vast array of cognitive advantages. It often develops as a result of experiential factors that shape an individual's upbringing. People who are bilingual have been found to possess greater navigation ability with respect to diseases like Alzheimer's and exhibit greater competence when it comes to internal mental processes such as memory and self-control. These positive outcomes associated with being bilingual serve as a motivational factor underlying what is known as "bilingual education", wherein children's education is conducted using not one but two languages. Immersion in a foreign language, as defined above, is a subtype within the realm of bilingual education as a tool that effectively promotes proficiency in two languages.

It has been found that students enrolled in an early-immersion program learn the language being taught at an almost-native proficiency by age 11. Such students do show a lagging behind their peers (that is, those peers who are not enrolled in an early-immersion program) in reading, spelling, punctuation, mathematics, and science for the first few years. However, such immersion-enrolled students do eventually catch up with their peers in the aforementioned areas.

Early immersion is considered a helpful tool to facilitate the reinstatement of languages that are approaching dormancy. It also has been found to have implications for strengthening and urging the prevalence of historic region-specific languages. This approach has its drawbacks such as intricacies relating to ideological perspectives, uniformity across different levels of education and resource allocation. These must be acknowledged while dealing with its application. However, overall, as a technique, early immersion, in the context of learning and being able to communicate using more than one language, has been broken down and explored through different lenses as well as critically considered.

== The beginning of early immersion ==
The roots of early immersion in light of acquisition of foreign languages can be traced to a school in Saint-Lambert, Canada, during the 1960s. French, as a language, possessed popularity within the cultural context of the region. This, however, was not adequately translated in terms of the capability of certain sections of the population to speak the language. The language was rapidly gaining importance in the legal and social realm and its educational dimension as simply another subject in school was proving to be insufficient. Hence, in light of these developments, the parents in this region advocated for a shift towards inclusion of French as a medium of instruction to boost the children's abilities in the same. The adoption of this demand serves as a pilot programme and starting point in an understanding of early immersion. This scheme labelled English and French as 'L1' and 'L2' and used an integrative approach wherein 'L2' served as the base language for teaching other subjects just like 'L1'.

== Underlying phenomena ==
=== Why and how language is acquired ===
The ability to acquire languages and comprehend its nuances such as grammatical complications is an innate one that young children possess. It is believed to have developed as a consequence of the convergence of years of social learning wherein cues are effectively transmitted across cultures and evolutionary pressures, i.e. circumstances in response to which our mechanisms and physicality develop.

According to Noam Chomsky, there exists a 'language-acquisition device' as an explanation of the process by which people learn languages. This model elaborates on a generalised framework for the same and is widely supported. It is said to be most proactive in the initial phase of life.

=== Two types of bilingualism and second language learning ===
People who have the ability to communicate using two languages, i.e. bilinguals can be classified as 'sequential bilinguals' and 'simultaneous bilinguals'. The former learn two languages in a specific order or one after the other, whereas the latter adopt both languages in tandem with each other, early in life, at an equal magnitude. The former have a tendency to display greater ability in the language they developed first whereas the latter are more likely to attain equal levels of competence in both languages. This is the strand of bilingualism drawn on by early immersion.

Second-language acquisition examines the processes underlying engagement with a language other than one's native language and delves into how this varies across different stages of life. It gained prevalence as a realm of study at a similar time to when early immersion programmes were introduced in Canada.

=== Critical period hypothesis ===
Demarcations of timeframes within the human lifespan within which individuals are most susceptible to absorbing or developing different 'faculties' is very common when it comes to breaking down several phenomena. These absorbent 'critical periods' or 'sensitive periods' extend to the realm of 'language acquisition' wherein it is argued that this ability is stronger during particular stages of life. Most often, early childhood is identified as that stage in the above context.

Various theories have been purported as to why early childhood is the "easiest" time to learn a language – the developmental period when language seems to be "absorbed" as opposed to "learned". However, much debate still remains as to how the brain acquires language, including why the brain seems to have the easiest time with it in early childhood.

== Impact assessment ==
=== Benefits of early immersion ===
In a 1994 paper of the University of California, Berkeley, Fred Genesee drew on existing research and experiences relating to early immersion in terms of learning languages to depict the key themes that can be ascertained within this field. He found, based on his own past research, that this learning technique produced greater language capability than any other language instruction methods. For example, that of memorising grammar rules for the sole purpose of writing an exam to prove proficiency in that language itself. According to him, this tendency can be explained by the fact that learning the language is made more appealing to the students since it can serve as a means of self-expression and be interesting. Thus, learning the language itself is not the end goal.

It was also found, based on Genesee's past research, that engaging in learning a second language through the early immersion technique does not have a detrimental impact on the children's capacity for attaining proficiency in their first language.

=== Criticisms ===
It has been found that, in contrast to the positive side of early immersion discussed above, there also exist numerous criticisms that must be kept in mind while thinking about it as a language acquisition technique. For instance, in 'The Pellerin and Hammerly Study' that was aimed at evaluating the abilities of children who had learnt languages through this technique for a prolonged time period, beginning early in life, it was found that even among such children there exists a potential for significant inaccuracies while speaking the foreign language.

Additionally, through the 'Spilka Study', wherein the proficiency of native speakers and early immersion students was compared, it was found that children who learnt through the early immersion path still displayed considerable patterns of error in their speech when compared to native speakers of the language.

== See also ==
- Language immersion
- Language acquisition
