= Omer Léger =

American-born Canadian politician (1931–2023)

- Born: March 31, 1931; Gardner, Massachusetts, U.S.
- Died: June 23, 2023 (aged 92)
- Education: University of St. Joseph's College
- Occupations: Merchant and politician
- Spouse: Dolores Bourque
- Children: 4

Omer Léger (March 27, 1931 – June 23, 2023) was an American-born Canadian merchant and politician.

Léger served in the Legislative Assembly of New Brunswick having replaced former premier Louis J. Robichaud and having his final provincial election defeat at the hands of future Premier Camille Thériault.

== Life and career ==
Omer Léger was born in Gardner, Massachusetts and studied at St. Joseph's College in Memramcook, New Brunswick. He became an administrator for the Assomption Mutuelle insurance company.

Léger was first elected in a 1971 by-election in the Kent riding to replace Robichaud who had accepted an appointment as chairman of the International Joint Commission following his party's defeat in the 1970 provincial election. He was the first Progressive Conservative to be elected in the traditionally Liberal Kent County in almost 60 years. Léger almost immediately joined the cabinet of Richard Hatfield. He served as provincial secretary until the 1974 election, where he was re-elected in the Kent South riding, when he added minister of Fisheries to his portfolio. He was defeated in the 1978 election by Liberal Bertin Leblanc, when the Progressive Conservatives barely squeaked by a victory at 30 seats against 28 for the Liberal Party.

Léger made a comeback in the 1982 election, again in the Kent South riding and defeating Bertin Leblanc. The Progressive Conservatives won a resounding mandate that year, winning 39 of 58 seats. He rejoined the cabinet as minister of Tourism and served in that role until his and his party's defeat in the 1987 when the Liberals swept every seat in the province. In that election he was defeated by future Premier Camille Thériault.

Léger ran unsuccessfully as a Progressive Conservative in the 1988 federal election in the riding of Beauséjour. He took 27.24% of the vote and was defeated by sitting MP Fernand Robichaud, who took 58.61%. Léger would run again in the same riding in the 2006 federal election and the 2008 federal election, being defeated by Liberal Dominic Leblanc in both elections, taking 32.23% of the vote in 2006 and 29.15% of the vote in 2008.

Léger married Dolores Bourque and they had four children; Louis, Marcel, Anne and Nathalie. He died on June 23, 2023, at the age of 92.
