= Kent South =

Provincial electoral district in New Brunswick, Canada

New Brunswick electoral district
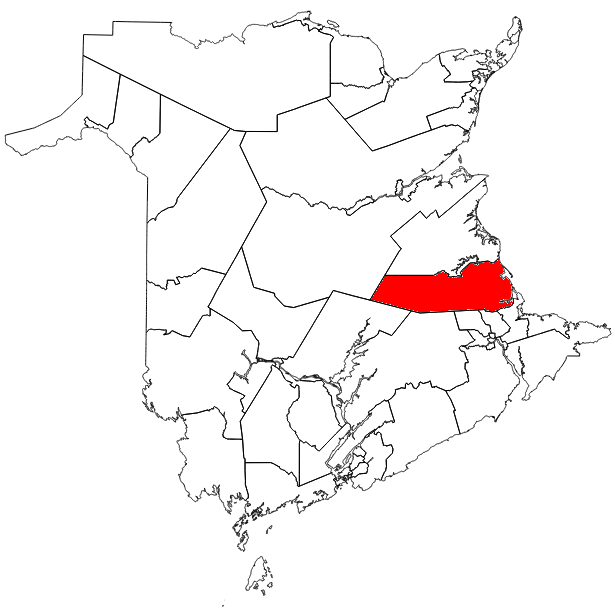
- The riding of Kent South (as it exists from 2014) in relation to other New Brunswick electoral districts.
- Coordinates: 46.407°N 64.991°W

Defunct provincial electoral district
- Legislature: Legislative Assembly of New Brunswick
- District created: 1973
- First contested: 1974
- Last contested: 2020

Demographics
- Population (2011): 15,414
- Electors (2010): 11,745

Kent South (French: Kent-Sud) was a provincial electoral district for the Legislative Assembly of New Brunswick, Canada.

It was originally created in 1973 with the southern third of Kent County, centered primarily around the town of Bouctouche. It was largely unchanged in the 1994 redistribution. In 2006 it lost the Bouctouche area to Kent. In the 2013 redistribution its northern half was merged with the southern half of Kent, causing it to regain Bouctouche and add several rural areas to its north, but lose much the extreme southern part of Kent County around Cocagne.

== Members of the Legislative Assembly ==
Assembly	Years	Member	Party
Riding created from Kent (1827–1974)
48th	1974–1978	Omer Léger	Progressive Conservative
49th	1978–1982	Bertin LeBlanc	Liberal
50th	1982–1987	Omer Léger	Progressive Conservative
51st	1987–1991	Camille Thériault	Liberal
52nd	1991–1995	Camille Thériault	Liberal
53rd	1995–1999	Camille Thériault	Liberal
54th	1999–2001	Camille Thériault	Liberal
54th	2001–2003	Claude Williams	Progressive Conservative
55th	2003–2006	Claude Williams	Progressive Conservative
56th	2006–2010	Claude Williams	Progressive Conservative
57th	2010–2014	Claude Williams	Progressive Conservative
58th	2014–2018	Benoît Bourque	Liberal
58th	2018–2020	Benoît Bourque	Liberal
60th	2020–Present	Benoît Bourque	Liberal
Riding dissolved into Beausoleil-Grand-Bouctouche-Kent, Champdoré-Irishtown, Fredericton-Grand Lake and Arcadia-Butternut Valley-Maple Hills

== Election results ==
2020 New Brunswick general election
Party	Candidate	Votes	%	±%
Liberal	Benoît Bourque	5,146	55.23	-5.70
Progressive Conservative	Bou Duplessis	2,817	30.23	+10.11
Green	Eva P. Rehak	994	10.67	-3.53
People's Alliance	Lisa Godin	243	2.61	New
New Democratic	Sue Shedd	118	1.27	-3.48
Total valid votes		9,318	100.00	
Total rejected ballots		50	0.53	+0.16
Turnout		9,368	75.21	+1.56
Eligible voters		12,456		
Liberal hold		Swing		-7.90
Source: Elections New Brunswick

2018 New Brunswick general election
Party	Candidate	Votes	%	±%
Liberal	Benoît Bourque	5,595	60.93	+12.27
Progressive Conservative	Ricky Gautreau	1,848	20.12	-13.63
Green	Alain Rousselle	1,304	14.20	+4.20
New Democratic	Serge Rémi Parent	436	4.75	-0.87
Total valid votes		9,183	99.69	
Total rejected ballots		34	0.37	
Turnout		9,217	73.65	
Eligible voters		12,514		
Liberal hold		Swing		+12.95

2014 New Brunswick general election
Party	Candidate	Votes	%	±%
Liberal	Benoît Bourque	4,637	48.66	+19.43
Progressive Conservative	Claude Williams	3,216	33.75	-26.62
Green	Tina Beers	953	10.00	+5.56
New Democratic	Paul Musgrave	535	5.61	-0.35
People's Alliance	Joël MacIntosh	188	1.97	–
Total valid votes		9,529	100.0	
Total rejected ballots		22	0.23	
Turnout		9,551	76.88	
Eligible voters		12,424		
Liberal notional gain from Progressive Conservative		Swing		+23.02
Source: Elections New Brunswick

2010 New Brunswick general election
Party	Candidate	Votes	%	±%
Progressive Conservative	Claude Williams	5,054	60.37	+1.83
Liberal	Martin Goguen	2,447	29.23	-12.23
New Democratic	Oscar Doucet	499	5.96	–
Green	Luc LeBreton	372	4.44	–
Total valid votes		8,372	100.0	
Total rejected ballots		60	0.71	
Turnout		8,432	78.26	
Eligible voters		10,775		
Progressive Conservative hold		Swing		+7.03
Source: Elections New Brunswick

2006 New Brunswick general election
Party	Candidate	Votes	%	±%
Progressive Conservative	Claude Williams	4,890	58.54	+7.52
Liberal	Nadine Hebert	3,463	41.46	-0.58
Total valid votes		8,353	100.0	
Progressive Conservative hold		Swing		+4.05

2003 New Brunswick general election
Party	Candidate	Votes	%	±%
Progressive Conservative	Claude Williams	4,933	51.02	-7.35
Liberal	Stephen Doucet	4,065	42.04	+5.38
New Democratic	Neil Gardner	671	6.94	+1.97
Total valid votes		9,669	100.0	
Progressive Conservative hold		Swing		-6.36

New Brunswick provincial by-election, 2001
Party	Candidate	Votes	%	±%
Progressive Conservative	Claude Williams	4,346	58.37	+18.20
Liberal	Lucille Haché Riedle	2,730	36.66	-10.92
New Democratic	Marguerite Girouard	370	4.97	-7.29
Total valid votes		7,446	100.0	
Progressive Conservative gain from Liberal		Swing		+14.56

1999 New Brunswick general election
Party	Candidate	Votes	%	±%
Liberal	Camille Thériault	4,546	47.58	-23.94
Progressive Conservative	Jean-Noël Allain	3,838	40.17	+20.07
New Democratic	Collette Doucette	1,171	12.26	+3.88
Total valid votes		9,555	100.0	
Liberal hold		Swing		-22.00

1995 New Brunswick general election
Party	Candidate	Votes	%	±%
Liberal	Camille Thériault	6,313	71.52	+8.56
Progressive Conservative	Charles Ryan	1,774	20.10	-2.75
New Democratic	Clifford Meunier	740	8.38	-5.81
Total valid votes		8,827	100.0	
Liberal hold		Swing		+5.66

1991 New Brunswick general election
Party	Candidate	Votes	%	±%
Liberal	Camille Thériault	5,573	62.96	+3.39
Progressive Conservative	Jean-Claude Cormier	2,023	22.85	-11.97
New Democratic	Gérald Mazerolle	1,256	14.19	+8.58
Total valid votes		8,852	100.0	
Liberal hold		Swing		+7.68

1987 New Brunswick general election
Party	Candidate	Votes	%	±%
Liberal	Camille Thériault	5,546	59.57	+17.15
Progressive Conservative	Omer Léger	3,242	34.82	-20.07
New Democratic	Gérald Mazerolle	522	5.61	+2.93
Total valid votes		9,310	100.0	
Liberal gain from Progressive Conservative		Swing		+18.61

1982 New Brunswick general election
Party	Candidate	Votes	%	±%
Progressive Conservative	Omer Léger	4,829	54.89	+12.27
Liberal	Bertin LeBlanc	3,732	42.42	-13.16
New Democratic	Gérald Mazerolle	236	2.68	–
Total valid votes		8,797	100.0	
Progressive Conservative gain from Liberal		Swing		+12.72

1978 New Brunswick general election
Party	Candidate	Votes	%	±%
Liberal	Bertin LeBlanc	4,276	55.58	+8.67
Progressive Conservative	Omer Léger	3,279	42.62	-8.45
Parti acadien	Dolan Surette	138	1.79	-0.22
Total valid votes		7,693	100.0	
Liberal gain from Progressive Conservative		Swing		+8.56

1974 New Brunswick general election
Party	Candidate	Votes	%
Progressive Conservative	Omer Léger	3,376	51.07
Liberal	? Bourgeois	3,101	46.91
Parti acadien	? Collette	133	2.01
Total valid votes		6,610	100.0
The previous multi-member riding of Kent elected 3 (of 3) Liberals in the previous election. Progressive Conservative candidate Omer Léger won in a 1971 by-election, and is one of three incumbents.
