= Wendy A. Tadros =

Wendy A. Tadros was the Transportation Safety Board of Canada (TSBC) Chairperson from 2006 to 2014. She was previously a board member, appointed on 1 July 1996.

As chairperson, Tadros was a senior appointee of the Government of Canada, and was responsible for accident investigations that may or may not have included fatalities, such as the tragedy of Lac-Megantic, of which Tadros stated that the "investigation will take months," and warned against blaming the Lac-Megantic tragedy on one person. She was quoted as saying that the Lac-Megantic derailment "may well be the most devastating rail accident in Canadian history."

She frequently appeared before legislators in Parliament in Ottawa, Ontario. A statement of the duties of the TSBC was provided by her on 13 June 2006 to the Standing Committee on Transport, Infrastructure and Communities.

She has been aware since at least 1997 of the problems of DOT-111 tank cars, and wrote in committee at the time that "the tank cars that lost product were all Class 111A cars, a class known to be susceptible to product loss at derailment." She returned to the subject of the DOT-111 tank cars in the investigation of a derailment near River Glade, New Brunswick when she wrote in committee that "Class 111A tank cars are more susceptible to release product upon derailment and impact than pressure tank cars, and yet there are a number of toxic and volatile liquids that are still permitted to be carried in minimum standard Class 111A tank cars."

She noted a failure of the safety regulations for the Transport of Dangerous Goods (TDG) in report R02W0063, issued 2004, that "Since the train originated and would have terminated in Canada, and the DG products were not listed in Schedule I of the TDG regulations, neither the shipper nor CN was required to have an emergency response plan."
