= Shediac-Beaubassin-Cap-Pelé =

Provincial electoral district in New Brunswick, Canada

New Brunswick electoral district
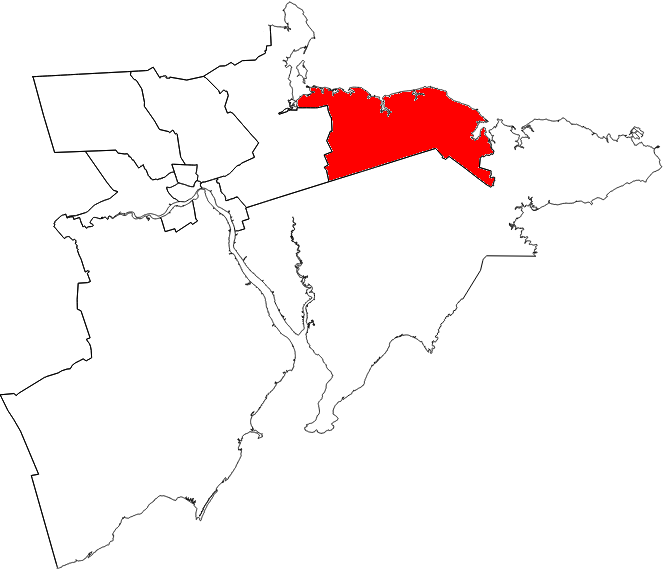
- The riding of Shediac-Beaubassin-Cap-Pelé in relation to other southeastern New Brunswick electoral districts

Defunct provincial electoral district
- Legislature: Legislative Assembly of New Brunswick
- District created: 1973
- District abolished: 2023
- First contested: 1974
- Last contested: 2020

Demographics
- Population (2011): 15,172
- Electors (2013): 11,813

Shediac-Beaubassin-Cap-Pelé was a provincial electoral district for the Legislative Assembly of New Brunswick, Canada. It was created in 1973 as Shediac. Though it has had few geographic changes over the years, it has twice been renamed to more inclusively reflect the communities within its boundaries, first to Shediac-Cap-Pelé in 1994 and then to Shediac-Beaubassin-Cap-Pelé in 2013.

== Members of the Legislative Assembly ==
Assembly	Years	Member	Party
Shediac; Riding created from Westmorland
48th	1974–1978	Azor LeBlanc	Liberal
49th	1978–1982	Azor LeBlanc	Liberal
50th	1982–1987	Azor LeBlanc	Liberal
51st	1987–1991	Azor LeBlanc	Liberal
52nd	1991–1995	Bernard Richard	Liberal
Shediac-Cap-Pelé
53rd	1995–1999	Bernard Richard	Liberal
54th	1999–2003	Bernard Richard	Liberal
55th	2003–2004	Bernard Richard	Liberal
55th	2004–2006	Victor Boudreau	Liberal
56th	2006–2010	Victor Boudreau	Liberal
57th	2010–2014	Victor Boudreau	Liberal
Shediac-Beaubassin-Cap-Pelé
58th	2014–2018	Victor Boudreau	Liberal
58th	2018–2020	Jacques LeBlanc	Liberal
60th	2020–2024	Jacques LeBlanc	Liberal
Riding dissolved into Shediac-Cap-Acadie and Shediac Bay-Dieppe

== Election results ==
=== Shediac-Beaubassin-Cap-Pelé ===
2020 New Brunswick general election
Party	Candidate	Votes	%	±%
Liberal	Jacques LeBlanc	4,949	53.67	-9.87
Green	Gilles Cormier	2,453	26.60	+17.07
Progressive Conservative	Marie-Paule Martin	1,820	19.74	-2.60
Total valid votes		9,222	100.00	
Total rejected ballots		37	0.40	-0.13
Turnout		9,259	70.80	-1.17
Eligible voters		13,078		
Liberal hold		Swing		-13.47
Source: Elections New Brunswick

2018 New Brunswick general election
Party	Candidate	Votes	%	±%
Liberal	Jacques LeBlanc	5,919	63.54	+3.35
Progressive Conservative	Marcel Doiron	2,081	22.34	+3.52
Green	Greta Doucet	888	9.53	+1.40
New Democratic	Lise Potvin	428	4.59	-8.27
Total valid votes		9,316	99.47	
Total rejected ballots		50	0.53	-0.02
Turnout		9,366	71.97	
Eligible voters		13,014		
Liberal hold		Swing		-0.09

2014 New Brunswick general election
Party	Candidate	Votes	%	±%
Liberal	Victor Boudreau	5,496	60.18	-1.18
Progressive Conservative	Carmel Brun	1,718	18.81	-6.00
New Democratic	Bernice Boudreau	1,175	12.87	+5.05
Green	Charles Thibodeau	743	8.14	+3.35
Total valid votes		9,132	100.0	
Total rejected ballots		51	0.56	
Turnout		9,183	73.15	
Eligible voters		12,554		
Liberal notional hold		Swing		+2.41
Source: Elections New Brunswick

=== Shediac-Cap-Pelé ===
2010 New Brunswick general election
Party	Candidate	Votes	%	±%
Liberal	Victor Boudreau	5,243	61.36	+4.75
Progressive Conservative	Janice Brun	2,120	24.81	-15.45
New Democratic	Yves Leger	668	7.82	+4.69
Green	Natalie Arsenault	409	4.79	–
Independent	Charles Vautour	104	1.22	–
Total valid votes		8,544	100.0	
Total rejected ballots		91	1.05	
Turnout		8,635	73.48	
Eligible voters		11,751		
Liberal hold		Swing		+10.10
Source: Elections New Brunswick

2006 New Brunswick general election
Party	Candidate	Votes	%	±%
Liberal	Victor Boudreau	5,116	56.61	+1.00
Progressive Conservative	Léo Doiron	3,639	40.26	-4.13
New Democratic	Charles Vautour	283	3.13	–
Total valid votes		9,038	100.0	
Liberal hold		Swing		+2.56

New Brunswick provincial by-election, 2004
Party	Candidate	Votes	%	±%
Liberal	Victor Boudreau	5,042	55.61	-10.08
Progressive Conservative	Léo Doiron	4,025	44.39	+13.26
Total valid votes		9,067	100.0	
Liberal hold		Swing		-11.67

2003 New Brunswick general election
Party	Candidate	Votes	%	±%
Liberal	Bernard Richard	6,464	65.69	+7.36
Progressive Conservative	Odette Babineau	3,063	31.13	-3.73
New Democratic	Claudette Beland	313	3.18	-3.63
Total valid votes		9,840	100.0	
Liberal hold		Swing		+5.54

1999 New Brunswick general election
Party	Candidate	Votes	%	±%
Liberal	Bernard Richard	5,422	58.33	-23.47
Progressive Conservative	Odette Babineau	3,240	34.86	+23.04
New Democratic	Anne Marie Dupuis	633	6.81	+0.43
Total valid votes		9,295	100.0	
Liberal hold		Swing		-23.26

1995 New Brunswick general election
Party	Candidate	Votes	%	±%
Liberal	Bernard Richard	6,963	81.80	+7.70
Progressive Conservative	Jean-Claude Bourque	1,006	11.82	-0.77
New Democratic	John Gagnon	543	6.38	-2.05
Total valid votes		8,512	100.0	
Liberal hold		Swing		+4.24

=== Shediac ===
1991 New Brunswick general election
Party	Candidate	Votes	%	±%
Liberal	Bernard Richard	7,298	74.10	+3.07
Progressive Conservative	Emile Goguen Dupré	1,240	12.59	-7.94
New Democratic	Patrick Allain	830	8.43	-0.01
Confederation of Regions	Lester Russel Hyslop	481	4.88	–
Total valid votes		9,849	100.0	
Liberal hold		Swing		+5.50

1987 New Brunswick general election
Party	Candidate	Votes	%	±%
Liberal	Azor LeBlanc	7,219	71.03	+21.35
Progressive Conservative	Allard Robichaud	2,087	20.53	-26.32
New Democratic	Omer W. Bourgue	858	8.44	+5.80
Total valid votes		10,164	100.0	
Liberal hold		Swing		+23.84

1982 New Brunswick general election
Party	Candidate	Votes	%	±%
Liberal	Azor LeBlanc	5,135	49.68	-15.67
Progressive Conservative	Alfred Landry	4,842	46.85	+19.57
New Democratic	Henri-Eugène Duguay	273	2.64	–
Parti acadien	Omer Bourque	86	0.83	-6.55
Total valid votes		10,336	100.0	
Liberal hold		Swing		-17.62
New Democratic candidate Henri-Eugène Duguay lost 4.74 percentage points from his performance in 1978 running as a Parti acadien.

1978 New Brunswick general election
Party	Candidate	Votes	%	±%
Liberal	Azor LeBlanc	5,342	65.35	+5.69
Progressive Conservative	Régis Cormier	2,230	27.28	-6.44
Parti acadien	Henri-Eugène Duguay	603	7.38	+3.55
Total valid votes		8,175	100.0	
Liberal hold		Swing		+6.06

1974 New Brunswick general election
Party	Candidate	Votes	%
Liberal	Azor LeBlanc	4,404	59.66
Progressive Conservative	Nap Pellerin	2,489	33.72
Parti acadien	Bernard Richard	283	3.83
New Democratic	Ronald Vienneau	206	2.79
Total valid votes		7,382	100.0
The previous multi-member riding of Westmorland went totally Liberal in the previous election. Neither of the four incumbents ran in this election.
