= Results breakdown of the 2025 Canadian federal election =

2025 election for members of the Canadian Parliament's House of Commons

2025 Canadian federal election
- April 28, 2025
- All 343 seats in the House of Commons of Canada; 172 seats needed for a majority
- Turnout: 69.5%
Party	Leader	Vote %	Seats	+/–
Liberal	Mark Carney	43.76%	169	+9
Conservative	Pierre Poilievre	41.31%	144	+25
Bloc Québécois	Yves-François Blanchet	6.29%	22	−10
New Democratic	Jagmeet Singh	6.29%	7	−18
Green	Elizabeth May/Jonathan Pedneault	1.22%	1	−1
This lists parties that won seats. See the complete results below.
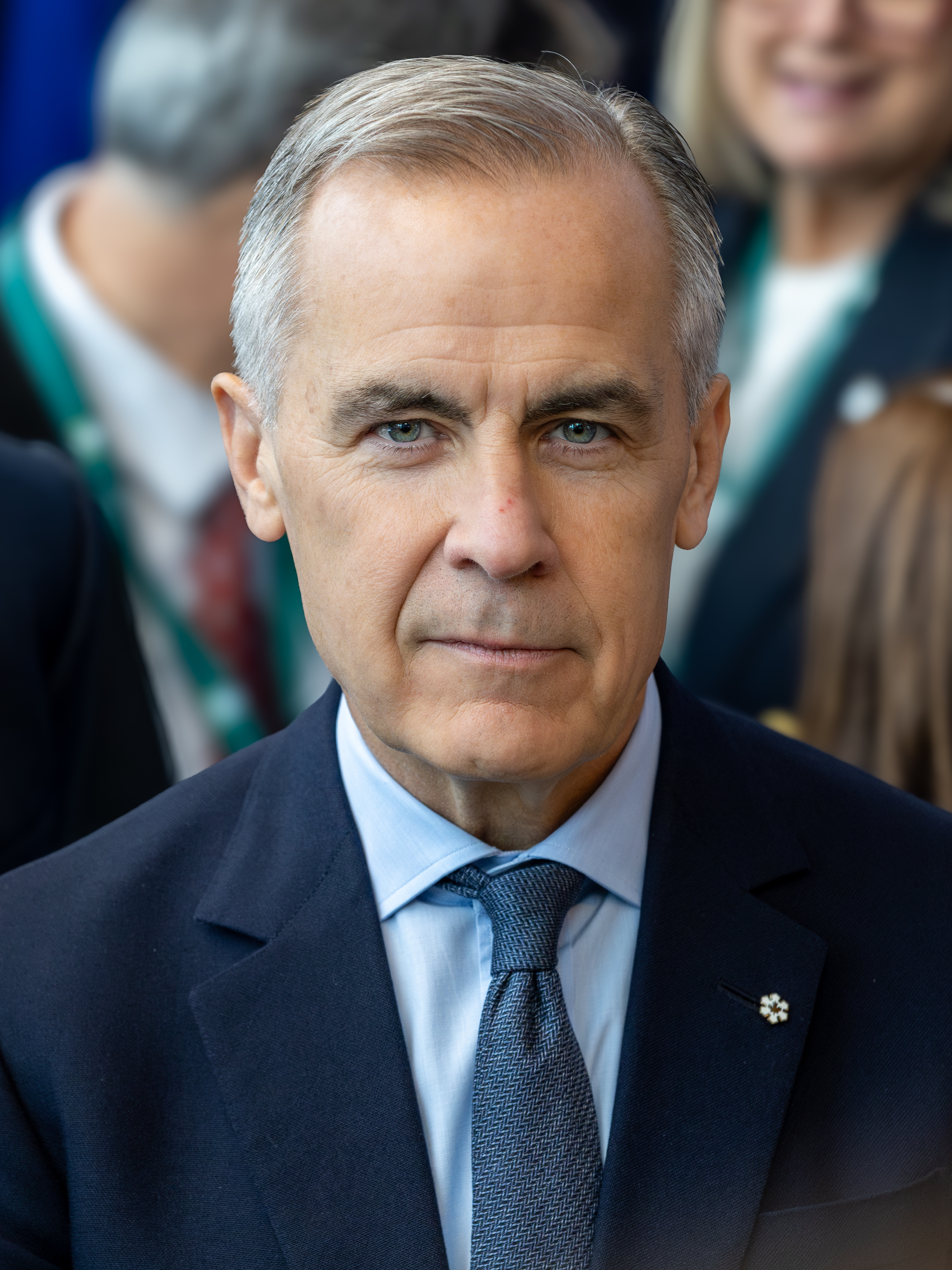

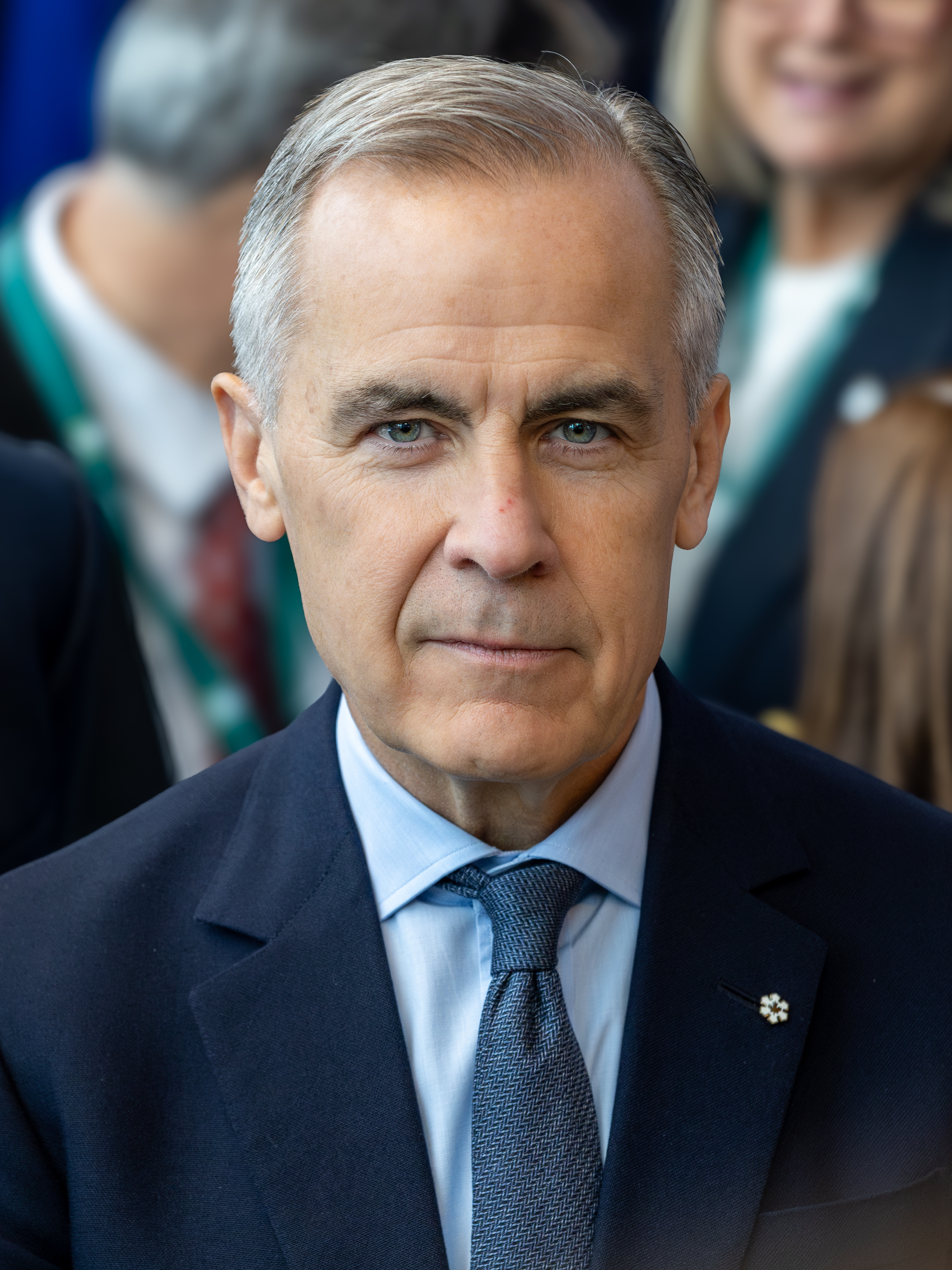
Prime Minister before	Prime Minister after
Mark Carney; Liberal	Mark Carney; Liberal

The 2025 Canadian federal election was held on April 28, 2025 to elect members of the House of Commons to the 45th Canadian Parliament. The Liberal Party of Canada was returned once more with Mark Carney as the new leader and Prime Minister, but shy of a majority of the seats. Significant milestones included the following:

- the Liberals won the popular vote for the first time since 2015
- they earned their highest vote share since 1980, as well as the highest vote share for any party in a federal election since 1984.
- the election saw the highest turnout since 1993, with 69.5% of eligible voters casting a ballot.
- both the Liberal Party and the Conservative Party improved upon their vote share and seat count from 2021, while the other parties all lost ground
- this was the first election since 2000 in which the Liberals, or any party, polled over 40 percent; the first since 1988 in which the Conservatives did so; (Note: At that time, their predecessor party, the Progressive Conservative Party of Canada (then led by Brian Mulroney) was active. Moreover, this remains true even when combining the Progressive Conservative and Reform/Canadian Alliance vote shares from 1993 through 2000.) and the first time since 1930 in which both passed that threshold
- this was the most concentrated the popular vote had been in support of the top two parties since 1958, with over 85% voting Liberal or Conservative

Of the 343 seats being contested, 59 changed hands, going either to the Liberals or Conservatives. The NDP had its worst electoral result ever, and lost its official party status for the first time since 1993. The Greens received their lowest popular vote since 2000, and the People's Party of Canada, receiving almost 5% of the popular vote in 2021, collapsed to 0.7% in the current election.

== Seat change summary ==
Parties had the following gains and losses (as compared to 2021 redistributed results):

Elections to the 45th Parliament of Canada – seats won/lost by party, 2021–2025
Party	2021	Gain from (loss to)										2025
Party	2021	Lib		Con		NDP		BQ		Grn		2025
Liberal	157			11	(17)	7		11				169
Conservative	126	17	(11)			10		1		1		144
New Democratic	24		(7)		(10)							7
Bloc Québécois	34		(11)		(1)							22
Green	2				(1)							1
Total	343	17	(29)	11	(29)	17	–	12	–	1	–	343

== Synopsis of results ==
Results by riding — 2025 Canadian federal election
Riding (Note: Sorted in order of electoral district number)		Winning party								Votes (Note: minor political parties are aggregated under "Other"; independent candidates are aggregated separately)								
Riding		2021 (Redist.)	1st place	Votes	Share	Margin #	Margin %	2nd place	3rd place	Lib	Con	NDP	BQ	PPC	Green	Ind	Other	Total
NL	Avalon	Lib	Lib	27,563	58.61%	10,610	22.56%	Con	NDP	27,563	16,953	2,284	–	–	–	–	230	47,030
NL	Cape Spear	Lib	Lib	31,388	68.25%	19,544	42.50%	Con	NDP	31,388	11,844	2,446	–	–	140	–	170	45,988
NL	Central Newfoundland	Con	Con	21,975	54.08%	4,279	10.53%	Lib	NDP	17,696	21,975	965	–	–	–	–	–	40,636
NL	Labrador	Lib	Lib	5,811	51.50%	1,102	9.77%	Con	NDP	5,811	4,709	764	–	–	–	–	–	11,284
NL	Long Range Mountains	Lib	Con	23,232	50.35%	3,506	7.60%	Lib	NDP	19,726	23,232	2,011	–	537	–	637	–	46,143
NL	St. John's East	Lib	Lib	28,681	62.28%	16,740	36.35%	Con	NDP	28,681	11,941	5,172	–	–	159	–	98	46,051
NL	Terra Nova—The Peninsulas (Note: Results as determined in judicial recount.)	Lib	Con	19,605	47.96%	12	0.03%	Lib	NDP	19,593	19,605	1,677	–	–	–	–	–	40,875
PE	Cardigan	Lib	Lib	14,404	57.02%	4,962	19.64%	Con	NDP	14,404	9,442	505	–	180	326	404	–	25,261
PE	Charlottetown	Lib	Lib	13,656	64.75%	7,517	35.64%	Con	NDP	13,656	6,139	906	–	131	257	–	–	21,089
PE	Egmont	Lib	Lib	12,466	51.92%	2,047	8.53%	Con	NDP	12,466	10,419	585	–	–	538	–	–	24,008
PE	Malpeque	Lib	Lib	15,485	57.60%	5,639	20.98%	Con	Green	15,485	9,846	371	–	132	1,049	–	–	26,883
NS	Acadie—Annapolis	Con	Con	23,024	47.67%	533	1.10%	Lib	NDP	22,491	23,024	1,768	–	432	583	–	–	48,298
NS	Cape Breton—Canso—Antigonish	Lib	Lib	24,908	51.59%	4,038	8.36%	Con	NDP	24,908	20,870	1,930	–	333	–	237	–	48,278
NS	Central Nova	Lib	Lib	26,078	51.93%	4,613	9.19%	Con	NDP	26,078	21,465	1,649	–	331	455	235	–	50,213
NS	Cumberland—Colchester	Con	Lib	23,929	48.31%	1,228	2.48%	Con	NDP	23,929	22,701	1,873	–	333	694	–	–	49,530
NS	Dartmouth—Cole Harbour	Lib	Lib	40,367	67.69%	26,810	44.96%	Con	NDP	40,367	13,557	4,201	–	750	628	–	131	59,634
NS	Halifax	Lib	Lib	32,886	63.05%	22,947	43.99%	Con	NDP	32,886	9,939	8,642	–	271	422	–	–	52,160
NS	Halifax West	Lib	Lib	36,200	65.60%	21,180	38.38%	Con	NDP	36,200	15,020	3,083	–	384	497	–	–	55,184
NS	Kings—Hants	Lib	Lib	35,836	60.56%	16,063	27.14%	Con	NDP	35,836	19,773	2,154	–	591	825	–	–	59,179
NS	Sackville—Bedford—Preston	Lib	Lib	36,062	61.97%	17,202	29.56%	Con	NDP	36,062	18,860	2,324	–	418	526	–	–	58,190
NS	South Shore—St. Margarets	Con	Lib	27,831	54.88%	6,967	13.74%	Con	Green	27,831	20,864	–	–	698	818	500 (Note: Brendan Mosher, nominated as the NDP candidate, withdrew from the race for personal reasons before nominations closed. The independent candidate Hayden Henderson was subsequently endorsed by the NDP.)	–	50,711
NS	Sydney—Glace Bay	Lib	Lib	25,766	54.63%	7,788	16.51%	Con	NDP	25,766	17,978	1,789	–	589	–	601	443	47,166
NB	Acadie—Bathurst	Lib	Lib	32,556	67.48%	20,015	41.48%	Con	NDP	32,556	12,541	2,108	–	1,043	–	–	–	48,248
NB	Beauséjour	Lib	Lib	36,139	60.60%	16,277	27.30%	Con	NDP	36,139	19,862	1,448	–	503	1,291	–	388	59,631
NB	Fredericton—Oromocto	Lib	Lib	30,750	61.29%	14,550	29.00%	Con	Green	30,750	16,200	908	–	208	1,568	–	535 (Note: Dominic Cardy, former PC MLA and Cabinet minister in New Brunswick, and now the leader of the Canadian Future Party, received 345 votes.)	50,169
NB	Fundy Royal	Con	Con	25,411	53.37%	6,308	13.25%	Lib	NDP	19,103	25,411	1,507	–	629	961	–	–	47,611
NB	Madawaska—Restigouche	Lib	Lib	22,720	55.18%	6,400	15.54%	Con	NDP	22,720	16,320	1,251	–	887	–	–	–	41,178
NB	Miramichi—Grand Lake	Con	Con	18,421	48.15%	384	1.00%	Lib	NDP	18,037	18,421	968	–	–	831	–	–	38,257
NB	Moncton—Dieppe	Lib	Lib	30,215	63.00%	15,241	31.78%	Con	NDP	30,215	14,974	1,775	–	–	994	–	–	47,958
NB	Saint John—Kennebecasis	Lib	Lib	26,129	58.11%	9,342	20.78%	Con	NDP	26,129	16,787	1,206	–	–	737	–	108	44,967
NB	Saint John—St. Croix	Con	Con	26,591	53.08%	5,807	11.59%	Lib	NDP	20,784	26,591	1,643	–	–	794	–	280	50,092
NB	Tobique—Mactaquac	Con	Con	23,322	58.79%	9,096	22.93%	Lib	NDP	14,226	23,322	812	–	501	806	–	–	39,667
QC	Abitibi—Baie-James—Nunavik—Eeyou	BQ	Lib	12,578	41.16%	2,197	7.19%	BQ	Con	12,578	6,850	752	10,381	–	–	–	–	30,561
QC	Abitibi—Témiscamingue	BQ	BQ	24,774	49.43%	11,223	22.39%	Lib	Con	13,551	9,861	1,480	24,774	–	–	–	449	50,115
QC	Ahuntsic-Cartierville	Lib	Lib	30,833	60.96%	22,295	44.08%	BQ	Con	30,833	7,600	3,333	8,538	–	–	–	273	50,577
QC	Alfred-Pellan	Lib	Lib	32,934	54.59%	20,263	33.59%	Con	BQ	32,934	12,671	2,044	12,259	423	–	–	–	60,331
QC	Argenteuil—La Petite-Nation	Lib	Lib	28,124	47.48%	13,427	22.67%	Con	BQ	28,124	14,697	1,499	13,520	586	807	–	–	59,233
QC	Beauce	Con	Con	37,604	59.71%	25,547	40.56%	Lib	BQ	12,057	37,604	1,100	8,595	3,626	–	–	–	62,982
QC	Beauharnois—Salaberry—Soulanges—Huntingdon	BQ	BQ	30,005	43.92%	8,066	11.81%	Lib	Con	21,939	13,230	1,663	30,005	675	802	–	–	68,314
QC	Beauport—Limoilou	BQ	Lib	21,858	35.59%	3,366	5.48%	Con	BQ	21,858	18,492	2,095	17,558	396	924	–	95	61,418
QC	Bécancour—Nicolet—Saurel—Alnôbak	BQ	BQ	25,506	46.96%	10,693	19.69%	Lib	Con	14,813	11,717	1,112	25,506	432	738	–	–	54,318
QC	Bellechasse—Les Etchemins—Lévis	Con	Con	32,097	49.08%	13,455	20.57%	Lib	BQ	18,642	32,097	1,621	12,244	794	–	–	–	65,398
QC	Beloeil—Chambly	BQ	BQ	32,844	48.26%	9,708	14.27%	Lib	Con	23,136	9,199	2,391	32,844	482	–	–	–	68,052
QC	Berthier—Maskinongé	BQ	BQ	21,676	34.99%	6,620	10.69%	Lib	NDP	15,056	10,641	13,457	21,676	575	551	–	–	61,956
QC	Bourassa	Lib	Lib	21,198	58.55%	14,992	41.41%	BQ	Con	21,198	5,905	2,137	6,206	433	–	183	140	36,202
QC	Brome—Missisquoi	Lib	Lib	34,727	48.26%	14,545	20.21%	BQ	Con	34,727	13,743	1,600	20,182	561	1,139	–	–	71,952
QC	Brossard—Saint-Lambert	Lib	Lib	36,541	62.21%	25,465	43.35%	Con	BQ	36,541	11,076	2,049	7,837	381	855	–	–	58,739
QC	Charlesbourg—Haute-Saint-Charles	Con	Con	27,698	42.44%	5,101	7.82%	Lib	BQ	22,597	27,698	1,752	12,346	516	–	357	–	65,266
QC	Châteauguay—Les Jardins-de-Napierville	BQ	Lib	28,224	45.16%	10,064	16.10%	BQ	Con	28,224	13,538	1,377	18,160	429	773	–	–	62,501
QC	Chicoutimi—Le Fjord	Con	Con	17,356	34.14%	1,499	2.95%	BQ	Lib	15,820	17,356	991	15,857	339	476	–	–	50,839
QC	Compton—Stanstead	Lib	Lib	29,951	45.64%	12,646	19.27%	BQ	Con	29,951	14,292	2,124	17,305	787	1,161	–	–	65,620
QC	Côte-du-Sud—Rivière-du-Loup—Kataskomiq—Témiscouata	Con	Con	28,873	45.84%	9,776	15.52%	Lib	BQ	19,097	28,873	1,072	12,598	464	682	–	206	62,992
QC	Côte-Nord—Kawawachikamach—Nitassinan	BQ	BQ	16,243	43.68%	6,058	16.29%	Lib	Con	10,185	9,365	640	16,243	–	–	193	557	37,183
QC	Dorval—Lachine—LaSalle	Lib	Lib	29,927	59.36%	19,499	38.67%	Con	BQ	29,927	10,428	2,104	6,338	478	823	71	251	50,420
QC	Drummond	BQ	BQ	24,071	42.80%	8,073	14.35%	Lib	Con	15,998	12,790	2,607	24,071	773	–	–	–	56,239
QC	Gaspésie—Les Îles-de-la-Madeleine—Listuguj	BQ	BQ	26,091	45.79%	4,274	7.50%	Lib	Con	21,817	7,047	1,005	26,091	452	–	–	572	56,984
QC	Gatineau	Lib	Lib	34,751	60.54%	23,769	41.41%	Con	BQ	34,751	10,982	1,615	9,373	505	–	–	173	57,399
QC	Hochelaga—Rosemont-Est	Lib	Lib	23,601	46.14%	9,699	18.96%	BQ	NDP	23,601	5,402	6,671	13,902	–	1,329	–	242	51,147
QC	Honoré-Mercier	Lib	Lib	29,947	60.16%	19,255	38.68%	Con	BQ	29,947	10,692	1,787	6,435	351	568	–	–	49,780
QC	Hull—Aylmer	Lib	Lib	31,978	62.11%	23,251	45.16%	Con	BQ	31,978	8,727	2,855	6,248	341	1,130	–	208	51,487
QC	Joliette—Manawan	BQ	BQ	28,196	49.27%	10,306	18.01%	Lib	Con	17,890	8,721	1,408	28,196	–	1,014	–	–	57,229
QC	Jonquière	BQ	BQ	20,247	39.99%	4,933	9.74%	Con	Lib	13,172	15,314	932	20,247	516	448	–	–	50,629
QC	La Pointe-de-l'Île	BQ	BQ	22,940	43.11%	2,889	5.43%	Lib	Con	20,051	6,781	2,279	22,940	–	977	–	181	53,209
QC	La Prairie—Atateken	BQ	Lib	29,418	44.06%	6,186	9.27%	BQ	Con	29,418	11,505	1,588	23,232	361	657	–	–	66,761
QC	Lac-Saint-Jean	BQ	BQ	22,069	46.21%	9,533	19.96%	Lib	Con	12,536	11,792	819	22,069	540	–	–	–	47,756
QC	Lac-Saint-Louis	Lib	Lib	43,446	67.63%	28,243	43.96%	Con	BQ	43,446	15,203	1,877	2,330	471	915	–	–	64,242
QC	LaSalle—Émard—Verdun	Lib	Lib	27,439	50.86%	15,972	29.60%	BQ	Con	27,439	7,456	5,587	11,467	260	1,298	–	446	53,953
QC	Laurentides—Labelle	BQ	BQ	23,615	44.57%	5,101	9.63%	Lib	Con	18,514	7,900	1,341	23,615	749	864	–	–	52,983
QC	Laurier—Sainte-Marie	Lib	Lib	27,286	52.07%	17,430	33.26%	NDP	BQ	27,286	4,796	9,856	8,079	253	1,452	100	579	52,401
QC	Laval—Les Îles	Lib	Lib	28,302	49.73%	9,947	17.48%	Con	BQ	28,302	18,355	1,961	8,298	–	–	–	–	56,916
QC	Les Pays-d'en-Haut	BQ	Lib	26,967	41.04%	3,217	4.90%	BQ	Con	26,967	11,816	1,493	23,750	639	1,038	–	–	65,703
QC	Lévis—Lotbinière	Con	Con	33,312	47.71%	12,763	18.28%	Lib	BQ	20,549	33,312	1,635	13,627	698	–	–	–	69,821
QC	Longueuil—Charles-LeMoyne	Lib	Lib	25,138	49.39%	11,555	22.70%	BQ	Con	25,138	8,547	2,832	13,583	411	–	–	389	50,900
QC	Longueuil—Saint-Hubert	BQ	Lib	24,237	40.98%	769	1.30%	BQ	Con	24,237	8,447	2,986	23,468	–	–	–	–	59,138
QC	Louis-Hébert	Lib	Lib	33,512	55.44%	20,615	34.11%	BQ	Con	33,512	12,164	1,540	12,897	332	–	–	–	60,445
QC	Louis-Saint-Laurent—Akiawenhrahk	Con	Con	29,525	44.86%	7,832	11.90%	Lib	BQ	21,693	29,525	1,607	12,465	527	–	–	–	65,817
QC	Marc-Aurèle-Fortin	Lib	Lib	29,928	51.99%	16,344	28.39%	BQ	Con	29,928 (Note: Carlos Leitão was Quebec's Minister of Finance under Philippe Couillard.)	11,923	2,128	13,584	–	–	–	–	57,563
QC	Mégantic—L'Érable—Lotbinière	Con	Con	34,470	58.79%	21,876	37.31%	Lib	BQ	12,594	34,470	1,066	9,607	717	–	–	181	58,635
QC	Mirabel	BQ	BQ	22,494	39.91%	3,698	6.56%	Lib	Con	18,796	12,544	1,333	22,494	400	792	–	–	56,359
QC	Mount Royal	Lib	Lib	25,544	51.06%	5,300	10.59%	Con	NDP	25,544	20,244	2,353	1,671	–	–	–	216	50,028
QC	Mont-Saint-Bruno—L'Acadie	BQ	Lib	32,149	47.10%	8,202	12.02%	BQ	Con	32,149	9,335	1,590	23,947	397	833	–	–	68,251
QC	Montcalm	BQ	BQ	27,268	46.60%	11,499	19.65%	Lib	Con	15,769	13,589	1,893	27,268	–	–	–	–	58,519
QC	Montmorency—Charlevoix	BQ	Con	20,494	34.50%	524	0.88%	BQ	Lib	17,101	20,494	905	19,970	357	580	–	–	59,407
QC	Notre-Dame-de-Grâce—Westmount	Lib	Lib	34,226	63.99%	23,709	44.32%	Con	NDP	34,226	10,517	3,956	2,652	256	1,331	264	288	53,490
QC	Outremont	Lib	Lib	26,024	55.20%	20,113	42.66%	Con	BQ	26,024	5,911	5,024	5,644	–	4,539	–	–	47,142
QC	Papineau	Lib	Lib	24,700	52.98%	16,974	36.41%	BQ	NDP	24,700	4,927	7,606	7,726	455	–	–	1,205	46,619
QC	Pierre-Boucher—Les Patriotes—Verchères	BQ	BQ	28,765	46.08%	4,548	7.29%	Lib	Con	24,217	7,375	1,541	28,765	528	–	–	–	62,426
QC	Pierrefonds—Dollard	Lib	Lib	34,326	60.08%	16,873	29.53%	Con	BQ	34,326	17,453	1,613	3,097	333	–	314	–	57,136
QC	Pontiac—Kitigan Zibi	Lib	Lib	32,088	54.60%	15,867	27.00%	Con	BQ	32,088	16,221	2,971	6,071	673	749	–	–	58,773
QC	Portneuf—Jacques-Cartier	Con	Con	32,184	49.56%	13,319	20.51%	Lib	BQ	18,865	32,184	1,034	11,606	524	728	–	–	64,941
QC	Québec Centre	Lib	Lib	27,880	49.50%	7,677	13.63%	BQ	NDP	27,880	–	4,400	20,203	2,818	–	1,018 (Note: Patrick Kerr had previously stood as a Green candidate in the past three federal elections.)	–	56,319
QC	Repentigny	BQ	BQ	26,593	42.20%	2,174	3.45%	Lib	Con	24,419	9,583	1,722	26,593	384	–	314	–	63,015
QC	Richmond—Arthabaska	Con	Con	22,206	35.50%	1,577	2.52%	Lib	BQ	20,629	22,206	1,248	17,095	707	–	223	438	62,546
QC	Rimouski—La Matapédia	BQ	BQ	24,947	46.16%	5,746	10.63%	Lib	Con	19,201	7,324	974	24,947	338	–	961	295	54,040
QC	Rivière-des-Mille-Îles	BQ	Lib	27,326	45.63%	7,657	12.79%	BQ	Con	27,326	10,398	1,270	19,669	306	734	184	–	59,887
QC	Rivière-du-Nord	BQ	BQ	25,438	43.85%	7,093	12.23%	Lib	Con	18,345	12,203	2,032	25,438	–	–	–	–	58,018
QC	Rosemont—La Petite-Patrie	NDP	NDP	24,358	40.99%	5,601	9.43%	Lib	BQ	18,757	4,073	24,358	10,864	–	1,368	–	–	59,420
QC	Saint-Hyacinthe—Bagot—Acton	BQ	BQ	25,447	43.88%	5,943	10.25%	Lib	Con	19,504	10,431	1,373	25,447	431	800	–	–	57,986
QC	Saint-Jean	BQ	BQ	28,474	44.34%	6,475	10.08%	Lib	Con	21,999	10,480	1,650	28,474	624	988	–	–	64,215
QC	Saint-Laurent	Lib	Lib	26,021	58.89%	13,544	30.65%	Con	BQ	26,021	12,477	1,985	2,523	349	693	–	137	44,185
QC	Saint-Léonard—Saint-Michel	Lib	Lib	26,833	65.34%	18,376	44.75%	Con	BQ	26,833	8,457	2,450	2,938	388	–	–	–	41,066
QC	Saint-Maurice—Champlain	Lib	Lib	31,095	49.96%	15,774	25.34%	Con	BQ	31,095	15,321	1,224	13,190	455	704	–	251	62,240
QC	Shefford	BQ	BQ	26,726	40.11%	571	0.86%	Lib	Con	26,155	11,404	1,557	26,726	789	–	–	–	66,631
QC	Sherbrooke	Lib	Lib	31,249	51.29%	15,025	24.66%	BQ	Con	31,249	7,983	3,516	16,224	576	1,383	–	–	60,931
QC	Terrebonne	BQ	Lib	23,352	38.74%	1	–	BQ	Con	23,352	10,961	1,556	23,351	428	630	–	–	60,278
QC	Thérèse-De Blainville	BQ	Lib	29,519	45.84%	8,691	13.50%	BQ	Con	29,519	12,019	1,585	20,828	446	–	–	–	64,397
QC	Trois-Rivières	BQ	Lib	25,147	41.01%	8,226	13.42%	BQ	Con	25,147	16,708	1,437	16,921	320	569	–	215	61,317
QC	Vaudreuil	Lib	Lib	40,982	57.87%	24,803	35.02%	Con	BQ	40,982	16,179	1,602	10,571	527	957	–	–	70,818
QC	Ville-Marie—Le Sud-Ouest—Île-des-Sœurs	Lib	Lib	30,905	63.70%	21,792	44.91%	Con	BQ	30,905	9,113	2,932	4,364	–	996	–	209	48,519
QC	Vimy	Lib	Lib	26,531	53.41%	14,253	28.69%	Con	BQ	26,531	12,278	2,342	8,526	–	–	–	–	49,677
ON	Ajax	Lib	Lib	36,975	56.32%	11,317	17.24%	Con	NDP	36,975	25,658	1,762	–	–	612	–	643	65,650
ON	Algonquin—Renfrew—Pembroke	Con	Con	37,333	55.71%	11,995	17.90%	Lib	NDP	25,338	37,333	2,469	–	–	618	351	909	67,018
ON	Aurora—Oak Ridges—Richmond Hill	Lib	Con	34,023	54.73%	7,433	11.96%	Lib	NDP	26,590	34,023	835	–	256	465	–	–	62,169
ON	Barrie South—Innisfil	Con	Con	38,943	57.84%	13,386	19.88%	Lib	NDP	25,557	38,943	2,130	–	695	–	–	–	67,325
ON	Barrie—Springwater—Oro-Medonte	Con	Con	33,949	51.67%	4,799	7.30%	Lib	NDP	29,150	33,949	1,559	–	–	893	–	158	65,709
ON	Bay of Quinte	Con	Lib	32,846	50.39%	3,716	5.70%	Con	NDP	32,846	29,130	2,373	–	–	833	–	–	65,182
ON	Beaches—East York	Lib	Lib	39,804	67.75%	25,974	44.21%	Con	NDP	39,804	13,830	4,027	–	–	748	161	185	58,755
ON	Bowmanville—Oshawa North	Con	Con	35,232	49.77%	3,018	4.26%	Lib	NDP	32,214	35,232	2,032	–	–	546	264	500	70,788
ON	Brampton Centre	Lib	Lib	19,716	48.37%	611	1.50%	Con	NDP	19,716	19,105	1,085	–	288	469	–	97	40,760
ON	Brampton—Chinguacousy Park	Lib	Lib	21,532	48.85%	1,941	4.40%	Con	NDP	21,532	19,591	1,173	–	741	521	328	194	44,080
ON	Brampton East	Lib	Lib	23,616	48.59%	1,885	3.88%	Con	PPC	23,616	21,731	821	–	2,305	–	–	132	48,605
ON	Brampton North—Caledon	Lib	Lib	22,847	49.03%	742	1.59%	Con	NDP	22,847	22,105	1,008	–	635	–	–	–	46,595
ON	Brampton South	Lib	Lib	22,001	49.33%	808	1.81%	Con	NDP	22,001	21,193	777	–	358	–	274	–	44,603
ON	Brampton West	Lib	Con	21,112	49.81%	918	2.17%	Lib	NDP	20,194	21,112	708	–	–	278	–	95	42,387
ON	Brantford—Brant South—Six Nations	Con	Con	34,501	52.44%	7,469	11.35%	Lib	NDP	27,032	34,501	2,410	–	392	1,110	348	–	65,793
ON	Bruce—Grey—Owen Sound	Con	Con	35,484	53.03%	8,647	12.92%	Lib	NDP	26,837	35,484	2,069	–	520	1,447	–	554	66,911
ON	Burlington	Lib	Lib	43,593	55.80%	11,907	15.24%	Con	NDP	43,593	31,686	1,549	–	523	595	–	180	78,126
ON	Burlington North—Milton West	Lib	Lib	37,155	52.75%	5,983	8.49%	Con	NDP	37,155	31,172	1,507	–	607	–	–	–	70,441
ON	Cambridge	Lib	Con	31,766	48.56%	1,457	2.23%	Lib	NDP	30,309	31,766	2,183	–	–	1,052	–	109	65,419
ON	Carleton	Con	Lib	43,846	50.95%	4,513	5.24%	Con	NDP	43,846	39,333	1,221	–	–	561	856 (Note: The Longest Ballot Committee had arranged for the nomination of 83 candidates as either independent or of no affiliation.)	243	86,060
ON	Chatham-Kent—Leamington	Con	Con	41,612	57.51%	15,634	21.61%	Lib	NDP	25,978	41,612	2,943	–	1,061	757	–	–	72,351
ON	Davenport	Lib	Lib	35,364	57.81%	21,175	34.61%	Con	NDP	35,364	14,189	10,452	–	–	782	–	387	61,174
ON	Don Valley North	Lib	Lib	25,822	53.21%	5,276	10.87%	Con	NDP	25,822	20,546	1,191	–	260	448	260	–	48,527
ON	Don Valley West	Lib	Lib	36,744	62.63%	17,264	29.43%	Con	NDP	36,744	19,480	1,382	–	–	616	442	–	58,664
ON	Dufferin—Caledon	Con	Con	42,458	60.14%	17,640	24.99%	Lib	NDP	24,818	42,458	1,380	–	752	927	260	–	70,595
ON	Eglinton—Lawrence	Lib	Lib	29,949	49.29%	888	1.46%	Con	NDP	29,949	29,061	996	–	326	429	–	–	60,761
ON	Elgin—St. Thomas—London South	Con	Con	32,565	50.14%	4,555	7.01%	Lib	NDP	28,010	32,565	3,118	–	1,256	–	–	–	64,949
ON	Essex	Con	Con	46,123	57.52%	16,734	20.87%	Lib	NDP	29,389	46,123	3,826	–	843	–	–	–	80,181
ON	Etobicoke Centre	Lib	Lib	36,186	53.60%	6,473	9.59%	Con	NDP	36,186	29,713	1,611	–	–	–	–	–	67,510
ON	Etobicoke—Lakeshore	Lib	Lib	37,512	57.41%	12,164	18.62%	Con	NDP	37,512	25,348	1,665	–	616	–	–	197	65,338
ON	Etobicoke North	Lib	Lib	22,270	52.58%	4,911	11.59%	Con	NDP	22,270	17,359	1,354	–	846	394	132	–	42,355
ON	Flamborough—Glanbrook—Brant North	Con	Con	35,246	52.70%	6,331	9.47%	Lib	NDP	28,915	35,246	1,630	–	499	594	–	–	66,884
ON	Guelph	Lib	Lib	36,406	54.67%	15,936	23.93%	Con	Green	36,406	20,470	2,129	–	498	6,779	117	194	66,593
ON	Haldimand—Norfolk	Con	Con	41,218	57.56%	15,178	21.20%	Lib	NDP	26,040	41,218	2,412	–	657	750	–	529	71,606
ON	Haliburton—Kawartha Lakes	Con	Con	42,701	56.56%	13,478	17.85%	Lib	NDP	29,223	42,701	2,625	–	954	–	–	–	75,503
ON	Hamilton Centre	NDP	Lib	21,388	37.55%	4,309	7.57%	Con	NDP	21,388	17,079	16,581	–	591	818	305	190	56,952
ON	Hamilton East—Stoney Creek	Lib	Con	32,857	48.70%	1,479	2.19%	Lib	NDP	31,378	32,857	2,471	–	762	–	–	–	67,468
ON	Hamilton Mountain	Lib	Lib	27,302	45.58%	2,445	4.08%	Con	NDP	27,302	24,857	7,044	–	497	–	–	193	59,893
ON	Hamilton West—Ancaster—Dundas	Lib	Lib	38,970	56.10%	13,423	19.32%	Con	NDP	38,970	25,547	3,648	–	307	829	–	163	69,464
ON	Hastings—Lennox and Addington—Tyendinaga	Con	Con	36,005	54.32%	9,260	13.97%	Lib	NDP	26,745	36,005	2,351	–	377	803	–	–	66,281
ON	Humber River—Black Creek	Lib	Lib	21,357	55.62%	7,612	19.82%	Con	NDP	21,357	13,745	2,449	–	621	–	–	226	38,398
ON	Huron—Bruce	Con	Con	37,027	53.16%	8,091	11.62%	Lib	NDP	28,936	37,027	2,300	–	–	927	467	–	69,657
ON	Kanata	Lib	Lib	45,244	60.76%	18,687	25.10%	Con	NDP	45,244	26,557	1,702	–	–	835	–	122	74,460
ON	Kapuskasing—Timmins—Mushkegowuk	NDP	Con	23,062	48.93%	4,696	9.96%	Lib	NDP	18,366	23,062	4,895	–	814	–	–	–	47,137
ON	Kenora—Kiiwetinoong	Con	Con	13,109	48.75%	3,655	13.59%	Lib	NDP	9,454	13,109	3,698	–	204	286	141	–	26,892
ON	Kingston and the Islands	Lib	Lib	48,682	63.23%	25,090	32.59%	Con	NDP	48,682	23,592	3,648	–	–	1,071	–	–	76,993
ON	King—Vaughan	Con	Con	41,682	61.53%	17,330	25.58%	Lib	NDP	24,352	41,682	769	–	368	576	–	–	67,747
ON	Kitchener Centre	Green	Con	20,234	34.25%	375	0.63%	Green	Lib	17,292	20,234	1,157	–	334	19,859	–	208	59,084
ON	Kitchener—Conestoga	Lib	Lib	30,001	48.32%	522	0.84%	Con	NDP	30,001	29,479	1,821	–	786	–	–	–	62,087
ON	Kitchener South—Hespeler	Lib	Con	28,973	47.94%	1,028	1.70%	Lib	NDP	27,945	28,973	1,823	–	386	1,208	–	96	60,431
ON	Lanark—Frontenac	Con	Con	34,186	50.41%	3,286	4.85%	Lib	NDP	30,900	34,186	1,986	–	–	741	–	–	67,813
ON	Leeds—Grenville—Thousand Islands—Rideau Lakes	Con	Con	33,437	50.05%	3,781	5.66%	Lib	NDP	29,656	33,437	2,341	–	596	781	–	–	66,811
ON	London Centre	Lib	Lib	33,999	56.74%	15,366	25.64%	Con	NDP	33,999	18,633	5,790	–	523	878	–	100	59,923
ON	London—Fanshawe	NDP	Con	23,749	40.58%	5,886	10.06%	Lib	NDP	17,863	23,749	16,135	–	776	–	–	–	58,523
ON	London West	Lib	Lib	35,309	56.22%	12,070	19.22%	Con	NDP	35,309	23,239	3,463	–	–	427	–	370	62,808
ON	Markham—Stouffville	Lib	Lib	31,658	51.36%	3,760	6.10%	Con	NDP	31,658	27,898	1,121	–	393	433	–	141	61,644
ON	Markham—Thornhill	Lib	Lib	27,504	54.54%	6,501	12.89%	Con	NDP	27,504	21,003	1,022	–	747	–	–	153	50,429
ON	Markham—Unionville	Lib	Con	27,055	50.65%	1,922	3.60%	Lib	NDP	25,133	27,055	723	–	–	503	–	–	53,414
ON	Middlesex—London	Con	Con	36,093	51.67%	6,693	9.58%	Lib	NDP	29,400	36,093	2,888	–	577	698	–	191	69,847
ON	Milton East—Halton Hills South	Lib	Lib	32,178	48.25%	21	0.03%	Con	NDP	32,178	32,157 (Note: Parm Gill left the House in 2018 to become MPP for Milton. He resigned from that position in 2024 in order to seek a return to Ottawa.)	1,029	–	475	672	174	–	66,685
ON	Mississauga Centre	Lib	Lib	29,605	53.85%	6,595	12.00%	Con	NDP	29,605	23,010	1,502	–	602	–	257	–	54,976
ON	Mississauga East—Cooksville	Lib	Lib	27,138	50.20%	3,026	5.60%	Con	NDP	27,138	24,112	1,508	–	964	–	221	113	54,056
ON	Mississauga—Erin Mills	Lib	Lib	33,448	55.71%	9,448	15.74%	Con	NDP	33,448	24,000	1,311	–	734	367	179	–	60,039
ON	Mississauga—Lakeshore	Lib	Lib	34,971	52.35%	5,555	8.32%	Con	NDP	34,971	29,416	1,254	–	334	587	122	113	66,797
ON	Mississauga—Malton	Lib	Lib	26,793	53.30%	5,591	11.12%	Con	NDP	26,793	21,202	1,290	–	983	–	–	–	50,268
ON	Mississauga—Streetsville	Lib	Lib	31,297	51.53%	4,056	6.68%	Con	NDP	31,297	27,241	1,388	–	366	439	–	–	60,731
ON	Nepean	Lib	Lib	46,073	63.78%	22,056	30.53%	Con	NDP	46,073 (Note: Chandra Arya's nomination was revoked in order to allow Mark Carney to stand for a seat in the House.)	24,017	1,424	–	261	462	–	–	72,237
ON	Newmarket—Aurora	Lib	Con	31,540	50.62%	2,241	3.60%	Lib	NDP	29,299	31,540	1,473	–	–	–	–	–	62,312
ON	New Tecumseth—Gwillimbury	Con	Con	39,247	59.35%	14,803	22.39%	Lib	NDP	24,444	39,247	1,226	–	496	712	–	–	66,125
ON	Niagara Falls—Niagara-on-the-Lake	Con	Con	29,774	49.14%	2,575	4.25%	Lib	NDP	27,199	29,774	2,335	–	481	518	–	288	60,595
ON	Niagara South	Con	Con	36,702	47.81%	2,994	3.90%	Lib	NDP	33,708 (Note: Vance Badawey was the Liberal incumbent elected in 2021, but transposition of votes through redistribution gave the riding a Conservative plurality.)	36,702	4,307	–	1,147	683	–	216	76,763
ON	Niagara West	Con	Con	36,418	51.72%	5,994	8.51%	Lib	NDP	30,424	36,418	2,262	–	582	–	–	727	70,413
ON	Nipissing—Timiskaming	Lib	Lib	27,674	47.24%	1,553	2.65%	Con	NDP	27,674	26,121	3,548	–	648	585	–	–	58,576
ON	Northumberland—Clarke	Con	Con	34,862	48.97%	2,214	3.11%	Lib	NDP	32,648	34,862	2,090	–	521	630	270	171	71,192
ON	Oakville East	Lib	Lib	31,128	51.14%	3,827	6.29%	Con	NDP	31,128	27,301	1,698	–	335	351	–	59	60,872
ON	Oakville West	Lib	Lib	31,872	53.08%	5,204	8.67%	Con	NDP	31,872	26,668	831	–	254	363	55	–	60,043
ON	Orléans	Lib	Lib	53,146	67.44%	31,074	39.43%	Con	NDP	53,146	22,072	2,063	–	331	652	238	301	78,803
ON	Oshawa	Con	Con	32,131	48.17%	3,478	5.21%	Lib	NDP	28,653	32,131	5,112	–	–	804	–	–	66,700
ON	Ottawa Centre	Lib	Lib	51,026	62.73%	35,091	43.14%	NDP	Con	51,026	12,692	15,935	–	–	916	113	656	81,338
ON	Ottawa South	Lib	Lib	43,388	65.18%	25,378	38.13%	Con	NDP	43,388	18,010	4,017	–	–	642	–	507	66,564
ON	Ottawa—Vanier—Gloucester	Lib	Lib	45,934	67.37%	31,301	45.91%	Con	NDP	45,934	14,633	5,164	–	349	1,345	238	520	68,183
ON	Ottawa West—Nepean	Lib	Lib	43,555	63.64%	25,038	36.58%	Con	NDP	43,555	18,517	4,847	–	514	780	–	232	68,445
ON	Oxford	Con	Con	38,191	53.38%	10,880	15.21%	Lib	NDP	27,311	38,191	3,046	–	642	897	109	1,355	71,551
ON	Parry Sound—Muskoka	Con	Con	33,742	52.19%	6,179	9.56%	Lib	NDP	27,563	33,742	2,300	–	1,048	–	–	–	64,653
ON	Perth—Wellington	Con	Con	33,972	53.01%	7,830	12.22%	Lib	NDP	26,142	33,972	2,909	–	1,069	–	–	–	64,092
ON	Peterborough	Con	Lib	42,890	54.25%	10,444	13.21%	Con	NDP	42,890	32,446	2,406	–	272	655	222	168	79,059
ON	Pickering—Brooklin	Lib	Lib	38,578	54.16%	9,258	13.00%	Con	NDP	38,578	29,320	1,838	–	639	535	–	322	71,232
ON	Prescott—Russell—Cumberland	Lib	Lib	39,110	54.78%	10,305	14.43%	Con	NDP	39,110	28,805	1,730	–	725	787	236	–	71,393
ON	Richmond Hill South	Lib	Con	30,615	52.26%	4,606	7.86%	Lib	NDP	26,009	30,615	1,054	–	244	495	124	43	58,584
ON	Sarnia—Lambton—Bkejwanong	Con	Con	40,597	53.15%	11,657	15.26%	Lib	NDP	28,940	40,597	4,088	–	1,136	–	–	1,628	76,389
ON	Sault Ste. Marie—Algoma	Con	Lib	30,936	47.36%	1,728	2.65%	Con	NDP	30,936	29,208	4,327	–	–	541	–	305	65,317
ON	Scarborough—Agincourt	Lib	Lib	27,552	54.31%	5,820	11.47%	Con	NDP	27,552	21,732	1,449	–	–	–	–	–	50,733
ON	Scarborough Centre—Don Valley East	Lib	Lib	27,557	57.31%	9,250	19.24%	Con	NDP	27,557	18,307	1,565	–	659	–	–	–	48,088
ON	Scarborough—Guildwood—Rouge Park	Lib	Lib	35,295	63.96%	17,810	32.27%	Con	NDP	35,295	17,485	1,772	–	–	633	–	–	55,185
ON	Scarborough North	Lib	Lib	29,418	62.95%	13,931	29.81%	Con	NDP	29,418	15,487	1,827	–	–	–	–	–	46,732
ON	Scarborough Southwest	Lib	Lib	33,495	61.49%	16,843	30.92%	Con	NDP	33,495	16,652	2,730	–	567	754	–	278	54,476
ON	Scarborough—Woburn	Lib	Lib	25,281	60.38%	10,990	26.25%	Con	NDP	25,281	14,291	1,466	–	–	499	181	150	41,868
ON	Simcoe—Grey	Con	Con	35,364	52.08%	5,909	8.70%	Lib	NDP	29,455	35,364	1,574	–	523	991	–	–	67,907
ON	Simcoe North	Con	Con	32,241	48.41%	2,474	3.71%	Lib	NDP	29,767	32,241	2,508	–	638	1,260	–	191	66,605
ON	Spadina—Harbourfront	Lib	Lib	31,832	60.07%	15,546	29.34%	Con	NDP	31,832	16,286	4,107	–	193	448	39	85	52,990
ON	St. Catharines	Lib	Lib	34,750	52.01%	7,737	11.58%	Con	NDP	34,750	27,013	4,021	–	522	–	306	198	66,810
ON	Stormont—Dundas—Glengarry	Con	Con	37,399	56.32%	10,992	16.55%	Lib	NDP	26,407	37,399	1,653	–	–	674	–	274	66,407
ON	Sudbury	Lib	Lib	31,551	51.86%	7,716	12.68%	Con	NDP	31,551	23,835	4,680	–	773	–	–	–	60,839
ON	Sudbury East—Manitoulin—Nickel Belt	Lib	Con	29,156	48.33%	4,081	6.77%	Lib	NDP	25,075	29,156	4,822	–	489	465	–	316	60,323
ON	Taiaiko'n—Parkdale—High Park	Lib	Lib	36,439	55.79%	21,436	32.82%	NDP	Con	36,439	12,662	15,003	–	–	700	–	509	65,313
ON	Thornhill	Con	Con	44,419	66.38%	23,546	35.19%	Lib	NDP	20,873	44,419	833	–	440	353	–	–	66,918
ON	Thunder Bay—Rainy River	Lib	Lib	21,125	48.53%	2,440	5.61%	Con	NDP	21,125	18,685	2,954	–	433	334	–	–	43,531
ON	Thunder Bay—Superior North	Lib	Lib	25,134	55.22%	8,867	19.48%	Con	NDP	25,134	16,267	3,235	–	459	417	–	–	45,512
ON	Toronto Centre	Lib	Lib	37,907	64.33%	25,586	43.42%	Con	NDP	37,907	12,321	7,358	–	235	664	90	347	58,922
ON	Toronto—Danforth	Lib	Lib	39,191	66.56%	28,004	47.56%	Con	NDP	39,191	11,187	7,626	–	–	626	–	251	58,881
ON	Toronto—St. Paul's	Lib	Lib	44,313	61.91%	20,613	28.80%	Con	NDP	44,313	23,700	2,496	–	329	552	–	191	71,581
ON	University—Rosedale	Lib	Lib	39,847	64.00%	25,223	40.51%	Con	NDP	39,847	14,624	6,168	–	–	1,066	118	442	62,265
ON	Vaughan—Woodbridge	Lib	Con	40,422	60.01%	14,805	21.98%	Lib	NDP	25,617	40,422	891	–	425	–	–	–	67,355
ON	Waterloo	Lib	Lib	37,579	59.47%	17,008	26.91%	Con	NDP	37,579	20,571	2,617	–	348	1,599	360	119	63,193
ON	Wellington—Halton Hills North	Con	Con	33,736	50.62%	4,127	6.19%	Lib	Green	29,609	33,736	1,346	–	566	1,389	–	–	66,646
ON	Whitby	Lib	Lib	35,624	52.70%	6,004	8.88%	Con	NDP	35,624	29,620	1,638	–	–	506	–	206	67,594
ON	Willowdale	Lib	Lib	25,488	53.45%	4,511	9.46%	Con	NDP	25,488	20,977	1,224	–	–	–	–	–	47,689
ON	Windsor—Tecumseh—Lakeshore	Lib	Con	32,090	45.75%	4	0.01%	Lib	NDP	32,086	32,090	4,240	–	828	468	–	426	70,138
ON	Windsor West	NDP	Con	21,412	39.01%	4,426	8.06%	Lib	NDP	16,986	21,412	15,256	–	553	397	–	284	54,888
ON	York Centre	Lib	Con	26,110	54.83%	5,792	12.16%	Lib	NDP	20,318	26,110	1,191	–	–	–	–	–	47,619
ON	York—Durham	Con	Con	40,329	55.56%	11,603	15.99%	Lib	NDP	28,726	40,329	1,829	–	901	797	–	–	72,582
ON	York South—Weston—Etobicoke	Lib	Lib	24,663	55.30%	6,917	15.51%	Con	NDP	24,663	17,746	2,190	–	–	–	–	–	44,599
MB	Brandon—Souris	Con	Con	28,624	62.19%	17,858	38.80%	Lib	NDP	10,766	28,624	6,637	–	–	–	–	–	46,027
MB	Churchill—Keewatinook Aski	NDP	Lib	9,313	45.50%	3,433	16.77%	NDP	Con	9,313	4,927	5,880	–	349	–	–	–	20,469
MB	Elmwood—Transcona	NDP	Con	19,463	41.56%	3,325	7.10%	NDP	Lib	10,512	19,463	16,138	–	396	321	–	–	46,830
MB	Kildonan—St. Paul	Con	Con	26,364	47.48%	1,556	2.80%	Lib	NDP	24,808	26,364	3,863	–	486	–	–	–	55,521
MB	Portage—Lisgar	Con	Con	31,889	69.38%	21,396	46.55%	Lib	NDP	10,493	31,889	2,011	–	977	595	–	–	45,965
MB	Provencher	Con	Con	34,364	66.34%	20,970	40.48%	Lib	NDP	13,394	34,364	2,398	–	942	705	–	–	51,803
MB	Riding Mountain	Con	Con	28,409	67.85%	19,128	45.68%	Lib	NDP	9,281	28,409	3,072	–	564	547	–	–	41,873
MB	St. Boniface—St. Vital	Lib	Lib	32,599	59.79%	14,974	27.47%	Con	NDP	32,599	17,625	3,773	–	523	–	–	–	54,520
MB	Selkirk—Interlake—Eastman	Con	Con	32,788	60.18%	16,218	29.77%	Lib	NDP	16,570	32,788	3,535	–	473	709	–	404	54,479
MB	Winnipeg Centre	NDP	NDP	13,524	39.44%	1,386	4.04%	Lib	Con	12,138	7,658	13,524	–	367	389	–	213	34,289
MB	Winnipeg North	Lib	Lib	19,792	57.92%	8,052	23.56%	Con	NDP	19,792	11,740	2,059	–	274	194	–	114	34,173
MB	Winnipeg South	Lib	Lib	27,337	59.02%	11,085	23.93%	Con	NDP	27,337	16,252	2,114	–	385	231	–	–	46,319
MB	Winnipeg South Centre	Lib	Lib	33,834	63.62%	19,086	35.89%	Con	NDP	33,834	14,748	3,463	–	272	450	97	314	53,178
MB	Winnipeg West	Con	Lib	30,276	54.46%	7,617	13.70%	Con	NDP	30,276	22,659	2,218	–	–	438	–	–	55,591
SK	Battlefords—Lloydminster—Meadow Lake	Con	Con	28,634	75.78%	21,561	57.06%	Lib	NDP	7,073	28,634	1,816	–	–	–	–	264	37,787
SK	Carlton Trail—Eagle Creek	Con	Con	36,427	77.42%	28,419	60.40%	Lib	NDP	8,008	36,427	2,616	–	–	–	–	–	47,051
SK	Desnethé—Missinippi—Churchill River	Lib	Lib	5,876	65.09%	3,575	39.60%	Con	NDP	5,876	2,301	850	–	–	–	–	–	9,027
SK	Moose Jaw—Lake Centre—Lanigan	Con	Con	32,991	71.91%	25,330	55.21%	Lib	NDP	7,661	32,991	3,458	–	1,358	411	–	–	45,879
SK	Prince Albert	Con	Con	27,763	71.47%	20,312	52.29%	Lib	NDP	7,451	27,763	3,630	–	–	–	–	–	38,844
SK	Regina—Lewvan	Con	Con	21,988	50.01%	3,095	7.04%	Lib	NDP	18,893	21,988	2,573	–	243	272	–	–	43,969
SK	Regina—Qu'Appelle	Con	Con	27,024	63.97%	15,633	37.01%	Lib	NDP	11,391	27,024	3,388	–	441	–	–	–	42,244
SK	Regina—Wascana	Con	Con	22,072	50.08%	2,820	6.40%	Lib	NDP	19,252	22,072	2,138	–	326	289	–	–	44,077
SK	Saskatoon South	Con	Con	24,516	49.27%	4,409	8.86%	Lib	NDP	20,107	24,516	4,515	–	308	310	–	–	49,756
SK	Saskatoon—University	Con	Con	23,178	48.87%	3,556	7.50%	Lib	NDP	19,622	23,178	4,035	–	327	263	–	–	47,425
SK	Saskatoon West	Con	Con	19,814	52.65%	9,560	25.40%	Lib	NDP	10,254	19,814	7,187	–	–	376	–	–	37,631
SK	Souris—Moose Mountain	Con	Con	34,793	83.98%	30,742	74.21%	Lib	NDP	4,051	34,793	1,888	–	–	235	157	304	41,428
SK	Swift Current—Grasslands—Kindersley	Con	Con	32,292	81.98%	27,872	70.76%	Lib	NDP	4,420	32,292	2,250	–	–	–	426	–	39,388
SK	Yorkton—Melville	Con	Con	28,702	77.55%	23,364	63.12%	Lib	NDP	5,338	28,702	2,034	–	–	713	–	226	37,013
AB	Airdrie—Cochrane	Con	Con	50,252	71.22%	33,538	47.53%	Lib	NDP	16,714	50,252	2,591	–	–	–	–	1,003	70,560
AB	Battle River—Crowfoot	Con	Con	53,684	82.84%	46,118	71.16%	Lib	NDP	7,566	53,684	2,061	–	1,022	474	–	–	64,807
AB	Bow River	Con	Con	44,605	78.87%	35,043	61.96%	Lib	NDP	9,562	44,605	1,689	–	–	–	–	698	56,554
AB	Calgary Centre	Con	Con	31,604	50.21%	2,780	4.42%	Lib	NDP	28,824	31,604	1,665	–	365	362	–	126	62,946
AB	Calgary Confederation	Con	Lib	33,112	48.10%	1,273	1.85%	Con	NDP	33,112	31,839	2,844	–	302	400	–	342	68,839
AB	Calgary Crowfoot	Con	Con	39,971	58.84%	14,585	21.47%	Lib	NDP	25,386	39,971	1,741	–	360	346	131	–	67,935
AB	Calgary East	Con	Con	32,490	60.53%	15,428	28.74%	Lib	NDP	17,062	32,490	2,092	–	908	664	–	458	53,674
AB	Calgary Heritage	Con	Con	42,088	61.45%	18,415	26.89%	Lib	NDP	23,673	42,088	1,691	–	–	493	280	268	68,493
AB	Calgary McKnight	Lib	Con	20,863	49.11%	1,317	3.10%	Lib	NDP	19,546	20,863	1,204	–	323	273	–	269	42,478
AB	Calgary Midnapore	Con	Con	48,131	65.54%	26,152	35.61%	Lib	NDP	21,979	48,131	2,271	–	556	495	–	–	73,432
AB	Calgary Nose Hill	Con	Con	36,597	59.42%	14,321	23.25%	Lib	NDP	22,276	36,597	1,975	–	–	430	–	314	61,592
AB	Calgary Shepard	Con	Con	44,363	67.99%	25,942	39.76%	Lib	NDP	18,421	44,363	1,780	–	383	302	–	–	65,249
AB	Calgary Signal Hill	Con	Con	41,638	60.15%	16,464	23.78%	Lib	NDP	25,174	41,638	1,656	–	492	–	–	265	69,225
AB	Calgary Skyview	Con	Con	27,808	55.45%	8,966	17.88%	Lib	NDP	18,842	27,808	1,351	–	–	–	2,151	–	50,152
AB	Edmonton Centre	Con	Lib	24,138	44.35%	3,512	6.45%	Con	NDP	24,138	20,626	8,440	–	468	–	398	358	54,428
AB	Edmonton Gateway	Con	Con	26,385	50.59%	6,950	13.33%	Lib	NDP	19,435	26,385	2,565	–	474	–	3,293 (Note: Rod Loyola had been the nominated Liberal candidate until he was removed by the national office. Continuing as an independent, he received 2,455 votes.)	–	52,152
AB	Edmonton Griesbach	NDP	Con	22,256	45.45%	5,539	11.31%	NDP	Lib	8,973	22,256	16,717	–	318	302	118	282	48,966
AB	Edmonton Manning	Con	Con	26,445	53.09%	8,842	17.75%	Lib	NDP	17,603	26,445	4,935	–	824	–	–	–	49,807
AB	Edmonton Northwest	Con	Con	29,194	53.44%	8,287	15.17%	Lib	NDP	20,907	29,194	3,597	–	593	335	–	–	54,626
AB	Edmonton Riverbend	Con	Con	30,343	50.24%	3,268	5.41%	Lib	NDP	27,075	30,343	2,563	–	410	–	–	–	60,391
AB	Edmonton Southeast	Con	Con	25,206	52.88%	6,725	14.11%	Lib	NDP	18,481	25,206	2,536	–	881	–	292	268	47,664
AB	Edmonton Strathcona	NDP	NDP	28,027	46.96%	8,259	13.84%	Con	Lib	10,709	19,768	28,027	–	386	366	250	181	59,687
AB	Edmonton West	Con	Con	31,201	52.87%	7,206	12.21%	Lib	NDP	23,995	31,201	3,164	–	534	–	–	121	59,015
AB	Foothills	Con	Con	54,874	76.33%	41,168	57.27%	Lib	NDP	13,706	54,874	1,923	–	796	589	–	–	71,888
AB	Fort McMurray—Cold Lake	Con	Con	39,649	80.15%	32,456	65.61%	Lib	NDP	7,193	39,649	1,337	–	896	290	101	–	49,466
AB	Grande Prairie	Con	Con	47,904	81.67%	40,958	69.83%	Lib	NDP	6,946	47,904	2,460	–	828	–	223	291	58,652
AB	Lakeland	Con	Con	45,826	80.97%	38,940	68.81%	Lib	NDP	6,886	45,826	2,153	–	982	411	–	335	56,593
AB	Leduc—Wetaskiwin	Con	Con	47,947	74.73%	36,811	57.37%	Lib	NDP	11,136	47,947	3,927	–	688	–	–	463	64,161
AB	Lethbridge	Con	Con	40,866	61.05%	18,967	28.34%	Lib	NDP	21,899	40,866	2,431	–	478	457	–	806	66,937
AB	Medicine Hat—Cardston—Warner	Con	Con	41,518	76.74%	31,964	59.08%	Lib	NDP	9,554	41,518	2,588	–	–	440	–	–	54,100
AB	Parkland	Con	Con	53,468	75.19%	40,778	57.35%	Lib	NDP	12,690	53,468	2,949	–	1,066	449	–	485	71,107
AB	Peace River—Westlock	Con	Con	41,130	77.07%	34,852	65.30%	Lib	Ind	6,278	41,130	2,913	–	–	–	3,048	–	53,369
AB	Ponoka—Didsbury	Con	Con	56,106	81.81%	48,692	71.00%	NDP	UPC	–	56,106	7,414	–	1,289	–	1,641 (Note: Zarnab Zafar was nominated as the Liberal candidate, but was not identified as such because of a flaw in her nomination papers. She was endorsed by the Liberals, and came in at 4th place.)	2,129	68,579
AB	Red Deer	Con	Con	44,239	71.55%	30,675	49.61%	Lib	NDP	13,564	44,239	2,375	–	813	618	–	219	61,828
AB	Sherwood Park—Fort Saskatchewan	Con	Con	54,131	66.32%	31,953	39.15%	Lib	NDP	22,178	54,131	4,136	–	497	448	–	237	81,627
AB	St. Albert—Sturgeon River	Con	Con	49,216	63.95%	26,239	34.09%	Lib	NDP	22,977	49,216	3,684	–	820	–	–	264	76,961
AB	Yellowhead	Con	Con	47,863	69.08%	30,394	43.86%	Lib	NDP	17,469	47,863	2,753	–	952	–	–	253	69,290
BC	Abbotsford—South Langley	Con	Con	24,116	43.09%	5,147	9.20%	Lib	Ind	18,969	24,116	2,104	–	459	577	9,747 (Note: Mike de Jong, previously a Liberal MLA and Cabinet minister in BC, was originally recommended for the Conservative nomination, but was disqualified by the national office.)	–	55,972
BC	Burnaby Central	NDP	Lib	21,745	42.23%	1,856	3.60%	Con	NDP	21,745	19,889	9,353	–	506	–	–	–	51,493
BC	Burnaby North—Seymour	Lib	Lib	37,829	59.05%	16,087	25.11%	Con	NDP	37,829	21,742	4,121	–	366	–	–	–	64,058
BC	Cariboo—Prince George	Con	Con	38,175	60.32%	18,932	29.91%	Lib	NDP	19,243	38,175	3,900	–	436	1,155	208	174	63,291
BC	Chilliwack—Hope	Con	Con	36,027	54.79%	12,773	19.43%	Lib	NDP	23,254	36,027	4,779	–	482	1,083	–	129	65,754
BC	Cloverdale—Langley City	Lib	Con	25,606	47.80%	778	1.45%	Lib	NDP	24,828	25,606	2,350	–	289	493	–	–	53,566
BC	Columbia—Kootenay—Southern Rockies	Con	Con	36,081	50.43%	15,897	22.22%	Lib	NDP	20,184	36,081	12,871	–	486	1,064	856	–	71,542
BC	Coquitlam—Port Coquitlam	Lib	Lib	27,250	47.37%	2,520	4.38%	Con	NDP	27,250	24,730	4,253	–	–	504	–	785	57,522
BC	Courtenay—Alberni	NDP	NDP	31,617	39.64%	3,589	4.50%	Con	Lib	18,078	28,028	31,617	–	427	1,352	–	264	79,766
BC	Cowichan—Malahat—Langford	NDP	Con	28,370	37.24%	3,544	4.65%	NDP	Lib	21,478	28,370	24,826	–	–	1,500	–	–	76,174
BC	Delta	Lib	Lib	32,802	51.83%	5,488	8.67%	Con	NDP	32,802	27,314	2,787	–	390	–	–	–	63,293
BC	Esquimalt—Saanich—Sooke	NDP	Lib	36,181	49.34%	15,099	20.59%	Con	NDP	36,181	21,082	13,666	–	–	1,959	152	295	73,335
BC	Fleetwood—Port Kells	Lib	Lib	23,250	47.91%	1,811	3.73%	Con	NDP	23,250	21,439	2,885	–	499	460	–	–	48,533
BC	Kamloops—Shuswap—Central Rockies	Con	Con	35,556	52.25%	9,027	13.26%	Lib	NDP	26,529	35,556	3,730	–	602	1,639	–	–	68,056
BC	Kamloops—Thompson—Nicola	Con	Con	32,008	51.54%	7,047	11.35%	Lib	NDP	24,961	32,008	3,681	–	516	936	–	–	62,102
BC	Kelowna	Con	Lib	28,702	48.78%	1,082	1.84%	Con	NDP	28,702	27,620	1,941	–	–	578	–	–	58,841
BC	Langley Township—Fraser Heights	Con	Con	33,574	51.37%	5,540	8.48%	Lib	NDP	28,034 (Note: John Aldag was previously elected as an Liberal MP for Cloverdale—Langley City in 2021, but resigned in 2024 to campaign in (but fail to win) Langley-Abbotsford in the 2024 British Columbia general election as a BC NDP candidate.)	33,574	2,611	–	303	491	–	347	65,360
BC	Mission—Matsqui—Abbotsford	Con	Con	33,791	56.70%	11,953	20.06%	Lib	NDP	21,838	33,791	2,745	–	502	723	–	–	59,599
BC	Nanaimo—Ladysmith	NDP	Con	26,381	35.46%	5,725	7.70%	Lib	NDP	20,656	26,381	13,586	–	289	13,485	–	–	74,397
BC	New Westminster—Burnaby—Maillardville	NDP	Lib	19,547	35.09%	1,973	3.54%	NDP	Con	19,547	17,507	17,574	–	–	690	385	–	55,703
BC	North Island—Powell River	NDP	Con	31,356	38.75%	4,999	6.18%	NDP	Lib	21,218	31,356	26,357	–	341	1,505	152	–	80,929
BC	North Vancouver—Capilano	Lib	Lib	37,907	59.82%	16,568	26.15%	Con	NDP	37,907	21,339	2,684	–	256	1,076	102	–	63,364
BC	Okanagan Lake West—South Kelowna	Con	Con	33,219	50.92%	4,392	6.73%	Lib	NDP	28,827	33,219	2,189	–	307	602	–	90	65,234
BC	Pitt Meadows—Maple Ridge	Con	Con	31,924	47.41%	1,196	1.78%	Lib	NDP	30,728	31,924	4,141	–	368	–	–	172	67,333
BC	Port Moody—Coquitlam	NDP	Lib	27,074	43.53%	1,948	3.13%	Con	NDP	27,074	25,126	9,360	–	–	519	–	117	62,196
BC	Prince George—Peace River—Northern Rockies	Con	Con	41,956	71.12%	30,411	51.55%	Lib	NDP	11,545	41,956	3,542	–	690	1,259	–	–	58,992
BC	Richmond Centre—Marpole	Lib	Con	23,532	49.56%	2,300	4.84%	Lib	NDP	21,232	23,532	2,109	–	193	420	–	–	47,486
BC	Richmond East—Steveston	Lib	Lib	25,705	48.45%	1,100	2.07%	Con	NDP	25,705	24,605	2,251	–	–	494	–	–	53,055
BC	Saanich—Gulf Islands	Green	Green	31,199	39.10%	5,790	7.26%	Lib	Con	25,409	20,015	3,163	–	–	31,199	–	–	79,786
BC	Similkameen—South Okanagan—West Kootenay	NDP	Con	30,054	44.06%	4,623	6.78%	Lib	NDP	25,431	30,054	11,033	–	654	1,044	–	–	68,216
BC	Skeena—Bulkley Valley	NDP	Con	21,202	47.19%	3,525	7.85%	NDP	Lib	4,923	21,202	17,677	–	–	528	–	602	44,932
BC	South Surrey—White Rock	Con	Lib	33,094	50.50%	3,170	4.84%	Con	NDP	33,094	29,924	1,634	–	–	875	–	–	65,527
BC	Surrey Centre	Lib	Lib	19,900	48.01%	1,980	4.78%	Con	NDP	19,900	17,920	2,811	–	246	395	–	182	41,454
BC	Surrey Newton	Lib	Lib	20,263	49.45%	2,240	5.47%	Con	NDP	20,263	18,023	2,467	–	–	–	–	222	40,975
BC	Vancouver Centre	Lib	Lib	29,855	55.22%	13,487	24.95%	Con	NDP	29,855	16,368	6,807	–	211	757	63	–	54,061
BC	Vancouver East	NDP	NDP	24,945	43.65%	4,658	8.15%	Lib	Con	20,287	10,162	24,945	–	329	1,099	–	329	57,151
BC	Vancouver Fraserview—South Burnaby	Lib	Lib	27,117	52.30%	8,617	16.62%	Con	NDP	27,117 (Note: Gregor Robertson was also previously Mayor of Vancouver.)	18,500	5,088	–	482	658	–	–	51,845
BC	Vancouver Granville	Lib	Lib	37,010	62.12%	19,877	33.36%	Con	NDP	37,010	17,133	4,489	–	–	945	–	–	59,577
BC	Vancouver Kingsway	NDP	NDP	18,788	37.24%	303	0.60%	Lib	Con	18,485	12,352	18,788	–	322	499	–	–	50,446
BC	Vancouver Quadra	Lib	Lib	35,384	63.19%	18,376	32.82%	Con	NDP	35,384	17,008	2,391	–	182	1,032	–	–	55,997
BC	Vernon—Lake Country—Monashee	Con	Con	33,850	50.42%	5,081	7.57%	Lib	NDP	28,769	33,850	3,417	–	–	1,105	–	–	67,141
BC	Victoria	NDP	Lib	41,128	54.28%	22,251	29.37%	NDP	Con	41,128	12,870	18,877	–	278	2,350	73	192	75,768
BC	West Vancouver—Sunshine Coast—Sea to Sky Country	Lib	Lib	38,384	59.74%	17,203	26.78%	Con	Green	38,384	21,181	2,070	–	308	2,205	–	99	64,247
Terr	Yukon	Lib	Lib	12,009	53.05%	3,290	14.53%	Con	NDP	12,009	8,719	1,434	–	–	474	–	–	22,636
Terr	Northwest Territories	Lib	Lib	8,855	53.51%	3,342	20.19%	Con	NDP	8,855	5,513	2,011	–	–	170	–	–	16,549
Terr	Nunavut	NDP	NDP	2,853	37.26%	41	0.54%	Lib	Con	2,812	1,992	2,853	–	–	–	–	–	7,657

= newly created ridings
= open seat
= winning candidate was in previous House
= not incumbent; was previously elected as an MP
= incumbent had switched allegiance
= incumbency arose from byelection gain
= previously incumbent in another riding
= other incumbents renominated
= Previously a member of one of the provincial/territorial legislatures
= multiple candidates
= Result contested and declared void

== Comparative analysis for ridings (2025 vs. 2021) ==
Ternary plots of election results
2021 (transposed results)

2025
Electoral districts won identified by Conservative (blue), Liberal (red), NDP (orange), BQ (cyan) and Green (Green)

2025 Canadian federal election: Summary of riding results by vote share for winning candidate and by swing (vs. 2021 transposed results)
Riding and winning party				Vote share (Note: Share won by winning candidate, with difference noted from share achieved by the same party in 2021.)		Swing (Note: Positive indicates improvement to standing of party winning in 2021; negative points to 2021's second-place party being swung to.)		
Riding and winning party				%	Change (pp)	From	To	Change (pp)
NL	Avalon	Lib	Hold	58.61	7.73	Con	Lib	2.36
NL	Cape Spear	Lib	Hold	68.25	13.53	NDP	Lib	15.67
NL	Central Newfoundland	Con	Hold	54.08	7.19	Lib	Con	4.82
NL	Labrador	Lib	Hold	51.50	8.83	Lib	Con	−1.28
NL	Long Range Mountains	Con	Gain	50.35	10.99	Lib	Con	−6.32
NL	St. John's East	Lib	Hold	62.28	17.14	NDP	Lib	20.37
NL	Terra Nova—The Peninsulas	Con	Gain	47.96	7.51	Lib	Con	−3.42
PE	Cardigan	Lib	Hold	57.02	6.46	Lib	Con	−0.01
PE	Charlottetown	Lib	Hold	64.75	18.06	Con	Lib	10.00
PE	Egmont	Lib	Hold	51.92	5.98	Lib	Con	−3.19
PE	Malpeque	Lib	Hold	57.60	15.58	Con	Lib	6.04
NS	Acadie—Annapolis	Con	Hold	47.67	−3.64	Con	Lib	−9.76
NS	Cape Breton—Canso—Antigonish	Lib	Hold	51.59	6.16	Lib	Con	−0.98
NS	Central Nova	Lib	Hold	51.93	7.63	Lib	Con	−1.13
NS	Cumberland—Colchester	Lib	Gain	48.31	14.11	Con	Lib	−7.15
NS	Dartmouth—Cole Harbour	Lib	Hold	67.69	16.19	NDP	Lib	21.05
NS	Halifax	Lib	Hold	63.05	20.81	NDP	Lib	22.27
NS	Halifax West	Lib	Hold	65.60	18.04	NDP	Lib	19.23
NS	Kings—Hants	Lib	Hold	60.56	16.16	Con	Lib	6.50
NS	Sackville—Bedford—Preston	Lib	Hold	61.97	17.32	Con	Lib	4.95
NS	South Shore—St. Margarets	Lib	Gain	54.88	19.30	Con	Lib	−10.78
NS	Sydney—Glace Bay	Lib	Hold	54.63	12.70	Con	Lib	4.38
NB	Acadie—Bathurst	Lib	Hold	67.48	2.51	Lib	Con	−4.82
NB	Beauséjour	Lib	Hold	60.60	5.07	Lib	Con	−4.41
NB	Fredericton—Oromocto	Lib	Hold	61.29	23.51	Con	Lib	12.86
NB	Fundy Royal	Con	Hold	53.37	7.04	Con	Lib	−3.75
NB	Madawaska—Restigouche	Lib	Hold	55.18	3.19	Lib	Con	−4.34
NB	Miramichi—Grand Lake	Con	Hold	48.15	2.69	Con	Lib	−3.73
NB	Moncton—Dieppe	Lib	Hold	63.00	12.97	Con	Lib	2.17
NB	Saint John—Kennebecasis	Lib	Hold	58.11	15.51	Con	Lib	7.28
NB	Saint John—St. Croix	Con	Hold	53.08	6.09	Con	Lib	−3.67
NB	Tobique—Mactaquac	Con	Hold	58.79	5.97	Con	Lib	−3.62
QC	Abitibi—Baie-James—Nunavik—Eeyou	Lib	Gain	41.16	15.19	BQ	Lib	−9.57
QC	Abitibi—Témiscamingue	BQ	Hold	49.43	−1.17	BQ	Lib	−2.05
QC	Ahuntsic-Cartierville	Lib	Hold	60.96	9.05	BQ	Lib	7.40
QC	Alfred-Pellan	Lib	Hold	54.59	6.87	BQ	Lib	6.57
QC	Argenteuil—La Petite-Nation	Lib	Hold	47.48	8.32	BQ	Lib	9.15
QC	Beauce	Con	Hold	59.71	11.42	PPC	Con	11.92
QC	Beauharnois—Salaberry—Soulanges—Huntingdon	BQ	Hold	43.92	−4.40	BQ	Lib	−4.61
QC	Beauport—Limoilou	Lib	Gain	35.59	10.95	BQ	Con	−1.02
QC	Bécancour—Nicolet—Saurel—Alnôbak	BQ	Hold	46.96	−7.84	BQ	Lib	−9.11
QC	Bellechasse—Les Etchemins—Lévis	Con	Hold	49.08	−2.92	BQ	Con	0.56
QC	Beloeil—Chambly	BQ	Hold	48.26	−5.27	BQ	Lib	−7.92
QC	Berthier—Maskinongé	BQ	Hold	34.99	−0.95	NDP	BQ	5.01
QC	Bourassa	Lib	Hold	58.55	−1.83	Lib	BQ	−0.14
QC	Brome—Missisquoi	Lib	Hold	48.26	13.31	BQ	Lib	9.95
QC	Brossard—Saint-Lambert	Lib	Hold	62.21	8.11	BQ	Lib	7.35
QC	Charlesbourg—Haute-Saint-Charles	Con	Hold	42.44	−2.59	BQ	Con	1.57
QC	Châteauguay—Les Jardins-de-Napierville	Lib	Gain	45.16	8.65	BQ	Lib	−8.09
QC	Chicoutimi—Le Fjord	Con	Hold	34.14	−6.24	Con	BQ	−1.68
QC	Compton—Stanstead	Lib	Hold	45.64	8.98	BQ	Lib	6.56
QC	Côte-du-Sud—Rivière-du-Loup—Kataskomiq—Témiscouata	Con	Hold	45.84	0.95	BQ	Con	5.38
QC	Côte-Nord—Kawawachikamach—Nitassinan	BQ	Hold	43.68	−8.94	BQ	Con	−6.15
QC	Dorval—Lachine—LaSalle	Lib	Hold	59.36	7.12	BQ	Lib	5.14
QC	Drummond	BQ	Hold	42.80	−3.82	BQ	Lib	−6.74
QC	Gaspésie—Les Îles-de-la-Madeleine—Listuguj	BQ	Hold	45.79	1.45	Lib	BQ	1.46
QC	Gatineau	Lib	Hold	60.54	10.49	BQ	Lib	8.79
QC	Hochelaga—Rosemont-Est	Lib	Hold	46.14	7.71	BQ	Lib	5.97
QC	Honoré-Mercier	Lib	Hold	60.16	0.16	BQ	Lib	1.76
QC	Hull—Aylmer	Lib	Hold	62.11	9.65	BQ	Lib	6.81
QC	Joliette—Manawan	BQ	Hold	49.27	−5.87	BQ	Lib	−7.42
QC	Jonquière	BQ	Hold	39.99	−3.12	BQ	Con	−2.53
QC	La Pointe-de-l'Île	BQ	Hold	43.11	−3.55	BQ	Lib	−4.46
QC	La Prairie—Atateken	Lib	Gain	44.06	9.45	BQ	Lib	−9.19
QC	Lac-Saint-Jean	BQ	Hold	46.21	−4.69	BQ	Con	−2.06
QC	Lac-Saint-Louis	Lib	Hold	67.63	11.37	Con	Lib	3.30
QC	LaSalle—Émard—Verdun	Lib	Hold	50.86	7.44	BQ	Lib	4.01
QC	Laurentides—Labelle	BQ	Hold	44.57	−7.74	BQ	Lib	−9.61
QC	Laurier—Sainte-Marie	Lib	Hold	52.07	12.57	NDP	Lib	12.09
QC	Laval—Les Îles	Lib	Hold	49.73	0.79	BQ	Lib	2.65
QC	Les Pays-d'en-Haut	Lib	Gain	41.04	15.15	BQ	Lib	−13.27
QC	Lévis—Lotbinière	Con	Hold	47.71	−1.99	BQ	Con	0.66
QC	Longueuil—Charles-LeMoyne	Lib	Hold	49.39	8.95	BQ	Lib	8.77
QC	Longueuil—Saint-Hubert	Lib	Gain	40.98	2.67	BQ	Lib	−2.09
QC	Louis-Hébert	Lib	Hold	55.44	17.23	BQ	Lib	11.45
QC	Louis-Saint-Laurent—Akiawenhrahk	Con	Hold	44.86	−7.17	Con	BQ	−2.99
QC	Marc-Aurèle-Fortin	Lib	Hold	51.99	7.88	BQ	Lib	7.54
QC	Mégantic—L'Érable—Lotbinière	Con	Hold	58.79	2.08	BQ	Con	2.65
QC	Mirabel	BQ	Hold	39.91	−5.91	BQ	Lib	−7.44
QC	Mount Royal	Lib	Hold	51.06	−6.35	Lib	Con	−11.37
QC	Mont-Saint-Bruno—L'Acadie	Lib	Gain	47.10	12.99	BQ	Lib	−11.69
QC	Montcalm	BQ	Hold	46.60	−6.62	BQ	Lib	−6.79
QC	Montmorency—Charlevoix	Con	Gain	34.50	0.62	BQ	Con	−1.85
QC	Notre-Dame-de-Grâce—Westmount	Lib	Hold	63.99	11.15	NDP	Lib	11.92
QC	Outremont	Lib	Hold	55.20	10.84	NDP	Lib	13.74
QC	Papineau	Lib	Hold	52.98	2.68	NDP	Lib	4.52
QC	Pierre-Boucher—Les Patriotes—Verchères	BQ	Hold	46.08	−8.18	BQ	Lib	−10.56
QC	Pierrefonds—Dollard	Lib	Hold	60.08	4.07	Lib	Con	−2.83
QC	Pontiac—Kitigan Zibi	Lib	Hold	54.60	10.74	Con	Lib	2.27
QC	Portneuf—Jacques-Cartier	Con	Hold	49.56	−2.79	BQ	Con	1.54
QC	Québec Centre	Lib	Hold	49.50	13.78	BQ	Lib	3.47
QC	Repentigny	BQ	Hold	42.20	−9.16	BQ	Lib	−9.89
QC	Richmond—Arthabaska	Con	Hold	35.50	−14.38	Con	BQ	−8.48
QC	Rimouski—La Matapédia	BQ	Hold	46.16	−8.13	BQ	Lib	−10.79
QC	Rivière-des-Mille-Îles	Lib	Gain	45.63	10.27	BQ	Lib	−8.98
QC	Rivière-du-Nord	BQ	Hold	43.85	−7.76	BQ	Lib	−8.45
QC	Rosemont—La Petite-Patrie	NDP	Hold	40.99	−7.58	NDP	Lib	−7.99
QC	Saint-Hyacinthe—Bagot—Acton	BQ	Hold	43.88	−3.57	BQ	Lib	−7.26
QC	Saint-Jean	BQ	Hold	44.34	−1.67	BQ	Lib	−3.90
QC	Saint-Laurent	Lib	Hold	58.89	−0.45	Lib	Con	−5.19
QC	Saint-Léonard—Saint-Michel	Lib	Hold	65.34	−4.26	Lib	Con	−7.19
QC	Saint-Maurice—Champlain	Lib	Hold	49.96	7.51	BQ	Lib	8.20
QC	Shefford	BQ	Hold	40.11	−1.81	BQ	Lib	−3.79
QC	Sherbrooke	Lib	Hold	51.29	13.75	BQ	Lib	8.07
QC	Terrebonne	Lib	Gain	38.74	9.37	BQ	Lib	−6.02
QC	Thérèse-De Blainville	Lib	Gain	45.84	10.64	BQ	Lib	−9.62
QC	Trois-Rivières	Lib	Gain	41.01	12.38	Con	BQ	0.10
QC	Vaudreuil	Lib	Hold	57.87	10.40	BQ	Lib	8.22
QC	Ville-Marie—Le Sud-Ouest—Île-des-Sœurs	Lib	Hold	63.70	12.33	NDP	Lib	12.18
QC	Vimy	Lib	Hold	53.41	3.27	BQ	Lib	4.22
ON	Ajax	Lib	Hold	56.32	−0.51	Lib	Con	−6.50
ON	Algonquin—Renfrew—Pembroke	Con	Hold	55.71	6.20	NDP	Con	11.74
ON	Aurora—Oak Ridges—Richmond Hill	Con	Gain	54.73	12.60	Lib	Con	−7.30
ON	Barrie South—Innisfil	Con	Hold	57.84	10.17	Lib	Con	0.55
ON	Barrie—Springwater—Oro-Medonte	Con	Hold	51.67	5.88	Con	Lib	−4.03
ON	Bay of Quinte	Lib	Gain	50.39	13.37	Con	Lib	−4.63
ON	Beaches—East York	Lib	Hold	67.75	11.17	NDP	Lib	13.42
ON	Bowmanville—Oshawa North	Con	Hold	49.77	5.02	Con	Lib	−4.84
ON	Brampton Centre	Lib	Hold	48.37	0.05	Lib	Con	−7.70
ON	Brampton—Chinguacousy Park	Lib	Hold	48.85	−1.96	Lib	Con	−7.70
ON	Brampton East	Lib	Hold	48.59	−4.61	Lib	Con	−10.38
ON	Brampton North—Caledon	Lib	Hold	49.03	−2.41	Lib	Con	−8.33
ON	Brampton South	Lib	Hold	49.33	−4.55	Lib	Con	−11.30
ON	Brampton West	Con	Gain	49.81	22.08	Lib	Con	−15.37
ON	Brantford—Brant South—Six Nations	Con	Hold	52.44	12.36	Con	Lib	−0.50
ON	Bruce—Grey—Owen Sound	Con	Hold	53.03	3.85	Con	Lib	−5.51
ON	Burlington	Lib	Hold	55.80	10.07	Con	Lib	3.38
ON	Burlington North—Milton West	Lib	Hold	52.75	4.85	Lib	Con	−1.40
ON	Cambridge	Con	Gain	48.56	14.42	Lib	Con	−3.16
ON	Carleton	Lib	Gain	50.95	19.09	Con	Lib	−12.62
ON	Chatham-Kent—Leamington	Con	Hold	57.51	15.08	Lib	Con	2.96
ON	Davenport	Lib	Hold	57.81	14.21	NDP	Lib	18.35
ON	Don Valley North	Lib	Hold	53.21	0.45	Lib	Con	−4.68
ON	Don Valley West	Lib	Hold	62.63	5.41	Con	Lib	1.05
ON	Dufferin—Caledon	Con	Hold	60.14	11.10	Lib	Con	2.29
ON	Eglinton—Lawrence	Lib	Hold	49.29	0.81	Lib	Con	−5.29
ON	Elgin—St. Thomas—London South	Con	Hold	50.14	0.89	Con	Lib	−11.29
ON	Essex	Con	Hold	57.52	16.56	NDP	Con	21.72
ON	Etobicoke Centre	Lib	Hold	53.60	5.46	Lib	Con	−2.23
ON	Etobicoke—Lakeshore	Lib	Hold	57.41	10.28	Con	Lib	1.98
ON	Etobicoke North	Lib	Hold	52.58	−6.30	Lib	Con	−10.92
ON	Flamborough—Glanbrook—Brant North	Con	Hold	52.70	8.92	Con	Lib	−0.89
ON	Guelph	Lib	Hold	54.67	13.30	Con	Lib	3.01
ON	Haldimand—Norfolk	Con	Hold	57.56	10.17	Lib	Con	0.66
ON	Haliburton—Kawartha Lakes	Con	Hold	56.56	4.58	Con	Lib	−5.13
ON	Hamilton Centre	Lib	Gain	37.55	10.82	NDP	Lib	−14.33
ON	Hamilton East—Stoney Creek	Con	Gain	48.70	18.58	Lib	Con	−5.57
ON	Hamilton Mountain	Lib	Hold	45.58	11.09	NDP	Lib	15.44
ON	Hamilton West—Ancaster—Dundas	Lib	Hold	56.10	11.81	Con	Lib	2.05
ON	Hastings—Lennox and Addington—Tyendinaga	Con	Hold	54.32	8.74	Lib	Con	1.43
ON	Humber River—Black Creek	Lib	Hold	55.62	−5.07	Lib	Con	−11.73
ON	Huron—Bruce	Con	Hold	53.16	2.22	Con	Lib	−6.57
ON	Kanata	Lib	Hold	60.76	17.60	Con	Lib	9.39
ON	Kapuskasing—Timmins—Mushkegowuk	Con	Gain	48.93	23.75	NDP	Lib	−19.08
ON	Kenora—Kiiwetinoong	Con	Hold	48.75	5.43	NDP	Con	10.41
ON	Kingston and the Islands	Lib	Hold	63.23	22.54	NDP	Lib	23.30
ON	King—Vaughan	Con	Hold	61.53	16.67	Lib	Con	11.81
ON	Kitchener Centre	Con	Gain	34.25	9.40	Green	Con	−4.58
ON	Kitchener—Conestoga	Lib	Hold	48.32	10.03	Con	Lib	0.09
ON	Kitchener South—Hespeler	Con	Gain	47.94	12.40	Lib	Con	−1.80
ON	Lanark—Frontenac	Con	Hold	50.41	0.72	Con	Lib	−9.51
ON	Leeds—Grenville—Thousand Islands—Rideau Lakes	Con	Hold	50.05	−0.48	Con	Lib	−9.84
ON	London Centre	Lib	Hold	56.74	19.19	NDP	Lib	19.95
ON	London—Fanshawe	Con	Gain	40.58	16.31	NDP	Con	−16.12
ON	London West	Lib	Hold	56.22	19.35	Con	Lib	8.25
ON	Markham—Stouffville	Lib	Hold	51.36	−0.19	Lib	Con	−5.35
ON	Markham—Thornhill	Lib	Hold	54.54	−7.00	Lib	Con	−11.13
ON	Markham—Unionville	Con	Gain	50.65	8.22	Lib	Con	−4.70
ON	Middlesex—London	Con	Hold	51.67	6.42	Con	Lib	−4.26
ON	Milton East—Halton Hills South	Lib	Hold	48.25	6.54	Lib	Con	−0.22
ON	Mississauga Centre	Lib	Hold	53.85	−0.03	Lib	Con	−6.52
ON	Mississauga East—Cooksville	Lib	Hold	50.20	−0.07	Lib	Con	−6.54
ON	Mississauga—Erin Mills	Lib	Hold	55.71	4.52	Lib	Con	−0.97
ON	Mississauga—Lakeshore	Lib	Hold	52.35	7.35	Con	Lib	0.94
ON	Mississauga—Malton	Lib	Hold	53.30	0.62	Lib	Con	−5.38
ON	Mississauga—Streetsville	Lib	Hold	51.53	4.19	Lib	Con	−3.17
ON	Nepean	Lib	Hold	63.78	18.04	Con	Lib	9.08
ON	Newmarket—Aurora	Con	Gain	50.62	12.46	Lib	Con	−4.61
ON	New Tecumseth—Gwillimbury	Con	Hold	59.35	11.68	Lib	Con	2.49
ON	Niagara Falls—Niagara-on-the-Lake	Con	Hold	49.14	11.71	Lib	Con	1.01
ON	Niagara South	Con	Hold	47.81	14.40	Lib	Con	1.72
ON	Niagara West	Con	Hold	51.72	7.69	Con	Lib	−2.23
ON	Nipissing—Timiskaming	Lib	Hold	47.24	10.38	Lib	Con	−1.17
ON	Northumberland—Clarke	Con	Hold	48.97	4.98	Con	Lib	−3.43
ON	Oakville East	Lib	Hold	51.14	4.92	Lib	Con	−0.25
ON	Oakville West	Lib	Hold	53.08	5.59	Lib	Con	−0.18
ON	Orléans	Lib	Hold	67.44	15.10	Con	Lib	7.88
ON	Oshawa	Con	Hold	48.17	8.46	NDP	Con	14.64
ON	Ottawa Centre	Lib	Hold	62.73	17.50	NDP	Lib	15.31
ON	Ottawa South	Lib	Hold	65.18	15.77	Con	Lib	7.84
ON	Ottawa—Vanier—Gloucester	Lib	Hold	67.37	18.37	NDP	Lib	17.03
ON	Ottawa West—Nepean	Lib	Hold	63.64	18.22	Con	Lib	9.41
ON	Oxford	Con	Hold	53.38	6.59	Con	Lib	−5.45
ON	Parry Sound—Muskoka	Con	Hold	52.19	4.26	Con	Lib	−8.36
ON	Perth—Wellington	Con	Hold	53.01	4.45	Con	Lib	−5.86
ON	Peterborough	Lib	Gain	54.25	19.43	Con	Lib	−8.79
ON	Pickering—Brooklin	Lib	Hold	54.16	6.00	Lib	Con	−0.45
ON	Prescott—Russell—Cumberland	Lib	Hold	54.78	7.56	Lib	Con	−0.19
ON	Richmond Hill South	Con	Gain	52.26	13.50	Lib	Con	−8.47
ON	Sarnia—Lambton—Bkejwanong	Con	Hold	53.15	6.64	NDP	Con	11.14
ON	Sault Ste. Marie—Algoma	Lib	Gain	47.36	15.00	Con	Lib	−2.94
ON	Scarborough—Agincourt	Lib	Hold	54.31	−1.93	Lib	Con	−7.80
ON	Scarborough Centre—Don Valley East	Lib	Hold	57.31	0.99	Lib	Con	−5.88
ON	Scarborough—Guildwood—Rouge Park	Lib	Hold	63.96	2.67	Lib	Con	−3.47
ON	Scarborough North	Lib	Hold	62.95	−4.03	Lib	Con	−9.54
ON	Scarborough Southwest	Lib	Hold	61.49	3.53	Lib	Con	−3.22
ON	Scarborough—Woburn	Lib	Hold	60.38	−0.03	Lib	Con	−5.81
ON	Simcoe—Grey	Con	Hold	52.08	4.65	Con	Lib	−5.42
ON	Simcoe North	Con	Hold	48.41	6.23	Con	Lib	−3.82
ON	Spadina—Harbourfront	Lib	Hold	60.07	21.84	NDP	Lib	23.96
ON	St. Catharines	Lib	Hold	52.01	14.15	Con	Lib	3.04
ON	Stormont—Dundas—Glengarry	Con	Hold	56.32	1.99	Con	Lib	−6.53
ON	Sudbury	Lib	Hold	51.86	16.88	NDP	Lib	19.04
ON	Sudbury East—Manitoulin—Nickel Belt	Con	Gain	48.33	21.43	NDP	Lib	15.96
ON	Taiaiako’n—Parkdale—High Park	Lib	Hold	55.79	13.00	NDP	Lib	14.21
ON	Thornhill	Con	Hold	66.38	14.66	Lib	Con	9.76
ON	Thunder Bay—Rainy River	Lib	Hold	48.53	14.27	Con	Lib	0.31
ON	Thunder Bay—Superior North	Lib	Hold	55.22	14.82	NDP	Lib	17.71
ON	Toronto Centre	Lib	Hold	64.33	14.50	NDP	Lib	14.13
ON	Toronto—Danforth	Lib	Hold	66.56	18.20	NDP	Lib	19.46
ON	Toronto—St. Paul's	Lib	Hold	61.91	12.40	Con	Lib	2.90
ON	University—Rosedale	Lib	Hold	64.00	17.51	NDP	Lib	17.84
ON	Vaughan—Woodbridge	Con	Gain	60.01	19.75	Lib	Con	−13.93
ON	Waterloo	Lib	Hold	59.47	13.99	Con	Lib	4.44
ON	Wellington—Halton Hills North	Con	Hold	50.62	3.84	Con	Lib	−5.17
ON	Whitby	Lib	Hold	52.70	7.61	Lib	Con	−0.87
ON	Willowdale	Lib	Hold	53.45	2.25	Lib	Con	−3.94
ON	Windsor—Tecumseh—Lakeshore	Con	Gain	45.75	18.72	NDP	Lib	19.56
ON	Windsor West	Con	Gain	39.01	19.67	NDP	Lib	−9.81
ON	York Centre	Con	Gain	54.83	16.99	Lib	Con	−10.80
ON	York—Durham	Con	Hold	55.56	3.81	Con	Lib	−3.63
ON	York South—Weston—Etobicoke	Lib	Hold	55.30	−0.28	Lib	Con	−8.80
MB	Brandon—Souris	Con	Hold	62.19	2.82	NDP	Con	4.40
MB	Churchill—Keewatinook Aski	Lib	Gain	45.50	20.32	NDP	Lib	−17.08
MB	Elmwood—Transcona	Con	Gain	41.56	13.11	NDP	Con	−13.88
MB	Kildonan—St. Paul	Con	Hold	47.48	5.04	Con	Lib	−5.87
MB	Portage—Lisgar	Con	Hold	69.38	17.23	PPC	Con	18.49
MB	Provencher	Con	Hold	66.34	18.00	PPC	Con	16.84
MB	Riding Mountain	Con	Hold	67.85	8.66	NDP	Con	7.92
MB	St. Boniface—St. Vital	Lib	Hold	59.79	15.89	Con	Lib	5.93
MB	Selkirk—Interlake—Eastman	Con	Hold	60.18	3.21	NDP	Con	8.08
MB	Winnipeg Centre	NDP	Hold	39.44	−10.21	NDP	Lib	−8.33
MB	Winnipeg North	Lib	Hold	57.92	4.71	NDP	Lib	13.22
MB	Winnipeg South	Lib	Hold	59.02	10.87	Con	Lib	4.24
MB	Winnipeg South Centre	Lib	Hold	63.62	18.34	Con	Lib	9.36
MB	Winnipeg West	Lib	Gain	54.46	15.22	Con	Lib	−7.40
SK	Battlefords—Lloydminster—Meadow Lake	Con	Hold	75.78	8.52	NDP	Con	8.31
SK	Carlton Trail—Eagle Creek	Con	Hold	77.42	9.42	NDP	Con	8.95
SK	Desnethé—Missinippi—Churchill River	Lib	Hold	65.09	18.75	NDP	Lib	16.67
SK	Moose Jaw—Lake Centre—Lanigan	Con	Hold	71.91	10.92	NDP	Con	11.15
SK	Prince Albert	Con	Hold	71.47	7.38	NDP	Con	6.53
SK	Regina—Lewvan	Con	Hold	50.01	3.85	NDP	Con	16.40
SK	Regina—Qu'Appelle	Con	Hold	63.97	3.70	NDP	Con	9.17
SK	Regina—Wascana	Con	Hold	50.08	0.18	Con	Lib	−8.29
SK	Saskatoon South	Con	Hold	49.27	0.02	NDP	Con	10.79
SK	Saskatoon—University	Con	Hold	48.87	0.95	NDP	Con	13.92
SK	Saskatoon West	Con	Hold	52.65	7.29	NDP	Con	13.74
SK	Souris—Moose Mountain	Con	Hold	83.98	7.97	N/A (Note: PPC was in 2nd place in 2021, but did not contest the 2025 election.)		
SK	Swift Current—Grasslands—Kindersley	Con	Hold	81.98	9.53	NDP	Con	7.04
SK	Yorkton—Melville	Con	Hold	77.55	8.75	NDP	Con	7.68
AB	Airdrie—Cochrane	Con	Hold	71.22	11.32	NDP	Con	11.29
AB	Battle River—Crowfoot	Con	Hold	82.84	11.45	NDP	Con	8.99
AB	Bow River	Con	Hold	78.87	9.31	N/A		
AB	Calgary Centre	Con	Hold	50.21	−0.71	Con	Lib	−8.22
AB	Calgary Confederation	Lib	Gain	48.10	20.21	Con	Lib	−9.82
AB	Calgary Crowfoot	Con	Hold	58.84	3.89	Con	Lib	−5.89
AB	Calgary East	Con	Hold	60.53	7.68	Con	Lib	−2.79
AB	Calgary Heritage	Con	Hold	61.45	3.12	NDP	Con	8.97
AB	Calgary McKnight	Con	Gain	49.11	14.89	Lib	Con	−6.32
AB	Calgary Midnapore	Con	Hold	65.54	5.27	NDP	Con	10.36
AB	Calgary Nose Hill	Con	Hold	59.42	4.10	Con	Lib	−5.92
AB	Calgary Shepard	Con	Hold	67.99	6.79	NDP	Con	10.05
AB	Calgary Signal Hill	Con	Hold	60.15	0.34	Con	Lib	−8.32
AB	Calgary Skyview	Con	Hold	55.45	10.49	Lib	Con	3.02
AB	Edmonton Centre	Lib	Gain	44.35	13.14	Con	Lib	−3.92
AB	Edmonton Gateway	Con	Hold	50.59	7.48	Con	Lib	−2.19
AB	Edmonton Griesbach	Con	Gain	45.45	9.14	NDP	Con	−7.68
AB	Edmonton Manning	Con	Hold	53.09	11.97	NDP	Con	16.54
AB	Edmonton Northwest	Con	Hold	53.44	10.35	NDP	Con	15.69
AB	Edmonton Riverbend	Con	Hold	50.24	4.81	Con	Lib	−7.55
AB	Edmonton Southeast	Con	Hold	52.88	15.19	Lib	Con	5.21
AB	Edmonton Strathcona	NDP	Hold	46.96	−11.00	NDP	Con	−8.67
AB	Edmonton West	Con	Hold	52.87	7.25	NDP	Con	13.20
AB	Foothills	Con	Hold	76.33	7.91	NDP	Con	8.31
AB	Fort McMurray—Cold Lake	Con	Hold	80.15	12.34	PPC	Con	11.62
AB	Grande Prairie	Con	Hold	81.67	12.71	NDP	Con	10.19
AB	Lakeland	Con	Hold	80.97	11.57	PPC	Con	10.45
AB	Leduc—Wetaskiwin	Con	Hold	74.73	11.36	NDP	Con	11.42
AB	Lethbridge	Con	Hold	61.05	5.40	NDP	Con	10.54
AB	Medicine Hat—Cardston—Warner	Con	Hold	76.74	10.95	NDP	Con	10.03
AB	Parkland	Con	Hold	75.19	12.10	NDP	Con	12.12
AB	Peace River—Westlock	Con	Hold	77.07	14.41	NDP	Con	11.06
AB	Ponoka—Didsbury	Con	Hold	81.81	13.94	PPC	Con	12.71
AB	Red Deer	Con	Hold	71.55	11.04	NDP	Con	12.28
AB	Sherwood Park—Fort Saskatchewan	Con	Hold	66.32	8.76	NDP	Con	12.17
AB	St. Albert—Sturgeon River	Con	Hold	63.95	7.92	NDP	Con	13.34
AB	Yellowhead	Con	Hold	69.08	8.84	NDP	Con	9.77
BC	Abbotsford—South Langley	Con	Hold	43.09	−2.50	Con	Lib	−5.17
BC	Burnaby Central	Lib	Gain	42.23	10.98	NDP	Lib	−16.30
BC	Burnaby North—Seymour	Lib	Hold	59.05	18.17	Con	Lib	5.40
BC	Cariboo—Prince George	Con	Hold	60.32	9.15	NDP	Con	11.69
BC	Chilliwack—Hope	Con	Hold	54.79	8.80	NDP	Con	13.97
BC	Cloverdale—Langley City	Con	Gain	47.80	11.68	Lib	Con	−2.22
BC	Columbia—Kootenay—Southern Rockies	Con	Hold	50.43	6.81	NDP	Con	12.73
BC	Coquitlam—Port Coquitlam	Lib	Hold	47.37	9.45	Lib	Con	−1.71
BC	Courtenay—Alberni	NDP	Hold	39.64	−3.24	NDP	Con	−3.54
BC	Cowichan—Malahat—Langford	Con	Gain	37.24	8.89	NDP	Con	−9.54
BC	Delta	Lib	Hold	51.83	9.28	Lib	Con	−0.17
BC	Esquimalt—Saanich—Sooke	Lib	Gain	49.34	27.46	NDP	Lib	−26.03
BC	Fleetwood—Port Kells	Lib	Hold	47.91	1.97	Lib	Con	−6.84
BC	Kamloops—Shuswap—Central Rockies	Con	Hold	52.25	7.23	NDP	Con	13.39
BC	Kamloops—Thompson—Nicola	Con	Hold	51.54	8.04	NDP	Con	15.33
BC	Kelowna	Lib	Gain	48.78	22.54	Con	Lib	−8.95
BC	Langley Township—Fraser Heights	Con	Hold	51.37	7.45	Con	Lib	−2.93
BC	Mission—Matsqui—Abbotsford	Con	Hold	56.70	9.58	Con	Lib	−1.42
BC	Nanaimo—Ladysmith	Con	Gain	35.46	8.88	NDP	Con	−10.00
BC	New Westminster—Burnaby—Maillardville	Lib	Gain	35.09	11.65	NDP	Lib	−14.04
BC	North Island—Powell River	Con	Gain	38.75	2.53	NDP	Con	−4.71
BC	North Vancouver—Capilano	Lib	Hold	59.82	15.13	Con	Lib	5.42
BC	Okanagan Lake West—South Kelowna	Con	Hold	50.92	2.57	Con	Lib	−9.20
BC	Pitt Meadows—Maple Ridge	Con	Hold	47.41	10.27	NDP	Con	17.70
BC	Port Moody—Coquitlam	Lib	Gain	43.53	14.05	NDP	Con	−14.21
BC	Prince George—Peace River—Northern Rockies	Con	Hold	71.12	11.79	NDP	Con	10.08
BC	Richmond Centre—Marpole	Con	Gain	49.56	14.10	Lib	Con	−3.98
BC	Richmond East—Steveston	Lib	Hold	48.45	6.54	Lib	Con	−2.92
BC	Saanich—Gulf Islands	Green	Hold	39.10	3.34	Con	Green	0.45
BC	Similkameen—South Okanagan—West Kootenay	Con	Gain	44.06	6.48	NDP	Con	−14.64
BC	Skeena—Bulkley Valley	Con	Gain	47.19	11.05	NDP	Con	−7.14
BC	South Surrey—White Rock	Lib	Gain	50.50	11.60	Con	Lib	−4.19
BC	Surrey Centre	Lib	Hold	48.01	3.37	NDP	Lib	12.08
BC	Surrey Newton	Lib	Hold	49.45	−4.98	NDP	Lib	7.54
BC	Vancouver Centre	Lib	Hold	55.22	14.55	NDP	Lib	16.15
BC	Vancouver East	NDP	Hold	43.65	−12.75	NDP	Lib	−14.25
BC	Vancouver Fraserview—South Burnaby	Lib	Hold	52.30	9.99	NDP	Lib	15.63
BC	Vancouver Granville	Lib	Hold	62.12	24.89	NDP	Lib	25.14
BC	Vancouver Kingsway	NDP	Hold	37.24	−13.16	NDP	Lib	−10.39
BC	Vancouver Quadra	Lib	Hold	63.19	19.80	Con	Lib	9.32
BC	Vernon—Lake Country—Monashee	Con	Hold	50.42	6.59	NDP	Con	11.61
BC	Victoria	Lib	Gain	54.28	27.02	NDP	Lib	−23.00
BC	West Vancouver—Sunshine Coast—Sea to Sky Country	Lib	Hold	59.74	26.70	Con	Lib	11.43
Terr.	Yukon	Lib	Hold	53.05	19.71	Con	Lib	3.72
Terr.	Northwest Territories	Lib	Hold	53.51	15.29	NDP	Lib	17.74
Terr.	Nunavut	NDP	Hold	37.26	−10.41	NDP	Lib	−5.64

== Analysis of changes of vote share by party in each riding ==
N/A = No party presence in either 2021 or 2025

Share change analysis by party and riding (2025 vs 2021) - Quebec ridings
Province	Riding	Liberal		Conservative		BQ		NDP		Green		PPC	
Province	Riding	%	Change (pp)	%	Change (pp)	%	Change (pp)	%	Change (pp)	%	Change (pp)	%	Change (pp)
QC	Abitibi—Baie-James—Nunavik—Eeyou	41.16	15.19	22.41	6.56	33.97	-3.96	2.46	-9.23	–	-1.55	–	-3.77
QC	Abitibi—Témiscamingue	27.04	2.93	19.68	7.99	49.43	-1.17	2.95	-3.16	–	-1.64	–	-3.37
QC	Ahuntsic-Cartierville	60.96	9.05	15.03	6.86	16.88	-5.74	6.59	-5.13	–	-2.99	–	-2.59
QC	Alfred-Pellan	54.59	6.87	21.00	7.73	20.32	-6.26	3.39	-4.44	–	-1.66	0.70	0.36
QC	Argenteuil—La Petite-Nation	47.48	8.32	24.81	11.33	22.83	-9.98	2.53	-4.60	1.36	0.98	0.99	-4.78
QC	Beauce	19.14	6.83	59.71	11.42	13.65	-1.52	1.75	-1.16	–	-0.85	5.76	-12.43
QC	Beauharnois—Salaberry—Soulanges—Huntingdon	32.11	4.81	19.37	7.52	43.92	-4.40	2.43	-4.99	1.17	0.98	0.99	-2.32
QC	Beauport—Limoilou	35.59	10.95	30.11	-0.43	28.59	-2.47	3.41	-6.30	1.50	-0.53	0.64	0.31
QC	Bécancour—Nicolet—Saurel—Alnôbak	27.27	10.37	21.57	4.77	46.96	-7.84	2.05	-3.05	1.36	-0.18	0.80	-1.63
QC	Bellechasse—Les Etchemins—Lévis	28.51	12.96	49.08	-2.92	18.72	-4.04	2.48	-2.44	–	-1.44	1.21	1.21
QC	Beloeil—Chambly	34.00	10.56	13.52	5.13	48.26	-5.27	3.51	-5.00	–	-2.00	0.71	-1.31
QC	Berthier—Maskinongé	24.30	8.90	17.18	6.26	34.99	-0.95	21.72	-10.97	0.89	-0.08	0.93	-1.71
QC	Bourassa	58.55	-1.83	16.31	9.31	17.14	-1.56	5.90	-2.10	–	-1.84	1.20	-2.46
QC	Brome—Missisquoi	48.26	13.31	19.10	2.90	28.05	-6.59	2.22	-4.00	1.58	-0.80	0.78	-2.44
QC	Brossard—Saint-Lambert	62.21	8.11	18.86	6.87	13.34	-6.600	3.49	-6.91	1.46	1.46	0.65	-1.81
QC	Charlesbourg—Haute-Saint-Charles	34.62	14.97	42.44	-2.59	18.92	-5.72	2.68	-3.23	–	-1.67	0.79	-1.41
QC	Châteauguay—Les Jardins-de-Napierville	45.16	8.65	21.66	9.50	29.06	-7.54	2.20	-5.61	1.24	-0.25	0.69	-3.09
QC	Chicoutimi—Le Fjord	31.12	12.90	34.14	-6.24	31.19	-2.88	1.95	-2.75	0.94	-0.24	0.67	-0.70
QC	Compton—Stanstead	45.64	8.98	21.78	4.37	26.37	-4.14	3.24	-4.30	1.77	-1.04	1.20	-2.56
QC	Côte-du-Sud—Rivière-du-Loup—Kataskomiq—Témiscouata	30.32	11.26	45.84	0.95	20.00	-9.81	1.70	-1.68	1.08	1.08	0.74	0.38
QC	Côte-Nord—Kawawachikamach—Nitassinan	27.39	8.69	25.19	3.36	43.68	-8.94	1.72	-2.59	N/A		N/A	
QC	Dorval—Lachine—LaSalle	59.36	7.12	20.68	8.76	12.57	-3.15	4.17	-8.93	1.63	-1.20	0.95	-3.24
QC	Drummond	28.45	9.67	22.74	4.81	42.80	-3.82	4.64	-6.52	N/A		1.37	1.37
QC	Gaspésie—Les Îles-de-la-Madeleine—Listuguj	38.29	-1.47	12.37	4.11	45.79	1.45	1.76	-2.51	N/A		0.79	-1.21
QC	Gatineau	60.54	10.49	19.13	8.02	16.33	-7.09	2.81	-5.81	–	-1.56	0.88	-3.18
QC	Hochelaga—Rosemont-Est	46.14	7.71	10.56	5.86	27.18	-4.24	13.04	-7.24	2.60	0.60	–	-2.27
QC	Honoré-Mercier	60.16	0.16	21.48	10.94	12.93	-3.35	3.59	-3.73	1.14	-0.36	0.71	-3.48
QC	Hull—Aylmer	62.11	9.65	16.95	6.17	12.14	-3.97	5.55	-7.19	2.19	-0.63	0.66	-2.99
QC	Joliette—Manawan	31.26	8.98	15.24	5.76	49.27	-5.87	2.46	-3.33	1.77	-0.18	–	-3.02
QC	Jonquière	26.02	5.22	30.25	1.94	39.99	-3.12	1.84	-3.53	0.88	-0.81	1.02	1.02
QC	La Pointe-de-l'Île	37.68	5.37	12.74	6.04	43.11	-3.55	4.28	-5.42	1.84	1.84	–	-2.74
QC	La Prairie—Atateken	44.06	9.45	17.23	7.29	34.80	-8.93	2.38	-4.92	0.98	-0.68	0.54	-2.05
QC	Lac-Saint-Jean	26.25	7.28	24.69	-0.57	46.21	-4.69	1.71	-1.55	–	-1.60	1.13	1.13
QC	Lac-Saint-Louis	67.63	11.37	23.67	4.76	3.63	-1.71	2.92	-10.38	1.42	-1.81	0.73	-2.23
QC	LaSalle—Émard—Verdun	50.86	7.44	13.82	6.19	21.25	-0.57	10.36	-8.66	2.41	-0.60	0.48	-2.93
QC	Laurentides—Labelle	34.94	11.48	14.91	4.41	44.57	-7.74	2.53	-3.03	1.63	-0.79	1.41	-2.22
QC	Laurier—Sainte-Marie	52.07	12.57	9.15	4.66	15.42	-4.72	18.81	-11.62	2.77	0.54	0.48	-1.28
QC	Laval—Les Îles	49.73	0.79	32.25	14.53	14.58	-4.50	3.45	-4.24	–	-1.50	–	-5.08
QC	Les Pays-d'en-Haut	41.04	15.15	17.98	6.32	36.15	-11.40	2.27	-4.61	1.58	0.05	0.97	-3.35
QC	Lévis—Lotbinière	29.43	14.06	47.71	-1.99	19.52	-3.30	2.34	-4.94	–	-1.35	1.00	-1.38
QC	Longueuil—Charles-LeMoyne	49.39	8.95	16.79	8.48	26.69	-8.60	5.56	-4.77	–	-2.44	0.81	-2.13
QC	Longueuil—Saint-Hubert	40.98	2.67	14.28	7.36	39.68	-1.51	5.05	-2.91	–	-2.79	–	-2.37
QC	Louis-Hébert	55.44	17.23	20.12	-4.18	21.34	-5.67	2.55	-4.68	–	-2.60	0.55	0.55
QC	Louis-Saint-Laurent—Akiawenhrahk	32.96	15.62	44.86	-7.17	18.94	-1.19	2.44	-2.83	–	-1.42	0.80	-1.33
QC	Marc-Aurèle-Fortin	51.99	7.88	20.71	8.97	23.60	-7.20	3.70	-4.86	N/A		–	-2.89
QC	Mégantic—L'Érable—Lotbinière	21.48	7.98	58.79	2.08	16.38	-3.22	1.82	-1.30	–	-1.31	1.22	-2.30
QC	Mirabel	33.35	8.96	22.26	8.95	39.91	-5.91	2.37	-6.25	1.41	-0.76	0.71	-3.09
QC	Mount Royal	51.06	-6.35	40.47	16.40	3.34	-0.73	4.70	-4.13	–	-2.73	–	-2.65
QC	Mont-Saint-Bruno—L'Acadie	47.10	12.99	13.68	3.98	35.09	-10.40	2.33	-5.99	1.22	1.07	0.58	-1.53
QC	Montcalm	26.95	6.97	23.22	11.55	46.60	-6.62	3.23	-3.04	–	-2.55	–	-4.28
QC	Montmorency—Charlevoix	28.79	8.58	34.50	0.62	33.62	-3.08	1.52	-3.11	0.98	-0.22	0.60	-1.28
QC	Notre-Dame-de-Grâce—Westmount	63.99	11.15	19.66	6.21	4.96	-1.02	7.40	-12.68	2.49	-1.51	0.48	-2.77
QC	Outremont	55.20	10.84	12.54	5.23	11.97	-3.47	10.66	-16.64	9.63	6.51	–	-2.13
QC	Papineau	52.98	2.68	10.57	5.73	16.57	1.54	16.32	-6.37	–	-3.19	0.98	-1.37
QC	Pierre-Boucher—Les Patriotes—Verchères	38.79	12.94	11.81	3.00	46.08	-8.18	2.47	-5.24	N/A		0.85	-1.11
QC	Pierrefonds—Dollard	60.08	4.07	30.55	9.72	5.42	-2.50	2.82	-8.71	N/A		0.58	-3.13
QC	Pontiac—Kitigan Zibi	54.60	10.74	27.60	6.20	10.33	-4.84	5.06	-6.29	1.27	-1.63	1.15	-3.33
QC	Portneuf—Jacques-Cartier	29.05	13.90	49.56	-2.79	17.87	-5.87	1.59	-3.13	1.12	1.12	0.81	-1.64
QC	Québec Centre	49.50	13.78	–	-18.02	35.87	6.84	7.81	-4.89	–	-2.36	5.00	3.43
QC	Repentigny	38.75	10.61	15.21	6.37	42.20	-9.16	2.73	-4.73	N/A		0.61	0.61
QC	Richmond—Arthabaska	32.98	18.04	35.50	-14.38	27.33	2.58	2.00	-2.47	N/A		1.13	-2.47
QC	Rimouski—La Matapédia	35.53	13.45	13.55	2.36	46.16	-8.13	1.80	-4.06	N/A		0.63	-1.43
QC	Rivière-des-Mille-Îles	45.63	10.27	17.36	7.11	32.84	-7.70	2.12	-5.08	1.23	-0.59	0.51	-2.24
QC	Rivière-du-Nord	31.62	9.15	21.03	9.00	43.85	-7.76	3.50	-3.38	–	-0.29	–	-3.83
QC	Rosemont—La Petite-Patrie	31.57	8.40	6.85	2.86	18.28	-3.09	40.99	-7.58	2.30	-0.08	N/A	
QC	Saint-Hyacinthe—Bagot—Acton	33.64	10.95	17.99	4.48	43.88	-3.57	2.37	-9.27	1.38	1.38	0.74	-1.98
QC	Saint-Jean	34.26	6.14	16.32	3.58	44.34	-1.67	2.57	-4.71	1.54	-0.59	0.97	0.97
QC	Saint-Laurent	58.89	-0.45	28.24	9.92	5.71	-2.24	4.49	-6.27	1.57	1.46	0.79	-2.36
QC	Saint-Léonard—Saint-Michel	65.34	-4.26	20.59	10.13	7.15	-0.83	5.97	-2.23	N/A		0.94	-2.81
QC	Saint-Maurice—Champlain	49.96	7.51	24.62	6.62	21.19	-8.88	1.97	-3.09	1.13	-0.17	0.73	0.73
QC	Shefford	39.25	5.76	17.12	4.98	40.11	-1.81	2.34	-2.98	–	-1.78	1.18	-2.29
QC	Sherbrooke	51.29	13.75	13.10	0.27	26.63	-2.38	5.77	-8.16	2.27	-0.60	0.95	-1.52
QC	Terrebonne	38.74	9.37	18.18	7.73	38.74	-2.66	2.58	-4.07	1.05	-0.38	0.71	-1.97
QC	Thérèse-De Blainville	45.84	10.64	18.66	7.62	32.34	-8.59	2.46	-4.81	–	-1.93	0.69	-1.99
QC	Trois-Rivières	41.01	12.38	27.25	-2.10	27.60	-1.89	2.34	-5.71	0.93	-0.37	0.52	-1.40
QC	Vaudreuil	57.87	10.40	22.85	6.37	14.93	-6.03	2.26	-8.37	1.35	-1.18	0.74	0.74
QC	Ville-Marie—Le Sud-Ouest—Île-des-Sœurs	63.70	12.33	18.78	5.96	8.99	-2.95	6.04	-12.04	2.05	-0.62	–	-2.61
QC	Vimy	53.41	3.27	24.72	10.87	17.16	-5.18	4.71	-4.61	N/A		–	-4.34

Share change analysis by party and riding (2025 vs 2021) - ridings in rest of Canada
Province	Riding	Liberal		Conservative		NDP		Green		PPC	
Province	Riding	%	Change (pp)	%	Change (pp)	%	Change (pp)	%	Change (pp)	%	Change (pp)
NL	Avalon	58.61	7.73	36.05	3.00	4.86	-9.40	N/A		–	-1.83
NL	Cape Spear	68.25	13.53	25.75	5.38	5.32	-17.81	0.30	0.30	–	-1.77
NL	Central Newfoundland	43.55	-2.46	54.08	7.19	2.37	-4.73	N/A		N/A	
NL	Labrador	51.50	8.83	41.73	11.38	6.77	-17.03	N/A		–	-3.18
NL	Long Range Mountains	42.75	-1.64	50.35	10.99	4.36	-7.57	N/A		1.16	-3.17
NL	St. John's East	62.28	17.14	25.93	7.84	11.23	-23.61	0.35	0.35	–	-1.94
NL	Terra Nova—The Peninsulas	47.93	0.67	47.96	7.51	4.10	-4.22	N/A		–	-3.96
PE	Cardigan	57.02	6.46	37.38	6.47	2.00	-7.77	1.29	-3.52	0.71	-2.57
PE	Charlottetown	64.75	18.06	29.11	-1.95	4.30	-6.43	1.22	-8.37	0.62	-1.31
PE	Egmont	51.92	5.98	43.40	12.36	2.44	-6.21	2.24	-7.17	–	-4.96
PE	Malpeque	57.60	15.58	36.63	3.49	1.38	-6.65	3.90	-10.12	0.49	-2.30
NS	Acadie—Annapolis	46.57	15.88	47.67	-3.64	3.66	-9.03	1.21	1.21	0.89	-4.41
NS	Cape Breton—Canso—Antigonish	51.59	6.16	43.23	8.12	4.00	-10.75	–	-0.49	0.69	-3.26
NS	Central Nova	51.93	7.63	42.75	9.90	3.28	-12.86	0.91	-0.62	0.66	-3.33
NS	Cumberland—Colchester	48.31	14.11	45.83	-0.19	3.78	-8.55	1.40	-1.18	0.67	-3.50
NS	Dartmouth—Cole Harbour	67.69	16.19	22.73	19.86	7.04	-25.92	1.05	-1.85	1.26	-8.49
NS	Halifax	63.05	20.81	19.05	6.31	16.57	-23.72	0.81	-1.40	0.52	-1.59
NS	Halifax West	65.60	18.04	27.22	5.67	5.59	-20.41	0.90	-1.55	0.70	-1.61
NS	Kings—Hants	60.56	16.16	33.41	3.17	3.64	-15.26	1.39	-0.54	1.00	-3.53
NS	Sackville—Bedford—Preston	61.97	17.32	32.41	7.42	3.99	-20.78	0.90	-1.15	0.72	-2.77
NS	South Shore—St. Margarets	54.88	19.30	41.14	-2.25	–	-18.20	1.61	-1.22	1.38	1.38
NS	Sydney—Glace Bay	54.63	12.70	38.12	3.94	3.79	-15.97	–	-0.64	1.25	-2.02
NB	Acadie—Bathurst	67.48	2.51	25.99	12.14	4.37	-6.88	–	-2.82	2.16	-3.71
NB	Beauséjour	60.60	5.07	33.31	13.89	2.43	-8.55	2.16	-3.53	0.84	-6.74
NB	Fredericton—Oromocto	61.29	23.51	32.29	-2.22	1.81	-11.19	3.13	-9.76	0.41	0.07
NB	Fundy Royal	40.12	14.54	53.37	7.04	3.17	-11.34	2.02	-2.98	1.32	-7.26
NB	Madawaska—Restigouche	55.18	3.19	39.63	11.87	3.04	-3.13	–	-2.72	2.15	-5.39
NB	Miramichi—Grand Lake	47.15	10.15	48.15	2.69	2.53	-4.86	2.17	-2.51	–	-5.38
NB	Moncton—Dieppe	63.00	12.97	31.22	8.63	3.70	-13.10	2.07	-2.19	–	-6.30
NB	Saint John—Kennebecasis	58.11	15.51	37.33	0.94	2.68	-10.50	1.64	-1.29	–	-4.90
NB	Saint John—St. Croix	41.49	13.42	53.08	6.09	3.28	-9.81	1.59	-2.46	–	-7.64
NB	Tobique—Mactaquac	35.86	13.21	58.79	5.97	2.05	-9.49	2.03	-2.87	1.26	-5.97
ON	Ajax	56.32	-0.51	39.08	12.48	2.68	-11.36	0.93	-1.59	N/A	
ON	Algonquin—Renfrew—Pembroke	37.81	18.44	55.71	6.20	3.68	-17.27	0.92	-0.98	–	-7.64
ON	Aurora—Oak Ridges—Richmond Hill	42.77	-1.99	54.73	12.60	1.34	-6.69	0.75	0.56	0.41	-3.46
ON	Barrie South—Innisfil	37.96	9.07	57.84	10.17	3.16	-12.61	N/A		1.03	-6.64
ON	Barrie—Springwater—Oro-Medonte	44.36	13.95	51.67	5.88	2.37	-14.25	1.36	1.15	–	-6.93
ON	Bay of Quinte	50.39	13.37	44.69	4.10	3.64	-11.61	1.28	-0.93	–	-4.93
ON	Beaches—East York	67.75	11.17	23.54	9.19	6.85	-15.67	1.27	-1.44	–	-3.16
ON	Bowmanville—Oshawa North	45.51	14.70	49.77	5.02	2.87	-15.51	0.77	0.77	–	-5.41
ON	Brampton Centre	48.37	0.05	46.87	15.45	2.66	-13.12	1.15	1.15	0.71	-2.89
ON	Brampton—Chinguacousy Park	48.85	-1.96	44.44	13.44	2.66	-14.16	1.18	1.18	1.68	1.68
ON	Brampton East	48.59	-4.61	44.71	16.15	1.69	-13.93	N/A		4.74	2.11
ON	Brampton North—Caledon	49.03	-2.41	47.44	14.25	2.16	-11.79	–	-0.40	1.36	0.41
ON	Brampton South	49.33	-4.55	47.51	18.06	1.74	-11.79	N/A		0.80	-2.07
ON	Brampton West	47.64	-8.65	49.81	22.08	1.67	-11.09	0.66	0.66	–	-2.47
ON	Brantford—Brant South—Six Nations	41.09	13.35	52.44	12.36	3.66	-16.63	1.69	-0.95	0.60	-8.18
ON	Bruce—Grey—Owen Sound	40.11	14.88	53.03	3.85	3.09	-10.50	2.16	-0.90	0.78	-7.26
ON	Burlington	55.80	10.07	40.56	3.31	1.98	-8.88	0.76	-1.22	0.67	-3.33
ON	Burlington North—Milton West	52.75	4.85	44.25	7.66	2.14	-7.46	–	-1.94	0.86	-3.10
ON	Cambridge	46.33	8.09	48.56	14.42	3.34	-13.75	1.61	-1.78	–	-7.15
ON	Carleton	50.95	19.09	45.70	-6.15	1.42	-9.95	0.65	-1.49	–	-2.75
ON	Chatham-Kent—Leamington	35.91	9.17	57.51	15.08	4.07	-10.54	1.05	-0.47	1.47	-13.24
ON	Davenport	57.81	14.21	23.19	12.34	17.09	-22.49	1.28	-1.12	–	-3.27
ON	Don Valley North	53.21	0.45	42.34	9.80	2.45	-7.47	0.92	-0.89	0.54	-2.41
ON	Don Valley West	62.63	5.41	33.21	3.30	2.36	-6.81	1.05	-0.01	–	-2.54
ON	Dufferin—Caledon	35.16	6.53	60.14	11.10	1.95	-8.42	1.31	-3.20	1.07	-6.05
ON	Eglinton—Lawrence	49.29	0.81	47.83	11.38	1.64	-7.52	0.71	-2.30	0.54	-2.38
ON	Elgin—St. Thomas—London South	43.13	23.47	50.14	0.89	4.80	-11.37	–	-2.21	1.93	-10.25
ON	Essex	36.65	21.20	57.52	16.56	4.77	-26.88	–	-1.23	1.05	-9.15
ON	Etobicoke Centre	53.60	5.46	44.01	9.92	2.39	-8.37	–	-0.32	–	-6.59
ON	Etobicoke—Lakeshore	57.41	10.28	38.80	6.33	2.55	-10.94	–	-2.12	0.94	-3.46
ON	Etobicoke North	52.58	-6.30	40.98	15.55	3.20	-7.35	0.93	0.93	2.00	-2.35
ON	Flamborough—Glanbrook—Brant North	43.23	10.69	52.70	8.92	2.44	-12.18	0.89	-1.55	0.75	-5.79
ON	Guelph	54.67	13.30	30.74	7.29	3.20	-18.82	10.18	2.33	0.75	-3.92
ON	Haldimand—Norfolk	36.37	8.85	57.56	10.17	3.37	-9.92	1.05	1.05	0.92	-9.58
ON	Haliburton—Kawartha Lakes	38.70	14.84	56.56	4.58	3.48	-10.76	–	-2.46	1.26	-5.58
ON	Hamilton Centre	37.55	10.82	29.99	13.47	29.11	-17.84	1.44	-1.22	1.04	-5.53
ON	Hamilton East—Stoney Creek	46.51	7.43	48.70	18.58	3.66	-18.02	–	-1.86	1.13	-6.13
ON	Hamilton Mountain	45.58	11.09	41.50	16.46	11.76	-19.80	–	-2.00	0.83	-5.49
ON	Hamilton West—Ancaster—Dundas	56.10	11.81	36.78	7.71	5.25	-14.46	1.19	-1.42	0.44	-3.66
ON	Hastings—Lennox and Addington—Tyendinaga	40.35	5.88	54.32	8.74	3.55	-7.49	1.21	-0.57	0.57	-5.11
ON	Humber River—Black Creek	55.62	-5.07	35.80	18.40	6.38	-10.02	–	-1.21	1.62	-2.29
ON	Huron—Bruce	41.54	15.37	53.16	2.22	3.30	-11.50	1.33	1.33	–	-7.25
ON	Kanata	60.76	17.60	35.67	-1.18	2.29	-12.41	1.12	-1.42	–	-2.76
ON	Kapuskasing—Timmins—Mushkegowuk	38.96	12.74	48.93	23.75	10.38	-25.41	–	-0.40	1.73	-10.54
ON	Kenora—Kiiwetinoong	35.16	15.31	48.75	5.43	13.75	-15.39	1.06	-0.33	0.76	-5.55
ON	Kingston and the Islands	63.23	22.54	30.64	6.09	4.74	-24.06	1.39	-1.07	–	-3.49
ON	King—Vaughan	35.95	-6.95	61.53	16.67	1.14	-5.49	0.85	-0.42	0.54	-3.81
ON	Kitchener Centre	29.27	11.91	34.25	9.40	1.96	-15.54	33.61	0.24	0.57	-6.08
ON	Kitchener—Conestoga	48.32	10.03	47.48	9.84	2.93	-8.99	–	-4.91	1.27	-5.96
ON	Kitchener South—Hespeler	46.24	8.79	47.94	12.40	3.02	-13.25	2.00	-1.44	0.64	-6.11
ON	Lanark—Frontenac	45.57	19.74	50.41	0.72	2.93	-12.32	1.09	-1.59	–	-6.21
ON	Leeds—Grenville—Thousand Islands—Rideau Lakes	44.39	19.19	50.05	-0.48	3.50	-11.45	1.17	-2.43	0.89	-4.83
ON	London Centre	56.74	19.19	31.09	6.29	9.66	-20.72	1.47	-0.50	0.87	-4.28
ON	London—Fanshawe	30.52	7.48	40.58	16.31	27.57	-15.93	N/A		1.33	-7.85
ON	London West	56.22	19.35	37.00	2.85	5.51	-17.37	0.68	0.68	–	-4.99
ON	Markham—Stouffville	51.36	-0.19	45.26	10.50	1.82	-6.97	0.70	-1.27	0.64	-2.30
ON	Markham—Thornhill	54.54	-7.00	41.65	15.26	2.03	-6.33	–	-2.00	1.48	-0.24
ON	Markham—Unionville	47.05	-1.18	50.65	8.22	1.35	-5.20	0.94	-1.85	N/A	
ON	Middlesex—London	42.09	14.94	51.67	6.42	4.13	-13.71	1.00	-0.81	0.83	-6.94
ON	Milton East—Halton Hills South	48.25	6.54	48.22	6.98	1.54	-8.03	1.01	-1.59	0.71	-4.16
ON	Mississauga Centre	53.85	-0.03	41.85	13.00	2.73	-8.58	–	-1.62	1.10	-3.10
ON	Mississauga East—Cooksville	50.20	-0.07	44.61	13.00	2.79	-7.71	–	-0.32	1.78	-4.67
ON	Mississauga—Erin Mills	55.71	4.52	39.97	6.46	2.18	-8.12	0.61	-1.02	1.22	-2.14
ON	Mississauga—Lakeshore	52.35	7.35	44.04	5.46	1.88	-7.89	0.88	-1.33	0.50	-3.76
ON	Mississauga—Malton	53.30	0.62	42.18	11.39	2.57	-11.18	–	-1.86	1.96	1.66
ON	Mississauga—Streetsville	51.53	4.19	44.86	10.54	2.29	-9.81	0.72	-1.40	0.60	-3.13
ON	Nepean	63.78	18.04	33.25	-0.12	1.97	-14.25	0.64	-1.30	0.36	-2.37
ON	Newmarket—Aurora	47.02	3.24	50.62	12.46	2.36	-9.19	–	-1.84	–	-4.19
ON	New Tecumseth—Gwillimbury	36.97	6.70	59.35	11.68	1.85	-11.20	1.08	-0.16	0.75	-6.74
ON	Niagara Falls—Niagara-on-the-Lake	44.89	9.69	49.14	11.71	3.85	-14.00	0.85	-1.09	0.79	-6.79
ON	Niagara South	43.91	10.96	47.81	14.40	5.61	-17.18	0.89	-1.01	1.49	-7.45
ON	Niagara West	43.21	12.16	51.72	7.69	3.21	-10.76	–	-2.80	0.83	-6.27
ON	Nipissing—Timiskaming	47.24	10.38	44.59	12.71	6.06	-17.28	1.00	1.00	1.11	-6.82
ON	Northumberland—Clarke	45.86	11.84	48.97	4.98	2.94	-11.01	0.88	-1.68	0.73	-4.74
ON	Oakville East	51.14	4.92	44.85	5.42	2.79	-6.61	0.58	-1.06	0.55	-2.76
ON	Oakville West	53.08	5.59	44.41	5.95	1.38	-7.32	0.60	-1.11	0.42	-3.20
ON	Orléans	67.44	15.10	28.01	-0.66	2.62	-11.83	0.83	-0.79	0.42	-2.22
ON	Oshawa	42.96	19.84	48.17	8.46	7.66	-20.83	1.21	-0.33	–	-7.14
ON	Ottawa Centre	62.73	17.50	15.60	-0.68	19.59	-13.12	1.13	-1.67	–	-2.24
ON	Ottawa South	65.18	15.77	27.06	0.09	6.03	-12.09	0.96	-1.23	–	-3.09
ON	Ottawa—Vanier—Gloucester	67.37	18.37	21.46	0.93	7.57	-15.69	1.97	-1.07	0.51	-2.68
ON	Ottawa West—Nepean	63.64	18.22	27.05	-0.61	7.08	-13.13	1.14	-1.75	0.75	-2.45
ON	Oxford	38.17	17.50	53.38	6.59	4.26	-14.18	1.25	-1.45	0.90	-9.74
ON	Parry Sound—Muskoka	42.63	20.99	52.19	4.26	3.56	-13.27	–	-5.58	1.62	-5.92
ON	Perth—Wellington	40.79	16.17	53.01	4.45	4.54	-12.65	N/A		1.67	-7.97
ON	Peterborough	54.25	19.43	41.04	1.85	3.04	-16.12	0.83	-1.40	0.34	-3.97
ON	Pickering—Brooklin	54.16	6.00	41.16	6.90	2.58	-10.90	0.75	0.50	0.90	-2.95
ON	Prescott—Russell—Cumberland	54.78	7.56	40.35	7.94	2.42	-8.37	1.10	-0.93	1.02	-5.41
ON	Richmond Hill South	44.40	-3.43	52.26	13.50	1.80	-6.95	0.84	0.84	0.42	-2.54
ON	Sarnia—Lambton—Bkejwanong	37.89	18.50	53.15	6.64	5.35	-15.64	–	-1.49	1.49	-9.51
ON	Sault Ste. Marie—Algoma	47.36	15.00	44.72	9.12	6.62	-19.27	0.83	0.20	–	-5.24
ON	Scarborough—Agincourt	54.31	-1.93	42.84	13.67	2.86	-7.22	–	-1.72	–	-2.79
ON	Scarborough Centre—Don Valley East	57.31	0.99	38.07	12.75	3.25	-10.49	N/A		1.37	-2.89
ON	Scarborough—Guildwood—Rouge Park	63.96	2.67	31.68	9.62	3.21	-10.17	1.15	1.15	–	-3.01
ON	Scarborough North	62.95	-4.03	33.14	15.05	3.91	-7.68	N/A		–	-2.43
ON	Scarborough Southwest	61.49	3.53	30.57	9.98	5.01	-10.97	1.38	-0.87	1.04	-1.84
ON	Scarborough—Woburn	60.38	-0.03	34.13	11.59	3.50	-9.66	1.19	1.19	–	-3.08
ON	Simcoe—Grey	43.38	15.49	52.08	4.65	2.32	-10.86	1.46	-2.69	0.77	-6.17
ON	Simcoe North	44.69	13.86	48.41	6.23	3.77	-12.19	1.89	-1.16	0.96	-6.69
ON	Spadina—Harbourfront	60.07	21.84	30.73	9.03	7.75	-26.09	0.85	-2.37	0.36	-2.65
ON	St. Catharines	52.01	14.15	40.43	8.06	6.02	-15.29	–	-1.87	0.78	-5.81
ON	Stormont—Dundas—Glengarry	39.77	15.06	56.32	1.99	2.49	-8.41	1.01	-1.30	–	-7.67
ON	Sudbury	51.86	16.88	39.18	11.36	7.69	-21.21	–	-1.98	1.27	-4.85
ON	Sudbury East—Manitoulin—Nickel Belt	41.57	9.58	48.33	21.43	7.99	-22.34	0.77	-0.96	0.81	-8.09
ON	Taiaiako’n—Parkdale—High Park	55.79	13.00	19.39	6.05	22.97	-15.43	1.07	-0.82	–	-3.20
ON	Thornhill	31.19	-4.87	66.38	14.66	1.24	-4.73	0.53	-1.12	0.66	-3.94
ON	Thunder Bay—Rainy River	48.53	14.27	42.92	13.64	6.79	-21.67	0.77	-0.67	0.99	-5.58
ON	Thunder Bay—Superior North	55.22	14.82	35.74	11.79	7.11	-20.60	0.92	-0.85	1.01	-4.89
ON	Toronto Centre	64.33	14.50	20.91	7.98	12.49	-13.76	1.13	-6.92	0.40	-1.95
ON	Toronto—Danforth	66.56	18.20	19.00	6.44	12.95	-20.72	1.06	-0.90	–	-2.46
ON	Toronto—St. Paul's	61.91	12.40	33.11	6.60	3.49	-12.41	0.77	-4.79	0.46	-2.04
ON	University—Rosedale	64.00	17.51	23.49	5.54	9.91	-18.17	1.71	-2.73	–	-2.59
ON	Vaughan—Woodbridge	38.03	-8.11	60.01	19.75	1.32	-5.60	–	-0.96	0.63	-4.76
ON	Waterloo	59.47	13.99	32.55	5.11	4.14	-14.98	2.53	-0.88	0.55	-4.00
ON	Wellington—Halton Hills North	44.43	14.17	50.62	3.84	2.02	-9.94	2.08	-2.62	0.85	-5.34
ON	Whitby	52.70	7.61	43.82	9.34	2.42	-11.99	0.75	-0.86	–	-4.40
ON	Willowdale	53.45	2.25	43.99	10.13	2.57	-7.73	–	-1.98	–	-2.68
ON	Windsor—Tecumseh—Lakeshore	45.75	14.87	45.75	18.72	6.05	-24.25	0.67	-0.54	1.18	-9.11
ON	Windsor West	30.95	3.17	39.01	19.67	27.79	-16.44	0.72	0.72	1.01	-7.33
ON	York Centre	42.67	-4.62	54.83	16.99	2.50	-7.68	N/A		–	-4.68
ON	York—Durham	39.58	11.07	55.56	3.81	2.52	-10.05	1.10	0.54	1.24	-5.13
ON	York South—Weston—Etobicoke	55.30	-0.28	39.79	17.31	4.91	-10.18	–	-1.91	–	-4.94
MB	Brandon—Souris	23.39	11.45	62.19	2.82	14.42	-5.97	–	-0.02	–	-8.22
MB	Churchill—Keewatinook Aski	45.50	20.32	24.07	-0.10	28.73	-13.84	–	-3.08	1.71	-3.31
MB	Elmwood—Transcona	22.45	7.57	41.56	13.11	34.46	-14.66	0.69	-0.90	0.85	-5.11
MB	Kildonan—St. Paul	44.68	16.78	47.48	5.04	6.96	-16.84	–	-0.31	0.88	-4.55
MB	Portage—Lisgar	22.83	11.86	69.38	17.23	4.38	-9.05	1.29	1.29	2.13	-19.76
MB	Provencher	25.86	9.35	66.34	18.00	4.63	-7.59	1.36	-1.20	1.82	-15.67
MB	Riding Mountain	22.16	9.42	67.85	8.66	7.34	-7.18	1.31	-0.80	1.35	-9.20
MB	St. Boniface—St. Vital	59.79	15.89	32.33	4.04	6.92	-14.25	–	-1.50	0.96	-3.36
MB	Selkirk—Interlake—Eastman	30.42	17.17	60.18	3.21	6.49	-12.94	1.30	-1.39	0.87	-6.80
MB	Winnipeg Centre	35.40	6.45	22.33	9.53	39.44	-10.21	1.13	-1.25	1.07	-3.21
MB	Winnipeg North	57.92	4.71	34.35	20.87	6.03	-21.72	0.57	-0.66	0.80	-3.24
MB	Winnipeg South	59.02	10.87	35.09	2.39	4.56	-9.77	0.50	-0.98	0.83	-2.51
MB	Winnipeg South Centre	63.62	18.34	27.73	-0.38	6.51	-14.16	0.85	-1.81	0.51	-2.30
MB	Winnipeg West	54.46	15.22	40.76	0.41	3.99	-10.92	0.79	-1.27	–	-3.42
SK	Battlefords—Lloydminster—Meadow Lake	18.72	11.40	75.78	8.52	4.81	-8.10	–	-0.78	–	-5.99
SK	Carlton Trail—Eagle Creek	17.02	11.55	77.42	9.42	5.56	-8.48	–	-0.93	–	-9.26
SK	Desnethé—Missinippi—Churchill River	65.09	18.75	25.49	1.92	9.42	-14.60	–	-1.17	–	-3.13
SK	Moose Jaw—Lake Centre—Lanigan	16.70	10.67	71.91	10.92	7.54	-11.39	0.90	-0.13	2.96	-8.36
SK	Prince Albert	19.18	7.37	71.47	7.38	9.35	-5.67	–	-1.10	–	-6.88
SK	Regina—Lewvan	42.97	28.67	50.01	3.85	5.85	-28.96	0.62	-0.62	0.55	-2.94
SK	Regina—Qu'Appelle	26.96	16.73	63.97	3.70	8.02	-14.65	–	-1.89	1.04	-3.89
SK	Regina—Wascana	43.68	16.76	50.08	0.18	4.85	-13.22	0.66	-0.96	0.74	-2.76
SK	Saskatoon South	40.41	26.04	49.27	0.02	9.07	-21.55	0.62	-0.61	0.62	-3.90
SK	Saskatoon—University	41.37	30.52	48.87	0.95	8.51	-26.89	0.55	-0.40	0.69	-3.49
SK	Saskatoon West	27.25	19.06	52.65	7.29	19.10	-20.20	1.00	-0.05	–	-6.09
SK	Souris—Moose Mountain	9.78	5.58	83.98	7.97	4.56	-3.49	0.57	0.51	–	-9.17
SK	Swift Current—Grasslands—Kindersley	11.22	7.11	81.98	9.53	5.71	-4.56	–	-0.84	–	-7.58
SK	Yorkton—Melville	14.42	8.11	77.55	8.75	5.50	-6.62	1.93	0.18	–	-9.21
AB	Airdrie—Cochrane	23.69	13.52	71.22	11.32	3.67	-11.25	–	-1.26	–	-8.23
AB	Battle River—Crowfoot	11.67	7.42	82.84	11.45	3.18	-6.52	0.73	-0.18	1.58	-7.75
AB	Bow River	16.91	9.04	78.87	9.31	2.99	-6.38	N/A		–	-9.85
AB	Calgary Centre	45.79	15.73	50.21	-0.71	2.65	-13.78	0.58	-1.05	0.58	0.58
AB	Calgary Confederation	48.10	20.21	46.25	0.56	4.13	-13.59	0.58	-3.10	0.44	-4.20
AB	Calgary Crowfoot	37.37	15.68	58.84	3.89	2.56	-13.62	0.51	-1.17	0.53	-4.10
AB	Calgary East	31.79	13.25	60.53	7.68	3.90	-14.18	1.24	-0.88	1.69	-5.47
AB	Calgary Heritage	34.56	18.37	61.45	3.12	2.47	-14.81	0.72	-0.70	–	-5.11
AB	Calgary McKnight	46.01	2.25	49.11	14.89	2.83	-13.35	0.64	-0.49	0.76	-3.18
AB	Calgary Midnapore	29.93	17.47	65.54	5.27	3.09	-15.44	0.67	-0.67	0.76	-5.33
AB	Calgary Nose Hill	36.17	15.94	59.42	4.10	3.21	-13.71	0.70	-0.92	–	-4.80
AB	Calgary Shepard	28.23	14.31	67.99	6.79	2.73	-13.30	0.46	-1.23	0.59	-5.14
AB	Calgary Signal Hill	36.37	16.98	60.15	0.34	2.39	-11.74	–	-1.70	0.71	-3.33
AB	Calgary Skyview	37.57	4.45	55.45	10.49	2.69	-13.84	–	-0.91	–	-3.74
AB	Edmonton Centre	44.35	13.14	37.90	5.29	15.51	-14.90	–	-0.11	0.86	-4.00
AB	Edmonton Gateway	37.27	11.85	50.59	7.48	4.92	-20.40	–	-0.21	0.91	-4.76
AB	Edmonton Griesbach	18.32	3.15	45.45	9.14	34.14	-6.22	0.62	-0.52	0.65	-5.29
AB	Edmonton Manning	35.34	14.77	53.09	11.97	9.91	-21.11	N/A		1.65	-5.36
AB	Edmonton Northwest	38.27	15.40	53.44	10.35	6.58	-21.04	0.61	0.58	1.09	-5.16
AB	Edmonton Riverbend	44.83	19.90	50.24	4.81	4.24	-20.19	–	-1.15	0.68	-3.34
AB	Edmonton Southeast	38.77	4.77	52.88	15.19	5.32	-17.00	N/A		1.85	-3.84
AB	Edmonton Strathcona	17.94	8.92	33.12	6.35	46.96	-11.00	0.61	-0.63	0.65	-3.87
AB	Edmonton West	40.66	16.21	52.87	7.25	5.36	-19.16	–	-0.05	0.90	-4.19
AB	Foothills	19.07	12.12	76.33	7.91	2.67	-8.72	0.82	-0.50	1.11	-7.11
AB	Fort McMurray—Cold Lake	14.54	7.47	80.15	12.34	2.70	-7.41	0.59	-0.39	1.81	-10.89
AB	Grande Prairie	11.84	7.63	81.67	12.71	4.19	-7.66	N/A		1.41	-8.79
AB	Lakeland	12.17	7.20	80.97	11.57	3.80	-6.70	0.73	-0.16	1.74	-9.33
AB	Leduc—Wetaskiwin	17.36	10.26	74.73	11.36	6.12	-11.48	–	-0.02	1.07	-10.13
AB	Lethbridge	32.72	17.58	61.05	5.40	3.63	-15.68	0.68	0.68	0.71	-6.23
AB	Medicine Hat—Cardston—Warner	17.66	10.59	76.74	10.95	4.78	-9.11	0.81	-0.57	–	-9.32
AB	Parkland	17.85	11.60	75.19	12.10	4.15	-12.14	0.63	0.63	1.50	-9.78
AB	Peace River—Westlock	11.76	6.28	77.07	14.41	5.46	-7.70	–	-0.75	–	-12.53
AB	Ponoka—Didsbury	–	-4.65	81.81	13.94	10.81	-0.14	N/A		1.88	-11.48
AB	Red Deer	21.94	13.77	71.55	11.04	3.84	-13.51	1.00	1.00	1.31	-9.98
AB	Sherwood Park—Fort Saskatchewan	27.17	14.94	66.32	8.76	5.07	-15.58	0.55	-0.43	0.61	-6.40
AB	St. Albert—Sturgeon River	29.86	18.47	63.95	7.92	4.79	-18.77	N/A		1.07	-6.73
AB	Yellowhead	25.21	14.60	69.08	8.84	3.97	-10.69	–	-1.25	1.37	-7.88
BC	Abbotsford—South Langley	33.89	7.84	43.09	-2.50	3.76	-14.46	1.03	-2.11	0.82	-6.18
BC	Burnaby Central	42.23	10.98	38.62	16.47	18.16	-21.61	–	-2.92	0.98	-2.40
BC	Burnaby North—Seymour	59.05	18.17	33.94	7.38	6.43	-20.08	–	-3.39	0.57	-2.08
BC	Cariboo—Prince George	30.40	14.14	60.32	9.15	6.16	-14.24	1.82	-1.66	0.69	-7.52
BC	Chilliwack—Hope	35.37	18.24	54.79	8.80	7.27	-19.15	1.65	-1.16	0.73	-6.92
BC	Cloverdale—Langley City	46.35	7.25	47.80	11.68	4.39	-15.57	0.92	0.92	0.54	-4.28
BC	Columbia—Kootenay—Southern Rockies	28.21	19.27	50.43	6.81	17.99	-18.65	1.49	-2.22	0.68	-6.41
BC	Coquitlam—Port Coquitlam	47.37	9.45	42.99	12.88	7.39	-20.20	0.88	0.88	–	-4.37
BC	Courtenay—Alberni	22.66	9.05	35.14	3.83	39.64	-3.24	1.69	-5.36	0.54	-4.46
BC	Cowichan—Malahat—Langford	28.20	11.82	37.24	8.89	32.59	-10.19	1.97	-4.25	–	-6.27
BC	Delta	51.83	9.28	43.15	9.62	4.40	-14.04	–	-2.23	0.62	-1.86
BC	Esquimalt—Saanich—Sooke	49.34	27.46	28.75	7.78	18.64	-24.60	2.67	-6.22	–	-4.65
BC	Fleetwood—Port Kells	47.91	1.97	44.17	15.65	5.94	-14.39	0.95	-0.97	1.03	-1.87
BC	Kamloops—Shuswap—Central Rockies	38.98	22.37	52.25	7.23	5.48	-19.55	2.41	-2.68	0.88	-7.27
BC	Kamloops—Thompson—Nicola	40.19	22.5	51.54	8.04	5.93	-22.63	1.51	-2.25	0.83	-5.14
BC	Kelowna	48.78	22.54	46.94	4.63	3.30	-17.85	0.98	-2.03	–	-7.29
BC	Langley Township—Fraser Heights	42.89	13.31	51.37	7.45	3.99	-15.53	0.75	-1.67	0.46	-4.04
BC	Mission—Matsqui—Abbotsford	36.64	12.43	56.70	9.58	4.61	-13.38	1.21	-2.50	0.84	-6.12
BC	Nanaimo—Ladysmith	27.76	14.58	35.46	8.88	18.26	-11.11	18.13	-7.72	0.39	-4.62
BC	New Westminster—Burnaby—Maillardville	35.09	11.65	31.43	10.41	31.55	-16.44	1.24	-2.55	–	-3.74
BC	North Island—Powell River	26.22	12.91	38.75	2.53	32.57	-6.89	1.86	-4.00	0.42	-4.14
BC	North Vancouver—Capilano	59.82	15.13	33.68	4.30	4.24	-14.82	1.70	-2.57	0.40	-2.17
BC	Okanagan Lake West—South Kelowna	44.19	20.97	50.92	2.57	3.36	-15.53	0.92	-1.82	0.47	-6.32
BC	Pitt Meadows—Maple Ridge	45.64	20.98	47.41	10.27	6.15	-25.14	–	-0.29	0.55	-4.98
BC	Port Moody—Coquitlam	43.53	14.05	40.40	8.44	15.05	-19.99	0.83	0.83	–	-3.32
BC	Prince George—Peace River—Northern Rockies	19.57	10.32	71.12	11.79	6.00	-8.37	2.13	-1.35	1.17	-9.23
BC	Richmond Centre—Marpole	44.71	6.14	49.56	14.10	4.44	-15.93	0.88	-2.25	0.41	-2.06
BC	Richmond East—Steveston	48.45	6.54	46.38	12.39	4.24	-15.14	0.93	-1.41	–	-2.38
BC	Saanich—Gulf Islands	31.85	13.04	25.09	2.44	3.96	-15.58	39.10	3.34	–	-3.01
BC	Similkameen—South Okanagan—West Kootenay	37.28	24.05	44.06	6.48	16.17	-22.80	1.53	-1.82	0.96	-5.91
BC	Skeena—Bulkley Valley	10.96	3.29	47.19	11.05	39.34	-3.24	1.18	-2.59	–	-7.72
BC	South Surrey—White Rock	50.50	11.60	45.67	3.23	2.49	-12.31	1.34	1.34	–	-3.86
BC	Surrey Centre	48.01	3.37	43.23	22.57	6.78	-20.78	0.95	-1.26	0.59	-3.26
BC	Surrey Newton	49.45	-4.98	43.99	28.76	6.02	-20.06	N/A		–	-2.61
BC	Vancouver Centre	55.22	14.55	30.28	8.38	12.59	-17.75	1.40	-2.41	0.39	-2.89
BC	Vancouver East	35.50	15.74	17.78	6.89	43.65	-12.75	1.92	-5.79	0.58	-2.21
BC	Vancouver Fraserview—South Burnaby	52.30	9.99	35.68	13.80	9.81	-21.28	1.27	0.26	0.93	-2.06
BC	Vancouver Granville	62.12	24.89	28.76	4.10	7.53	-25.38	1.59	-1.14	–	-2.38
BC	Vancouver Kingsway	36.64	7.62	24.49	10.34	37.24	-13.16	0.99	-2.64	0.64	-1.57
BC	Vancouver Quadra	63.19	19.80	30.37	1.15	4.27	-15.12	1.84	-4.12	0.33	-1.70
BC	Vernon—Lake Country—Monashee	42.85	23.08	50.42	6.59	5.09	-16.62	1.65	-3.54	–	-9.51
BC	Victoria	54.28	27.02	16.99	3.27	24.91	-18.98	3.10	-8.09	0.37	-2.73
BC	West Vancouver—Sunshine Coast—Sea to Sky Country	59.74	26.70	32.97	3.83	3.22	-23.66	3.43	-3.37	0.48	-3.28
Terr	Yukon	53.05	19.71	38.52	12.26	6.34	-16.10	2.09	-2.27	N/A	
Terr	Northwest Territories	53.51	15.29	33.31	18.90	12.15	-20.19	1.03	-1.30	N/A	
Terr	Nunavut	36.72	0.86	26.02	9.55	37.26	-10.41	N/A		N/A	

== Significant results among independent and minor party candidates ==
Those candidates not belonging to a major party, receiving more than 1,000 votes in the election, are listed below:

Significant vote tallies for independent and minor party candidates
Riding		Candidate		Votes	Placed
Battle River—Crowfoot	AB	█ People's	Jonathan Bridges	1,022	4th
Calgary Skyview	AB	█ Independent	Minesh Patel	1,002	4th
Edmonton Gateway	AB	█ No affiliation	Rod Loyola	2,455	4th
Parkland	AB	█ People's	Jason Lavigne	1,066	4th
Peace River—Westlock	AB	█ Independent	Darrell Teske	3,048	3rd
Ponoka—Didsbury	AB	█ People's	Larry Gratton	1,289	5th
Ponoka—Didsbury	AB	█ United	Grant Abraham	2,129	3rd
Ponoka—Didsbury	AB	█ No affiliation	Zarnab Zafar (Note: Endorsed by the Liberals.)	1,641	4th
Abbotsford—South Langley	BC	█ Independent	Michael de Jong	9,747	3rd
Acadie—Bathurst	NB	█ People's	Randi Rachelle Raynard	1,043	4th
Brampton East	ON	█ People's	Jeff Lal	2,305	3rd
Chatham-Kent—Leamington	ON	█ People's	Trevor Lee	1,061	4th
Elgin—St. Thomas—London South	ON	█ People's	Stephen Campbell	1,256	4th
Niagara South	ON	█ People's	Peter Taras	1,147	4th
Oxford	ON	█ Christian Heritage	Jacob Watson	1,203	4th
Parry Sound—Muskoka	ON	█ People's	Isabel Pereira	1,048	4th
Perth—Wellington	ON	█ People's	Wayne Baker	1,069	4th
Sarnia—Lambton—Bkejwanong	ON	█ People's	Brian Everaert	1,136	4th
Beauce	QC	█ People's	Maxime Bernier	3,626	4th
Québec Centre	QC	█ People's	Daniel Brisson	2,818	4th
Québec Centre	QC	█ Independent	Patrick Kerr	1,018	5th
Moose Jaw—Lake Centre—Lanigan	SK	█ People's	Chey Craik	1,358	4th

== Analysis and aftermath ==
Party candidates in 1st and 2nd place
Party in 1st place	Party in 2nd place					Total
Party in 1st place	Lib	Con	BQ	NDP	Grn	Total
Liberal		141	22	6		169
Conservative	135		2	6	1	144
Bloc Québécois	21	1				22
New Democratic	5	2				7
Green	1					1
Total	162	144	24	12	1	343

Principal races, according to 1st and 2nd-place results
Parties		Seats
█ Liberal	█ Conservative	276
█ Liberal	█ Bloc Québécois	43
█ Liberal	█ New Democratic	11
█ Conservative	█ New Democratic	8
█ Conservative	█ Bloc Québécois	3
█ Conservative	█ Green	1
█ Liberal	█ Green	1
Total		343

Party rankings (1st to 5th place)
Party	1st	2nd	3rd	4th	5th
Liberal	169	162	11		
Conservative	144	144	49	5	
Bloc Québécois	22	24	30	2	
New Democratic	7	12	243	79	1
Green	1	1	6	131	90
Independent			2	7	20
People's			1	90	110
United Party			1	1	5
Christian Heritage				5	6
Libertarian				2	6
Canadian Future				2	4
Communist				1	7
Rhinoceros				1	7
Centrist				1	5
Animal Protection				1	2
Marxist–Leninist					7

2025 vs 2021

2025 (by winning party)
2025 vs 2021

2025 (by party finishing second)
2025 vs 2021

2025
2025 vs 2021

2025 (by winning party)

== Post-election analysis ==
=== Elections Canada ===
Elections Canada reported the following general characteristics of voter turnout in the election, compared to 2021:

Estimated voter turnout %, by age and sex, all Canada (2025 v 2021)
Age group	All voters			Male			Female		
Age group	2025	2021	Change (pp)	2025	2021	Change (pp)	2025	2021	Change (pp)
First-time voters	55.3	44.7	10.6▲	52.4	41.3	11.1▲	58.4	48.3	10.1▲
Not first time	56.5	47.4	9.1▲	53.3	43.7	9.6▲	60.0	51.3	8.7▲
18–24 yrs	55.9	46.7	9.2▲	52.8	43.1	9.7▲	59.2	50.5	8.7▲
25–34 yrs	59.6	52.8	6.8▲	58.2	49.9	8.3▲	61.0	55.8	5.2▲
35–44 yrs	65.4	59.0	6.4▲	64.8	57.5	7.3▲	66.1	60.5	5.6▲
45–54 yrs	70.5	63.8	6.7▲	69.3	62.5	6.8▲	71.6	65.0	6.6▲
55–64 yrs	73.4	68.3	5.1▲	72.4	66.7	5.7▲	74.3	69.8	4.5▲
65–74 yrs	77.6	74.9	2.7▲	77.5	74.3	3.2▲	77.6	75.6	2.0▲
75 yrs +	69.1	65.9	3.2▲	74.2	67.7	6.5▲	65.3	64.3	1.0▲
All ages	68.0	62.2	5.8▲	67.4	60.6	6.8▲	68.5	63.8	4.7▲
