= West End, Kamloops =

West End
- Neighbourhood
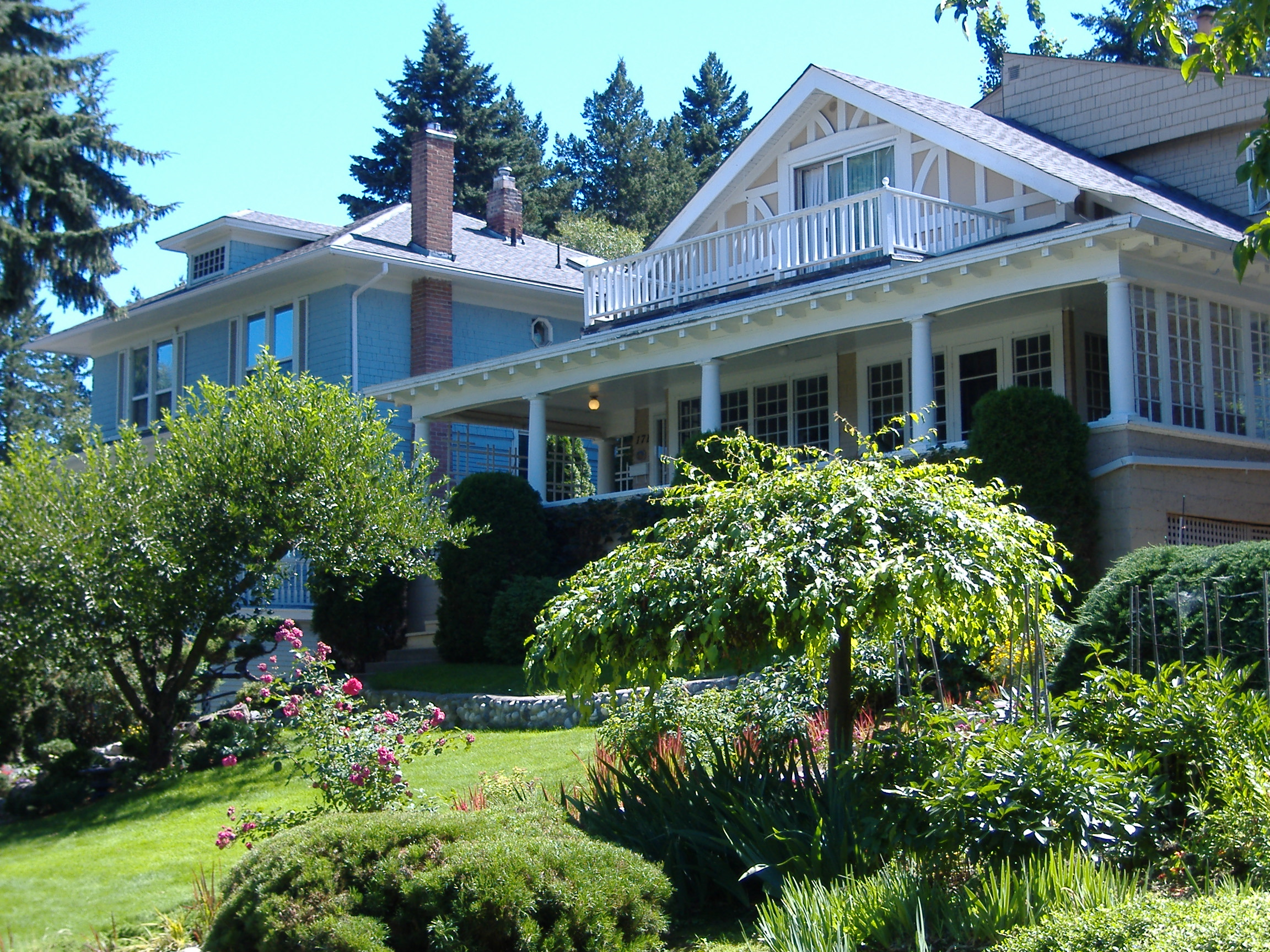
- A residence in the West End
- Interactive map of West End
- Coordinates: 50.675°N 120.340°W
- Country: Canada
- Province: British Columbia
- City: Kamloops
- Development began: Late 1800s
- Incorporated into Kamloops: 1893

Government
  - MP: Frank Caputo (Kamloops—Thompson—Cariboo)
  - MLA: Peter Milobar (Kamloops Centre)

The West End (Shuswap language: Tk'emlul̓pe) is an inner-city, South Shore neighbourhood of Kamloops, British Columbia in Canada. It is the city's oldest residential neighbourhood and has the largest proportion of heritage-designated buildings, including Kamloops' oldest public building, St. Andrew's on the Square (1887). In addition, the city's third and oldest surviving school, Stuart Wood School, is located in the West End, as are the Kamloops Museum and Archives, St. Ann's Academy, the Kamloops Cenotaph at Memorial Hill Park, and the Kamloops Chinese Cemetery. Also notable are the large number of tall, broad deciduous trees planted in yards and along boulevards in the neighbourhood. These contribute to making the West End one of the greenest and shadiest areas of the city.

== Geography ==
The West End, located on Kamloops' South Shore (i.e., south of the Thompson River), is generally considered to be the area of Kamloops bounded to the East by 2nd Avenue, to the West by Summit Drive, to the North by Victoria Street West and to the South by Columbia Street. The neighbourhood is not necessarily regarded as the western end of Kamloops itself (the Brocklehurst area of the North Shore lies further to the West), but rather as the western end of the downtown area.

== History ==
=== 19th century ===
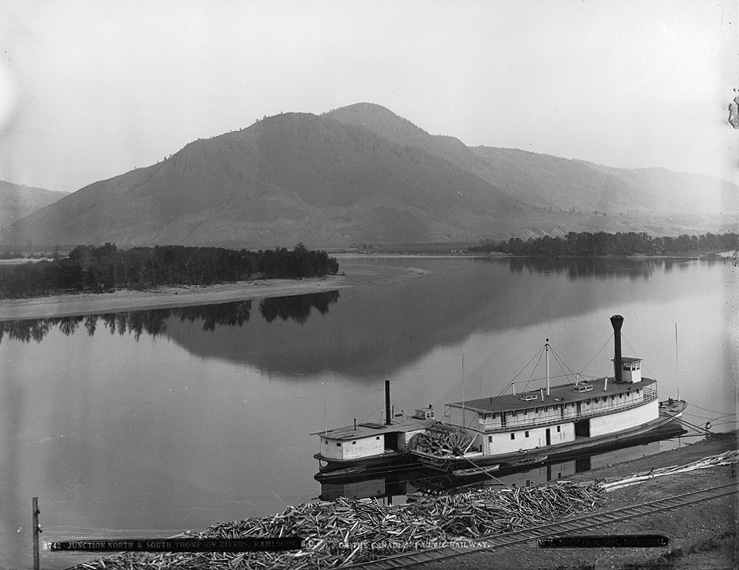
View from the West End of the junction of the North and South Thompson Rivers, 1887

During Kamloops' evolution in the 19th century, the West End was the main site of residential settlement in the growing town. The West End was home to many of Kamloops' most prominent early citizens, as demonstrated by the size and grandeur of many of the homes. The name of Nicola Wagon Road in the neighbourhood bears witness to the fact that the West End was the first concentration of inhabitation in what would become one of British Columbia's most spread-out cities.

=== 20th century ===
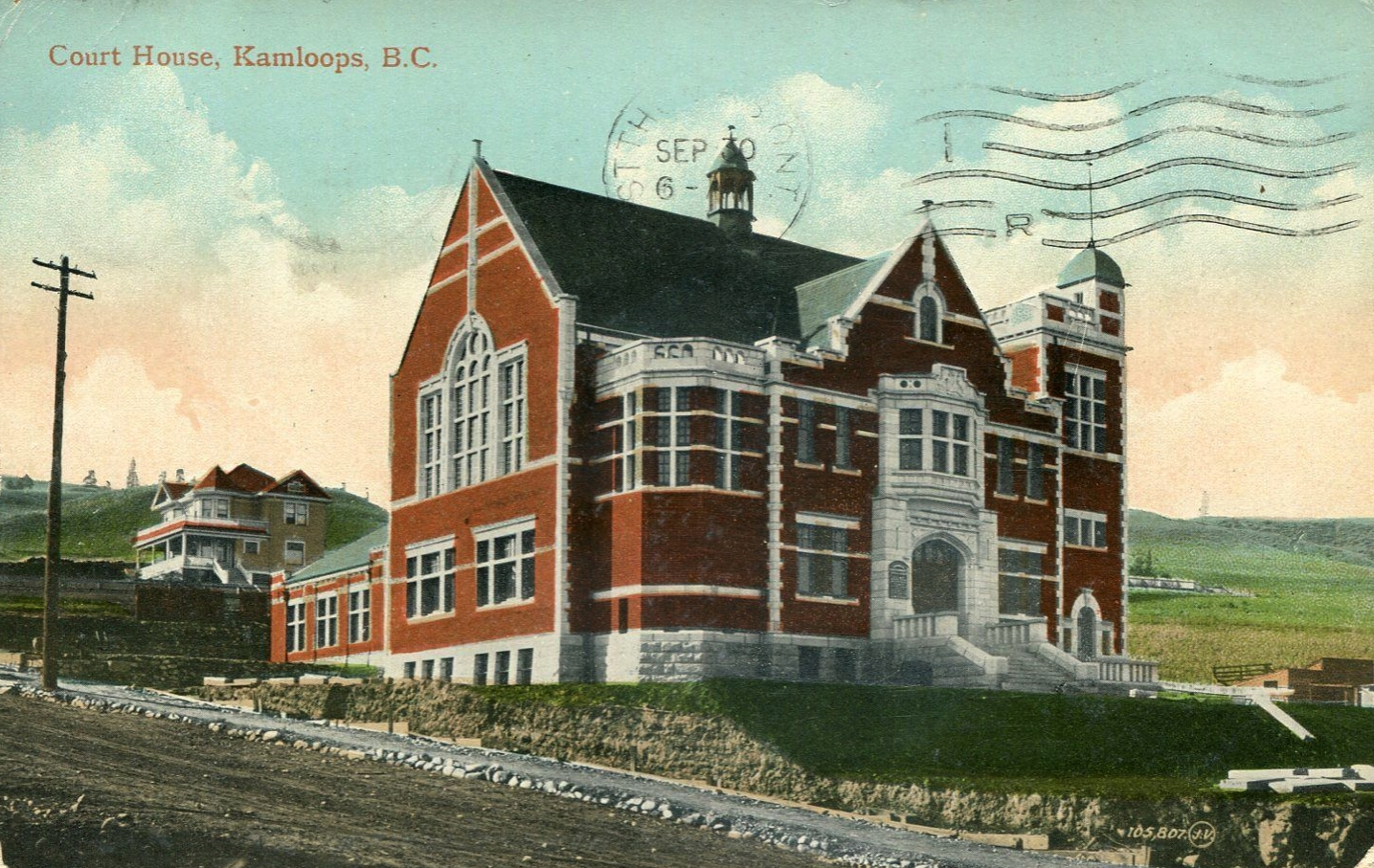
A postcard from 1911 showing the Old Kamloops Court House in the West End

Construction began on Kamloops' courthouse in 1909 in the West End. The Old Kamloops Courthouse became a landmark complex, replacing two previous courthouses located elsewhere in the city. Funded by a $20,000 provincial grant approved in 1907, the courthouse and perimeter wall were completed in 1909, with the Land Registry added to the rear in 1911.

The building's construction reflected Kamloops' importance as a commercial and industrial center in the early 1900s British Columbia Interior. Built in the Edwardian Baroque style with Arts and Crafts interior elements, the courthouse featured local materials including brick, British Columbia stone, and wood from local lumber mills. Designed by architects Dalton & Eveleigh with stained glass by Charles Bloomfield, it stands as one of the province's most striking Edwardian public buildings.

=== 21st century ===
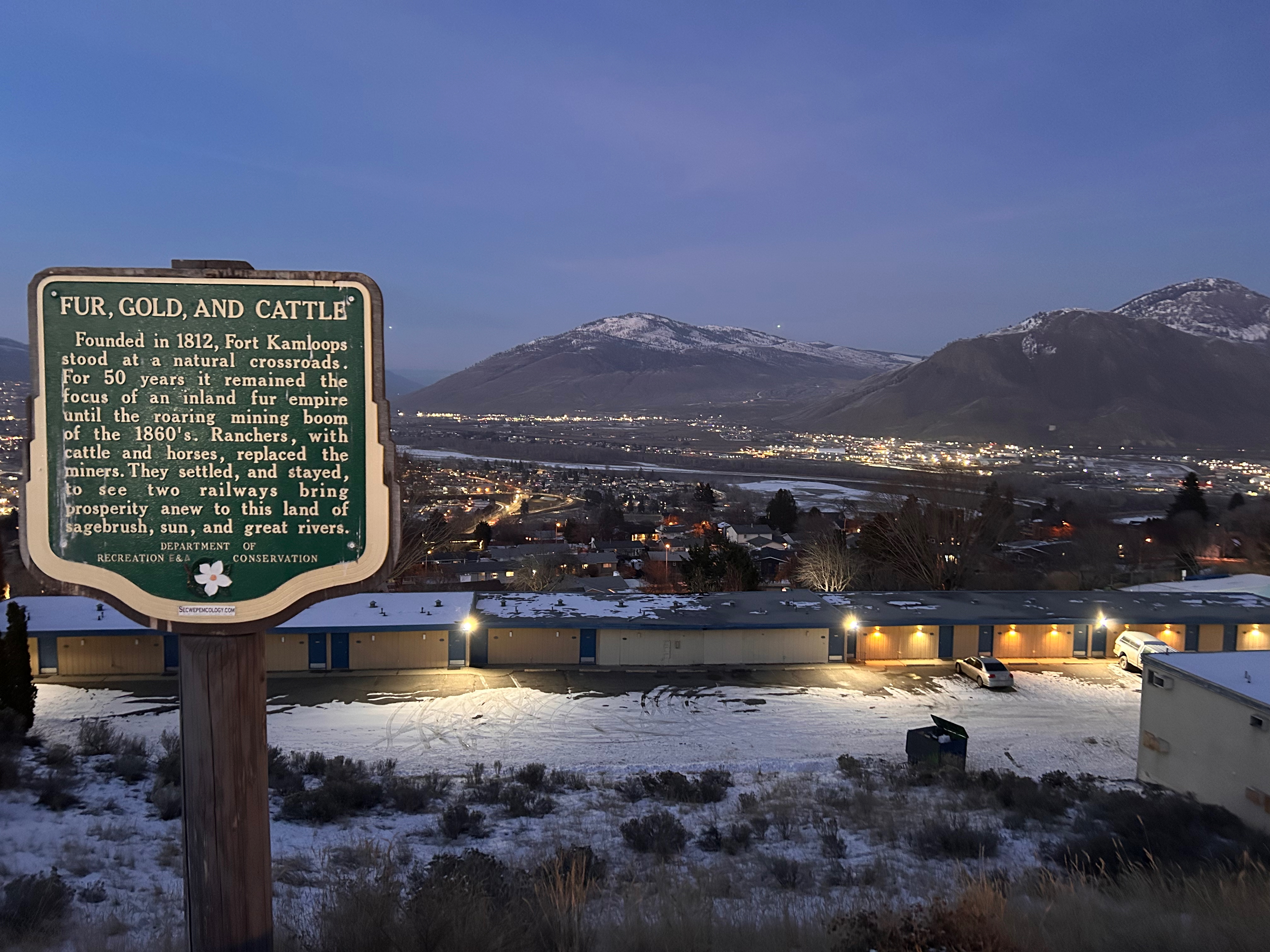
View from College Height's Columbia Lookout

While a number of more modern houses have been built in the neighbourhood, wood-panelled and stucco homes remain the norm. Today, the West End is predominantly zoned for residential use, with minimal commercial presence. The neighbourhood encompasses several informally recognized subdivisions:

- College Heights
- Guerin Creek
- Hudson's Ridge
- McIntosh Heights
- Powers Addition

In the western and upper portions of the original West End, McIntosh Heights features primarily single-family homes, while the Powers Addition area contains a mix of single-family residences and duplexes. The area west of Guerin Creek ravine displays greater residential diversity, including duplexes, townhouses, and apartment buildings.

More recent development projects include the Guerin Creek area, which is characterized by larger single-family homes, and the multi-phase Hudson's Ridge development across Summit Drive, featuring a combination of townhouses and single-family residences on compact urban lots.

The southern section of the neighbourhood, known as College Heights, comprises numerous post-war townhouse complexes and walk-up apartment buildings. These properties frequently serve as housing for Thompson Rivers University students, staff, and faculty due to their proximity to the campus.

== Topography ==
The West End is relatively one of the lowest areas of Kamloops, located far below Aberdeen Hills, but the neighbourhood itself is very hilly. Nicola Street West and Clarke Street slope considerably to the west of Lee Road, while Battle Street Hill carries the central and northern portions of the neighbourhood significantly upward toward the College Heights area below Thompson Rivers University.

== Gallery ==
Houses in the West End

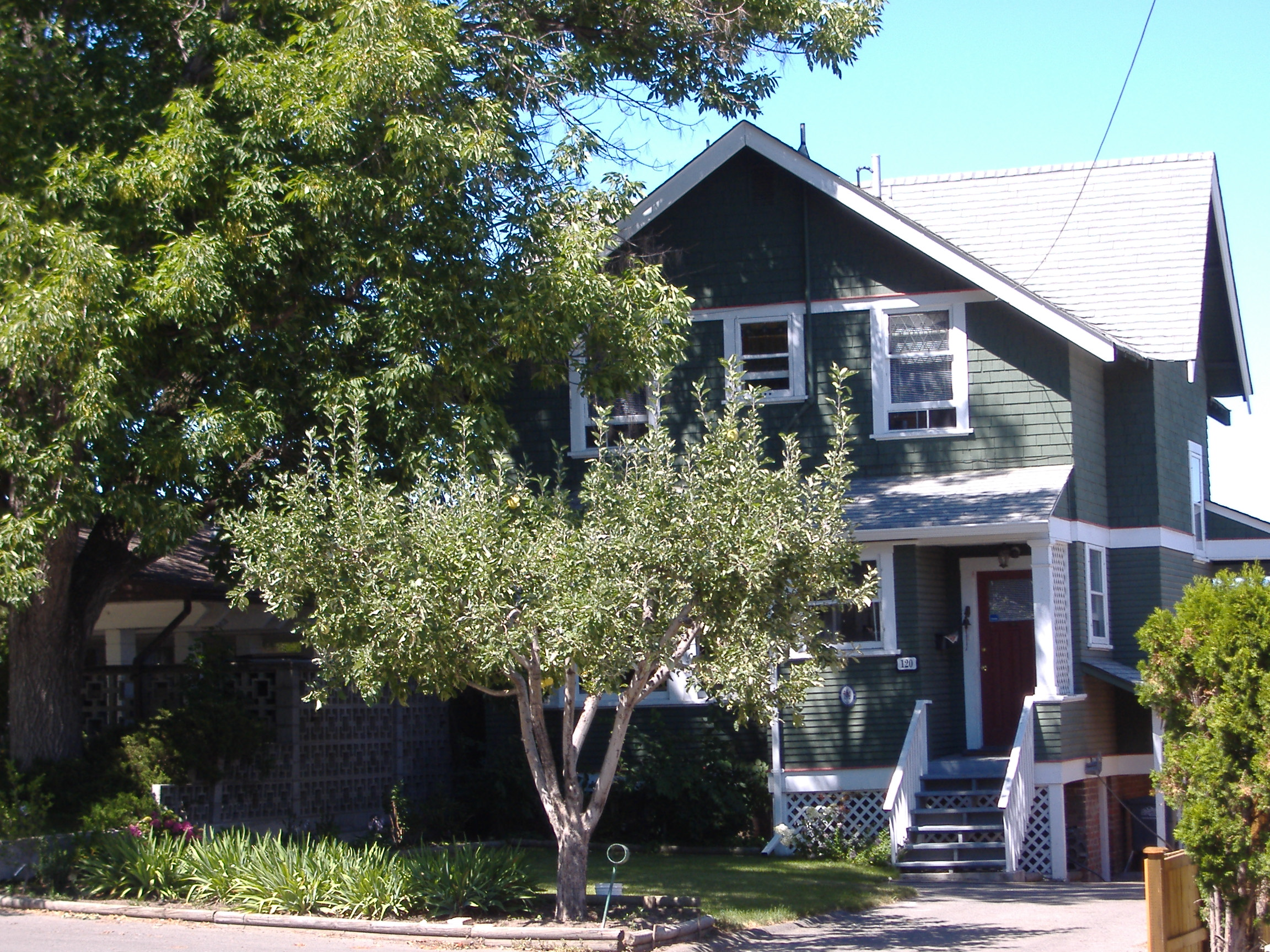

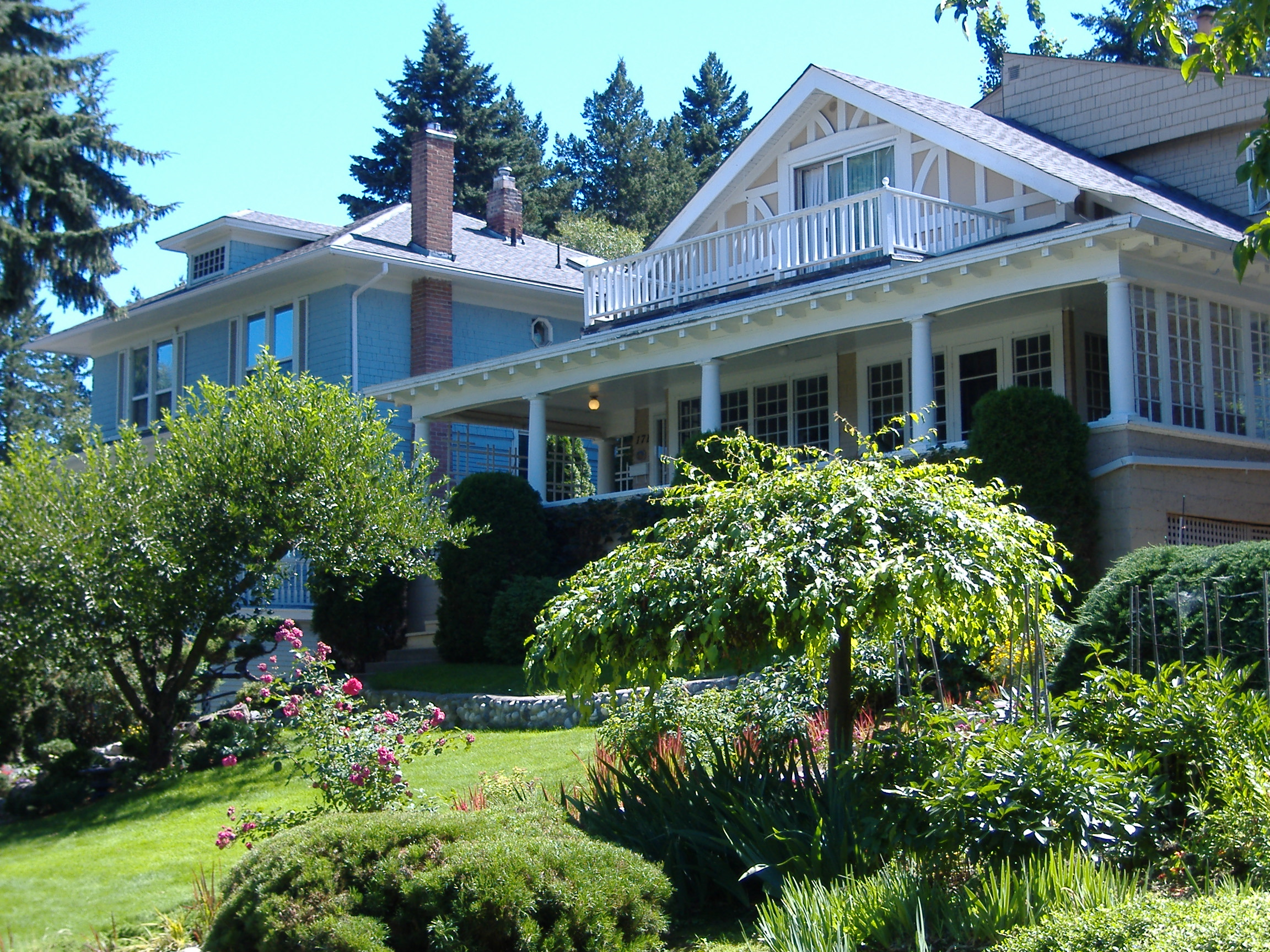

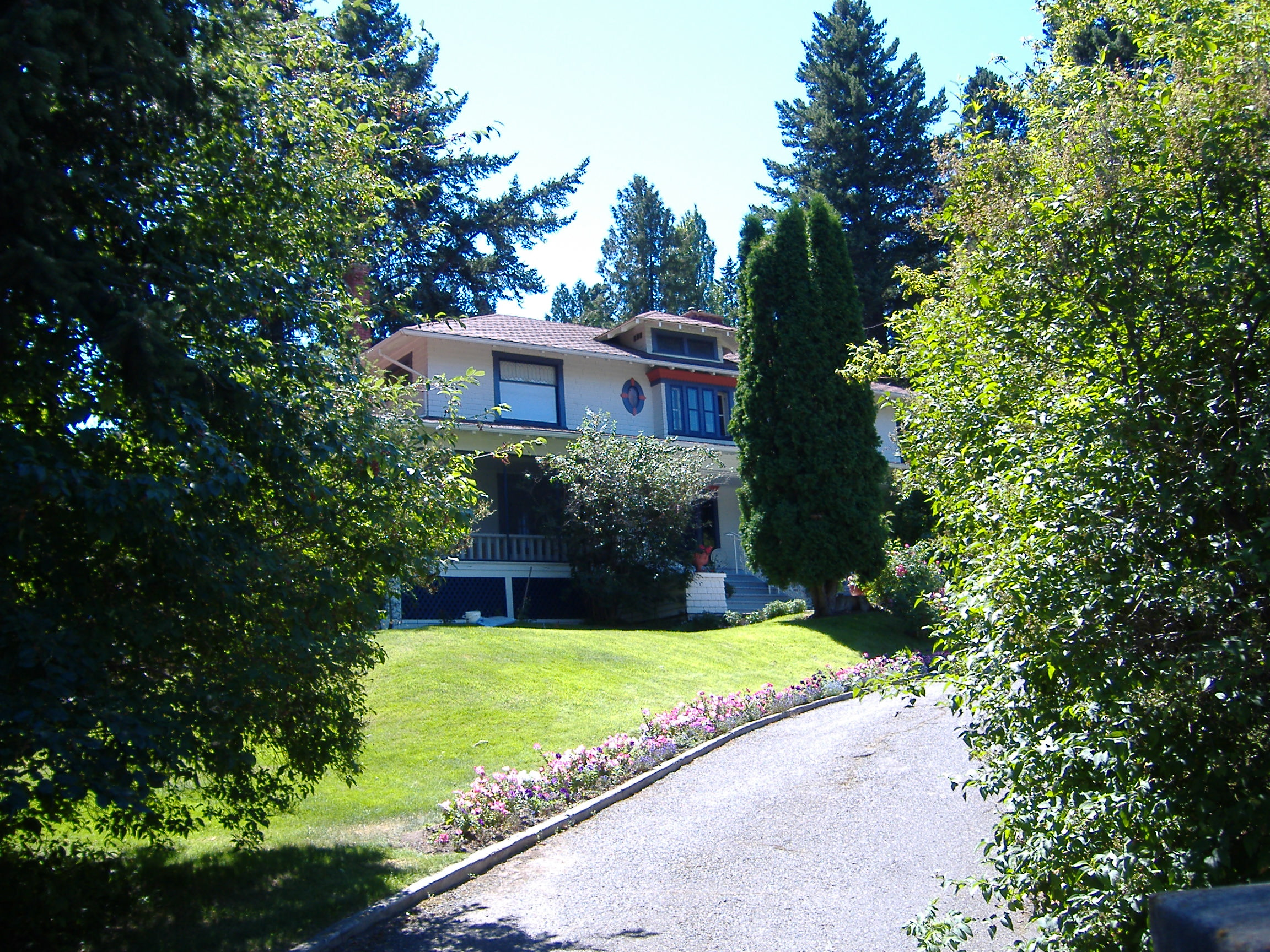

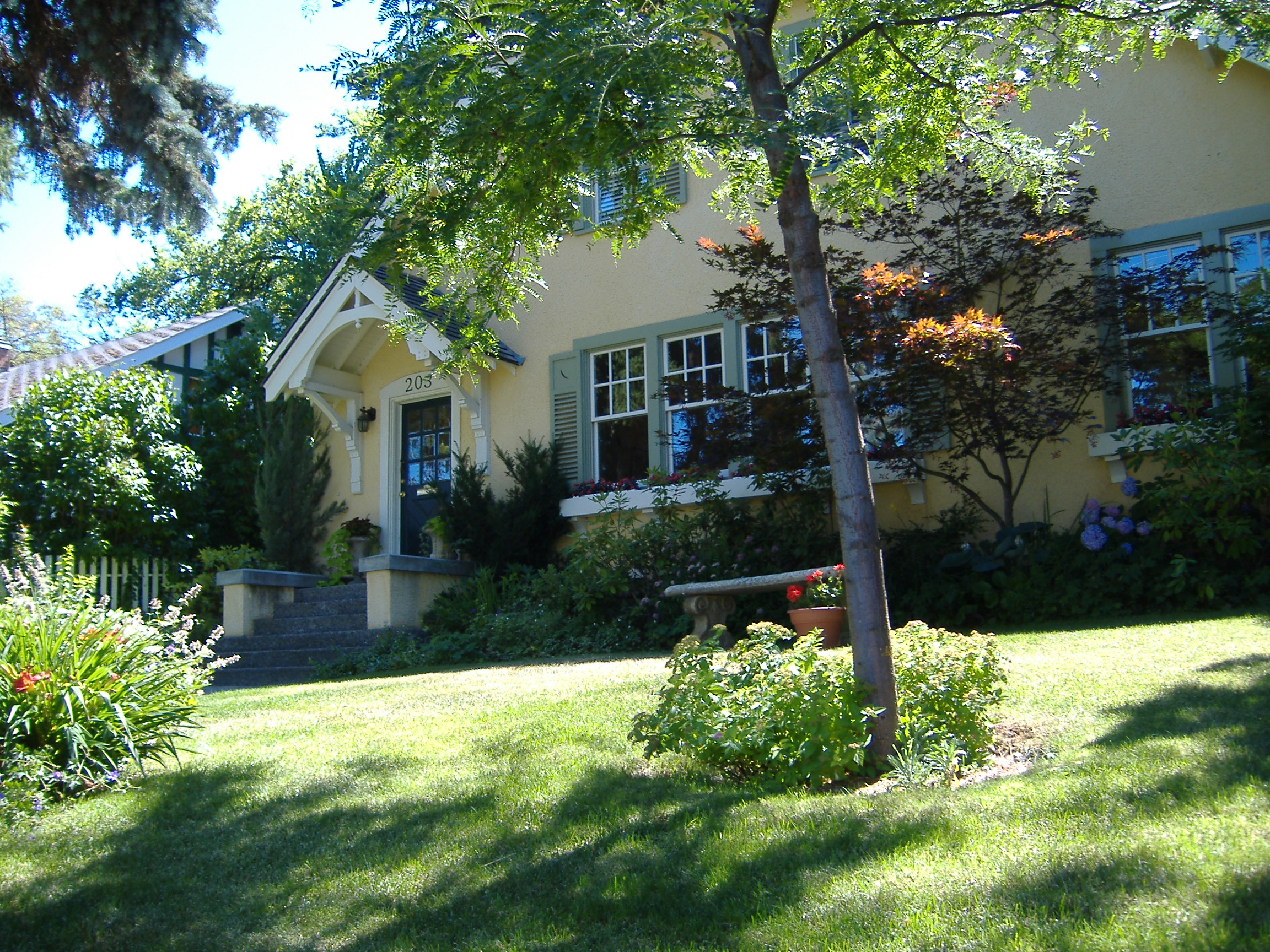

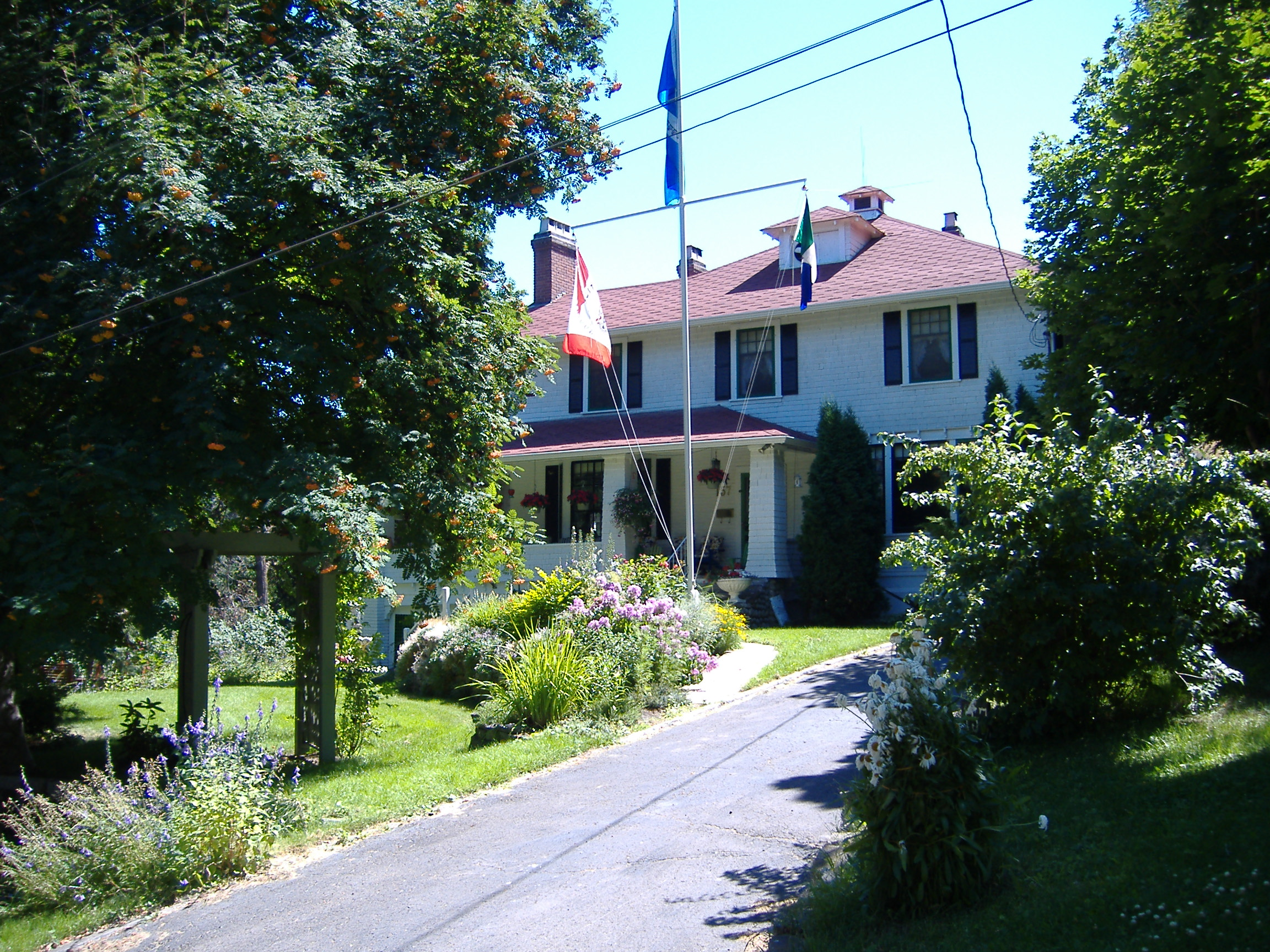
