= Okanagrion =

Okanagrion Temporal range: Ypresian–Ypresian

Scientific classification
- Kingdom: Animalia
- Phylum: Arthropoda
- Clade: Pancrustacea
- Class: Insecta
- Order: Odonata
- Family: †Dysagrionidae
- Subfamily: †Dysagrioninae
- Genus: †Okanagrion; Archibald et al., 2021

Species
- 8 species

Extinct genus of damselflies

Okanagrion is an extinct odonate genus in the damselfly-like family Dysagrionidae. The genus was first described in 2021 with a series of eight species included from early Eocene Okanagan Highlands sites in western North America. The genus is known from the Late Ypresian sediments exposed in northeast central Washington at Republic where five species are present, and from the coeval McAbee Fossil Beds near Cache Creek in Central British Columbia, where four species are present. The species richness is attributed to high latitude high alpha diversity resulting from climatic equitability during the Early Eocene in combination with resultant beta diversity between sites due to impassible topographical barriers.

== Distribution ==
McAbee and Republic

Okanagrion fossils have been found at two sites belonging to the Eocene Okanagan Highlands of Washington and British Columbia. Of the eight described species, O. angustum, O. beardi, and O. lochmum are only found at the Tranquille Formation's McAbee Fossil Beds west of Cache Creek in central British Columbia. The lake sediments at McAbee were first radiometrically dated using the K-Ar method in the 1960s based on ash samples exposed in the lake bed. These samples yielded an age of ~51 million years ago; however, dating published in 2005 provided a ^{40}Ar-^{39}Ar radiometric date placing the McAbee site at 52.9 ± 0.83 million years ago.

Four additional species are known exclusively from fossils of the Klondike Mountain Formation exposed at Republic in Ferry County, northeast Central Washington. Two species, Okanagrion dorrellae and O. liquetoalatum are known only from the "Boot Hill" site UWBM B4131, while O. threadgillae is only known from the "Corner lot" site A0307 and one species, O. worleyae is reported from both the "Boot hill" and "Corner lot" sites. Tuffs of the Klondike Mountain Formation had been dated to 49.42 ± 0.54 million years ago, the youngest of the Okanagan Highlands sites, though a revised oldest age of 51.2 ± 0.1 million years ago was given based on isotopic data published in 2021.

The widest distribution is that of Okanagrion hobani, for which multiple fossils have been recovered from both Republic sites and at McAbee, the only Okanagrion species to be found in multiple formations.

== History and classification ==
Ischnura aurora with nodus and arculus veins labeled

The first brief report of an Okanagan Highlands fossil odonate was by Standley Lewis in a 1992 Washington Geology article where he illustrated two fossils tentatively identified as (?)Zacallites from Republic. Four years later a list of insects from Republic was published by Wesley Wehr and Lisa Barksdale in a 1996 Washington Geology article. They expanded the tentative families to include Euphaeidae, Megapodagrionidae, Platycnemididae or Megapodagrionidae, and Lestidae but did not designate the fossil specimens each identification was based on. The odonate fossil material was studied subsequently by S. Bruce Archibald and Robert Cannings with a series of papers being published between 2019 and 2021 on the dragonflies and damselflies of the Okanagan Highlands. The new genus Okanagrion was named by Archibald and Cannings (2021) with a series of eight named species and a group of unplaced fossils which were not placeable to species. They coined the genus name Okanagrion as a combination of a toponym honoring the Okanagan Highlands plus the suffix "-agrion", from the Greek "ἄγριος", commonly used in damselfly genus names.

Based on shared characters of the wings, such as a missing crossvein O and the CuA–A space being expanded, Archibald and Cannings placed the new genus into the extinct family Dysagrionidae. Separation of the two dysagrionid subfamilies is based on the basal origin point of wing vein RP3-4, in the Petrolestinae species this is positioned midway between the arculus and subnodus veins, while in Dysagrioninae species the placement is around 2/3 of the distance towards the subnodus from the arculus. additionally the IR2 vein in petrolestines branches from very near or on the RP3-4, but forks at or on the subnodus in Dysagrionines. With Okanagrion the RP3-4 originates near the 2/3 point towards the subnodus, while the IR2 forks from or directly basal to the subnodus.

The subordinal placement of Dysagrionidae is controversial. Until 2021 the family had been treated as likely belonging to the living odonate suborder Zygoptera (damselflies), however the known head morphology of the included species has led to occasional placement questions. The Cretaceous dysagrionid genus Congqingia has had affiliation with the suborder Anisozygoptera and Dysagrionidae has been noted to be Zygoptera(?) on occasion. Archibald, Cannings, and Robert Erickson evaluated the known head morphology of the fossils and concluded that they did not belong to any of the three defined odonate suborders, but instead were part of a new suborder they named Cephalozygoptera. The suborder was based on the zygopteran body plan, but considered distinct due to the eye to head capsule structure and distances. Unlike zygopterans where the head is 3-5 times as wide as long, in cephalozygopterans the heads are only around double as wide as long making them narrower than in any zygopterans. The distance between the eyes in cephalozygopterans, at about one eye width, was also suggested to be different from known zygopterans where the width is typically at more than doubled. The erection of Cephalozygoptera was criticized by Andre Nel and Darren Zheng (2021) who argued that the noted differences were due in part to deformation of the head and eye areas during deposition and fossilization combined with characters that are present in a larger group of odonates than Archibald, Cannings, and Erickson reported. Based on their review and critique of the justifications for cephalozygoptera, Nel and Zhang considered the name and grouping unwarranted and proposed it to be treated as a synonym of Zygoptera. Archibald and Cannings (2021) responded to the arguments, maintaining that Cephalozygoptera as valid. In subsequent papers both suborders have been used, depending on if the author group includes Archibald or Nel.

== Description ==
Okanagrion species are united by a series of features that are not seen in total in any other Dysagrioninae taxon. Okanagrion species wings have a pterostigma which is between 3 and 3.5 times wider than tall, with a few exceptions where the width is 4 times wider. The genus is missing the oblique brace vein, which is present or unreported for the majority of dysagrionine species and there are no accessory crossveins immediately basal or apical to the CuP. The costal space apical of the pterostigma is between three and four cells wide. The petiole section of the wings ends basally to the CuA and CuP veins.

Between the species, coloration and patterning of the wings are widely varied, most species having broad areas of either light to clear windows on a darkened background, or conversely smaller areas of darkened membrane on light to clear background wing. At least one species O. liquetoalatum is noted to have a fully hyaline wing. In all species, the fore and hindwings are very similar, so differentiation is difficult. Based on the associated wings of the O. threadgillae holotype, Archibald and Cannings treat the assumed hindwings as having a basal hind margin as being smoothly curved from base to level with the quadrangle cell, while the front margin is nearly straight between the nodus and the pterostigma. In the assumed forewings the basal hind margin is mildly convex and widened when reaching the level of the quadrangle cell base, while the front margin between nodus and pterostigma is slightly curved.

=== Okanagrion angustum ===
Okanagrion angustum is one of the four species found at the McAbee Fossil Beds, being known at the time of description from only the holotype fossil, Royal British Columbia Museum specimen "RBCM.EH2017.050.11.2491" found by John Leahy. Archibald and Cannings coined the specific epithet from the Latin angustum meaning "narrow" in reference to the overall wing shape estimate.

The specimen is a partial wing indeterminate regarding sex and being forewing or hindwing, as it is missing the basal third of the wing and areas of the apical two-thirds. The wing is overall narrower at the point of the nodus, 5.5 mm (0.22 in) wide, than most other Okanagrion specie. Only two species have a narrower nodus point, O. worleyae and O. dorrellae at 4.5 mm (0.18 in) and 4.0 mm (0.16 in) respectively. The O. angustum wing has an IR2 vein which forked from the RP1-2 vein origin, a fork point only shared with O. beardi, while the other species have fork points between the RP1-2 and RP3-4 veins. O. angustum also differs from O. beardi and O. dorrellae in having a longer length of the Ax1 vein to the nodus.

While the coloration is similar to O. hobani, the darkened apical area is shorter and the dark mid-wing stripe does not seem to extend fully to the hind margin, but only covers a u-shaped region extending from the front margin.

=== Okanagrion beardi ===
The McAbee species Okanagrion beardi is known from two specimens, the holotype, "F-791", in the Thompson Rivers University collection, and the paratype, "RBCM P1546" of the Royal British Columbia Museum collections. Both fossils were recovered from the Hoodoo Face beds, with the collector and collection date of "F-791" unknown, while "RBCM P1546" was collected in June 1998 by an 8th or 9th grade student and donated to the RBCM by Graham Beard. Archibald and Cannings chose the species name "beardi" in recognition of Beard for his long dedication and energy towards British Columbian paleontology.

Specimen "F-791" has the better preserved wing venation with one full forewing and portions of at least two other wings, possibly all three present. In addition there are fragments of the abdomen, part of the thorax, and possibly part of one eye preserved as a disarticulated grouping around the wings. The forewing is 8.3 mm (0.33 in) wide by 31.5 mm (1.24 in) long from the arculus to wing tip, and is only missing a few small areas of apical area and near the nodus. The distance from the nodus to pterostigma is 16.8 mm (0.66 in), while the distance from the arculus to pterostigma is 22.0 mm (0.87 in). The overall wing outline on the apical side of the nodus is oval with symmetry centered on the lateral midline. The coloration is similar to O. hobani with the basal area of the wings hyaline, the apical areas darkened, with a light colored to hyaline fascia. While the basal hyaline area also encompasses the basal 2/5 of the wing, O. beardi differs from O. hobani in the size of the fascia which is only 1/2 as wide in O. beardi. Additionally in some specimens of O. hobani the fascia extends across the will wing width, while it doesn't fully cross the wing in O. beardi.

For "RBCM P1546" the wings are mostly absent, with only one well preserved forewing, and a basal section of one hind wing present. However, the head, thorax and the base of the abdomen are all present, along with scraps of the legs. The head is fairly well preserved, though labrum and clypeus are both indistinct and lacking detail. A 4.1 mm (0.16 in) width across the head at the widest point is reported and the eyes are given 1.5 mm × 2.0 mm (0.059 in × 0.079 in) dimensions. The distance between the eyes is 1.2 mm (0.047 in). The thorax has an overall dark coloration, with a possible light stripe running over the mesopleural area on the mesothorax. The leg sections present are too badly damaged and disarticulated to tell any detail. The abdomen is only present as sections one and two. While the underside of the segment may have remnants of the secondary male genitalia, there isn't enough detail left to confirm the sex of the specimen.

=== Okanagrion dorrellae ===
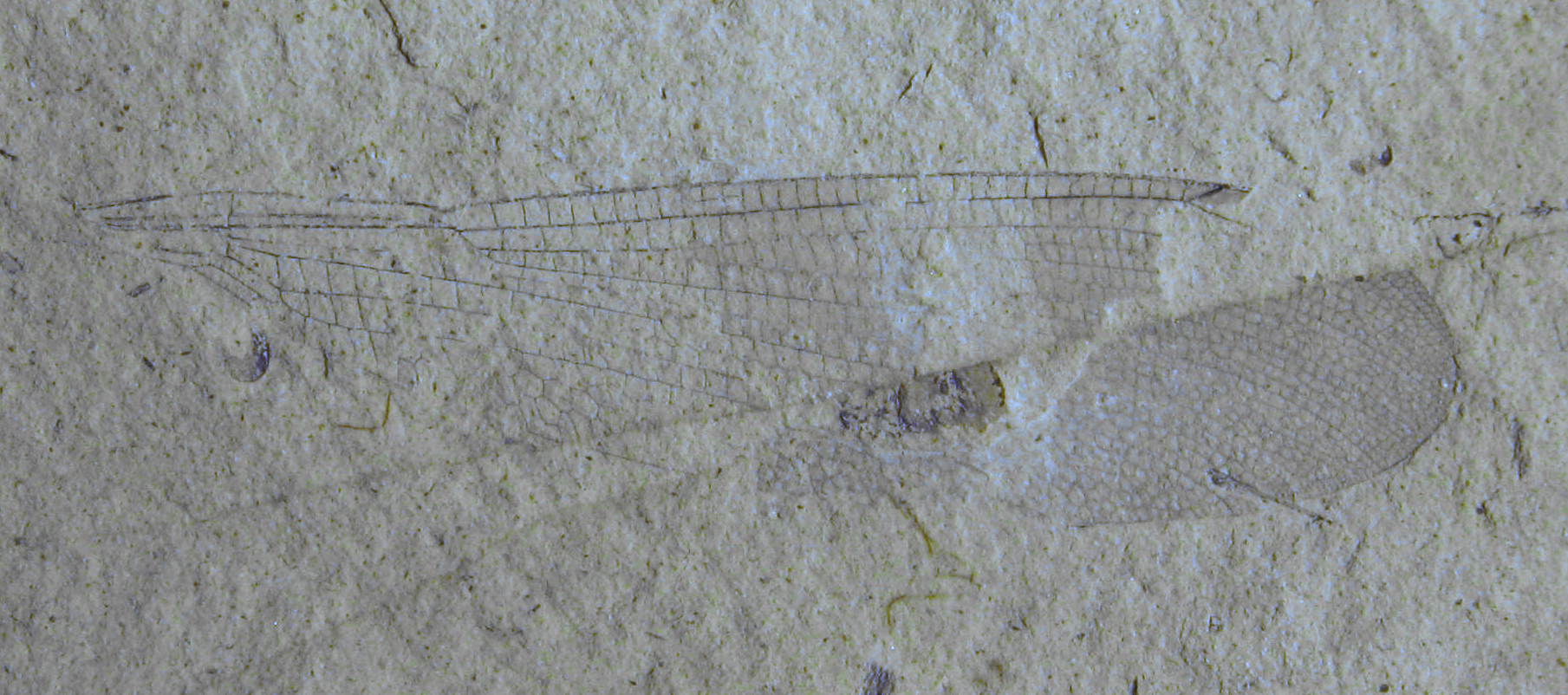
Okanagrion dorrellae holotype

Okanagrion dorrellae is known from the lone holotype fossil collected from the Klondike Mountain Formation and housed in the Stonerose Interpretive Center collections as "SR 93-11-02". The specimen was collected and donated by Laurie Dorrell on October 31, 1992, and as such Archibald and Cannings chose to name the species dorrellae in recognition.

"SR 93-11-02" wasn't identified to either gender or forewing/hindwing in the species description. The wing is 7.0 mm (0.28 in) wide and 25.6 mm (1.01 in) long from arculus to apex, with one diagonal break running across the whole wing, but not distorting the venation. The nodus of the wing is placed 26% of the distance from wing base to apex, and the pterostigma starts 15.3 mm (0.60 in) apically from there. Coloration of the wing is interpreted to be light to hyaline in the basal half transitioning to dark in the apical half. A lighter fascia is present in the darkened area between the nodus and pterostigma, extending down from the frontal wing edge to around the wing midpoint. Due to the region not being preserved, the true length of the pterostigma is uncertain, and the width of the costal space apical of the pterostigma is only estimated as 3 cells wide.

=== Okanagrion hobani ===
Okanagrion hobani paratype

Okanagrion hobani is the most common of the described Okanagrion species, being known from the holotype, a series of nine paratypes, plus a group of seven "additional material" specimens attributed to the species but not included as type specimens. The species is the only one to be found in both Washington and British Columbia formations, with the majority of specimens being disarticulated wings, while the only semi-complete body fossil is from McAbee. Of the described species a total of six are from McAbee and housed in British Columbian institutions. The holotype "F-1052", Paratype 5 "F-1140", and Paratype 7 "F-1044" are included in the Thompson Rivers University collections. Paratype 8 RBCM P1547, Paratype 9 RBCM P1548 and additional material RBCM P1549 were all collected by John Leahy before being donated to the Royal British Columbia Museum collections. The remaining eleven specimens are all housed in the Stonerose Interpretive center collections and donated over a period from 1994 to 2017 from both the "Corner lot" and "Boot Hill" sites. The species was named for Shay Hoban who found "paratype 3", SR 94-05-22 A,B, on 15 May 1994, which was the first instance of an O. hobani fossil being found and donated.

The general coloration is of the basal 2/5s of the wing is hyaline, while the apical 3/5 is mostly darkened. In the darkened region there is a light to hyaline "u-shaped" window placed so its midpoint is aligned with the midpoint between pterostigma and nodus. The light facia extends almost to the hind margin in some specimens and all the way across the wing in others. While similarly placed, the window is wider and extends much further than those on O. beardi, O. dorrellae, O. lochmum, O. threadgillae, all of which are between 1/3 to 1/2 as wide. Coloration of O. angustum is the most similar, but the holotype differs in venation in the preserved areas. O. hobani is most easily separated from O. worleyae, where the wing is lightly colored across the entire membrane, and O. liquetoalatum where the wing is hyaline across the entire membrane.

Due to the uniformity of the wing coloration, Archibald and Cannings decided to treat the known specimens as all males. This was based on the frequency of sexually dimorphic color patterning in zygopteran species, and thus, having one male present in the group, they opted to take a conservative position on gender of the fossils. They did note that variation in forewing and hindwing coloration is also seen in zygopterans, but they did not consider it present in O. hobani due to "paratype 7" #F-1044. In F-1044 the forewings and hindwings are articulated, and both have the same color patterning. Conversely, Archibald and Cannings also called out the fluctuation in overall wing size within forewing specimens and hindwing specimens which they considered as a possible result of sexual dimorphism.

=== Okanagrion liquetoalatum ===
Okanagrion liquetoalatum holotype

One of the "Boot Hill" site Republic species, Okanagrion liquetoalatum is only known from the holotype wing. The wing was recovered on 29 April 2006 by Gregg Wilson and subsequently donated to the Stonerose Interpretive Center collections as "SR 06-69-17 A&B". The species name liquetoalatum was created by Archibald and Cannings as a combination of the Latin words liquet meaning clear, and alatus meaning "winged".

As with many of the other species known only from disarticulated wings, the sex and position of the O. liquetoalatum wing is undetermined, though the wing is noted to be curved above the petiole and rather straight between pterostigma and nodus. The wing has a total length of 30.5 mm (1.20 in), broken down to 25.2 mm (0.99 in) from arculus to apex and 20.3 mm (0.80 in) from the nodus to apex. At the widest point the oval shaped wing is 8.5 mm (0.33 in) across. The overall arculus to apex length divided by width ratio is distinct, with five species having a greater length to width ratio, and O. angustum being narrower. In outline O. liquetoalatum is most similar to O. hobani but they differ on a number of vein and cell characters, as well as coloration.

The species is also distinguishable from all other members of Okanagrion in having a fully hyaline wing membrane, counter to the other species where light and dark color-patterning is present, or the full wing is darkened.

=== Okanagrion lochmum ===
Okanagrion lochmum is known from only the holotype specimen, "RBCM 11799.001" of the Royal British Columbia Museum which was collected from the Hoodoo face beds of McAbee by John Leahy. Archibald and Cannings created the species name "lochmum" from the Greek "Λόχμη", anglicized to lóchmi which means thicket as a reference to the amount of dense crossveins found on the wing. Based on the straight front margin between nodus and pterostigma combined with a deeply curving rear margin, the wing is likely a hindwing. The coloration is described by Archibald and Cannings as "like that of O. beardi". The basal area is hyaline and the apical area is darkened with a clear to lighter tone fascia extending in a narrower stripe than seen in O. hobani most of the way across the wing width.

The wing has a pterostigma to nodus length of 15.4 mm (0.61 in) and a maximum width of 8.5 mm (0.33 in). The wing is missing the apical most area, thus due to the incomplete nature of the wing, a full length estimate was not given and the nodus position was estimated to be approximately 28% apical from the wing base. The pterostigma is three times longer than wide, being approximately 5.5 cells long and with oblique basal and apical ends. Unlike O. hobani the major veins are less deeply curved close to the apex where they are preserved. The cells in the apical region of O. lochmum are more densely packed then in any other Okanagrion species besides O. angustum.

=== Okanagrion threadgillae ===
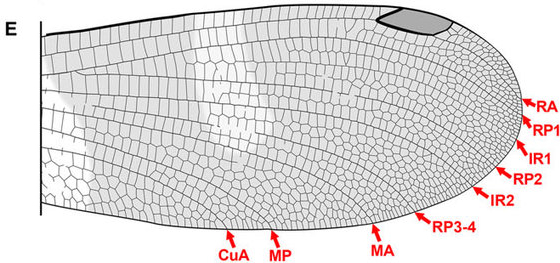
Okanagrion threadgillae illustration of venation

Found at the "Corner Lot" site A0307 on 8 April 1998, the holotype of Okanagrion threadgillae was Stonerose Interpretive Center specimen "SR 98-12-10". Archibald and Cannings designated it as the type species of the genus, and named the species threadgillae in recognition of finder Carolyn Threadgill. The specimen has both a presumed forewing and hindwing.

The presumed forewing is wide-oval in outline above the nodus region with the line of symmetry centered on the longitudinal line. The total wing length is 30.5 mm (1.20 in), 27.6 mm (1.09 in) from arculus level to apex, and a length of 16.5 mm (0.65 in) between the nodus and pterostigma. The total width is 9.0 mm (0.35 in). The other wing has a more curved rear margin and straighter nodus to pterostigma features that are deemed distinct to Okanagrion hindwings by Archibald and Cannings. Its a total of 26.5 mm (1.04 in) from arculus to apex, with a nodus to pterostigma distance of 15.7 mm (0.62 in), and a width of 8.5 mm (0.33 in). While in the forewing the nodus is placed about 26% of the distance up from the wing base, in the hind wing the nodus is more apically placed at 30% distance. The pterostigma on both wings are longer than wide, being 3.5 times longer than wide. While the forewing pterostigma is five cells long, however, the hindwing pterostigma is six cells long. Similarly the hindwing CuA–A space is six cells wide, while the forewing CuA–A space is only five cells.

O. threadgillae wings are distinguished from O. beardi and O. dorrellae by the positioning of the MP and CuA veins when they terminate on the apical margin region. For O. threadgillae the two are placed subparallel to each other while O. beardi has a wide space between them, and in O. dorrellae the space is widening. The wings are narrower than O. dorrellae but wider than O. angustum. The wing of O. liquetoalatum has a smaller length to width ratio than that of O. threadgillae, with arculus through apex/width ratios being 2.6 and 3.1 respectively.

Both forewing and hindwing have a very similar color patterning, which is similar to the general coloration of all other species besides O. liquetoalatum and O. worleyae which are fully hyaline and darkened respectively. The wings are hyaline in the basal 2/5ths region and then darkened for the apical 3/5ths. Within the darkened area is a lighter fascia between the nodus and pterostigma, crossing from the front margins to about midway across the wing. The coloration differs from other species with patterning in that the light window is narrower or shorter in depth. In O. angustum and O. hobani the light window is three times wider and extends nearly to or all the way to the hind margin. The width of O. beardi, O. dorrellae, and O. lochmum are all closer in width, though still wider, and while O. dorrellae is similar in extent across, the other two have windows that extend much closer to the rear margin.

=== Okanagrion worleyae ===
O. worleyae holotype

Okanagrion worleyae is one of the species endemic to Republic, with three described fossils having been recovered from 1998 to 2016. The holotype, "SR 99-14-02", and paratype 1, "SR 16-006-001", were both recovered from the "Corner lot" while paratype 2, "SR 11-21-09" came from the "Boot hill" site. The earliest found and most complete, the holotype was discovered on 23 August 1998 by Providence Worley. The second specimen to be found was paratype 2 donated to Stonerose on 2 August 2008 by Eric Blumhagen, and the most recently found was paratype 1, found on 9 October 2016 by Kattia Rojas. Of the Okanagrion species, only O. hobani has also been found at two Klondike Mountain Formation outcrops. As they did with other species in the genus Archibald and Cannings named the species for Providence Worley in recognition of her contribution to science.

The species is most distinct in that the wing membrane is lightly but uniformly darkened, though Archibald and Cannings note the specimens might appear as hyaline in some fossils. The type series wings are each incomplete, with the holotype missing the basal region up to the nodus. As preserved the specimen is 22.7 mm (0.89 in) long from nodus to apex, 18.5 mm (0.73 in) long between the pterostigma and nodus, and 7.8 mm (0.31 in) wide. The pterostigma is 3.5 times longer than wide and has a total width of seven cells. The overall wing shape distinguishes O. worleyae from all other species except O. angustum and O. dorrellae. At 4.5 mm (0.18 in) it is narrower in the nodus region than O. angustum which is 5.5 mm (0.22 in). The mostly straight MP vein of O. worleyae distinguishes it from O. dorrellae where the vein has a zig-zagged path near the margin.

=== Incertae sedis fossils ===
Archibald and Cannings noted that of the Okanagan Highlands fossils that they examined, five specimens from Republic and one fossil from McAbee were identifiable to Okanagrion. Each of the fossils are incomplete, and as such, they can't be placed into the described species, often with several possibilities presented. Burke Museum specimen "UWBM-74307" and Stonerose specimens SR 94-05-30 and "SR 11-60-17 A&B" were all collected from the "Corner Lot" site, the former two by Wesley Wehr and the latter one by Karl Volkman. Stonerose specimens "SR 06-08-18", collected by Donald Volkman, and "SR 11-51-07 A&B", collected by Dennis Vickerman are both from the "Boot Hill" site. The Royal British Columbia Museum specimen "RBCM P1550" was collected by John Leahy from Hoodoo Face beds at McAbee.

All the specimens from Republic sites are identifiable at least to any of the infuscate Okanagrion species. However "SR 11-60-17AB" and "SR 11-51-07" are too fragmentary to suggest species affinity. "SR 94-05-30" is a wing apex which can be excluded from O. lochmum based on the crossveins in the RA–RP1 space. Due to the poor preservation of "SR 06-08-18" firm placement was considered not possible, but based on the extent of the light facia, it possibly is a specimen of O. threadgillae. With "UWBM-74307", the darkening does not extend all the way to the nodus from the apex, eliminating several of the infuscate species. The most similar are O. angustum, O. beardi, and O. dorrellae but none of these species has crossveins as closely spaced as in "UWBM-74307". Lastly "RBCM P1550" is also very poorly preserved, with the closest possible species being O. hobani and O. lochmum based on the CuA–A space having either five or six cells.

== Paleobiology ==
With a limited number of body fossils, the presence of sexually dimorphic wing coloration was not determined. Archibald et al opted to consider all 17 illustrated specimens of O. hobani as male based on the similarity of the wing coloration as a result while noting that not all Zygoptera species have sexually dimorphic coloration.

Species of Okanagrion and the related Okanopteryx were noted by Archibald et al to be the dominant odonates of the Eocene Okanagan highlands forests. As with modern odonates, Okanagrion species were likely to be active daytime hunters around the lakes they were eventually entombed in. The genus is noted by Archibald and Cannings for being the most speciose dysagrionid odonate of the highlands, a situation attributed to factors driving both alpha and beta diversity in the Ypresian Okanagan region. Local scale diversity, called alpha diversity, was documented in the flora of both sites, and the insects of McAbee, with the diversity level being compared to Costa Rica's modern tropical lowlands. The beta diversity of the Okanagan highlands has also been explored based on Daniel H. Janzen's Why mountain passes are higher in the tropics hypothesis that species in temperature stable environments are less able to pass thermal barriers such as high elevation points. Building on that, Archibald et al (2013) showed higher levels of beta diversity in the Eocene Okanagan Highlands, with genera found across several sites, but frequently each site having unique species, a situation that was facilitated by mid-latitude climatic equability during the early Eocene "greenhouse world" which created thermal barriers to species.

== Paleoenvironment ==
Both the Republic and McAbee sites are part of a larger fossil site system collectively known as the Eocene Okanagan Highlands. The highlands, including the Early Eocene formations between Driftwood Canyon at the north and Republic at the south, have been described as one of the "Great Canadian Lagerstätten" based on the diversity, quality and unique nature of the paleofloral and paleofaunal biotas that are preserved. The highlands temperate biome preserved across a large transect of lakes recorded many of the earliest appearances of modern genera, while also documenting the last stands of ancient lines. The warm temperate highland floras in association with downfaulted lacustrine basins and active volcanism are noted to have no exact modern equivalents. This is due to the more seasonally equitable conditions of the Early Eocene, resulting in much lower seasonal temperature shifts. However, the highlands have been compared to the upland ecological islands in the Virunga Mountains within the Albertine Rift of the African rift valley.

The Republic and McAbee upland lake systems were surrounded by a warm temperate ecosystem with nearby volcanism. The highlands likely had a mesic upper microthermal to lower mesothermal climate, in which winter temperatures rarely dropped low enough for snow, and which were seasonably equitable. The paleoforests surrounding the lakes have been described as precursors to the modern temperate broadleaf and mixed forests of Eastern North America and Eastern Asia. Based on the fossil biotas the lakes were higher and cooler than the coeval coastal forests preserved in the Puget Group and Chuckanut Formation of Western Washington, which are described as lowland tropical forest ecosystems. Estimates of the paleoelevation range between 0.7–1.2 km (0.43–0.75 mi) higher than the coastal forests. This is consistent with the paleoelevation estimates for the lake systems, which range between 1.1–2.9 km (1,100–2,900 m), which is similar to the modern elevation 0.8 km (0.50 mi), but higher.

Estimates of the mean annual temperature have been derived from climate leaf analysis multivariate program (CLAMP) and leaf margin analysis (LMA) of the Republic and McAbee paleofloras. The CLAMP results after multiple linear regressions for Republic gave a mean annual temperature of approximately 8.0 °C (46.4 °F), with the LMA giving 9.2 ± 2.0 °C (48.6 ± 3.6 °F). CLAMP results from McAbee returned the higher 10.7 °C (51.3 °F) which was supported by the 10.4 ± 2.4 °C (50.7 ± 4.3 °F) returned from the LMA. These are lower than the mean annual temperature estimates given for the coastal Puget Group, which is estimated to have been between 15–18.6 °C (59.0–65.5 °F). The bioclimatic analysis for Republic and McAbee suggests mean annual precipitation amounts of 115 ± 39 cm (45 ± 15 in) and 108 ± 35 cm (43 ± 14 in) respectively.
