= Open Learning Institute of British Columbia =

Canadian post-secondary distance institute

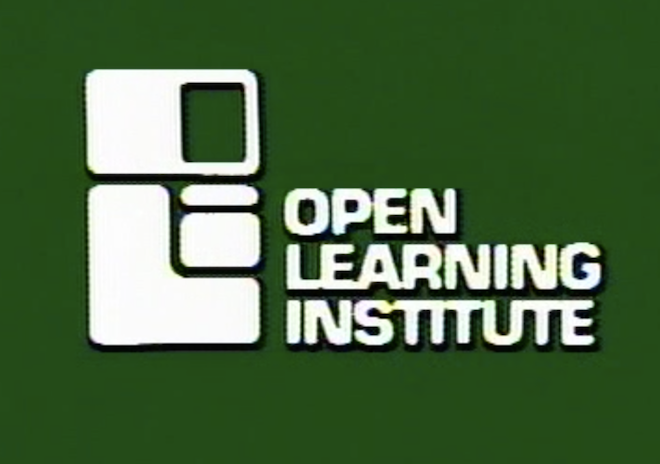
Open Learning Institute logo

The Open Learning Institute of British Columbia (OLI) was a single mode, distance education post-secondary provincial institute in Canada, created in 1978 by the Government of British Columbia. Its mandate was to improve access to higher education across the province by means of distance education and other open learning methods. Inspired in part by the UK Open University model, it used a combination of print-based courses, audiovisual media and telephone tutoring to offer courses up to the baccalaureate degree level. In 1988, it was subsumed in part as the BC Open University under the new Open Learning Agency (OLA). In 2005 it was amalgamated as the Open Learning Division with the newly designated Thompson Rivers University in Kamloops (TRU), BC. TRU was formerly known as the University College of the Cariboo.

== History ==
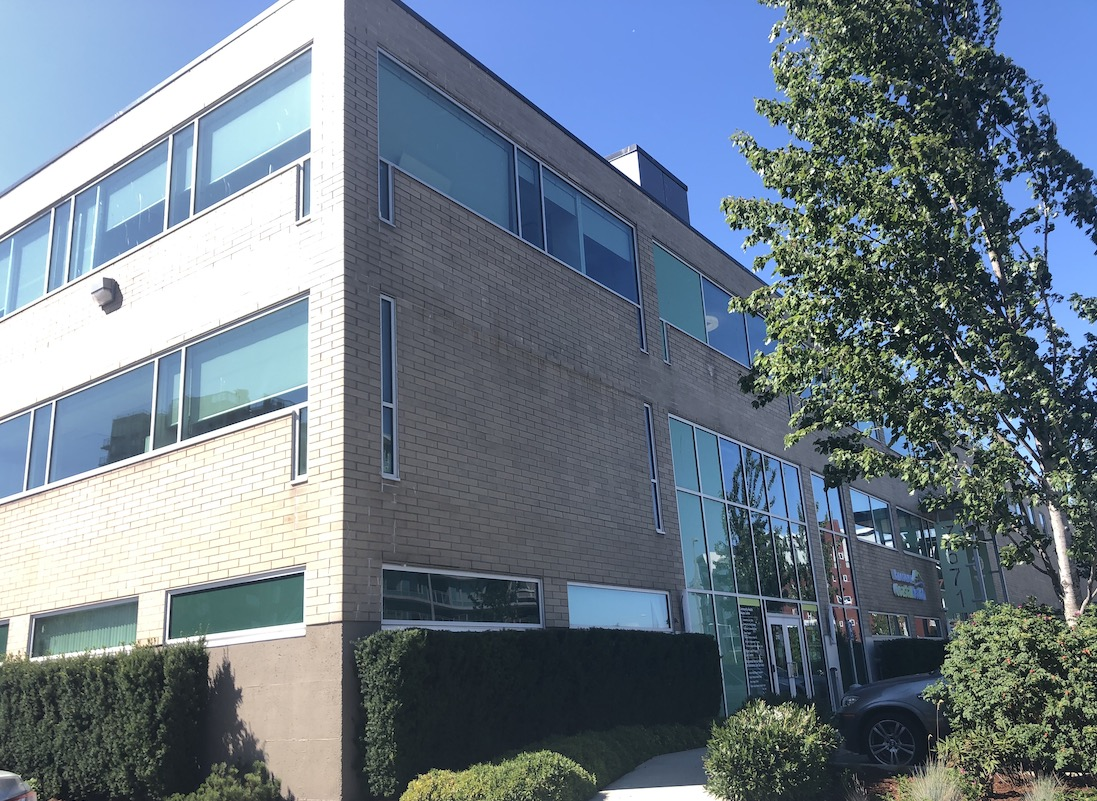
Early OLI building on Alderbridge Way in Richmond, BC

Between 1960 and 1975 in British Columbia institutions of higher education expanded from one (University of British Columbia, with an affiliated college in Victoria) and a variety of non-degree-granting institutions, to 20 institutions, with three universities, three specialized institutes and 14 community colleges. In the late 1970s the BC Minister of Education Pat McGeer commissioned a number of reports to examine the problem of lack of academic programs in the more remote areas of the province. Rather than build yet another university, this time in the interior of the province, the BC Social Credit government decided to address the need with the formation of a provincial distance education institution, the Open Learning Institute (OLI).

OLI was to offer educational programming up to the baccalaureate level in science and arts by distance education for the entire province. In addition to degrees in arts and science, OLI offered adult basic education and career, technical and vocational education, all by distance education. It also played a role in coordinating course transfers and multi-institutional consortia within BC and among the western provinces.

OLI was part of a growing effort toward increasing democratization of higher education, predicated on an open learning concept that promoted access to flexible, lifelong education with the overall goals of access to education and, by that means, social equity. Among the features of an open learning system at a post-secondary level were open admission, the use of instructional design to develop courses in teams, reliance on communications technology and media to help mediate learning, and the embracing of distance between learners and instructors as a positive factor in supporting independence in learning rather than as a deficit. Course writers and consultants were hired on a short-term contract basis to write and review courses, in place of resident faculty. Academic support for students via tele-tutoring and correspondence was also provided by contracted faculty.

In 1988, the government of British Columbia combined OLI and the Knowledge Network, British Columbia's educational television broadcast facility, to form OLA. This transition marked the end of the original Open Learning Institute, as it was reorganized as the BC Open University and BC Open College, among other components. A purpose of this restructuring was to expand the role of the new agency and its components to take on an increasingly coordinating role within the BC postsecondary system, including partnering with non-degree-granting colleges and institutes to provide pathways to baccalaureate degrees offered by OLA. In 2005 the BCOU component of OLA became part of Thompson Rivers University, which in turn was formed when the former University College of the Cariboo was granted university status by the government of British Columbia.

== Organizational structure ==
Formed under the BC Colleges and Provincial Institutes Act (1977), OLI was initially structured with an independent Board of Governors that included community and university members, selected in part for their geographical distribution around the province. John Ellis was appointed as the first Principal, seconded from the Faculty of Education at Simon Fraser University for a two-year period. The OLI program was structured under four departments: University; Adult Basic Education; Career, Technical and Vocational; and Continuing Education, intended to be delivered through educational television. After a brief stint in Burnaby OLI was relocated to a former warehouse building in Richmond, BC.

== Students ==
Between its start in 1978 to the mid '80s, course enrolments grew from 750 in the first year to over 16,000. As the organization matured, the profile of OLI students was found to be similar to that seen among most part-time and adult learners in post-secondary institutions, including those employed full-time, studying for reasons of personal interest or needs related to the workplace, with an age range of 21 to 40 years, and with women constituting a slight majority among the total number of students. Some of the challenges in supporting these learners at a distance included inadequate literacy and numeracy skills, lack of study skills, lack of confidence, isolation and life commitments outside of study.

== Academic profile ==
As a single mode institution, the Open Learning Institute's open education features included open admission and residency requirements, the implementation of a course credit bank, an international credential evaluation service, continuous entry and self-paced courses, coordination and transfer of credentials around the province, and prior learning assessment and recognition. Courses were delivered mainly in print-based course packages that were delivered through the postal services and supported by telephone tutors who maintained contact with students throughout their course studies. Course writing was undertaken by contracted disciplinary experts rather than full-time faculty, and a team of course designers was established to provide instructional design services for the courses. In addition to a media team to support course development with such elements as graphics and audio cassettes, an in-house typesetting and printing services produced complete courses that were then delivered by the postal services in print packages to students around the province and beyond.

== Impact ==
OLI faced many obstacles in its early days, ranging from poor funding and lack of acceptance by BC's universities, to misunderstanding of open education by many government officials. There was a lack of research in spite of recommendations to engage in a substantive program of academic and institutional research, particularly in distance education methods and course quality. Constraints on innovations in curriculum were exacerbated by the desire to conform with existing models used at BC's universities.

In spite of these challenges, among its contributions to the provincial educational milieu were increasing focus on collaboration within the BC system to address various career, technical and vocational needs, an educational credit bank, and a variety of new certificate and degree programs, evident in the journey from the beginning of OLI in 1978 to its place in Thompson Rivers University, Open Learning today, including some instructors (Open Learning Faculty Members) that worked in the original institute. TRU Open Learning carries on today with more than 15,000 students, and approximately 550 courses that are transferable at the post-secondary level. Programs range from high school completion to a wide range of undergraduate diplomas, certificates and degrees at the undergraduate and graduate levels. Along with open and online learning, TRU Open Learning continues and extends the OLI tradition of open learning with open admission, prior learning assessment and recognition (PLAR), an educational credit bank, and multiple transfer credit pathways.

== See also ==
- Thompson Rivers University (TRU) is BC's fourth largest provincial university and, through its Open Learning Division, one of Canada's larger open learning providers. As of April 1, 2005, British Columbia Open University (BCOU) in Burnaby, which was a service of the Open Learning Agency, became a part of the newly created Thompson Rivers University (TRU), located in Kamloops. From this date, BCOU is known as Thompson Rivers University, Open Learning.
- The Open Learning Agency (OLA) was a Crown Agency of the province of British Columbia, Canada. Its primary function was the management of the Knowledge Network, a public television station in British Columbia, the Open Learning Institute and several of its components. It once played a larger role in education and a university function, before being dissolved by the provincial government in 2004 and its divisions distributed to various institutions across the province.
