= Zacallites =

Zacallites Temporal range: Ypresian

Scientific classification
- Kingdom: Animalia
- Phylum: Arthropoda
- Clade: Pancrustacea
- Class: Insecta
- Order: Odonata
- Suborder: Zygoptera
- Family: †Zacallitidae; Cockerell, 1928
- Genus: †Zacallites; Cockerell, 1928

Extinct genus of damselflies

Zacallites is a genus of extinct damselflies in the family Zacallitidae. The genus was created for the species Zacallites balli from the Eocene Green River Formation of Colorado. Another species Zacallites cockerelli was also described from the same area in 2020.

Two Eocene Okanagan Highlands fossils from the Klondike Mountain Formation at Republic, Washington were tentatively identified as Zacallites sp. by Standley Lewis (1992). However, redescription of the fossils by S. Bruce Archibald and Robert Cannings (2021) moved specimen UWBM 72289 to the dysagrionid genus Okanagrion and specimen SCSU7B-16 to the whetwhetaksid genus Whetwhetaksa.
