= Whetwhetaksidae =

Whetwhetaksidae Temporal range: Ypresian–Rupelian
- Holotype wing

Scientific classification
- Kingdom: Animalia
- Phylum: Arthropoda
- Clade: Pancrustacea
- Class: Insecta
- Order: Odonata
- Suborder: †Cephalozygoptera
- Family: †Whetwhetaksidae; Archibald et al., 2021

Genera
- see text

Extinct family of damselflies

Whetwhetaksidae is an extinct family of cephalozygopterans in the damselfly order Odonata. The family was first described and named in 2021 with a single genus and species, while a second genus and two species were added in 2022, and a third genus and fourth species in 2025. Placement of Whetwhetaksidae within the suborder Cephalozygoptera was initially uncertain, with the suborder being defined primarily by head capsule characteristics and a few wing traits. A 2025 study of the suborder was published to determine the monophyletic nature of the group using wing character states. The study reaffirmed Cephalozygoptera as monophyletic, and placed Whetwhetaksidae in an informal, and possibly paraphyletic, "Sieblosioid Group" with the families Dysagrionidae and Sieblosiidae. A late 2025 paper, however, briefly questioned the methodology of the 2025 study, and posited without discussion the placement of Whetwhetaksidae as "Zygoptera" sensu lato. Fossils of the family are known from Ypresian sediments in western North America and in Northern Europe. Specimens from south central Asia are younger and date from Rupelian strata.

== Etymology ==
The family was named after the type, and at the time only genus, Whetwhetaksa. The genus name is formed from the nselxcin word x̌ʷətx̌ʷətaqs, which is pronounced "whetwhetaks" and in English, means 'odonate'. The word was provided for naming the fossils by Daniel Sundown Moses of the Colville Tribes and Colville Tribal Elder Aaron Carden.

== Characteristics ==
The family is defined by a series of wing characteristics due to the known fossils being incomplete, with no bodies or heads present. In the original 2021 type description for the family Archibald and Cannings set out a series of eleven features separating the known genus from all other odonates. The pterostigma was noted to be longer then seen in other zygopterid groups, having an estimated length 10 times that of the width, and the base of the pterostigma being 55–60% of the length between the nodus and apex. This character was modified in a 2022 article by Thomas J. Simonsen and others who reduced the ratio to seven times longer than wide.

An additional feature is the placement of the arculus, a crossvein near the wing base, as being nearer to the Ax1 vein then the Ax2. This feature is seen in only the South American Heliocharis amazona and a few fossil species placed in Euphaeidae. Vein also separates Whetwhetaksidae from the Dysagrioninae subfamily which has the IR2 originating at the subnodus and not midway between the arculus and nodus.

One of the criteria that Archibald and Cannings defined for Whetwhetaksidae was a wing base to nodus length comprising up to 40% of the total wing. This character state, however, was dropped a year later when the family was expanded with the description of Danowhetaksa which has a shorter base to nodus percentage. The 2022 Simonsen article deemed the character a synapomorphy of the group. A 2025 article by André Nel wrote that while Sinowhetaksa does not preserve the Ax2 region, the base to nodus length was 75%, a longer space then in the other two genera. He also noted the possibility that the basal angel and structuring of the pterostigmas in the group as a possible synapomorphy. The angle is very oblique, and it extends along the costal margin in a manner not seen in other damselfly families.

== Phylogeny ==
A 2025 article by Jessica Ware and others reviewed the larger Cephalozygoptera suborder based on key wing characters. They concluded the group as a whole to likely be monophyletic with one distinct superfamily and a likely paraphyletic informal grouping. Whetwhetaksidae was deemed monophyletic, and placed with Dysagrionidae plus Sieblosiidae in the "Sieblosioid Group". All three families have a similar structure to the "sieblosioid quadrangle", basally located cell in the wings defined by placement of the dividing veins. The placement within a monophyletic Cephalozygoptera was questioned by paleoentomologist Andre Nel based on his opinion that the phylogeny of the Ware article did not provide any defined outgroups for the phylogenetic matrix, and thus the results were to be considered as not providing of strong proof for the conclusions reached. Nel noted the Cephalozygoptera group was also being examined by Corentin Jouault and a research team, who tentatively treat Whetwhetaksidae in an expanded grouping of Zygoptera sensu lato.

The family currently contains three described genera, with a total of four described species.

- Danowhetaksa
  - D. birgitteae Simonsen, Ware, & Archibald, 2022
  - D. rusti Simonsen, Ware, & Archibald, 2022
- Sinowhetaksa
  - S. incompleta Nel in Wang et al., 2025
- Whetwhetaksa
  - W. millerae Archibald & Cannings, 2021

== Distribution ==
Fossils of Whetwhetaksidae have been found in three locations globally. Whetwhetaksa is known from early Eocene, Ypresian sediments of the Eocene Okanagan Highlands of Western North America. Both species of Danowhetaksa are from the Ypresian Ølst Formation in Denmark, while Sinowhetaksa is from the Early Oligocene Rupelian Ningming Formation of China.
