= Dicteriadidae =

Scientific classification
- Kingdom: Animalia
- Phylum: Arthropoda
- Clade: Pancrustacea
- Class: Insecta
- Order: Odonata
- Suborder: Zygoptera
- Superfamily: Polythoroidea
- Family: Dicteriadidae; Selys, 1853

Genera
- Dicterias Sélys, 1853; Heliocharis Sélys, 1853
- Distribution of Dicteriadidae

Synonyms
- Heliocharitidae Tillyard & Fraser, 1939

Family of damselflies

Dicteriadidae is a small family of damselflies in the superfamily Polythoroidea, endemic to South America. The family contains only two living species, Dicterias atrosanguinea and Heliocharis amazona, each representing a monotypic genus. Members of the family inhabit tropical forests of the Amazon Basin and surrounding regions and are notable for their slender bodies, extremely long legs and distinctive wing venation.

First recognised by Sélys in 1853, Dicteriadidae is one of the oldest family-level lineages recognised among damselflies. Although the family has been known under several different names during its taxonomic history, modern classifications recognise Dicteriadidae as a distinct South American lineage containing only the genera Dicterias and Heliocharis.

== Description ==
Dicteriadids are medium-sized damselflies with slender bodies and remarkably long legs. The wings are strongly stalked at the base and possess a distinctive venation pattern that has long separated the family from other damselfly groups. Males have simple upper anal appendages and greatly reduced lower appendages.

The family contains only two species. Heliocharis amazona is a bluish-green species with a long, expanded pterostigma that occurs throughout parts of the Amazon Basin. Dicterias atrosanguinea is a smaller reddish species with exceptionally long, slender legs, known principally from northern South America. Despite more than 170 years of study, no additional living species have been recognised, making Dicteriadidae one of the smallest damselfly families.

== Taxonomic history ==
The lineage was first recognised by Edmond de Sélys Longchamps in 1853 as the Legion Dicterias, comprising the genera Dicterias and Heliocharis. During the twentieth century, the group was treated under several different family names, including Heliocharitidae and Dicteriastidae.

Modern classifications recognise the family as Dicteriadidae, the oldest available family-group name for the lineage. The name is based on Sélys' 1853 "Legion Dicterias", which corresponds to a modern family-level taxon. During the twentieth century the group was variously referred to as Heliocharitidae, Dicteriastidae and Dicteriidae, but Dunkle (1991) concluded that Dicteriadidae is the correct family-group name under the International Code of Zoological Nomenclature.

In 2026, Carter and colleagues placed Dicteriadidae within the newly recognised superfamily Polythoroidea, together with Heteragrionidae, Hypolestidae, Mesagrionidae, Philogeniidae, Polythoridae and Rimanellidae, reflecting phylogenomic evidence for their close evolutionary relationships.

== Species ==
The following species are currently placed in Dicteriadidae:

- Dicterias atrosanguinea – red bareleg: endemic to Brazil
- Heliocharis amazona – widely distributed in South America

== Etymology ==
The family name Dicteriadidae is derived from the type genus Dicterias, with the standard zoological suffix -idae used for animal families.

The genus name Dicterias is presumably derived from the Greek δεικτηριάς (deiktērias, "female mime" or "female mimic").
