= John Suomi =

- Catcher
- Born: October 5, 1980 (age 45); Toronto, Ontario, Canada
- Bats: Left Throws: Right
- Stats at Baseball Reference

John Richard Suomi (born October 5, 1980) is a Canadian former professional baseball player.

== Career ==
Suomi attended University College of the Cariboo. The Oakland Athletics selected Suomi in the 22nd round of the 2000 MLB draft. He played in the minor league system of the Athletics through 2004, missed 2005 because of injury and then played in the organizations of the Washington Nationals, Philadelphia Phillies and Kansas City Royals.

== International career ==
Suomi played for the Canadian national baseball team in the 2013 World Baseball Classic.
