= Patrick Blennerhassett =

Canadian novelist and journalist

- Occupation: Writer

Patrick Blennerhassett is a Canadian journalist and author who currently lives in Las Vegas where he works for the Las Vegas Review-Journal as the real estate and housing reporter. His work has also appeared in such outlets as Tablet Magazine, The Guardian, The Globe & Mail, the South China Morning Post, The Seattle Times, The Chicago Tribune, Business Insider, MSN and the Miami Herald.

== Education and career ==
Blennerhassett was born in Vancouver, and raised in Kamloops, British Columbia. He is a Thompson Rivers University graduate, who also attended Langara College and Simon Fraser University.

Blennerhassett has published four novels. He was also a journalist for Business in Vancouver.

In 2007 Blennerhassett was the recipient of a Jack Webster Foundation Fellowship Award.

In 2016 Blennerhassett published a non-fiction book about Olympic field hockey player Balbir Singh Sr., which received national media coverage in Canada in a number of outlets including Maclean's and The Georgia Straight.

Blennerhassett previously worked for the South China Morning Post in Hong Kong where he covered sport and the growing intersection of sport. Some of his more notable pieces included a feature detailing how Daryl Morey's pro-Hong Kong tweet set off a firestorm in China. He also wrote about the link between Canada, Winnie the Pooh and how General Secretary of the Chinese Communist Party Xi Jinping censored images of the cartoon bear in China. He also did a video editorial that was critical of China hosting the 2022 Beijing Winter Olympics after the national security law was passed in Hong Kong as well as being critical of Hong Kong's Covid-19 lockdowns which included shutting down gyms across the city. In an interview with TYR Blennerhassett said he left Hong Kong for fear of being thrown in prison for writing articles critical of the Chinese Communist Party after the passing of the National Security Law.

In 2018 he wrote a feature article for The Guardian about a rash of deaths of men in his hometown of Kamloops.

While working for the Las Vegas Review-Journal Blennerhassett has written multiple investigative features about the Wall Street-backed ownership of Las Vegas Valley homes.

Blennerhassett is married to former UFC fighter Ramona Pascual.

== Books ==
- Monument
- Random Acts of Vandalism
- A Forgotten Legend: Balbir Singh Sr., Triple Olympic Gold & Modi's New India
- The Fatalists
