= Kamloops Museum and Archives =

Archive and museum in Kamloops, Canada

Coordinates: 50.6747°N 120.3364°W

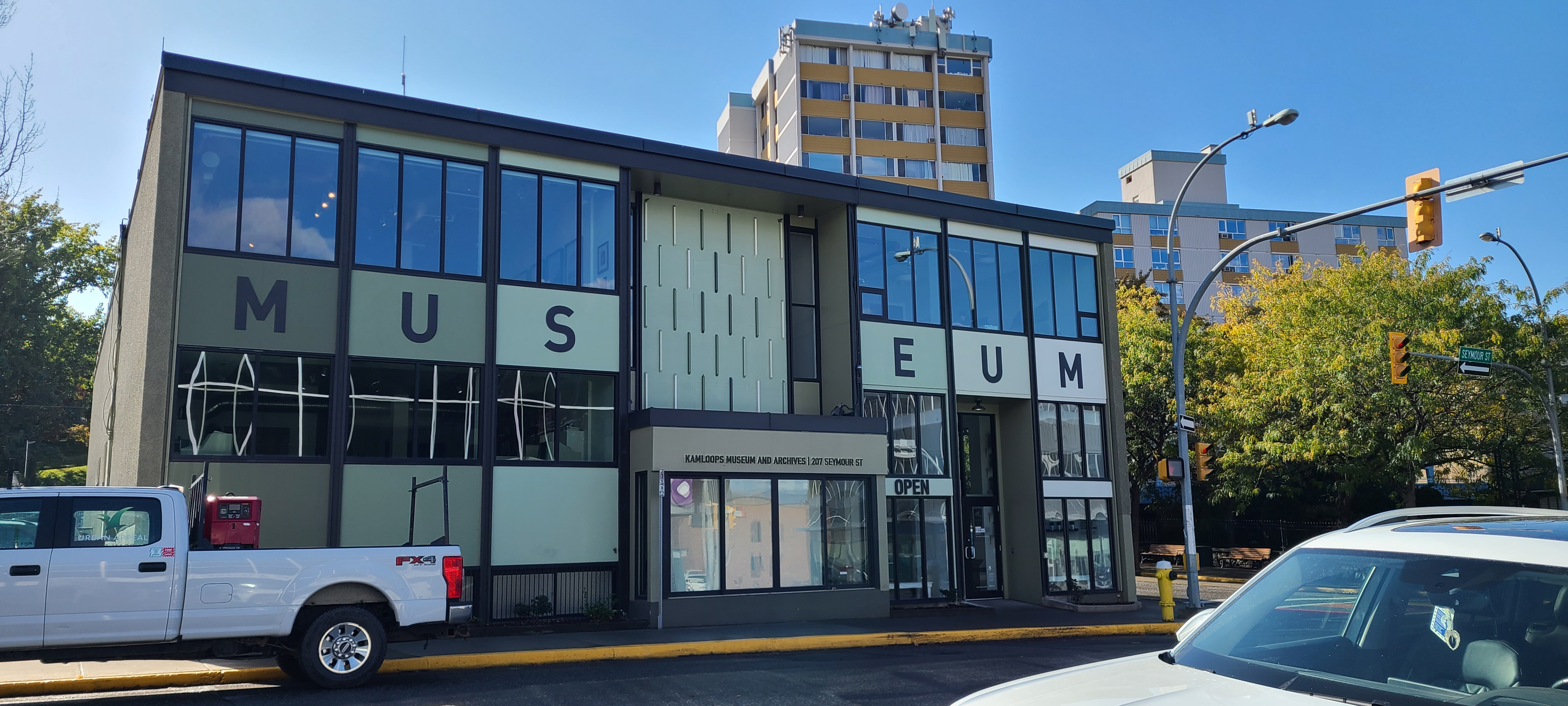
Kamloops museum and archives

The Kamloops Museum and Archives is a museum and archives located in the West End of the city of Kamloops, British Columbia, Canada. It is located at 207 Seymour Street in downtown Kamloops, at the corner of 2nd Avenue. In addition to historical exhibits and educational programmes, the facility also is home to the city's archives, including a special collection, the Mary Balf Archives, focused around the works of Mary Balf, a prolific local historian, but including a wide array of documents from the early fur trade journals onwards.

== See also ==
- Mark Sweeten Wade
- Nicola Valley Museum and Archives
- Secwepemc Museum and Heritage Park
- Fort Kamloops
