= Open Learning Agency =

- Location: British Columbia, Canada

The Open Learning Agency (OLA) was a Crown Agency of the province of British Columbia, Canada. Its primary function was the management of the Knowledge Network, a public television station in British Columbia, and the Open Learning Institute. It once played a larger role in education and a university function, before being scaled back by the provincial government in 2004.

As of April 1, 2005, British Columbia Open University (BCOU) in Burnaby, that was a service of the Open Learning Agency became a part of the newly created Thompson Rivers University (TRU), located in Kamloops. From this date, BCOU is known as Thompson Rivers University, Open Learning or TRU Open Learning (TRU-OL).

Thompson Rivers University (TRU), through its Open Learning Division (TRU-OL), became one of Canada’s leading distance education providers. Educational goals are obtainable for anyone through accessible and varied courses that can be taken anytime and at an individually determined pace. With over 400 individual courses and more than 57 programs available for completion by distance and online learning, students can take a variety of programs such as: adult secondary school completion; certificates and diplomas, including advanced and post-baccalaureate; associate degrees; and bachelor's degrees.

Knowledge Network (KN), another service of the Open Learning Agency, continues to operate as part of the Open Learning Agency, broadcasting its unique educational programming throughout British Columbia.

== See also ==
- Thompson Rivers University is BC's fourth largest provincial university and, through its Open Learning Division (Thompson Rivers University, Open Learning (TRU-OL)), is one of Canada’s leading distance education providers.

Also included is Open School BC (OSBC), currently of the Services and Technology Division in the Ministry of Education. This was the K-12 branch of OLA. As well as correspondence material they also developed the first online courses in 1998 with OSCAR (Open School Courses and Resources). Working with the Distance Education (DE) Schools of BC they purchased, developed and managed the first Learning Management System (LMS) WebCT). Now Open School BC has over 50 online courses that they offer to Distributed Learning programs and to public sector clients across the province in Blackboard and Moodle Learning Management Systems. http://www.openschool.bc.ca
