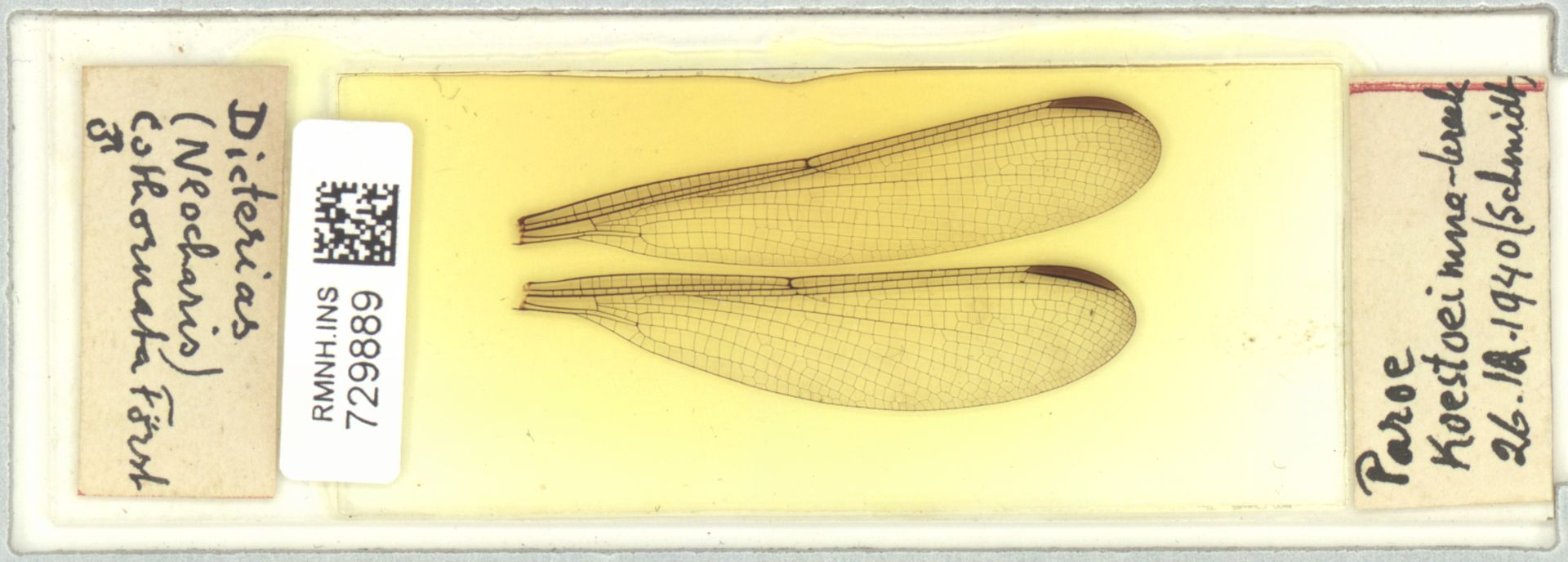

Conservation status
- Data Deficient (IUCN 3.1)

Scientific classification
- Kingdom: Animalia
- Phylum: Arthropoda
- Clade: Pancrustacea
- Class: Insecta
- Order: Odonata
- Suborder: Zygoptera
- Family: Dicteriadidae
- Genus: Dicterias; Selys, 1853
- Species: D. atrosanguinea

Binomial name
- Dicterias atrosanguinea Selys, 1853

= Dicterias =

Genus of damselflies

Dicterias is a monotypic genus of damselflies in the family Dicteriadidae. It contains the single species Dicterias atrosanguinea, which is known commonly as the red bareleg. It is endemic to Brazil. It occurs on the banks of the Amazon River.

== Etymology ==
The genus name Dicterias is derived from the Greek δεικτηριάς (deiktērias, "female mime" or "female mimic"). Dunkle (1991) suggested that Sélys may have chosen the name because he considered the genus to resemble or mimic another damselfly.
