= Heliocharis =

Scientific classification
- Kingdom: Animalia
- Phylum: Arthropoda
- Clade: Pancrustacea
- Class: Insecta
- Order: Odonata
- Suborder: Zygoptera
- Family: Dicteriadidae
- Genus: Heliocharis; Selys, 1853
- Species: H. amazona

Binomial name
- Heliocharis amazona Selys, 1853

Genus of damselflies

Heliocharis is a monotypic genus of damselflies in the family Dicteriadidae. It contains the single species Heliocharis amazona. It is native to South America, where it is distributed from Venezuela to Argentina.
