= Thompson Rivers University =

Public university in British Columbia, Canada

- Coat of arms
- Other name: TRU
- Former names: List: Cariboo College (1970–1989); The University College of the Cariboo (1989–2005)
- Motto: Secwepemctsín: T7ETSXEMÍNTE RE STSELXMÉM
- Motto in English: "To strive ahead", indicating that the journey of learning is enduring and unremitting
- Type: Public research university
- Established: October 1970; 56 years ago
- Founder: Legislative Assembly of British Columbia
- Affiliations: U Sports, AUCC, IAU, CVU, CWUAA, CBIE, CUP, Research Universities Council of British Columbia, CICan, UnivCan
- Chair: David Hallinan
- Chancellor: DeDe DeRose
- President: Airini
- Vice-president: Matt Milovick, Shannon Wagner, Baihua Chadwick
- Provost: Gordon James Binsted
- Faculty: 1,893 full-and part-time; 1,555 FTE (as of Oct. 1, 2025)
- Students: 30,449 full- and part-time; 13,358 FTE (2025-26 FTE)
- Location: Kamloops and Williams Lake, British Columbia, Canada; 50.672506°N 120.365163°W
- Campus: Urban
- Sport Teams: Thompson Rivers WolfPack
- Colours: TRU Blue; TRU Sage
- Nickname: TRU WolfPack
- Website: tru.ca

Thompson Rivers University (commonly called TRU) is a public research university in Kamloops, British Columbia, Canada. The university's name comes from the two rivers that converge in Kamloops, the North Thompson and South Thompson. TRU is one of six research universities in B.C. It is the province's only dual-sector research university—meaning it offers both academic and applied education—and offers a dual-sector education. It is British Columbia's fourth-largest university.

TRU's 250-acre main campus in Kamloops is on McGill Road in the city's southwest Sahali area. South of the city's West End, the campus has 40 acres of gardens and the largest arboretum in BC's Interior. Residences house 1,472 students on campus. Kamloops, a city of about 100,000, is in the semiarid grasslands of the Thompson-Nicola Regional District in British Columbia's southwestern Interior, on the traditional lands of the Secwépemc (Shuswap) people. TRU has a satellite campus in Williams Lake in B.C.'s Cariboo-Chilcotin region, and regional centres in 100 Mile House, Clearwater, Barriere and Lillooet.

Established as a community college in 1970, TRU has become a full-fledged research university, offering master's degrees, bachelor's degrees, associate degrees, diplomas, certificates and citations, while maintaining the trades programs that were its foundation.

The university has five academic faculties—the Faculty of Law, Faculty of Arts, Faculty of Adventure, Culinary Arts and Tourism, Faculty of Education and Social work, and Faculty of Science—and three schools: the Bob Gaglardi School of Business and Economics, the School of Nursing, and the School of Trades and Technology. The university also educates students around the world through its distance education division, TRU Open Learning (TRU-OL).

In 2023, TRU was named one of Canada's Top 50 Research Universities, and as of 2025 is one of 16 universities worldwide with a Platinum rating from the Association for the Advancement of Sustainability in Higher Education.

== History ==
=== Founding and early development ===
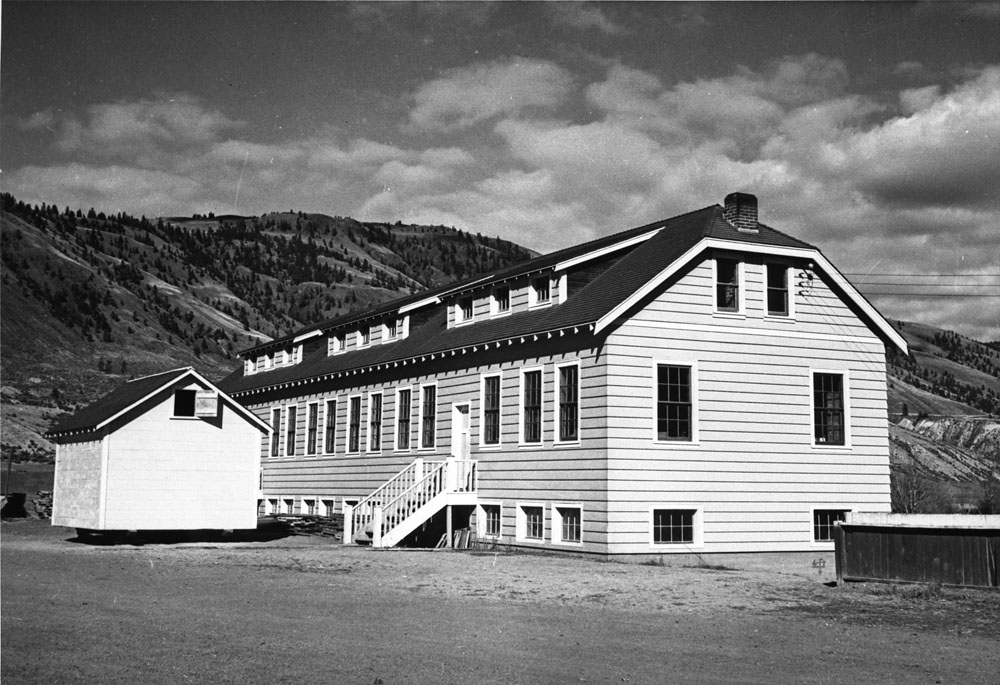
Classroom of the Kamloops Indian Residential School

In 1970, the Government of British Columbia selected Kamloops as the site for one of several new two-year regional colleges intended to provide post-secondary education outside the major urban centers of Vancouver and Victoria. Cariboo College began operations in September 1970, accommodating 367 full-time and 200 part-time students in facilities at the Kamloops Indian Residential School during its inaugural year.

The college offered two-year academic programs that allowed students to transfer to the University of British Columbia (UBC), Simon Fraser University (SFU), and the University of Victoria (UVic). Simultaneously, the college developed vocational training programs to address the needs of regional industries including forestry and mining. The vocational division, now known as the School of Trades and Technology, was established after the college relocated to its newly constructed campus on McGill Road in September 1971. Premier W.A.C. Bennett officially inaugurated the vocational wing in May 1972. Following provincial mandate, Cariboo merged with the Kamloops Vocational School in 1974 to provide comprehensive training for in-demand occupations in the Kamloops region.

In 1978, Cariboo College received official designation as a college with corporate status under the British Columbia Colleges and Provincial Institutes Act, gaining an independent board separate from the previously governing school boards. The same legislation created the Open Learning Institute (OLI), which would later evolve into TRU Open Learning, to deliver academic and vocational training by distance throughout the province to people unable to access traditional post-secondary education due to geographic isolation or other limitations. The following year, the Universities Act empowered OLI to grant baccalaureate degrees in arts or science under its own authority.

Throughout its first two decades, the college experienced significant growth. The faculty increased from 30 members serving 567 students in 1970 to 383 employees (259 full-time and 124 part-time) serving 5,252 students (3,047 full-time and 2,205 part-time). To accommodate this expansion, Cariboo College constructed more than a dozen new facilities, developed an on-campus student housing complex, and renovated existing buildings. In 1971, the college established a satellite campus in Williams Lake, British Columbia, 285 kilometers north of Kamloops, offering educational programs to surrounding communities, including remote Indigenous populations. In 1985, the Williams Lake campus relocated to a 55,000 square-foot facility on Hodgeson Road, which would later close due to seismic safety concerns.

=== University College transition ===
In 1989, Cariboo College was among three colleges selected by the provincial government to transition to "university college" status, enabling the provision of degree programs in regional centers. Cariboo's initial five bachelor's degrees—Arts, Science, Education, Business Administration, and Nursing—were developed and granted under the supervision of British Columbia's established universities: UBC, SFU, and UVic.

When the first cohort graduated with these degrees in June 1991, the institution was renamed the University College of the Cariboo (UCC). The College and Institute Amendment Act of January 1995 granted UCC the authority to independently confer degrees. The subsequent decade saw the introduction of several new programs, including five additional bachelor's degrees and the Adventure Guide Diploma. Construction continued throughout the 1990s, notably the 53,000 square-foot Campus Activity Centre, completed as a cost-recovery-based joint project between UCC and the student society following a 1990 legislative change that permitted the college to secure private financing for development.

UCC began offering master's degree programs in collaboration with UBC and SFU in 2002, gaining the authority to independently grant applied master's degrees in 2003.

=== University era ===
In 2004, the Government of British Columbia announced that UCC would become the province's newest university. In March 2005, Thompson Rivers University was officially incorporated under the Thompson Rivers University Act. This legislation merged the University College of the Cariboo with the BC Open University and other components of the Open Learning Agency, transforming UCC's university council into a senate and establishing a planning council for Open Learning. Dr. Roger Barnsley, UCC's president, continued in his leadership role at the new institution. As mandated by the Thompson Rivers University Act, the university's purposes include:

- Offering baccalaureate and master's degree programs
- Providing post-secondary and adult basic education and training
- Undertaking and maintaining research and scholarly activities
- Providing an open learning educational credit bank for students

TRU held its inaugural convocation on March 31, 2005, along with the installation of its first chancellor, Nancy Greene Raine. Prime Minister Paul Martin visited the university the following day, becoming TRU's first official visitor. The Master of Business Administration program, TRU's first autonomous master's degree, launched in September 2005. Campus infrastructure continued to expand with the opening of the 580-room TRU Residence and Conference Centre in 2006. In 2007, the Williams Lake campus relocated to Western Avenue, and all Open Learning operations (TRU-OL) transferred from Burnaby to the new BC Centre for Open Learning building on the Kamloops campus. Dr. Kathleen Scherf became TRU's second president in 2008 but was dismissed by the board of governors in 2009. Roger Barnsley returned as interim president for two years during the search for Scherf's replacement. Dr. Alan Shaver was installed as TRU's third president in 2011, coinciding with the installation of the Honourable Wally Oppal as chancellor. That same year, the university gained membership to the Research Universities Council of British Columbia in 2011. Also in 2011, the Brown Family House of Learning opened as TRU's first LEED Gold-certified building, initially housing the TRU Faculty of Law—the first new law school established in Canada in over 30 years. The Faculty of Law relocated to a 44,000-square-foot space in the renovated Old Main building in December 2013, with its first graduating class celebrating convocation in June 2014.

=== Challenges ===
In February 2021, several current and former TRU staff filed complaints alleging anti-Indigenous racism, sexual harassment and bullying within the institution. Vice-presidents Matt Milovick and Larry Phillips were accused of creating a toxic workplace environment. A comprehensive investigation was initiated in fall 2021, with Larry Phillips subsequently departing the university for unrelated reasons, while Matt Milovick remained in his position. By early 2022, faculty and staff expressed public concerns about the investigation process. The TRU Faculty Association passed a vote of non-confidence in the leadership of President Brett Fairbairn and Board Chair Marilyn McLean.

On January 17, 2023, TRU released a heavily redacted report from its investigation that substantiated 10 allegations. Less than a month later, Vice-President Administration and Finance Matt Milovick filed a defamation lawsuit against his accusers. In April 2023, former Vice-President Human Resources Larry Phillips initiated legal action against Fairbairn.

In June 2023, the university announced that Fairbairn would step down in 2025. A less-redacted version of the investigation report was provided by TRU in March 2024.

=== Recent developments ===
In April 2024, TRU and the BC Wildfire Service announced the establishment of North America's first dedicated wildfire training and education centre, designed to offer comprehensive training programs and develop academic diplomas and degrees in wildfire management and emergency response disciplines.

In November 2024, TRU published its 'Strategic Internationalization Plan 2025–2035,' titled 'Nek'úsem-kt: We are One Community.' The plan establishes a framework for integrating global dimensions into the university's curriculum, research, and campus culture over the next decade. Following approval by the Senate and Board of Governors in February 2025, the plan outlines four strategic goals: enhancing global competencies through institutional learning outcomes, providing support services for international learners, expanding Indigenous engagement within internationalization efforts, and promoting global research collaborations. According to university administrators, the plan resulted from consultations with over 1,500 stakeholders, including students, faculty, staff, and Indigenous partners.

== Governance ==
Governance at TRU follows a tripartite structure established by provincial legislation in the University Act and the Thompson Rivers University Act:

1. Board of Governors: Responsible for budgetary, operational, and administrative matters
2. Senate: Makes decisions on academic matters including curriculum, credentials, admissions, and educational policies
3. Planning Council for Open Learning: Oversees academic matters relating to the Open Learning Division

The University Act also defines the leadership structure of the university, including the powers, duties, and offices of the president. The president holds the positions of vice-chancellor, board member, and senate chair while serving as the chief executive officer responsible for supervising administrative and academic operations. The president's executive team includes:

- Provost and Vice-president Academic
- Vice-president Administration and Finance
- Vice-president University Relations
- Vice-president International
- Vice-president Research
- Associate Vice-president Marketing and Communications
- Executive Director Indigenous Education

As of 2026, the president is the singularly named Airini.

== Academics ==
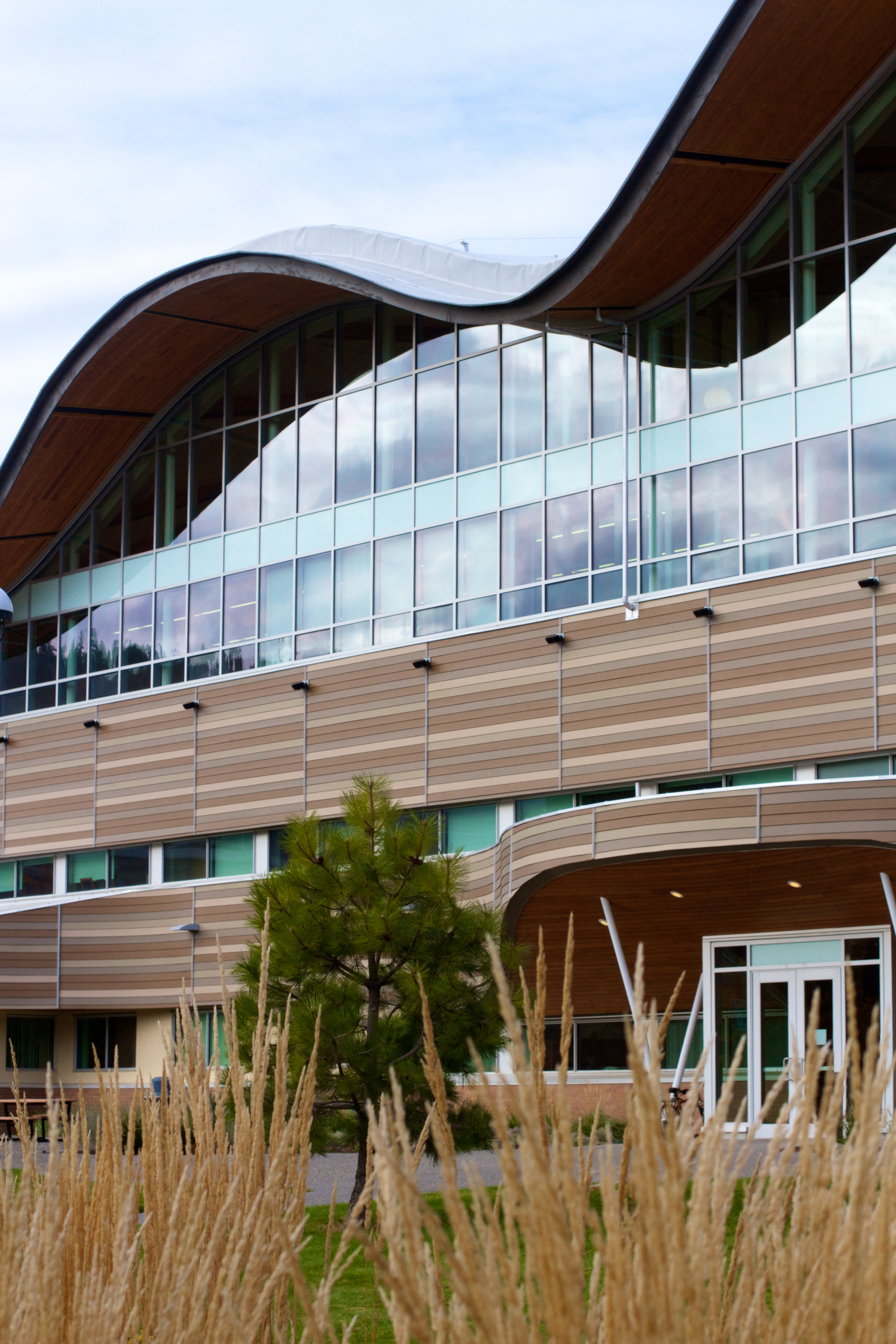
Old Main

TRU offers approximately 140 on-campus programs and 60 distance or online programs through its Open Learning Division, organized within the following faculties and schools:

- Faculty of Adventure, Culinary Arts and Tourism
- Faculty of Arts
- Bob Gaglardi School of Business and Economics
- Faculty of Education and Social Work
- Faculty of Law
- School of Nursing
- Faculty of Science
- Faculty of Student Development
- School of Trades and Technology

The university also operates two specialized divisions:

- Open Learning: Providing distance, online, and blended learning options across all faculties and schools
- TRU World: Serving international and study abroad students

== Campuses ==
TRU's 250-acre main campus in Kamloops is situated on McGill Road in the city's southwest Sahali area, overlooking the junction of the North and South Thompson rivers from which the university takes its name. Located above the West End, the campus has 40 acres of gardens and the largest arboretum in BC's Interior. Residences provide on-campus housing for 1,472 students. Kamloops, a city of about 110,000 people, is located in the semi-arid grasslands of the Thompson-Nicola region of British Columbia's southwestern Interior, on the traditional lands of the Secwépemc (Shuswap) people. TRU has a satellite campus in Williams Lake in BC's Cariboo-Chilcotin region, and regional centres in 100 Mile House, Clearwater, Barriere, Ashcroft and Lillooet.

=== Kamloops ===
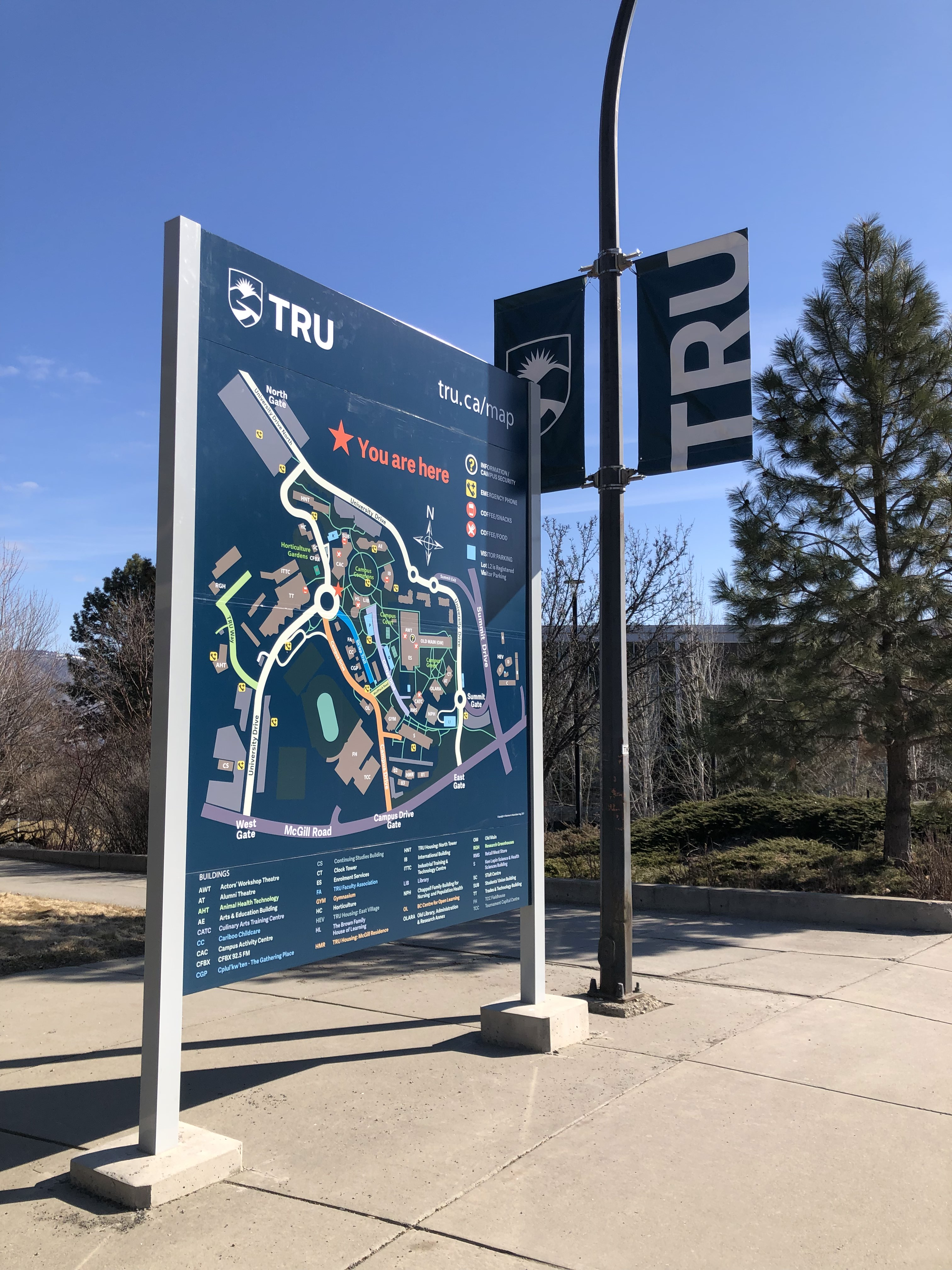
Campus map

After one year operating out of the school district's various facilities, such as the Kamloops Indian Residential School property, Cariboo College moved to the current campus on McGill Road in September 1971, sharing the newly constructed Main building with the Kamloops Vocational School. Much of the campus had been part of a Canadian Navy munitions base and several of the officers' quarters were put to use and remain as heritage buildings on today's campus.

Construction was a constant on Cariboo College's campus to meet the needs of a rapidly expanding student body. The Library and Gymnasium opened in fall of 1976. The Science building was completed in 1980 and the Visual Arts building opened the following year. Construction began on student residences in 1988 and Hillside Stadium opened. The next year saw the completion of the Clock Tower building and Alumni Theatre, and the addition of a second storey on the Main building's B block for classroom and bookstore space.

As part of Cariboo's application to become a university college in 1989, the first campus plan was developed with the requirement that every building have an official name. Without a single faculty or function to identify it, the 18-year-old Main or Main block building, as the oldest and most central building on campus, officially became Old Main when Cariboo College became the University College of the Cariboo.

Construction in the 1990s continued as the influx of undergraduate students kept growing. UCC doubled the size of the Library and Science buildings and opened the Computer Access Centre downtown on Victoria Street in 1991. The Arts and Education (A&E) building was built in two phases from 1991 to 1993. Beside A&E, the 53,000-square-foot Campus Activity Centre, which includes the campus bookstore, a cafeteria, pub, retail spaces, meeting rooms and the student union office and coffee shop, opened in 1993 thanks to a cost-recovery-based joint proposal between UCC and the student society. This was able to happen after a change in legislation in 1990 allowed the college to borrow money privately for development.

Also in 1993, UCC opened a new campus daycare facility, the Hillside Stadium track house, the Williams Lake campus extension, a regional centre in Ashcroft and the Wells Gray Education and Research Centre. The facilities at UCC, next door to the city's new Canada Games Pool, were integral to Kamloops hosting the 1993 Canada Summer Games. More regional centres opened in Merritt and Lillooet in 1994, and the Trades and Technology Centre was completed in 1997. The International Building opened in 2002 to house the growing international education department (now known as TRU World).

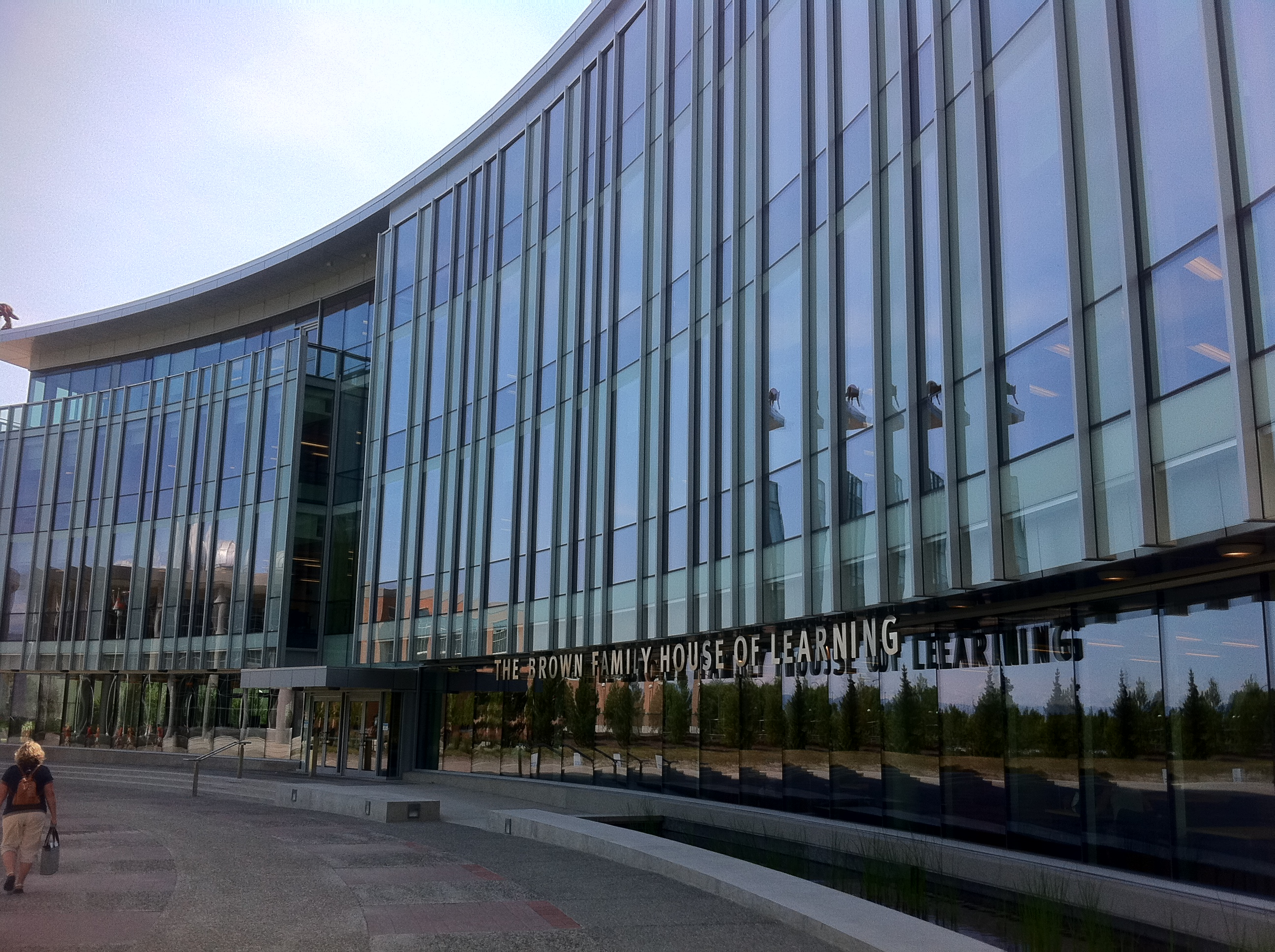
The Brown Family House of Learning

The Brown Family House of Learning building opened in 2011, housing TRU's library and a learning commons. It was the first TRU building to be awarded Leadership in Energy and Environmental Design (LEED) Gold status for sustainable construction. Its adjoining theatre-in-the-round has a ceiling made of pine-beetle-killed pine wood and a green roof in a design modelled after an Interior Salish pit house.

Old Main, the first building constructed on the Kamloops campus, was partly renovated and expanded in 2013 and it got a second phase of upgrades in 2021. The TRU Faculty of Law moved into the 44,000-square-foot addition in December 2013 and officially launched the space to coincide with convocation of its first graduating class in June 2014. The renovation won several awards, including an Honour Award of Excellence for 2014 from the Society for College and University Planning and the American Institute of Architects.

The Industrial Training and Technology Centre (ITTC) opened in September 2018 at a cost of $30 million. The 5,344-square-metre building positions the School of Trades and Technology and Faculty of Science to meet student and labour-market demand. There is space designed for new programs on campus, including industrial process technician, power engineering, HVAC/refrigeration technician, and machinist. The two-storey centre features classrooms, lab and shop areas, and it connects to the adjacent Trades and Technology building via a covered walkway. As some programs move from the Trades and Technology building to the ITTC, the Faculty of Science's Architectural and Engineering Technology (ARET) program takes its place in renovated spaces, leading to growth opportunities for ARET, including expansion to a fourth year. The changes made possible by the new building enable collaboration, applied research and training spanning the sciences and engineering disciplines.

The Chappell Family Building for Nursing and Population Health opened in 2020, with a total cost of $37.2 million. The Province of BC contributed $8 million. The building is a 4,550-square-metre facility encompassing classrooms, patient simulation labs, interdisciplinary health clinics, home-care space, student lounges and breakout rooms.

Most recently, the Ken Lepin Science Building — which is home to sciences, health sciences and nursing — has undergone a major renovation in 2023.

Thompson Rivers University Buildings
Building name	Adjacent road	Primary usage	Description
Old Main	Campus Drive	Academic	Built in 1970, one of the oldest buildings on campus. Underwent energy retrofits in 2009–2011 including solar hot water heating, motion sensors, and HVAC improvements.
Campus Activity Centre	Campus Drive	Student Services	Constructed in 1992, it is the fourth largest building on campus. Features solar hot water heating and underwent various energy retrofits. The Independent Centre addition was built to LEED Gold standards.
International Building	Campus Drive	Academic	Built in 2005, one of the newer buildings on campus. Upgraded under BC Hydro's Continuous Optimization Program with HVAC scheduling software and motion sensor lighting.
Arts and Education	Campus Drive	Academic	Constructed in 1991. Energy retrofits include high-efficiency lighting, HVAC controls, and motion-sensored lighting. Enrolled in BC Hydro's Continuous Optimization program.
Clock Tower	University Drive	Academic	Built in 1990. Features include demand-controlled ventilation systems and improved ventilation scheduling aligned with building occupancy.
Culinary Arts Training Centre	College Drive	Academic	Built in 1970, underwent significant retrofits including a major lighting upgrade in 2012. First building in North America to use Wireless Energy Management System installed in 2012.
BC Centre for Open Learning	Campus Drive	Academic/Administrative	Constructed in 2007. Features a waste energy capture system that uses heat from computer servers to heat the building. Achieves significant energy savings through various retrofits.
OLARA (Old Library, Administration & Research Annex)	Campus Drive	Administrative	Built in 1975. Retrofits include energy-efficient lighting, occupancy sensors, and HVAC controls.
Trades and Technology	Campus Drive	Academic	Constructed in 1997. Features occupancy sensors for dust collection systems and specialized ventilation systems for welding areas.
Science Building	Campus Drive	Academic	Constructed in 1980. Features include HVAC controls, energy-efficient lighting, and variable-frequency drives to adjust airflow based on occupancy.
Brown Family House of Learning	Campus Drive	Library/Academic	Features a green roof, water-efficient landscaping, showers for bikers, and 75% of lighting provided by natural light. Built to LEED Gold standards.

=== The Reach ===
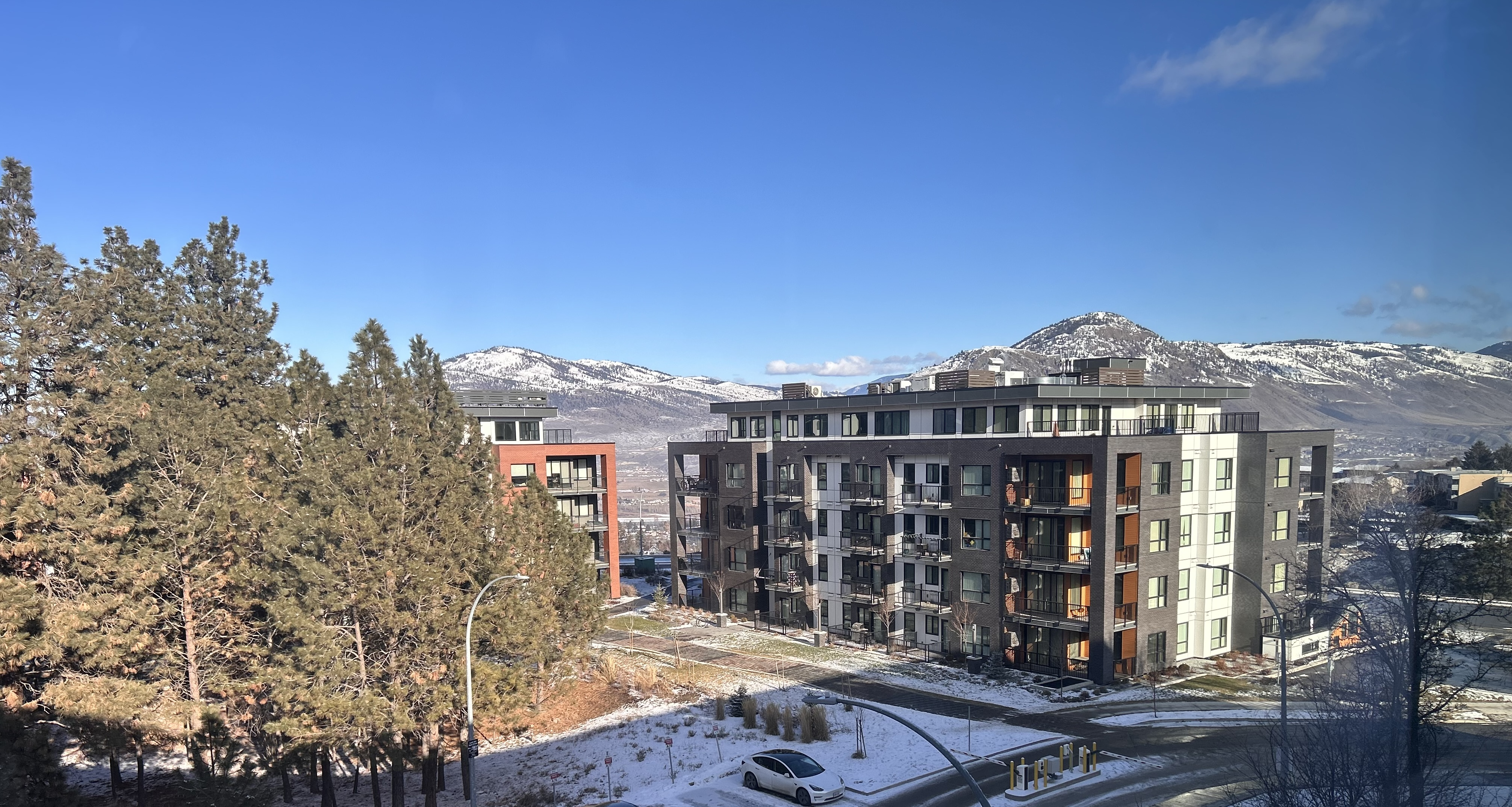
Liberty Pointe Apartments, Thompson Rivers University

TRU completed a Campus Master Plan in 2013, which set out future development of the Kamloops campus using a "university village" model. The project is known as The Reach. The goal is to develop 90 acres on campus in six phases with a total build out of 46,600 square feet of retail space, 40,000 square feet of office space and 3,500 residential units. Some of the residential projects have been completed, including Legacy Square and Liberty Pointe by the Kelson Group and Creston House by the Cape Group. Under current provincial post-secondary risk management policies in British Columbia, TRU cannot directly control the project. As such, TRU created a corporate trustee, TRU Community Trust, as a vehicle for the development to progress but remain at arm's length from the university.

== Alumni ==
- Patrick Blennerhassett, journalist and author
- Corryn Brown, curler
- Kamar Burke, basketball player
- Craig Coolahan, politician
- Andrew G. Cooper, theatre creator, filmmaker and producer
- Alan Corbishley, baritone singer, stage director
- Jim Cotter (curler)
- Dr. Bruce Damer, astrobiologist, designer and author
- Bradley Gunter, volleyball player
- Steven Galloway, novelist
- Dezaray Hawes, curler
- Daniel Hayes, actor, model, and boxer
- Catalina Ontaneda, former Ecuadorian Minister for Sport
- John Gordon Perrin, volleyball player
- Lynda Price, chief of the Ulkatcho First Nation
- Jaye Simpson, Oji-Cree/Saulteaux indigiqueer writer, poet, activist, and drag queen
- John Suomi, baseball player
- Kevin Tillie, gold-medal winning Olympic and professional volleyball player
- Phyllis Webstad, Indigenous activist and author who created Orange Shirt Day

== See also ==
- List of universities in British Columbia
- Higher education in British Columbia
- Education in Canada
- Canadian university scientific research organizations
- Open Learning Institute of British Columbia
- Open Learning Agency
