= Sydney Morgan Eveleigh =

English architect

- Born: 1870; Bedford, England
- Died: 1947 (aged 76–77); Vancouver, British Columbia, Canada
- Education: Bedford Modern School
- Occupation: Architect

Sydney Morgan Eveleigh (1870–1947) was an English architect particularly associated with the urban development of Vancouver in the early decades of the twentieth century. With Noble Hoffar and William Dalton, and then subsequently in sole practice, he was responsible for numerous commercial, residential and institutional buildings in the City. He was also active in Vancouver's civic affairs and was instrumental in the establishment of the Carnegie Library in the city.

== Early life ==
Eveleigh was born in Bedford, England on 24 September 1870, the son of Robert Eveleigh. He was educated at Bedford Modern School and also received instruction in architecture from Rev. Frederick Croxall Boultbee, then Vicar of Melchbourne. Boultbee had relatives in Vancouver, and through them Eveleigh managed to secure a position in the Vancouver office of Noble S. Hoffar in May 1888. He returned to England for two years of further study before once again resuming practice in Vancouver this time with William Dalton in 1895, with whom he went into partnership from 1902.

== Work ==
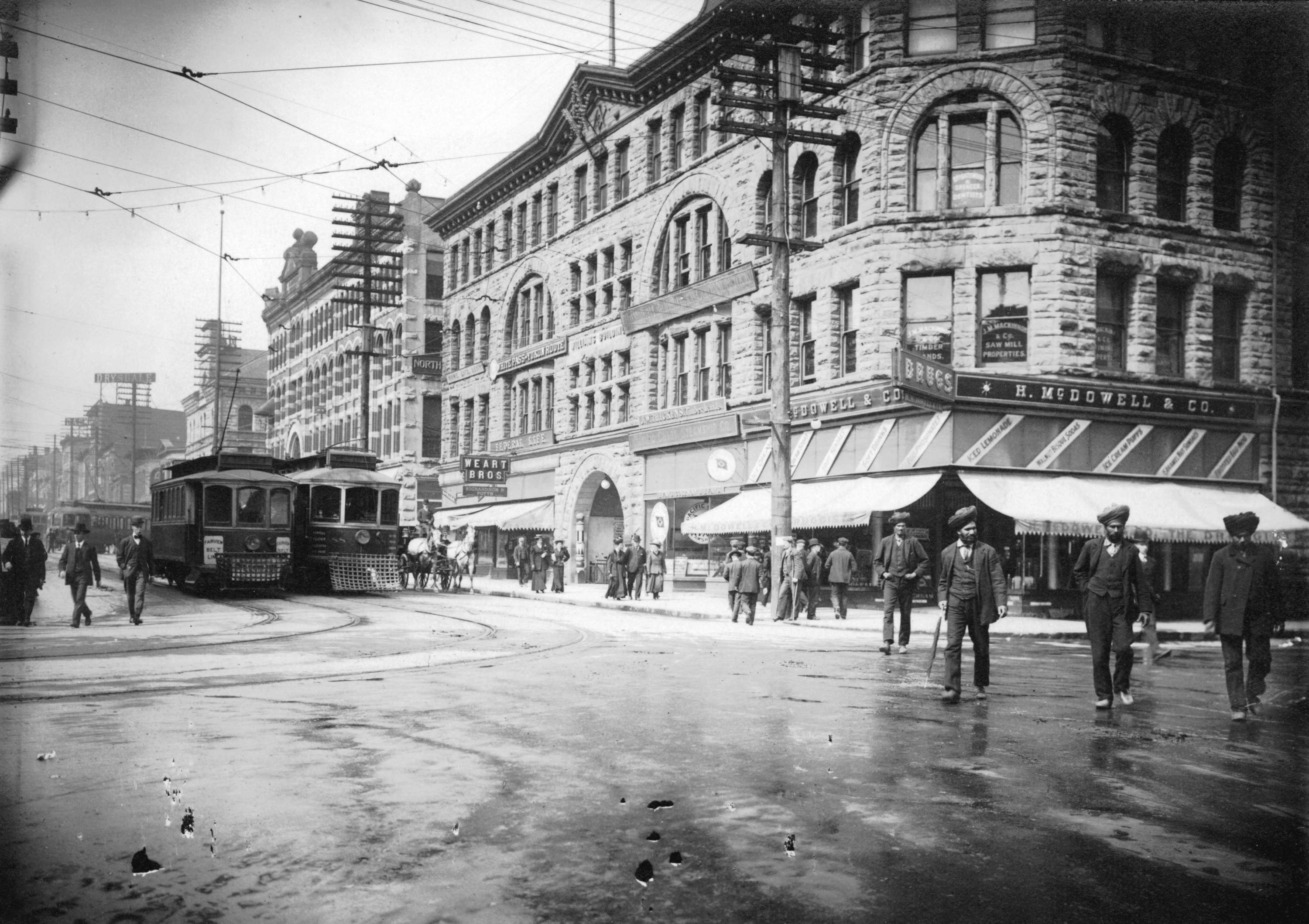
Streetcars passing at the 400 Block of Granville Street, Vancouver, in 1908

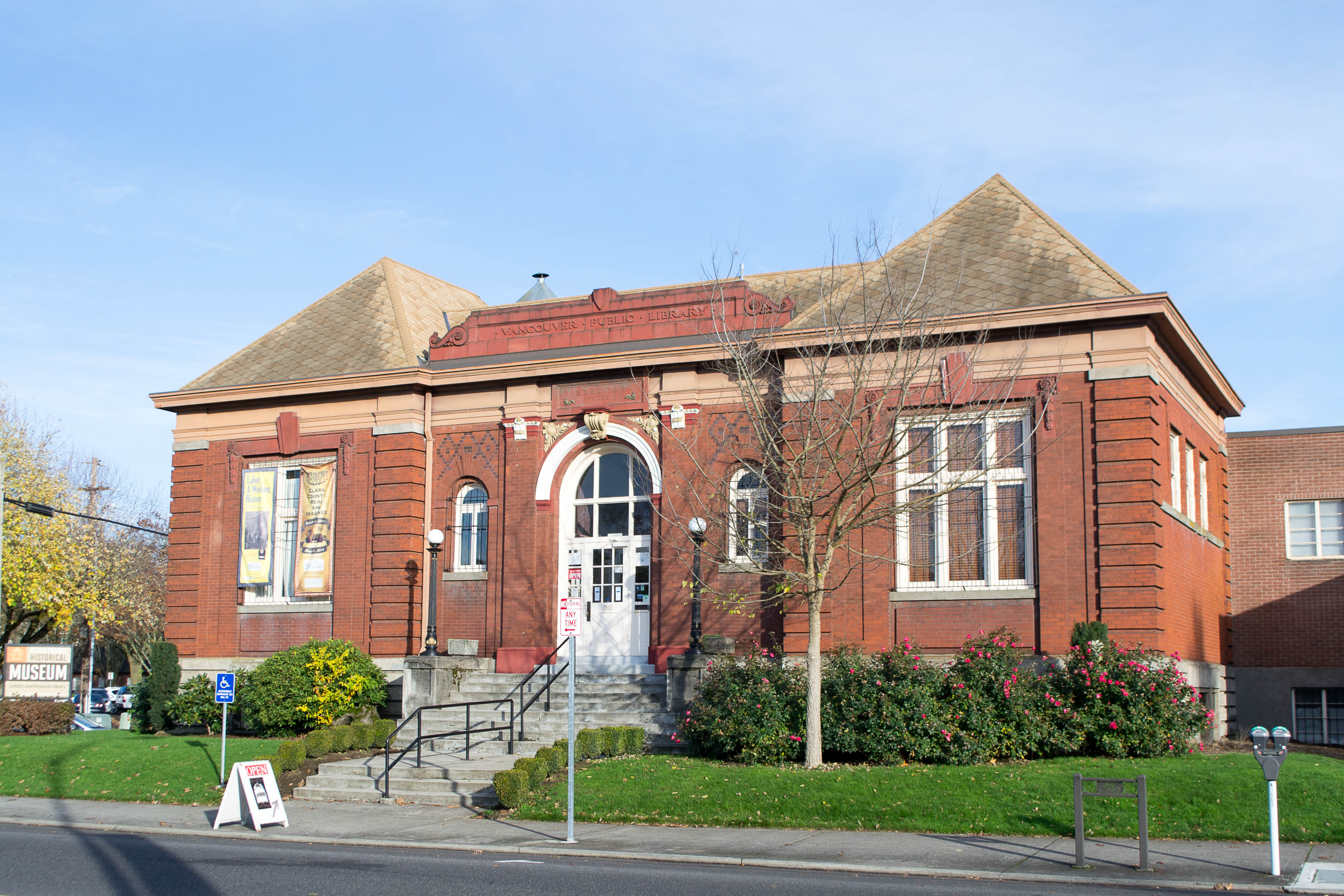
Vancouver Public Library Building

With Hoffar he worked on the design of new office blocks on Cordova Street and served as Clerk of Works on the construction of Vancouver's New Court House. In partnership with William Dalton, Eveleigh built up a thriving practice. The population of Vancouver grew from 25,000 to well over 100,000 in the first two decades of the twentieth century and Dalton and Eveleigh secured commissions for many of the new buildings in the city's commercial centre; in particular they enjoyed the patronage of Harvey Haddon, a wealthy English merchant and property developer in the city. Among their most prominent commissions were the Alcazar Hotel, the Wilson Office Block on Granville Street and the city's Masonic temple, as well as a number of offices and hotels in Downtown Vancouver on Granville Street, Hastings Street, Burrard Street and Seymour Street.

Eveleigh went into sole practice upon Dalton's retirement. In 1923 he was elected President of the Architectural Institute of British Columbia and continued to practice until illness forced his retirement in 1940.

== Civic work ==
Eveleigh took a keen interest in the artistic and literary life of the city, and was a member of the Art Workers' Guild (later the Arts and Crafts Association of Vancouver). He was a member of the Vancouver Library Board and in 1901 he contacted the philanthropist Andrew Carnegie for help in establishing a new library for the city. The five $10,000 cheques that Carnegie contributed to the project were all personally made out to Eveleigh. Eveleigh Street in Vancouver was named to commemorate his civic activities

== Personal life ==
Eveleigh was married to Mary Florence (née Southcott) with whom he had one son, Robert, and two daughters, Mrs R. E. Walker of Vancouver, and Mrs L. O. Tiffin of Montreal. At the time of her death in 1939 they had five grandchildren.

Eveleigh died in Vancouver on 29 November 1947.
