= Thompson Rivers University, Open Learning =

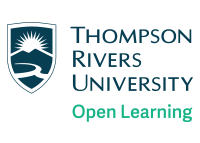
- TRU OL Logo
- Motto: Unlock the Possibilities
- Type: Public
- Location: Kamloops, British Columbia, Canada
- Campus: Thompson Rivers University
- Nickname: TRU-OL
- Website: www.tru.ca/distance/

Thompson Rivers University, Open Learning (TRU-OL) is a Canadian distance education provider, operating as the Open Learning Division of Thompson Rivers University (TRU) in Kamloops, British Columbia, Canada. The Open Learning Division offers courses and programs through online and distance learning. Currently over 590 courses and 55 programs are available for enrolment.

== About TRU-OL ==
The Open Learning division of Thompson Rivers University was created in 2005 when the university assumed ownership of all courses and programs of the former BC Open University. Today TRU-OL is based on the main Kamloops campus of TRU.

The Open Learning division offers courses and programs through online and distance learning. Currently over 550 courses and 55 programs are available for enrolment. Program credentials include adult secondary school completion; certificates and diplomas, including advanced and post-baccalaureate, associate degrees and bachelor's degrees.

Most of the Open Learning division's distance courses are offered continually throughout the year and are non-paced, which means students work through coursework on their own at their own rate of learning. Approximately 300 courses are designed and delivered by TRU-OL, while another 250 courses are available for registration through consortium institutions including Simon Fraser University and the University of Victoria.

== Learning Support Network ==
Program advisors help students develop educational plans and provide assistance determining prerequisites and entrance requirements for specific programs, transferring credit and assessing informal credit based on prior work experience. Once enrolled in a program, each student is assigned a personal program advisor who, through the entirety of their program, helps guide their education from program planning to course sequencing and selection. Students who complete a certificate, diploma or degree through TRU-OL receives a TRU credential and are invited to attend one of the two convocation ceremonies held at the TRU Kamloops campus.

== Distance and online programs and courses ==
Thompson Rivers University offers degrees and courses in Adult Basic Education, Arts, Business and Management Studies, Education, General Studies, Health and Human Services, Science, Technology and Tourism.

== See also ==
- Open Learning Agency
