= Canadian House of Commons Standing Committee on Public Safety and National Security =

Standing committee of the House of Commons of Canada

The House of Commons Standing Committee on Public Safety and National Security (SECU) is a standing committee of the House of Commons of Canada.

== Mandate ==
The SECU committee has a mandate to review and study the policies and programs of the Department of Public Safety and its agencies:

- The Canada Border Services Agency
- The Canadian Security Intelligence Service
- The Correctional Service of Canada
- The Parole Board of Canada
- The Royal Canadian Mounted Police
- The Security Intelligence Review Committee
- The Commission for Public Complaints Against the RCMP
- The RCMP External Review Committee
- The Office of the Correctional Investigator

In addition, it has duties with respect to:

- the investigation of the existence of drugs and alcohol in prisons
- the creation of criteria for the appointment of the Commissioner of the Royal Canadian Mounted Police

== Membership ==
=== 45th Canadian Parliament ===
Party	Member	District
Liberal	Jean-Yves Duclos, chair	Québec Centre, QC
Conservative	Frank Caputo, vice chair	Kamloops—Thompson—Nicola, BC
Bloc Québécois	Claude Debellefeuille, vice chair	Beauharnois—Salaberry—Soulanges—Huntingdon, QC
Liberal	Sima Acan	Oakville West, ON
Conservative	Chak Au	Richmond Centre—Marpole, BC
Liberal	Ali Ehsassi	Willowdale, ON
Conservative	Rhonda Kirkland	Oshawa, ON
Conservative	Dane Lloyd	Parkland, AB
Liberal	Marcus Powlowski	Thunder Bay—Rainy River, ON
Liberal	Jacques Ramsay	La Prairie—Atateken, QC

=== 44th Canadian Parliament ===
Role	Name	Party
Chair	Hon. Jim Carr (until December 12, 2022)	Liberal
Vice-Chair	Raquel Dancho	Conservative
Vice-Chair	Kristina Michaud	Bloc Québécois
Member	Paul Chiang	Liberal
Member	Pam Damoff	Liberal
Member	Dane Lloyd	Conservative
Member	Alistair MacGregor	NDP
Member	Ron McKinnon	Liberal
Member	Taleeb Noormohamed	Liberal
Member	Doug Shipley	Conservative
Member	Tako Van Popta	Conservative
Member	Sameer Zuberi	Liberal

=== 42nd Canadian Parliament ===
Party	Member	Riding
Liberal	Rob Oliphant, Chair	Don Valley West, ON
Liberal	René Arseneault	Madawaska—Restigouche, NB
Liberal	Pam Damoff	Oakville North—Burlington, ON
Liberal	Nicola Di Iorio	Saint-Léonard—Saint-Michel, QC
Liberal	Michel Picard	Montarville, QC
Liberal	Sven Spengemann	Mississauga—Lakeshore, ON
Conservative	Larry Miller, Vice-Chair	Bruce—Grey—Owen Sound, ON
Conservative	Tony Clement	Parry Sound-Muskoka, ON
Conservative	Dianne Watts	South Surrey—White Rock, BC
New Democratic	Matthew Dubé, Vice-Chair	Beloeil—Chambly, QC

== Subcommittees ==
- Subcommittee on Agenda and Procedure (SSEC)
