= Terry Lake =

Canadian politician

Terry Lake DVM
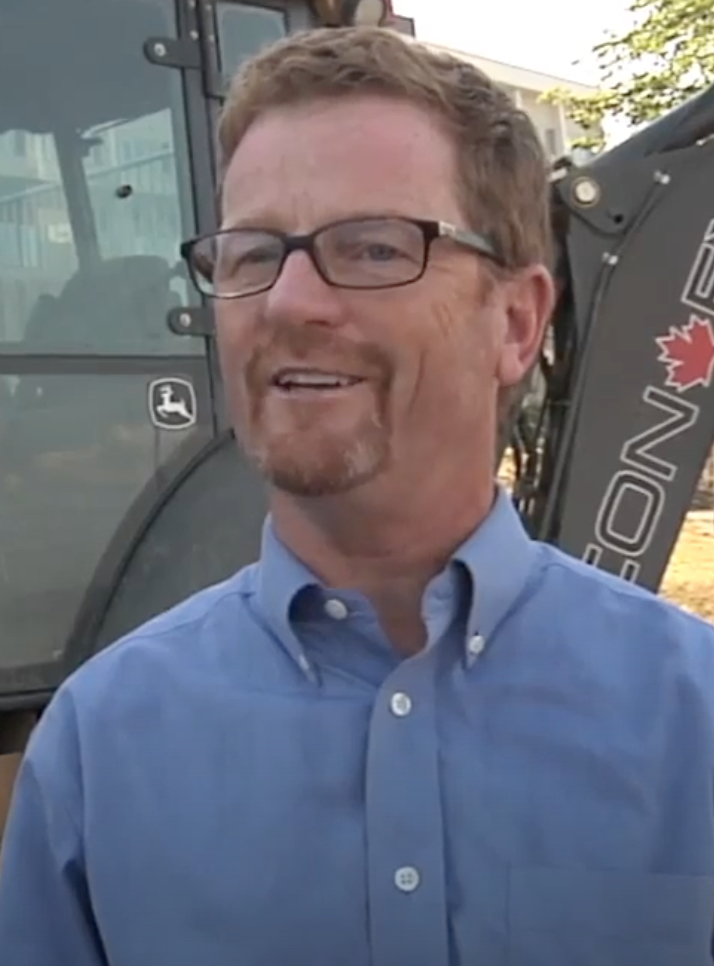

Minister of Health of British Columbia
- In office June 10, 2013 – June 12, 2017
- Premier: Christy Clark
- Preceded by: Margaret MacDiarmid
- Succeeded by: Mary Polak

Minister of Environment of British Columbia
- In office March 14, 2011 – April 16, 2013
- Premier: Christy Clark
- Preceded by: Murray Coell
- Succeeded by: Mary Polak

Member of the Legislative Assembly for Kamloops-North Thompson
- In office May 12, 2009 – April 11, 2017
- Preceded by: Kevin Krueger
- Succeeded by: Peter Milobar

Mayor of Kamloops
- In office December 5, 2005 – December 1, 2008
- Preceded by: Mel Rothenburger
- Succeeded by: Peter Milobar

Kamloops City Councillor
- In office December 3, 2002 – December 5, 2005

Personal details
- Born: 1957 (age 68–69) Odiham, England
- Party: BC Liberal
- Other political affiliations: Liberal (federal)
- Spouse: Lisa Lake
- Children: 3
- Occupation: Veterinarian

Terry Lake is a former Canadian politician, at the municipal and provincial levels, and veterinarian.

Lake was a Member of the Legislative Assembly of British Columbia and a member of the BC Liberal Party. Lake announced September 1, 2016 that he would not seek re-election in 2017.

He was elected to the Legislative Assembly from the riding of Kamloops-North Thompson in the 2009 provincial election. In the 39th Parliament of British Columbia, Lake was not named to Premier Gordon Campbell's cabinet, but he was appointed Parliamentary Secretary for the Ranching Task Force and, following that task force's work, Lake was appointed Parliamentary Secretary for Health Promotion. Lake also chaired the Sled Dog Task Force. Once Christy Clark became premier she appointed Lake, on March 14, 2011, the Minister of Environment.

Lake gained media attention when he chaired the Select Standing Committee on Legislative Initiatives. When the provincial government announced the intention to introduce the Harmonized Sales Tax, a petition against the tax was circulated across the province, gaining the required number of signatures to force the Select Standing Committee on Legislative Initiatives to either order a referendum on the tax legislation or forward the issue to the Legislative Assembly. Lake's involvement with the HST led to a recall campaign against him in early 2011, but which failed.

Prior to being elected as a MLA, Lake was elected to one term (2005–2008) as mayor of the City of Kamloops and one term (2002–2005) as a councillor of the city. In Kamloops, Lake made priorities of developing a convention centre and expanding the airport. He was also involved is passing citywide vicious dog bylaw and regulations on performances by exotic animals. He served on the executive of the Union of British Columbia Municipalities in 2005 and on the board of BC Transit from 2006 to 2008.

A veterinarian by training, he was an animal health technology instructor at Thompson Rivers University in Kamloops from 1997 to 2005. He had an early career in broadcasting, but eventually became a veterinarian. He owned Coquitlam Animal Hospital from 1989 to 1996, before moving to Kamloops with his family. He is a past vice-president and treasurer for the World Small Animal Veterinary Association.

On 21 May 2019, Lake was acclaimed as the Liberal Party of Canada's candidate in the riding of Kamloops—Thompson—Cariboo for the 2019 Canadian federal election. He was not successful in the election.

== Background ==
Lake was born in Odiham, Hampshire, England, to a father, Morris, who worked as an electrician in the Royal Air Force. Morris moved his family, which included two daughters and two sons, to numerous air force bases around the world, including Calgary, Germany and Saudi Arabia. They moved, in 1972, to the Okanagan area of British Columbia where Terry graduated from high school. He attended Mount Royal University in Calgary, Alberta, where he studied journalism and worked for Broadcast News. He went on to the University of Saskatchewan in Saskatoon where he graduated with a doctorate degree in veterinary medicine. He then moved to Coquitlam, British Columbia, where he opened his own veterinary practice, in 1989, called the Coquitlam Animal Hospital. He became active in the B.C. Veterinary Medical Association serving as a councilor and secretary-treasurer. He was recognized by Tourism Vancouver with a "Be a Host Legacy Award" in 1997 for his efforts in attracting the World Small Animal Veterinary Association to hold their annual world congress in Vancouver. Lake went on to serve as a board officer, vice-president and treasurer for that Association.

After several visits to friends who lived Kamloops, Lake and his wife, along with their three daughters, decided to move there. He got a teaching position at Thompson Rivers University's animal-health technology program beginning in 1997. He became active in the community, playing in the soccer league, coaching youth soccer and lobbying to ban performances by exotic animals within the city, like during a circus or rodeo. In 1999, he sought to be elected to the city council. During the campaign, he noted that he was in favour of installing residential water meters, a moratorium on new big-box stores until an impact assessment was completed, and he was opposed to using referendums to make tough decisions. With eight council seats in contention, Lake finished in ninth place with 5,400 votes and claimed $4,562 in election expenses. Lake complained afterwards, and sought legal advice, regarding illegal advertising by the third-place finisher, Brian Husband, who ran radio ads on election day. Lake continued to help organize the World Small Animal Veterinary Association's annual (2001) conference which he helped attract to Vancouver. He returned to Kamloops advocating that the city develop a modern conference centre.

== Municipal politics ==
=== Councillor ===
He sought election to the same city council in 2002, advocating for a new conference centre. He finished third with 9,477 votes and claimed $2,609 in election expenses. As a councillor he led the development and implementation of a vicious dog bylaw which allows the city to designate dogs which bite or threaten people without provocation as 'dangerous' and place restriction on their containment and public handling. He differed from the rest of council by resisting the $3-million commitment to build the Kamloops Wildlife Park, opposing the renaming of Overlanders Bridge to the Phil Gaglardi Bridge (which approved by the rest of council but later rescinded), and favouring higher parking fees in the downtown area. He took time in 2004 to work as Liberal John O'Fee's campaign manager in the federal election which they lost to Conservative Betty Hinton. In 2005 he was elected to the board of the Union of B.C. Municipalities, attended the Federation of Canadian Municipalities convention in St. John's, Newfoundland, and visited Aichi, Japan as part of a cultural exchange with Kamloops's sister city.

Mayor of Kamloops

With the incumbent mayor retiring, Lake sought to be elected as mayor in the November 2005 election. He faced two others: public relations worker Al McNair and crime-prevention officer Pete Backus. City debt emerged as a primary point of contention during the campaign, with Lake arguing that the debt is an investment in the community and was at a manageable level, and McNair arguing it was too high and uncontrollable. Lake won the election with an unexpectedly high number of votes (11,727) while spending $38,564. He identified airport expansion as his top priority. However, WestJet resisted flying to Kamloops by demanding guaranteed revenue and federal MP Betty Hinton and provincial MLA Kevin Krueger both saw highway upgrades as higher priorities. In 2006, Lake was appointed to the board of governors for B.C. Transit. Also in 2006, Lake opposed his council who voted in favour of sending a letter to the province requesting a ban on uranium exploration and mining and Lake sought reforms to the Agricultural Land Commission (via a motion to the Union of B.C. Municipalities) after they refused two Kamloops development applications. As a board member of the Thompson-Nicola Regional District, Lake suggested the province should enable local governments (outside of Metro Vancouver) to levy a gasoline tax so that local public transit could be removed from property taxes. While Kamloops was struggling with a bylaw to ban cosmetic pesticides, Lake advocated for a province wide ban. Lake traveled to Japan and China in October 2007 promoting Kamloops (and resulted in Chinese speed skaters using facilities in Kamloops to train for the 2010 Winter Olympics), and to Sri Lanka in January 2008 as part of a volunteer organization re-building homes lost in the 2004 tsunami. Lake would return to Sri Lanka in January 2011 to continue his volunteer work.

== Provincial politics ==
=== Ranching Task Force ===
In July 2008, Kamloops MLA Claude Richmond announced he would not seek re-election in the May 2009 provincial election. Consequently, Lake announced that he would not stand for re-election as mayor but would instead seek to replace Richmond. With MLA Kevin Krueger moving to the new Kamloops-South Thompson riding, Lake was unopposed for BC Liberal nomination in the Kamloops-North Thompson. The election was expected to be close but Lake ultimately defeated the NDP candidate Doug Brown, student April Snowe for the Green Party, Clearwater resident Wayne Russell of the Refederation Party, and the Work Less Party's Keston Broughton. Lake's BC Liberals won the election and formed a majority government under Premier Gordon Campbell. In the first two sessions of the 39th Parliament Lake was appointed to the Select Standing Committee on Aboriginal Affairs and the Select Standing Committee on Health, however neither of those committees held any meetings. Premier Campbell did not include Lake in the cabinet but he was appointed as the Parliamentary Secretary for the Ranching Task Force under the Ministry of Agriculture and Lands. The Ranching Task Force began its work in July to review the province's role in the ranching industry, an industry which had been facing setbacks such as declining cattle prices and fewer exports following a Bovine spongiform encephalopathy outbreak and a strengthen currency value (relative to the US dollar). The task force's final report and recommendations were sent to the Minister of Agriculture and Lands in November 2009.

=== Harmonized Sales Tax ===
Lake was also appointed as the convener the Select Standing Committee on Legislative Initiatives, which had not met in over a decade and was not expected to meet any time soon. However, Lake was forced to convene the committee after a petition against the provincial government's intentions to switch the sales tax system to the Harmonized Sales Tax system successfully collected the required 10% of voters in every riding. Lake was supportive of the new Harmonized Sales Tax, even though more people in the Kamloops-North Thompson riding signed the anti-HST petition than voted for Lake. Lake caused controversy in May 2010 when he misspoke saying that the Committee on Legislative Initiatives had the power to refuse the petition based on unclear wording and in August when he refused to accept the petition as delivered by the proponents (Lake would only accept it from the Chief Electoral Officer who was holding it pending the resolution of a court challenge by pro-HST consortium). The petition was forwarded to the committee in September and the committee met twice to decide whether to forward the petition to the legislative assembly or call a provincial referendum on the question. At the same time as the HST petition was circulating, the Fight HST group was soliciting input on whether to launch a recall campaign against Lake. In June 2010, Lake was included on their list of potential recall candidates which also included 23 other BC Liberal MLAs. Lake aggressively responded to the recall challenge by calling its organizer a "bully" and "petulant child" and issuing news releases quoting derogatory comments made by others involved in the Fight HST group. The recall campaign occurred in February–March 2011; the group had 60 days to collect signatures of 40% of the 38,246 voters but were only able to collect 26% (10,087 signatures). Afterwards, the Chief Electoral Officer offered his suggestions for reform of the recall legislation, to which Lake emphasized the ability of organizers to destroy petitions should be amended as he was unable to verify the number of signatures claimed by the organizers. Even though Elections BC does not verify failed Recall Petitions. Lake was a member of the Special Committee to Appoint a Chief Electoral Officer, which met in May 2011, but upon advice from the Conflict of Interest Commissioner, Lake withdrew due to his involvement with the Select Standing Committee on Legislative Initiatives, the referendum, and the recall campaign.

=== Sled Dog Task Force ===
Premier Campbell's October 2010 cabinet shuffle created for Lake the role of Parliamentary Secretary for Health Promotion as his old position as Parliamentary Secretary for the Ranching Task Force was eliminated. Following the revelation of the Whistler sled dog cull, Campbell appointed Lake to head the Sled Dog Task Force, consisting of two other people (representative from the Union of BC Municipalities and the BC SPCA) to review the provincial government's role in the dog sledding industry and the responses made by agencies to the cull. The task force was given until March 25 to provide a report and recommendations to the Ministry of Agriculture, however there were complications as the delays occurred as an unexpected volume of public input from around the world had to be considered and the criminal RCMP investigation made key evidence and witnesses unavailable. All the recommendations from the task force were eventually enacted in the Prevention of Cruelty to Animals Amendment Act, 2011.

=== Minister of Environment ===
After Campbell announced his resignation the BC Liberal Party leadership election began, the winner of which would become premier. In mid-December 2010 Lake endorsed George Abbott, citing Abbott's "collaborative and engaging style to governing" and his profile as a fellow Interior and rural MLA. Christy Clark would eventually win the leadership race. When the 39th Parliament resumed with a third session and Clark as premier, she promoted Lake to Minister of Environment and made him the deputy government house leader. Clark and Lake committed to continue with the carbon tax and a carbon neutral public service, but backed away from the province's legislated greenhouse gas reduction targets. The issue about BC's participation in the Western Climate Initiative was reviewed by the entire cabinet, who decided to continue with WCI's planned cap-and-trade system. An emphasis in the Ministry of Environment was placed on BC Parks with announcements by Clark and Lake on the elimination of parking fees at parks, a one-year youth passport program, new online tools to facilitate park usage, a park bench sponsorship program, and a $500,000 program to celebrate B.C. Parks' 100th-anniversary. Lake came under criticism for not publicly releasing the report and recommendations of the Species at Risk Task Force. To compensate for the slow action on the task force, the opposition environment critic Rob Fleming re-introduced his own Species at Risk Protection Act in June 2011. Lake released the task force report in July for a public comment period. As the Minister of Environment, Lake had to defend the Environmental Assessment Office following a review by the Auditor General who identified short-comings and continued criticism regarding the rigorousness of the environmental review process as a proposed copper-gold mine, which was approved by Lake's predecessor, was refused by the federal government. Lake came under criticism from fellow BC Liberal MLAs John Les, John van Dongen, and Donna Barnett after Lake approved Metro Vancouver's waste-management plan which included proposals to incinerate garbage; Les and van Dongen felt the plan would significantly lower air quality in their Fraser Valley ridings and Barnett advocated for continuing the hauling of garbage to the Cache Creek landfill in her riding.

== Federal politics ==
Lake did not seek re-election in 2017 following the 40th Parliament of British Columbia and instead accepted a position with the medical cannabis company The Hydropothecary Corporation. In April 2019 he announced his intention to seek the Liberal Party nomination in the Kamloops—Thompson—Cariboo riding for the 2019 Canadian federal election. In the May nomination meeting, the 62 year old was acclaimed to be the nominee. In the October general election, Lake lost to Conservative Party incumbent Cathy McLeod.

== Electoral record ==
=== Federal ===
2019 Canadian federal election: Kamloops—Thompson—Cariboo
Party	Candidate	Votes	%	±%	Expenditures
Conservative	Cathy McLeod	32,415	44.74	+9.49	$108,473.22
Liberal	Terry Lake	19,716	27.21	–3.20	$79,264.65
New Democratic	Cynthia Egli	9,936	13.71	–17.06	$31,291.00
Green	Iain Currie	8,789	12.13	+8.56	$66,820.29
People's	Ken Finlayson	1,132	1.56	–	$7,402.62
Animal Protection	Kira Cheeseborough	321	0.44	–	$1,599.00
Communist	Peter Kerek	144	0.20	–	$1,257.59
Total valid votes/expense limit		72,453	99.57	–	$142,800.35
Total rejected ballots		311	0.43	+0.18	
Turnout		72,764	69.93	–3.42	
Eligible voters		104,054			
Conservative hold		Swing		+6.34	
Source: Elections Canada

=== Provincial ===
2013 British Columbia general election: Kamloops-North Thompson
Party	Candidate	Votes	%	±%	Expenditures
Liberal	Terry Lake	12,183	52.06	+5.1	$124,595
New Democratic	Kathy Kendall	9,139	39.05	–5.9	$84,911
Conservative	Ed Klop	1,644	7.03	–	$9,211
No affiliation	John Ford	436	1.86	–	$250
Total valid votes		23,402	100.00		
Total rejected ballots		141	0.60		
Turnout		23,543	57.97		
Source: Elections BC

B.C. General Election 2009: Kamloops-North Thompson
Party	Candidate	Votes	%	±	Expenditures
Liberal	Terry Lake	9,830	47%	n/a	$108,572
New Democratic	Doug Brown	9,320	45%	n/a	$84,848
Green	April Snowe	1,418	7%	n/a	$1,010
Refederation	Wayne Russell	251	1%	n/a	$260
Work Less	Keston Broughton	124	0.6%	n/a	$550
Total Valid Votes		20,943	100%		
Total Rejected Ballots		112	0.5%		
Turnout		21,055	55%		
