= 2017 Sturgeon River—Parkland federal by-election =

- October 23, 2017

Riding of Sturgeon River—Parkland
	First party	Second party	Third party
		LPC	NDP
Candidate	Dane Lloyd	Brian Gold	Shawna Gawreluck
Party	Conservative	Liberal	New Democratic
Popular vote	16,125	2,508	1,606
Percentage	77.36%	12.03%	7.70%
Swing	▲7.13%	▼3.55%	▼2.32%
MP before election
Rona Ambrose
Conservative
Elected MP
Dane Lloyd
Conservative

A by-election was held in the federal riding of Sturgeon River—Parkland in Alberta on 23 October 2017 following the resignation of Conservative MP Rona Ambrose. The seat was held for the Conservatives by Dane Lloyd.

The by-election was held on the same day as another Tory held seat in Lac-Saint-Jean in Quebec. This seat however was lost to the Liberals.

== Background ==
=== Constituency ===
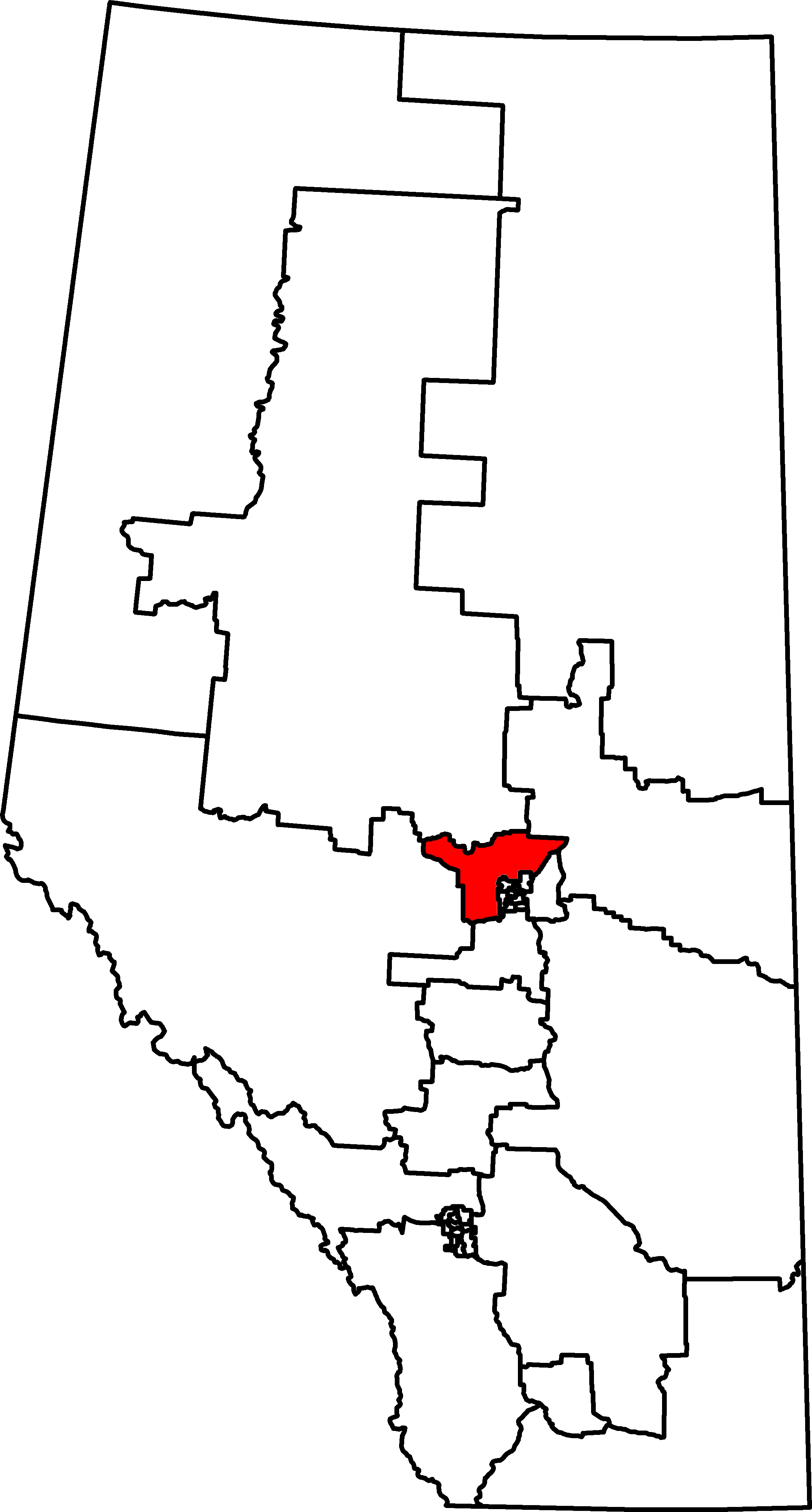
The constituency in Alberta.

Sturgeon River—Parkland is a rural riding in Central Alberta; to the north and west of the city of Edmonton. The constituency covers a number of prairie towns and Indian reserves.

=== Representation ===
Sturgeon River—Parkland is considered a safe seat for the Tories. It was newly created for the 2015 general election, and was the seat of Rona Ambrose when she was Leader of the Opposition as Leader of the Conservative Party of Canada.

== Campaign ==
The riding of was vacated on July 4, 2017, due to the resignation of Rona Ambrose whose term as interim Conservative Party of Canada leader ended with the election of her successor on May 27, 2017. Ambrose announced her decision to resign to the Conservative Party caucus on May 12, 2017, and her decision was made public on May 15. The suburban Edmonton riding was created for the 2015 federal election and has had Ambrose as its sole MP. It was created predominantly out of the former electoral district of Edmonton—Spruce Grove – for which Ambrose was the MP since its inception at the 2004 federal election – as well as Westlock—St. Paul which was held only by Conservatives from its creation in 2004 until it was abolished in 2015, as well as a small portion from the Yellowhead constituency which has been Conservative since 2003, and was previously held successively by the Progressive Conservatives, Reform Party and Canadian Alliance.

Former parliamentary staffer Dane Lloyd defeated businessman and former 2017 Conservative leadership contestant Rick Peterson, Ambrose constituency staffer Luke Inberg and former Prime Minister's Office staffer Jamie Mozeson for the Conservative nomination. A rumoured candidate for the Conservative nomination was Garry Keller, who served as Ambrose's chief of staff. On August 25, Keller declared he would not run for the nomination. The nomination to choose a Conservative candidate was held over two days, September 23 and 24.

University of Alberta professor Brian Gold was acclaimed the Liberal Party candidate. Gold previously ran for the party in 2015 in Edmonton Griesbach.

Medical laboratory technologist Shawna Gawreluck was selected as the NDP candidate.

Educator Ernest Chauvet defeated businessman Kevin Schulthies for the Christian Heritage Party nomination on September 14.

The warrant issued by the Speaker regarding the vacancy was received by the Chief Electoral Officer on July 4, 2017; under the Parliament of Canada Act the writ for a by-election had to be dropped no sooner than August 21, 2017, and no later than December 31, 2017 (11 and 180 days, respectively, from the warrant receipt date). On September 17, 2017, the writ was dropped for a by-election held on October 23, 2017.

== Results ==
Canadian federal by-election, 2017: Sturgeon River—Parkland Resignation of Rona Ambrose
Party	Candidate	Votes	%	±%	Expenditures
Conservative	Dane Lloyd	16,125	77.37	+7.13	$52,032.98
Liberal	Brian Gold	2,508	12.03	–3.55	$30,577.31
New Democratic	Shawna Gawreluck	1,606	7.71	–2.31	$4,065.06
Christian Heritage	Ernest Chauvet	603	2.89	+1.77	$11,920.86
Total valid votes/expense limit		20,842	99.78	–	$109,599.82
Total rejected ballots		45	0.22	–0.03	
Turnout		20,887	23.68	–47.24	
Eligible voters		88,218			
Conservative hold		Swing		+5.34	
Source: Elections Canada

== 2015 results ==
2015 Canadian federal election: Sturgeon River—Parkland
Party	Candidate	Votes	%	±%	Expenditures
Conservative	Rona Ambrose	43,220	70.23	–7.26	$98,166.59
Liberal	Travis Dueck	9,586	15.58	+10.11	$258.78
New Democratic	Guy Desforges	6,166	10.02	–2.95	$7,730.56
Green	Brendon Greene	1,875	3.05	–0.95	$3,593.60
Christian Heritage	Ernest Chauvet	690	1.12	–	$10,477.93
Total valid votes/expense limit		61,537	99.75	–	$222,470.71
Total rejected ballots		157	0.25	–	
Turnout		61,694	70.92	–	
Eligible voters		86,994			
Conservative hold		Swing		–8.68	
Source: Elections Canada

== See also ==
- By-elections to the 42nd Canadian Parliament
