= Cathy McLeod =

Canadian politician (born 1957)

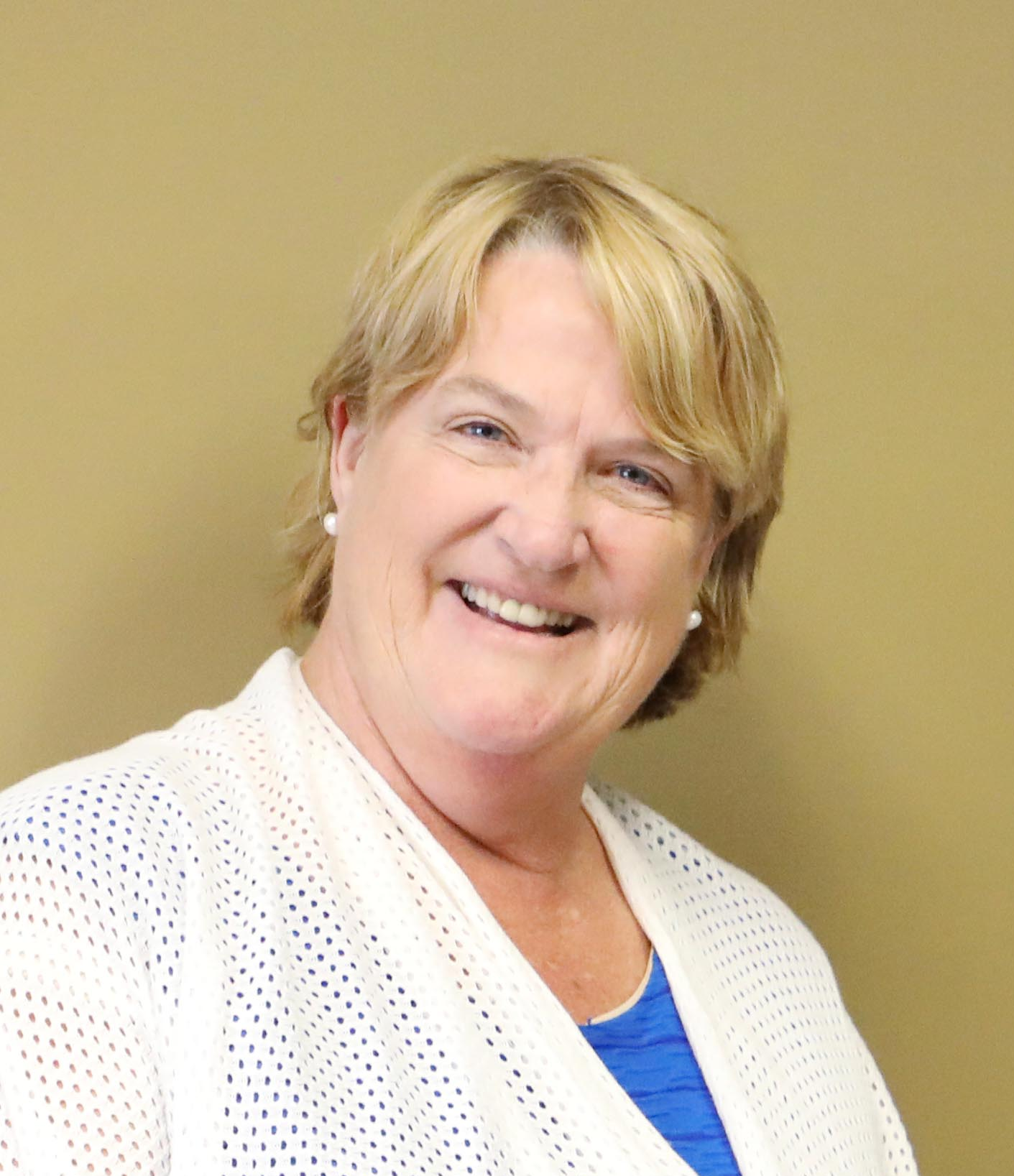
- McLeod in 2017

Official Opposition Critic for Crown-Indigenous Relations
- In office 20 November 2015 – 15 August 2021
- Leader: Rona Ambrose; Andrew Scheer; Erin O'Toole
- Preceded by: Niki Ashton

Member of Parliament for Kamloops—Thompson—Cariboo
- In office 14 October 2008 – 20 September 2021
- Preceded by: Betty Hinton
- Succeeded by: Frank Caputo

Personal details
- Born: 12 June 1957 (age 68) Kingston, Ontario, Canada
- Party: Conservative
- Profession: nurse, administrator

Cathy McLeod (born 12 June 1957) is a former Canadian politician who served as the Member of Parliament (MP) for the riding of Kamloops—Thompson—Cariboo from 2008 to 2021. She served as a member of the Conservative Party.

== Biography ==
McLeod was born in Kingston, Ontario, Canada.

In 1981, McLeod completed training from the University of Western Ontario as a registered nurse, practicing for some years thereafter.

McLeod was a municipal politician in Pemberton, British Columbia, serving as a town councillor from 1993 to 1996 and then as mayor from 1996 to 1999, before moving to Kamloops, where she worked as a nurse and a health care administrator.

In the 2008 federal election, McLeod was elected Member of Parliament for the riding of Kamloops—Thompson—Cariboo. She was re-elected in the 2011 federal election with 52% of the riding's vote. On 30 January 2011, she became Parliamentary Secretary to the Minister of National Revenue. On 19 September 2013, she became Parliamentary Secretary to the Minister of Labour and for Western Economic Diversification.

McLeod was re-elected in the 2015 and 2019 federal elections. On 4 February 2021, McLeod announced she would not seek re-election. In the 2021 Canadian federal election, Frank Caputo held the riding for the Conservatives.

== Electoral record ==
2019 Canadian federal election: Kamloops—Thompson—Cariboo
Party	Candidate	Votes	%	±%	Expenditures
Conservative	Cathy McLeod	32,415	44.74	+9.49	$108,203.10
Liberal	Terry Lake	19,716	27.21	-3.20	$75,414.37
New Democratic	Cynthia Egli	9,936	13.71	-17.06	$31,291.00
Green	Iain Currie	8,789	12.13	+8.56	$66,820.29
People's	Ken Finlayson	1,132	1.56		none listed
Animal Protection	Kira Cheeseborough	321	0.44	-	$1,599.00
Communist	Peter Kerek	144	0.20	-	none listed
Total valid votes/expense limit		72,453	99.57		
Total rejected ballots		311	0.43	+0.18	
Turnout		72,764	69.93	-3.42	
Eligible voters		104,054			
Conservative hold		Swing		+6.34	
Source: Elections Canada

2015 Canadian federal election: Kamloops—Thompson—Cariboo
Party	Candidate	Votes	%	±%	Expenditures
Conservative	Cathy McLeod	24,595	35.25	-17.04	$151,162.59
New Democratic	Bill Sundhu	21,466	30.77	-6.17	$153,060.21
Liberal	Steve Powrie	21,215	30.41	+25.05	$38,402.70
Green	Matt Greenwood	2,489	3.57	-1.52	$1,761.67
Total valid votes/expense limit		69,765	99.75		$271,469.66
Total rejected ballots		174	0.25	–	
Turnout		69,939	73.35		
Eligible voters		95,347			
Conservative hold		Swing		-5.43	
Source: Elections Canada

2011 Canadian federal election: Kamloops—Thompson—Cariboo
Party	Candidate	Votes	%	±%
Conservative	Cathy McLeod	29,682	52.24	+6.08
New Democratic	Michael Crawford	20,983	36.93	+1.04
Liberal	Murray Todd	3,026	5.33	-4.51
Green	Donovan Grube Cavers	2,932	5.16	-2.95
Christian Heritage	Christopher Kempling	191	0.34	–
Total valid votes		56,814	100.0	
Total rejected ballots		164	0.3	±0
Turnout		56,978	63.3	+1.2
Eligible voters		89,964		
Conservative hold		Swing		+2.52

2008 Canadian federal election: Kamloops—Thompson—Cariboo
Party	Candidate	Votes	%	±%	Expenditures
Conservative	Cathy McLeod	25,209	46.16	+6.89	$82,161
New Democratic	Michael Crawford	19,601	35.89	+5.11	$74,451
Liberal	Ken Sommerfeld	5,375	9.84	-15.38	$61,963
Green	Donovan Grube Cavers	4,430	8.11	+3.39	$1,996
Total valid votes/expense limit		54,615	100.0		$107,718
Total rejected ballots		137	0.3	+0.1	
Total votes		54,752	62.0	+1	
Conservative hold		Swing		+0.89	
