= Frank Caputo =

Canadian politician

Frank Caputo MP

Member of Parliament for Kamloops—Thompson—Nicola Kamloops—Thompson—Cariboo (2021–2025)
- Incumbent
- Assumed office September 20, 2021
- Preceded by: Cathy McLeod

Personal details
- Party: Conservative
- Occupation: Politician

Frank Caputo is a Canadian politician from British Columbia. He was elected to represent the riding of Kamloops—Thompson—Cariboo in the House of Commons of Canada in the 2021 Canadian federal election. The name of the riding was changed to Kamloops—Thompson—Nicola in the 2025 federal election. He is a member of the Conservative Party of Canada and succeeded a retiring MP from the same party, Cathy McLeod.

He was elected vice chair of the Canadian House of Commons Standing Committee on Public Safety and National Security in the 45th Canadian Parliament in 2025. He currently serves in Shadow Cabinet as the Shadow Minister for Public Safety.

Prior to being elected, Caputo was a Crown prosecutor and instructor at Thompson Rivers University.

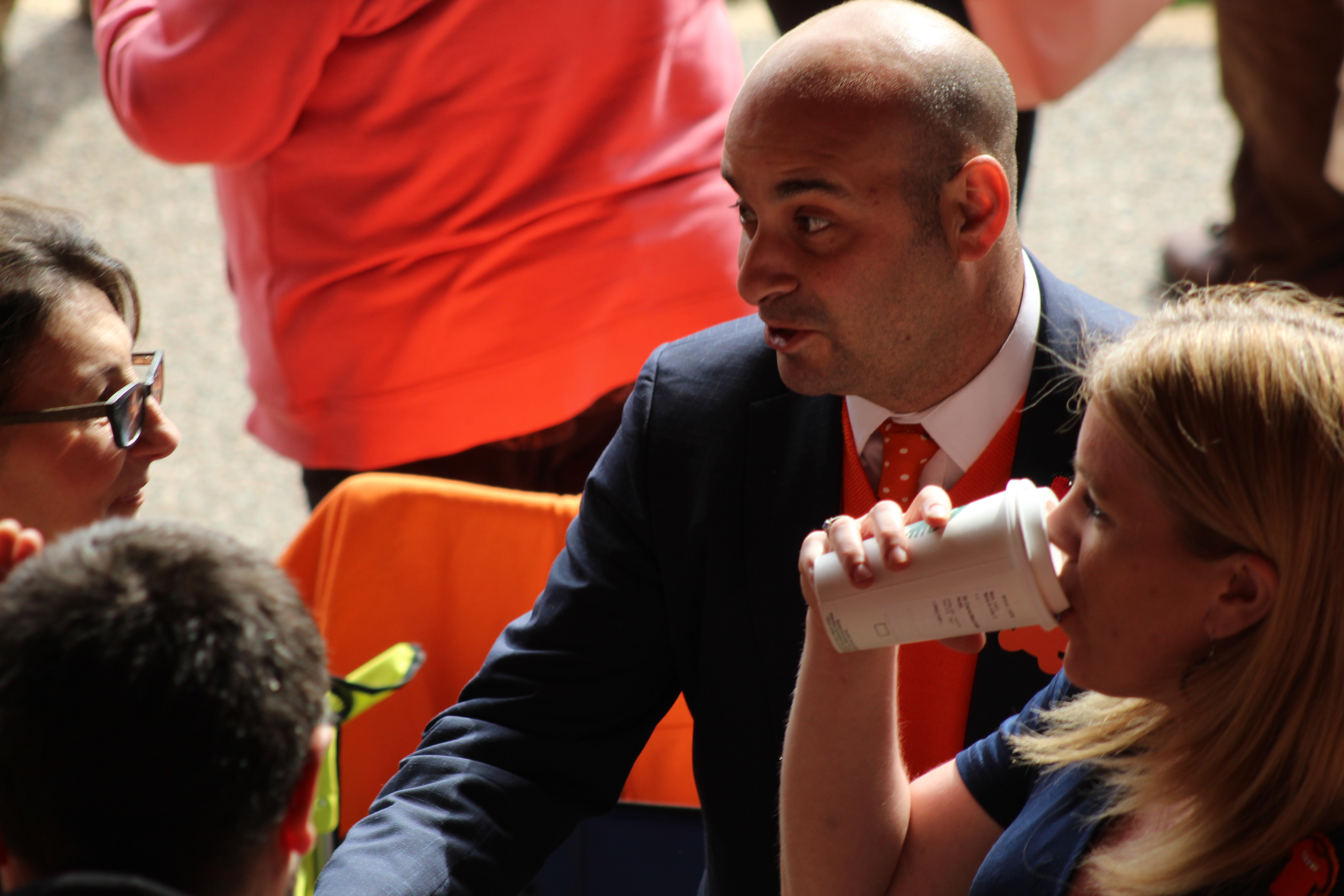
Frank Caputo at the Tk̓emlúps Pow Wow Arbour on May 23, 2022, attending the Le Estcwicwéy̓ Memorial, which honoured the missing 215+ buried at the site of the former Kamloops Indian Residential School.

== Successful Private Members’ Bills ==
Caputo has sponsored and played a central role in the development of several Private Members' Bills. His legislative work has focused particularly on criminal law, the protection of children, and intimate partner violence.

- C-291, introduced in 2022 and enacted in 2024, amended the Criminal Code and related legislation to replace the term "child pornography" with "child sexual abuse and exploitation material".
- C-225, introduced in 2025 and commonly referred to as "Bailey's Law", proposes significant amendments to the Criminal Code concerning intimate partner violence, including a new first-degree murder provision where an intimate partner is killed in the context of coercive or controlling conduct.

Private Members' Bills rarely receive Royal Assent, as most government legislation originates with the Cabinet of the governing party. C-291 and C-225 therefore represents a significant legislative achievement in Caputo's parliamentary career.

C-291 — An Act to amend the Criminal Code and to make consequential amendments to other Acts

In 2022, Caputo drafted Bill C-291, a Private Member's Bill introduced in the House of Commons in Conservative MP Mel Arnold, then representing North Okanagan—Shuswap, name. The bill sought to replace the term "child pornography" in Canadian federal legislation with "child sexual abuse and exploitation material". Parliament's records identify Caputo as central to the bill's conception and drafting, drawing on his previous experience as a Crown prosecutor.

The bill did not change the underlying criminal-law definition or penalties associated with the offences. Rather, it changed the terminology used in the Criminal Code and related legislation to more accurately describe the nature of the material and the abuse involved. During committee consideration, Caputo stated that the definition itself was not being changed, but that Parliament was calling the material by a more accurate name.

Caputo argued that the expression "child pornography" was inappropriate because the material depicts the sexual abuse and exploitation of children and is not consensually produced. During debate, he emphasized that the continued circulation and viewing of such material represents the repeated victimization of children.

Bill C-291 received full parliamentary support. It passed second reading in the House of Commons by a vote of 318–0 on November 23, 2022, and passed third reading by a vote of 323–0 on February 1, 2023.

The bill subsequently passed the Senate and received Royal Assent on October 10, 2024, becoming An Act to amend the Criminal Code and to make consequential amendments to other Acts (child sexual abuse and exploitation material), chapter 23 of the Statutes of Canada, 2024.

C-225 — Bailey's Law

In 2025, Caputo introduced Bill C-225, An Act to amend the Criminal Code, a Private Member's Bill addressing intimate partner violence. The legislation has become commonly known as "Bailey's Law", following the request of the family of Bailey McCourt, a woman who was killed by a former intimate partner after he had been convicted of abusing her.

Caputo introduced the bill as a response to what he described as an epidemic of intimate partner violence in Canada. In his speech introducing the legislation, he emphasized that intimate partner violence differs from other forms of violence because it can occur within relationships characterized by trust, intimacy, financial dependence and other forms of vulnerability.

Bill C-225 proposes several amendments to the Criminal Code. Among its principal provisions are the creation of a specific first-degree murder offence where an intimate partner is killed in the context of a pattern of coercive or controlling conduct; provisions concerning manslaughter committed in the context of such conduct; new offences involving violence against intimate partners; and amendments concerning the detention of seized evidence.

Bill C-225 was introduced in the House of Commons on September 18, 2025. It passed second reading on December 3, 2025, and subsequently passed third reading on April 27, 2026. It was then transmitted to the Senate, where it received first reading on April 28, 2026 and royal assent on June 17, 2026.

== Electoral record ==
2025 Canadian federal election: Kamloops—Thompson—Nicola
Party	Candidate	Votes	%	±%	Expenditures
Conservative	Frank Caputo	32,008	51.54	+8.04	$98,593.33
Liberal	Iain Currie	24,961	40.19	+22.49	$48,683.25
New Democratic	Miguel Godau	3,681	5.93	–22.63	$17,377.27
Green	Jenna Lindley	936	1.51	–2.25	none listed
People's	Chris Enns	516	0.83	–5.14	$5,524.43
Total valid votes/expense limit		62,102	99.49	–	$161,416.54
Total rejected ballots		320	0.51	–	
Turnout		62,422	69.35	–	
Eligible voters		90,012			
Conservative notional hold		Swing		–7.23	
Source: Elections Canada

2021 Canadian federal election: Kamloops—Thompson—Cariboo
Party	Candidate	Votes	%	±%	Expenditures
Conservative	Frank Caputo	30,281	42.98	–1.76	$105,275.30
New Democratic	Bill Sundhu	20,431	29.00	+15.29	$112,540.75
Liberal	Jesse McCormick	12,717	18.05	–9.16	$37,784.53
People's	Corally Delwo	4,033	5.72	+4.16	$7,670.66
Green	Iain Currie	2,576	3.66	–8.47	$19,210.54
Independent	Bob O'Brien	264	0.37	–	none listed
Independent	Wayne Allan	146	0.21	–	none listed
Total valid votes/expense limit		70,448	99.54	–	$149,567.00
Total rejected ballots		324	0.46	+0.03	
Turnout		70,772	65.81	–4.12	
Eligible voters		107,548			
Conservative hold		Swing		–	
Source: Elections Canada
