= Dane Lloyd =

Canadian politician (born 1991)

Dane Lloyd MP

Member of Parliament for Parkland
- Incumbent
- Assumed office April 28, 2025
- Preceded by: Riding created

Member of Parliament for Sturgeon River—Parkland
- In office October 23, 2017 – April 28, 2025
- Preceded by: Rona Ambrose
- Succeeded by: Riding abolished

Personal details
- Born: February 16, 1991 (age 35) St. Albert, Alberta, Canada
- Party: Conservative
- Spouse: Raechel Lloyd
- Children: Brooke Lloyd, Alexander Lloyd
- Education: Trinity Western University (BA)

Military service
- Allegiance: Canada
- Branch/service: Canadian Army Reserve
- Rank: Captain
- Unit: Governor General's Foot Guards

Dane Lloyd MP (born February 16, 1991) is a Canadian politician who was elected to the House of Commons of Canada in a by-election on October 23, 2017, following the resignation of Rona Ambrose. Lloyd represents the constituency of Parkland as a member of the Conservative Party of Canada. Lloyd continues to serve as a Canadian Army reservist in the Governor General's Foot Guards located in Ottawa. As of 2024 he held a commission as an infantry officer with the rank of captain.

== Early life ==
Lloyd was born in St. Albert, Alberta, and raised outside Spruce Grove, Alberta, where his family farms. He attended and graduated from Edmonton Christian High School in 2009. In 2014, he graduated from Trinity Western University with a Bachelor of Arts degree in history and political science. While completing his undergraduate studies, Lloyd was elected vice president of Academic Affairs for the Trinity Western University Student Association. He attended the Laurentian Leadership Centre in Ottawa, and served as President of the Trinity Western Model United Nations Society.

== Career ==
Lloyd began his political career as an intern serving in the office of MP Brent Rathgeber in 2009. The following year he served in the office of Tony Clement then Minister of Industry. His final internship in the fall of 2011 through the Laurentian Leadership Centre was in the office of Jason Kenney when he served as Minister of Citizenship and Immigration. In 2013 before completing his degree Lloyd moved from Alberta to Ottawa and served as a special assistant to then Minister of International Trade (Ed Fast). After the 2015 election Lloyd accepted a position as parliamentary advisor to St. Albert—Edmonton MP Michael Cooper. In early 2016, Lloyd accepted a commission as an infantry officer in the Governor General's Foot Guards.

=== Political career ===
After he won the by-election in Sturgeon River—Parkland in the fall of 2017, Lloyd served on several Parliamentary Committees including the Standing Committee on Industry, Science and Technology; the Special Committee on the COVID-19 pandemic; and the Standing Committee on Veterans Affairs. Lloyd currently serves on the Standing Committee on Public Safety and National Security

In 2020, Conservative leader Erin O'Toole appointed Lloyd as Shadow Minister for Digital Government. Following the 2021 election Lloyd was appointed as Shadow Minister for Emergency Preparedness.

On 25 February 2022 interim leader Candice Bergen re-named Lloyd to shadow the Minister of Emergency Preparedness.

On October 12, 2022, Conservative Leader Pierre Poilievre re-appointed Lloyd to the position of Shadow Minister of Emergency Preparedness, a position he holds to this day.

Federal ridings in Alberta were redistributed prior to the 2025 federal election; Lloyd was re-elected to parliament in the newly created Parkland riding.

==== Legislative initiatives ====
During his nomination for the Conservative Party of Canada in 2017, Lloyd proposed introducing McCanns' Law in honour of St. Albert residents Lyle and Marie McCann who went missing in July 2010 on a road trip from their home town to Chilliwack, British Columbia. Their charred motor home was discovered a few days later, resulting in a search that led to the arrest (and subsequent conviction) of Travis Vader for their murder. While Vader was still unwilling to assist authorities in locating the McCanns' remains he will be eligible for parole in 2021. This was the catalyst for Lloyd's commitment, in the 2017 Sturgeon River-Parkland Conservative Nomination, to introduce a Private Member's Bill that would help families recover the remains of their loved ones. The McCann's oldest son, Bret McCann, worked with Lloyd in drafting of the bill after he was elected.

In March 2019, Lloyd introduced Private Member's Bill C-437, An Act to amend the Criminal Code, the Corrections and Conditional Release Act and the Prisons and Reformatories Act, also known as McCanns' Law. If passed, willingness to assist authorities to locate the remains of the victim(s) would be a consideration for parole eligibility for someone convicted in the death of a person. According to Lloyd "the hope is not to necessarily punish people more, but to give them (an) incentive to cooperate, to give relevant information on the location of the bodies and then enable the families to have the closure of a funeral."

==== Emergencies Act investigation ====
In the wake of the 2022 Freedom Convoy protest and crackdown, the SECU committee held a number of investigatory meetings. Lloyd attracted attention when he "grilled" interim Ottawa police chief Steve Bell over the conduct of his force during the event. Lloyd was persistent on the question "about whether loaded firearms were found in protesters' vehicles", to which Bell answered "there have been no charges laid to date in relation to weapons at the occupation site". Lloyd then accused a Toronto Star journalist, Justin Ling, and Minister of Crown–Indigenous Relations Marc Miller of spreading misinformation.

On 13 April 2022 Lloyd returned to this subject when pressed by the Western Standard:

We've seen from levels from police sources, from the media, from even members of the government claiming that, you know, the truckers were committing acts of arson, that they had found firearms, and yet, when we really delve down and asked the questions and looked for the evidence, we're finding out the story is a lot different than what we were told... All throughout these protests, and in the aftermath, Justin Trudeau and the government have been saying, you know, 'misinformation, disinformation is a threat to our democracy,' that the truckers were spreading lies and the protesters were spreading misinformation, and yet, we see that in the media, in some cases, was also spreading misinformation... The fact that no public notification was made, leads me to believe, well, I think definitively, that there were no firearms found in the first place... Despite this total lack of evidence [some are] trying to spin this tale that there were all these firearms in downtown Ottawa... We had allegedly (sic) police sources telling media that firearms had been found, we had members of the government retweeting information that firearms had been found, we saw police intelligence claiming that they had evidence that firearms were coming into downtown Ottawa, that foreign funding was flooding in, that it was overwhelmingly foreign funding from dark web sources... And yet, every time we've asked the experts, whether it's GoFundMe, whether it's the chief of police in this case; every time we've asked them to corroborate these claims, they haven't been able to.

On 19 May 2022 Lloyd asked Minister for Public Safety Marco Mendicino about the need for the invocation of the Emergencies Act. Mendicino said he "stands by previous statements that the federal government invoked the Emergencies Act on the recommendation of law enforcement officials." The "previous statements" were in witness testimony that Mendicino made at a committee hearing in April, to wit that the government "invoked the act because it was the advice of non-partisan professional law enforcement that the existing authorities were ineffective at the time to restore public safety".

== Controversies ==
=== Canadian NRA ===
In 2009, at the age of 18 he announced his intention on Facebook to create a National Rifle Association of Canada. However, during his October 2017 by-election campaign, Lloyd stated that his views had changed since 2009; he now favours a "commitment to cost-effective gun control programs designed to keep guns out of the hands of criminals while respecting the rights of law-abiding Canadians to own and use firearms responsibly."

=== Feminazis ===
Lloyd used the term 'feminazis' while commenting on a Facebook post regarding Guelph University's 2009 decision to close its women studies program. It was something he since regretted saying; Lloyd said in October 2017 that it "is not a term he would use today".

=== On the removal of historical monuments ===
In 2015 he commented on a Facebook post referencing an article from the Russia Today website opposing the removal of a 1945 memorial to Confederate General Robert E. Lee from a park in Baltimore, stating that despite being on the wrong side of the Civil War "his actions at the end of the war did much to heal and unite a deeply divided nation".

== Personal life ==
Lloyd is married to Raechel and has three children. He attends a Baptist Church in St. Albert, Alberta, and worships regularly with the Anglican Diocese of Canada denomination when he is in Ottawa. At the time of the 2025 Canadian federal election, he lived in Stony Plain, Alberta.

== Electoral record ==
2025 Canadian federal election: Parkland
Party	Candidate	Votes	%	±%	Expenditures
Conservative	Dane Lloyd	53,468	75.19	+12.10	$89,894.86
Liberal	Ashley Fearnall	12,690	17.85	+11.61	$4,728.85
New Democratic	Keri Goad	2,949	4.15	–12.13	$831.88
People's	Jason Lavigne	1,066	1.50	–9.78	$11,267.27
Green	Daniel Birrell	449	0.63	–	none listed
United	Wade Klassen	287	0.40	–	$1,323.59
Christian Heritage	Kevin Schulthies	198	0.28	–0.20	$332.95
Total valid votes/expense limit		71,107	99.44	–	$144,325.84
Total rejected ballots		398	0.56	–	
Turnout		71,505	74.80	–	
Eligible voters		95,600			
Conservative notional hold		Swing		+0.25	
Source: Elections Canada

2021 Canadian federal election: Sturgeon River—Parkland
Party	Candidate	Votes	%	±%	Expenditures
Conservative	Dane Lloyd	40,957	61.61	–15.93	$64,834.73
New Democratic	Kendra Mills	12,532	18.85	+8.74	$954.45
People's	Murray MacKinnon	6,671	10.04	+7.67	$10,181.25
Liberal	Irene Walker	4,579	6.89	+0.05	$2,023.58
Maverick	Jeff Dunham	1,240	1.87	–	$8,119.77
Christian Heritage	Jeffrey Willerton	497	0.75	+0.14	$11,257.72
Total valid votes/expense limit		66,476	99.50	–	$122,026.85
Total rejected ballots		331	0.50	+0.04	
Turnout		66,807	69.79	–3.36	
Eligible voters		95,719			
Conservative hold		Swing		–12.34	
Source: Elections Canada

2019 Canadian federal election: Sturgeon River—Parkland
Party	Candidate	Votes	%	±%	Expenditures
Conservative	Dane Lloyd	53,235	77.54	+0.17	$58,349.16
New Democratic	Guy Desforges	6,940	10.11	+2.40	$1,087.50
Liberal	Ronald Brochu	4,696	6.84	–5.19	$4,619.56
Green	Cass Romyn	1,745	2.54	–	$3,311.72
People's	Tyler Beauchamp	1,625	2.37	–	$2,017.99
Christian Heritage	Ernest Chauvet	416	0.61	–2.29	$4,500.34
Total valid votes/expense limit		68,657	99.54	–	$117,515.90
Total rejected ballots		314	0.46	+0.24	
Turnout		68,971	73.15	+49.47	
Eligible voters		94,282			
Conservative hold		Swing		+2.68	
Source: Elections Canada

Canadian federal by-election, 2017: Sturgeon River—Parkland Resignation of Rona Ambrose
Party	Candidate	Votes	%	±%	Expenditures
Conservative	Dane Lloyd	16,125	77.37	+7.13	$52,032.98
Liberal	Brian Gold	2,508	12.03	–3.55	$30,577.31
New Democratic	Shawna Gawreluck	1,606	7.71	–2.31	$4,065.06
Christian Heritage	Ernest Chauvet	603	2.89	+1.77	$11,920.86
Total valid votes/expense limit		20,842	99.78	–	$109,599.82
Total rejected ballots		45	0.22	–0.03	
Turnout		20,887	23.68	–47.24	
Eligible voters		88,218			
Conservative hold		Swing		+5.34	
Source: Elections Canada
