= Kamloops—Thompson—Cariboo =

Former federal electoral district in British Columbia, Canada

British Columbia electoral district
- Kamloops—Thompson—Cariboo in relation to other British Columbia federal electoral districts
- Coordinates: 51.552°N 120.434°W

Federal electoral district
- Legislature: House of Commons
- District created: 2003
- District abolished: 2023
- First contested: 2004
- Last contested: 2021
- District webpage: profile, map

Demographics
- Population (2016): 124,358
- Electors (2019): 104,054
- Area (km²): 38,320
- Census division(s): Cariboo, Thompson-Nicola
- Census subdivision(s): Kamloops, Clearwater, 100 Mile House, Barriere, Cariboo G, Cariboo L, Thompson-Nicola P (Rivers and the Peaks), Thompson-Nicola A (Wells Gray Country), Thompson-Nicola L, Thompson-Nicola O (Lower North Thompson)

Kamloops—Thompson—Cariboo (formerly known as Kamloops—Thompson) is a former federal electoral district in the province of British Columbia, Canada, that has been represented in the House of Commons of Canada from 2004 to 2025. While the riding covers a large area, about three quarters of the population in the district live in the city of Kamloops.

== History ==
This district was created as Kamloops—Thompson in 2003 from Kamloops, Thompson and Highland Valleys riding and small parts of Cariboo—Chilcotin and Prince George—Bulkley Valley ridings.

In 2004, the district was renamed "Kamloops—Thompson—Cariboo".

The 2012 federal electoral boundaries redistribution concluded that the electoral boundaries of Kamloops—Thompson—Cariboo should be adjusted, and a modified electoral district of the same name will be contested in future elections. The redefined Kamloops—Thompson—Cariboo loses a portion of its current territory consisting of the community of Valemount and area to Prince George—Peace River—Northern Rockies but is otherwise unchanged. These new boundaries were legally defined in the 2013 representation order, which came into effect upon the call of the 42nd Canadian federal election, scheduled for October 2015.

Under the 2022 Canadian federal electoral redistribution the riding was replaced by Kamloops—Thompson—Nicola.

== Demographics ==
Panethnic groups in Kamloops—Thompson—Cariboo (2011−2021)
Panethnic group	2021		2016		2011	
Panethnic group	Pop.	%	Pop.	%	Pop.	%
European (Note: Statistic includes all persons that did not make up part of a visible minority or an indigenous identity.)	105,365	80.17%	100,180	82.86%	100,040	85.82%
Indigenous	14,565	11.08%	12,925	10.69%	10,155	8.71%
South Asian	4,655	3.54%	2,615	2.16%	2,100	1.8%
East Asian (Note: Statistic includes total responses of "Chinese", "Korean", and "Japanese" under visible minority section on census.)	2,730	2.08%	2,620	2.17%	2,405	2.06%
Southeast Asian (Note: Statistic includes total responses of "Filipino" and "Southeast Asian" under visible minority section on census.)	1,600	1.22%	1,035	0.86%	800	0.69%
African	1,180	0.9%	600	0.5%	280	0.24%
Latin American	540	0.41%	360	0.3%	170	0.15%
Middle Eastern (Note: Statistic includes total responses of "West Asian" and "Arab" under visible minority section on census.)	345	0.26%	295	0.24%	450	0.39%
Other (Note: Statistic includes total responses of "Visible minority, n.i.e." and "Multiple visible minorities" under visible minority section on census.)	440	0.33%	285	0.24%	160	0.14%
Total responses	131,425	97%	120,910	97.23%	116,565	98.27%
Total population	135,492	100%	124,358	100%	118,616	100%
Notes: Totals greater than 100% due to multiple origin responses. Demographics based on 2012 Canadian federal electoral redistribution riding boundaries.

== Members of Parliament ==
Parliament	Years	Member	Party
Kamloops—Thompson; Riding created from Kamloops, Thompson and Highland Valleys, Cariboo—Chilcotin and Prince George—Bulkley Valley
38th	2004–2006	Betty Hinton	Conservative
Kamloops—Thompson—Cariboo
39th	2006–2008	Betty Hinton	Conservative
40th	2008–2011	Cathy McLeod	Conservative
41st	2011–2015	Cathy McLeod	Conservative
42nd	2015–2019	Cathy McLeod	Conservative
43rd	2019–2021	Cathy McLeod	Conservative
44th	2021–2025	Frank Caputo	Conservative
Riding dissolved into Cariboo—Prince George, Kamloops—Shuswap—Central Rockies, and Kamloops—Thompson—Nicola

=== Current member of Parliament ===
Its member of Parliament is Frank Caputo, a former Crown prosecutor who was elected for the first time in the 2021 election. He is a member of the Conservative Party of Canada.

== Election results ==
Graph of election results in Kamloops—Thompson, and Kamloops—Thompson—Cariboo (minor parties that never got 2% of the vote or didn't run consistently are omitted)

=== Kamloops–Thompson–Cariboo, 2004–present ===
Graph of election results in Kamloops—Thompson—Cariboo (minor parties that never got 2% of the vote or didn't run consistently are omitted)

2021 Canadian federal election
Party	Candidate	Votes	%	±%	Expenditures
Conservative	Frank Caputo	30,281	42.98	–1.76	$105,275.30
New Democratic	Bill Sundhu	20,431	29.00	+15.29	$112,540.75
Liberal	Jesse McCormick	12,717	18.05	–9.16	$37,784.53
People's	Corally Delwo	4,033	5.72	+4.16	$7,670.66
Green	Iain Currie	2,576	3.66	–8.47	$19,210.54
Independent	Bob O'Brien	264	0.37	–	none listed
Independent	Wayne Allan	146	0.21	–	none listed
Total valid votes/expense limit		70,448	99.54	–	$149,567.00
Total rejected ballots		324	0.46	+0.03	
Turnout		70,772	65.81	–4.12	
Eligible voters		107,548			
Conservative hold		Swing		–	
Source: Elections Canada

2019 Canadian federal election
Party	Candidate	Votes	%	±%	Expenditures
Conservative	Cathy McLeod	32,415	44.74	+9.49	$108,473.22
Liberal	Terry Lake	19,716	27.21	–3.20	$79,264.65
New Democratic	Cynthia Egli	9,936	13.71	–17.06	$31,291.00
Green	Iain Currie	8,789	12.13	+8.56	$66,820.29
People's	Ken Finlayson	1,132	1.56	–	$7,402.62
Animal Protection	Kira Cheeseborough	321	0.44	–	$1,599.00
Communist	Peter Kerek	144	0.20	–	$1,257.59
Total valid votes/expense limit		72,453	99.57	–	$142,800.35
Total rejected ballots		311	0.43	+0.18	
Turnout		72,764	69.93	–3.42	
Eligible voters		104,054			
Conservative hold		Swing		+6.34	
Source: Elections Canada

2015 Canadian federal election
Party	Candidate	Votes	%	±%	Expenditures
Conservative	Cathy McLeod	24,595	35.25	–17.04	$151,162.59
New Democratic	Bill Sundhu	21,466	30.77	–6.17	$153,060.21
Liberal	Steve Powrie	21,215	30.41	+25.05	$38,402.70
Green	Matthew Greenwood	2,489	3.57	–1.52	$1,761.67
Total valid votes/expense limit		69,765	99.75	–	$271,469.66
Total rejected ballots		174	0.25	–	
Turnout		69,939	73.35	–	
Eligible voters		95,347			
Conservative hold		Swing		–5.43	
Source: Elections Canada

2011 federal election redistributed results
Party	Vote	%
Conservative	29,280	52.29
New Democratic	20,682	36.94
Liberal	3,001	5.36
Green	2,847	5.08
Others	185	0.33

2011 Canadian federal election
Party	Candidate	Votes	%	±%	Expenditures
Conservative	Cathy McLeod	29,682	52.24	+6.09	$94,428.25
New Democratic	Michael Crawford	20,983	36.93	+1.04	$75,480.45
Liberal	Murray Todd	3,026	5.33	–4.52	$28,096.83
Green	Donovan Michael Cavers	2,932	5.16	–2.95	$1,580.89
Christian Heritage	Chris Kempling	191	0.34	–	none listed
Total valid votes/expense limit		56,814	99.71	–	$111,901.57
Total rejected ballots		164	0.29	+0.04	
Turnout		56,978	62.71	+0.69	
Eligible voters		90,855			
Conservative hold		Swing		+2.52	
Source: Elections Canada

2008 Canadian federal election
Party	Candidate	Votes	%	±%	Expenditures
Conservative	Cathy McLeod	25,209	46.16	+6.88	$81,714.02
New Democratic	Michael Crawford	19,601	35.89	+5.11	$73,197.23
Liberal	Ken Sommerfeld	5,375	9.84	–15.38	$52,966.48
Green	Donovan Grube Cavers	4,430	8.11	+3.39	$1,996.61
Total valid votes/expense limit		54,615	99.75	–	$107,718.13
Total rejected ballots		137	0.25	+0.06	
Turnout		54,752	62.02	–0.99	
Eligible voters		88,275			
Conservative hold		Swing		+0.89	
Source: Elections Canada

2006 Canadian federal election
Party	Candidate	Votes	%	±%	Expenditures
Conservative	Betty Hinton	20,948	39.27	–1.08	$50,690.98
New Democratic	Michael Crawford	16,417	30.78	+4.59	$33,621.33
Liberal	Ken Sommerfeld	13,454	25.22	–3.04	$41,261.42
Green	Matthew Greenwood	2,518	4.72	+0.39	$896.99
Total valid votes/expense limit		53,337	99.81	–	$98,387.78
Total rejected ballots		101	0.19	–	
Turnout		53,438	63.02	–	
Eligible voters		84,802			
Conservative hold		Swing		–2.84	
Source: Elections Canada

=== Kamloops–Thompson, 2003–2004 ===
2004 Canadian federal election: Kamloops—Thompson
Party	Candidate	Votes	%	Expenditures
Conservative	Betty Hinton	20,611	40.35	$50,158.11
Liberal	John O'Fee	14,434	28.26	$77,657.39
New Democratic	Brian Carroll	13,379	26.19	$54,444.97
Green	Grant Fraser	2,213	4.33	$3,649.84
Independent	Arjun Singh	440	0.86	$289.62
Total valid votes/expense limit		51,077	99.70	$94,499.64
Total rejected ballots		155	0.30	
Turnout		51,232	63.89	
Eligible voters		80,194		
Conservative notional hold		Swing		–
This riding was created from Kamloops, Thompson and Highland Valleys and parts of Cariboo—Chilcotin and Prince George—Bulkley Valley, all of which elected a Canadian Alliance candidate in the last election. Betty Hinton was the incumbent from Kamloops, Thompson and Highland Valleys.
Source: Elections Canada

== See also ==
- List of Canadian electoral districts
- Historical federal electoral districts of Canada
