= Sturgeon River—Parkland =

Federal electoral district in Alberta, Canada

Alberta electoral district
- Sturgeon River—Parkland in relation to other Alberta federal electoral districts as of the 2013 Representation Order

Defunct federal electoral district
- Legislature: House of Commons
- District created: 2013
- District abolished: 2023
- First contested: 2015
- Last contested: 2021
- District webpage: profile, map

Demographics
- Population (2016): 120,784
- Electors (2019): 92,965
- Area (km²): 3,982.274
- Census division(s): Division No. 11, Division No. 13
- Census subdivision(s): Alexander 134, Birch Cove, Bon Accord, Enoch Cree Nation 135, Gibbons, Lac Ste. Anne, Legal, Morinville, Nakamun Park, Onoway, Parkland, Redwater, Sandy Beach, Spring Lake, Spruce Grove, Stony Plain, Sturgeon, Sunrise Beach

Sturgeon River—Parkland was a federal electoral district in the Edmonton Capital Region of northern Alberta, Canada, and was represented in the House of Commons of Canada from 2015 to 2025. It was created in 2012 from the electoral districts of Edmonton—Spruce Grove (61%), Westlock—St. Paul (33%) and Yellowhead (6%).

It was essentially the suburban portion of Edmonton—Spruce Grove. That riding's MP, Rona Ambrose of the Conservative Party of Canada, opted to transfer there, and won easily. She was interim leader of the Tories, and hence Leader of the Opposition, until her resignation in May 2017. She retired from politics two months later, and Dane Lloyd easily retained it for the Conservatives in the by-election.

== History ==
The riding was originally intended to be named Sturgeon River.

Under the 2022 Canadian federal electoral redistribution, the riding was replaced by St. Albert—Sturgeon River and Parkland for the 2025 election.

== Demographics ==
According to the 2016 Canadian census or 2011 Canadian census

Languages: 91.0% English, 3.1% French, 1.3% German (2016)
Religions: 65.8% Christian, 0.6% Traditional (Aboriginal) spirituality, 0.6% Muslim, 0.7% other, 32.3% none (2011)
Median income: $47,406 (2015)

Panethnic groups in Sturgeon River—Parkland (2011−2021)
Panethnic group	2021		2016		2011	
Panethnic group	Pop.	%	Pop.	%	Pop.	%
European (Note: Statistic includes all persons that did not make up part of a visible minority or an indigenous identity.)	103,015	83.87%	102,370	86.17%	92,635	88.68%
Indigenous	12,740	10.37%	11,600	9.76%	8,355	8%
Southeast Asian (Note: Statistic includes total responses of "Filipino" and "Southeast Asian" under visible minority section on census.)	2,485	2.02%	1,795	1.51%	915	0.88%
South Asian	1,300	1.06%	585	0.49%	655	0.63%
African	1,285	1.05%	730	0.61%	610	0.58%
East Asian (Note: Statistic includes total responses of "Chinese", "Korean", and "Japanese" under visible minority section on census.)	915	0.74%	595	0.5%	580	0.56%
Latin American	505	0.41%	530	0.45%	270	0.26%
Middle Eastern (Note: Statistic includes total responses of "West Asian" and "Arab" under visible minority section on census.)	230	0.19%	340	0.29%	315	0.3%
Other/multiracial (Note: Statistic includes total responses of "Visible minority, n.i.e." and "Multiple visible minorities" under visible minority section on census.)	370	0.3%	250	0.21%	135	0.13%
Total responses	122,820	98.37%	118,795	98.36%	104,455	98.79%
Total population	124,849	100%	120,779	100%	105,733	100%
Notes: Totals greater than 100% due to multiple origin responses. Demographics based on 2012 Canadian federal electoral redistribution riding boundaries.

== Members of Parliament ==
This riding elected the following members of the House of Commons of Canada:

Parliament	Years	Member	Party
Sturgeon River—Parkland; Riding created from Edmonton—Spruce Grove, Westlock—St. Paul and Yellowhead
42nd	2015–2017	Rona Ambrose	Conservative
42nd	2017–2019	Dane Lloyd	Conservative
43rd	2019–2021	Dane Lloyd	Conservative
44th	2021–2025	Dane Lloyd	Conservative
Riding dissolved into Parkland and St. Albert—Sturgeon River

== Election results ==
Graph of election results in Sturgeon River—Parkland (minor parties that never got 2% of the vote or didn't run consistently are omitted)

2021 Canadian federal election
Party	Candidate	Votes	%	±%	Expenditures
Conservative	Dane Lloyd	40,957	61.61	–15.93	$64,834.73
New Democratic	Kendra Mills	12,532	18.85	+8.74	$954.45
People's	Murray MacKinnon	6,671	10.04	+7.67	$10,181.25
Liberal	Irene Walker	4,579	6.89	+0.05	$2,023.58
Maverick	Jeff Dunham	1,240	1.87	–	$8,119.77
Christian Heritage	Jeffrey Willerton	497	0.75	+0.14	$11,257.72
Total valid votes/expense limit		66,476	99.50	–	$122,026.85
Total rejected ballots		331	0.50	+0.04	
Turnout		66,807	69.79	–3.36	
Eligible voters		95,719			
Conservative hold		Swing		–12.34	
Source: Elections Canada

2019 Canadian federal election
Party	Candidate	Votes	%	±%	Expenditures
Conservative	Dane Lloyd	53,235	77.54	+0.17	$58,349.16
New Democratic	Guy Desforges	6,940	10.11	+2.40	$1,087.50
Liberal	Ronald Brochu	4,696	6.84	–5.19	$4,619.56
Green	Cass Romyn	1,745	2.54	–	$3,311.72
People's	Tyler Beauchamp	1,625	2.37	–	$2,017.99
Christian Heritage	Ernest Chauvet	416	0.61	–2.29	$4,500.34
Total valid votes/expense limit		68,657	99.54	–	$117,515.90
Total rejected ballots		314	0.46	+0.24	
Turnout		68,971	73.15	+49.47	
Eligible voters		94,282			
Conservative hold		Swing		+2.68	
Source: Elections Canada

Canadian federal by-election, 2017 Resignation of Rona Ambrose
Party	Candidate	Votes	%	±%	Expenditures
Conservative	Dane Lloyd	16,125	77.37	+7.13	$52,032.98
Liberal	Brian Gold	2,508	12.03	–3.55	$30,577.31
New Democratic	Shawna Gawreluck	1,606	7.71	–2.31	$4,065.06
Christian Heritage	Ernest Chauvet	603	2.89	+1.77	$11,920.86
Total valid votes/expense limit		20,842	99.78	–	$109,599.82
Total rejected ballots		45	0.22	–0.03	
Turnout		20,887	23.68	–47.24	
Eligible voters		88,218			
Conservative hold		Swing		+5.34	
Source: Elections Canada

2015 Canadian federal election
Party	Candidate	Votes	%	±%	Expenditures
Conservative	Rona Ambrose	43,220	70.23	–7.26	$98,166.59
Liberal	Travis Dueck	9,586	15.58	+10.11	$258.78
New Democratic	Guy Desforges	6,166	10.02	–2.95	$7,730.56
Green	Brendon Greene	1,875	3.05	–0.95	$3,593.60
Christian Heritage	Ernest Chauvet	690	1.12	–	$10,477.93
Total valid votes/expense limit		61,537	99.75	–	$222,470.71
Total rejected ballots		157	0.25	–	
Turnout		61,694	70.92	–	
Eligible voters		86,994			
Conservative hold		Swing		–8.68	
Source: Elections Canada

2011 federal election redistributed results
Party	Vote	%
Conservative	33,791	77.49
New Democratic	5,655	12.97
Liberal	2,384	5.47
Green	1,742	3.99
Libertarian	35	0.08

== See also ==
- List of Canadian electoral districts
- Historical federal electoral districts of Canada
