= Sexual assault training for judges in Canada =

Sexual assault training for judges in Canada is a mandatory sexual assault training for federally appointed judges under the Canadian federal and provincial governments as response to recent events and a growing amount of media attention. Federally, Bill C-337 was introduced by Rona Ambrose, then-interim Conservative leader, in 2017 as a response to national outrage against Robin Camp, an Alberta judge who resigned from the Federal Court in 2018 after allegations of mishandling a sexual assault case heard in his court.

Some provinces, like Prince Edward Island have also adopted legislative initiatives to introduce mandatory sexual assault training for provincial judges. There have also been non-governmental efforts to spread the prevalence sexual assault education to Canadian judges.

== History ==
Canadian studies conducted on sexual assault allegations found that incidents of sexual assault are consistently under-reported, under-investigated, and under-convicted. Data reported that one in five sexual assault allegations in Canada are dismissed by Canadian law enforcement as unfounded. Findings from the 2014 General Social Survey on Victimization find that 83% of sexual assaults remain unreported, and that those participating in the survey cited distrust of the police, the court, and the criminal justice system as barriers to reporting. In 2014/2015, less than half of all sexual assault trials resulted in a conviction, and of those convictions, 57% resulted in a custodial sentence, and 18% resulted in probation.

In Canada, criticisms that judges re-victimize complainants by relying on stereotypes and rape myths during criminal proceedings and decisions have led to calls for judges to become more thoroughly informed and trained on how to proceed in such trials.

== Current policies ==
=== Canadian Federal Government ===
Bill C-337, An Act to amend the Judges Act and the Criminal Code, also known as the Judicial Accountability through Sexual Assault Law Training Act or the JUST Act, was proposed in February 2017 by Ambrose as an attempt to improve public confidence in the Canadian criminal justice system. Although the bill passed unanimously in the House of Commons in 2017, it died on the floor of the Senate in 2019 as the Senate retired before the 2019 federal election. As Bill C-337 was a private members bill, other governmental bills took precedent.

Bill C-337 intended to amend the Judges Act in order to ensure those judges selected for judicial appointment had previously completed sexual assault law and social context education. Furthermore, it ensured that judges would be held accountable for their actions, mandating that the Canadian Judicial Council regularly reported on education seminars and that judges provided rational for their decisions on sexual assault cases. Although the bill did not pass in 2019, the Liberal, Conservative, NDP and Green parties have all committed to supporting the re-introduction of the bill as a government bill in the new Senate session.

=== Prince Edward Island ===
In Prince Edward Island, Bill 110, the Mandatory Sexual Assault Law Education Act, was introduced and subsequently passed. This amendment prohibits judges who have not completed recent and comprehensive sexual assault education from appointment as lawyers. In an effort to increase transparency, this law also mandated that plans for this sexual assault education are available to the public. This bill was introduced by Conservative MLA Jamie Fox. It received Royal Assent on December 5, 2018.

==== Non-Governmental Efforts ====
The National Judicial Institute has introduced a week-long course, provided to all Supreme Court justices who have begun placements within the last five years. This course is meant to deal with the social and legal aspects of a criminal trial focusing on sexual assault allegations. The National Judicial Institute is an independent body that consistently supplies education to judges across Canada.
