= Edmonton—Spruce Grove =

Former federal electoral district in Alberta, Canada

Coordinates: 53.482°N 113.715°W

Alberta electoral district
- Edmonton–Spruce Grove in relation to other federal electoral districts in Edmonton

Defunct federal electoral district
- Legislature: House of Commons
- District created: 2003
- District abolished: 2013
- First contested: 2004
- Last contested: 2011
- District webpage: profile, map

Demographics
- Population (2011): 151,389
- Electors (2011): 99,397
- Area (km²): 1,009.36
- Census division: Division No. 11
- Census subdivision(s): Edmonton, Parkland County, Spruce Grove, Stony Plain

Edmonton—Spruce Grove was a federal electoral district in Alberta, Canada, that was represented in the House of Commons of Canada from 2004 to 2015. It was a suburban riding in Edmonton.

The electoral district was created in 2003 from St. Albert, Edmonton Southwest, and Edmonton West ridings. It was abolished in 2013. Most of the Edmonton portion became part of a recreated Edmonton West, with a small portion transferring to Edmonton Centre. The suburban portion became part of Sturgeon River—Parkland.

== Member of Parliament ==
This riding elected the following members of Parliament:

Parliament	Years	Member	Party
Riding created from St. Albert, Edmonton Southwest and Edmonton West
38th	2004–2006	Rona Ambrose	Conservative
39th	2006–2008	Rona Ambrose	Conservative
40th	2008–2011	Rona Ambrose	Conservative
41st	2011–2015	Rona Ambrose	Conservative
Riding dissolved into Sturgeon River—Parkland, Edmonton West and Edmonton Centre

Its only Member of Parliament for the duration of the riding's existence was Rona Ambrose, a former columnist and communication consultant, who was first elected to Parliament in the 2004 election as a member of the Conservative Party of Canada. She served as the Minister of Public Works and Government Services, Minister of the Environment, Minister of Intergovernmental Affairs, Minister of Labour, Minister responsible for the Status of Women, Minister of Western Economic Diversification, President of the Queen's Privy Council for Canada, and Minister of Health most recently. In the 2004-2005 parliamentary session, she served as a member of the Legislative Committee on Bill C-38, Standing Committee on Finance, Standing Committee on Foreign Affairs and International Trade, and the Subcommittee on Fiscal Imbalance of the Standing Committee on Finance.

After the riding was dissolved in 2013, Ambrose went on to seek election in the new riding of Sturgeon River—Parkland in 2015, which she won.

== Election results ==
2011 Canadian federal election
Party	Candidate	Votes	%	±%	Expenditures
Conservative	Rona Ambrose	41,782	71.10	+2.55	$86,571.03
New Democratic	Catherine Chaulk-Stokes	9,272	15.78	+3.30	$37.50
Liberal	Chris Austin	5,483	9.33	–2.16	$15,313.46
Green	Joshua Lund	2,232	3.80	–3.69	none listed
Total valid votes/expense limit		58,769	99.75	–	$103,619.53
Total rejected ballots		146	0.25	+0.08	
Turnout		58,915	55.79	+2.27	
Eligible voters		105,599			
Conservative hold		Swing		–0.38	
Source: Elections Canada

2008 Canadian federal election
Party	Candidate	Votes	%	±%	Expenditures
Conservative	Rona Ambrose	36,402	68.55	+1.72	$90,163.03
New Democratic	Barb Phillips	6,627	12.48	+2.00	$10,318.31
Liberal	Chris Austin	6,099	11.49	–5.34	$21,010.42
Green	Wendy Walker	3,975	7.49	+1.63	none listed
Total valid votes/expense limit		53,103	99.83	–	$97,140.69
Total rejected ballots		91	0.17	–0.02	
Turnout		53,194	53.52	–9.93	
Eligible voters		99,397			
Conservative hold		Swing		–0.14	
Source: Elections Canada

2006 Canadian federal election
Party	Candidate	Votes	%	±%	Expenditures
Conservative	Rona Ambrose	38,826	66.83	+6.43	$64,959.72
Liberal	Brad Enge	9,776	16.83	–8.75	$17,576.93
New Democratic	Jason Rockwell	6,091	10.48	+1.56	$5,315.48
Green	John Lackey	3,404	5.86	+0.77	$2,099.23
Total valid votes/expense limit		58,097	99.81	–	$86,746.55
Total rejected ballots		109	0.19	–0.02	
Turnout		58,206	63.45	+3.12	
Eligible voters		91,735			
Conservative hold		Swing		+7.59	
Source: Elections Canada

2004 Canadian federal election
Party	Candidate	Votes	%	±%	Expenditures
Conservative	Rona Ambrose	30,497	60.40	+1.33	$68,293.40
Liberal	Neil Mather	12,912	25.57	–12.21	$64,775.96
New Democratic	Hayley Phillips	4,508	8.93	+5.63	$2,602.82
Green	Jerry Paschen	2,572	5.09	–	none listed
Total valid votes/expense limit		50,489	99.79	–	$80,416.80
Total rejected ballots		106	0.21	–	
Turnout		50,595	60.33	–	
Eligible voters		83,859			
Conservative notional hold		Swing		+6.77	
Source: Elections Canada

Note: Change based on redistributed results. Conservative vote is compared to the total of Progressive Conservative and Canadian Alliance vote in 2000.

2000 federal election redistributed results
Party	Vote	%
Canadian Alliance	26,461	55.84
Liberal	13,762	29.04
Progressive Conservative	4,577	9.66
New Democratic	2,298	4.85
Others	289	0.61

== See also ==
- List of Canadian electoral districts
- Historical federal electoral districts of Canada
