= Rona Ambrose =

Canadian politician (born 1969)

The Honourable Rona Ambrose PC
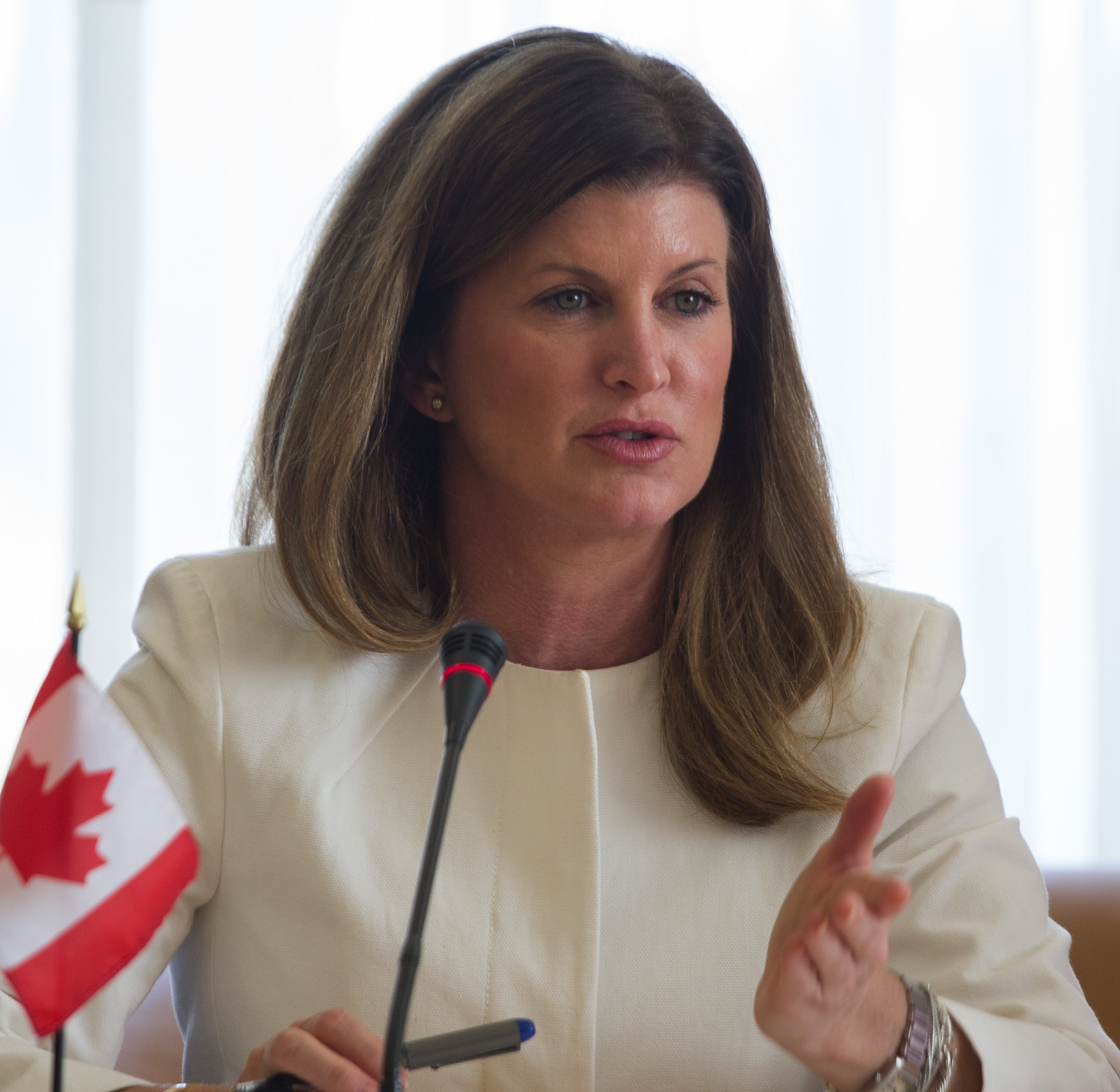
- Ambrose in 2014

Leader of the Opposition
- In office November 5, 2015 – May 27, 2017
- Deputy: Denis Lebel
- Preceded by: Tom Mulcair
- Succeeded by: Andrew Scheer

Interim leader of the Conservative Party
- In office November 5, 2015 – May 27, 2017
- Deputy: Denis Lebel
- Preceded by: Stephen Harper
- Succeeded by: Andrew Scheer

Minister of Health
- In office July 15, 2013 – November 4, 2015
- Prime Minister: Stephen Harper
- Preceded by: Leona Aglukkaq
- Succeeded by: Jane Philpott

Minister of Public Works and Government Services
- In office January 19, 2010 – July 15, 2013
- Prime Minister: Stephen Harper
- Preceded by: Christian Paradis
- Succeeded by: Diane Finley

Minister of Western Economic Diversification
- In office November 5, 2010 – May 18, 2011
- Prime Minister: Stephen Harper
- Preceded by: Jim Prentice
- Succeeded by: Lynne Yelich
- In office January 4, 2007 – October 29, 2008
- Prime Minister: Stephen Harper
- Preceded by: Carol Skelton
- Succeeded by: Jim Prentice

Minister of Labour
- In office October 30, 2008 – January 19, 2010
- Prime Minister: Stephen Harper
- Preceded by: Jean-Pierre Blackburn
- Succeeded by: Lisa Raitt

Minister of Intergovernmental Affairs
- In office January 4, 2007 – October 30, 2008
- Prime Minister: Stephen Harper
- Preceded by: Peter Van Loan
- Succeeded by: Josée Verner

President of the Privy Council
- In office January 4, 2007 – October 30, 2008
- Prime Minister: Stephen Harper
- Preceded by: Peter Van Loan
- Succeeded by: Josée Verner

Minister of the Environment
- In office February 6, 2006 – January 3, 2007
- Prime Minister: Stephen Harper
- Preceded by: Stéphane Dion
- Succeeded by: John Baird

Member of Parliament for Sturgeon River—Parkland (Edmonton—Spruce Grove; 2004–2015)
- In office June 28, 2004 – July 4, 2017
- Preceded by: Constituency established
- Succeeded by: Dane Lloyd

Personal details
- Born: Ronalee Chapchuk; March 15, 1969 (age 57) Valleyview, Alberta, Canada
- Party: Conservative
- Spouses: Bruce Ambrose (m. 1994; div. 2011) J. P. Veitch (m. 2015)
- Education: University of Victoria (BA); University of Alberta (MA)

Ronalee Ambrose Veitch PC (/ˈrɒnə ˈæmbroʊz/ RAW-nə AM-brohz, née Chapchuk; born March 15, 1969) is a former Canadian politician who served as leader of the Official Opposition and interim leader of the Conservative Party from 2015 to 2017. She was the member of Parliament (MP) for Sturgeon River—Parkland from 2015 to 2017, after previously representing Edmonton—Spruce Grove from 2004 to 2015.

Born in Valleyview, Alberta, Ambrose studied political science at the University of Victoria and later earned a master's degree in public policy from the University of Alberta. She worked as a communication and public policy consultant for the Alberta government before entering federal politics. First elected in the 2004 federal election, she served as the Conservative Party’s intergovernmental affairs critic during her first term in Opposition.

Under Prime Minister Stephen Harper, Ambrose held multiple cabinet positions between 2006 and 2015, including minister of the environment (2006–2007), minister of intergovernmental affairs (2007–2008), minister of western economic diversification (2008–2010), minister of labour (2010–2013), minister of public works and government services (2010–2013), minister of status of women (2010–2015), and minister of health (2013–2015). She also served as vice-chair of the Treasury Board and president of the Queen's Privy Council for Canada.

Following the Conservative Party’s defeat in the 2015 federal election, Ambrose was chosen as interim leader of the party and leader of the Official Opposition. She served in the role until 2017, when she announced her retirement from federal politics. After leaving office, she was appointed a visiting fellow at the Canada Institute at the Woodrow Wilson International Center for Scholars. Later that year, she was named to the Liberal government’s 13-member NAFTA advisory council to provide input on trade negotiations with the United States and Mexico.

== Early life and education ==
Ambrose was born Ronalee Chapchuk in Valleyview, Alberta, to Colleen (née Clark) and James Chapchuk. She spent parts of her childhood in Brazil and Parkland County, Alberta. In addition to English, she also speaks Portuguese and Spanish.

She earned a Bachelor of Arts in women's and gender studies from the University of Victoria and a Master of Arts in political science from the University of Alberta.

== Political views ==
Ambrose is a feminist. Before her work in Canadian federal politics, Ambrose's community service included involvement with organizations working to end violence against women, including the Status of Women Action Group, the Victoria Sexual Assault and Sexual Abuse Crisis Centre, and the Edmonton Women's Shelter.

Ambrose also calls herself a libertarian and enjoys Ayn Rand's novels, such as Atlas Shrugged and The Fountainhead. She was a member of the Trilateral Commission, an organization dedicated to closer cooperation between Europe, North America, and Japan.

== Political career ==
Ambrose was first elected to Parliament in the 2004 federal election for the newly created riding of Edmonton-Spruce Grove in west Edmonton.

On February 16, 2005, she made headlines after making a remark in Parliament directed at Liberal Social Development Minister Ken Dryden about the Liberal national child care plan: "Working women want to make their own choices; we don't need old white guys telling us what to do."

=== Environment Minister ===
In the 2006 elections, Ambrose successfully defended her seat in Edmonton–Spruce Grove with 66.8% of the vote in the riding. She was then appointed Environment Minister in Prime Minister Stephen Harper's minority government. Ambrose's appointment to the cabinet made her the youngest woman appointed to the cabinet at the time.

On April 7, 2006, Ambrose announced that Canada could not meet its targets under the Kyoto Protocol and must set more realistic goals for cutting greenhouse gases. "My departmental officials and the department officials from natural resources have indicated that Canada can't reach its Kyoto target. And let me be clear. I have been engaging with our international counterparts over the past month, and we are not the only country finding itself in this situation", said Ambrose.

On April 13, 2006, Ambrose stopped an Environment Canada scientist, Mark Tushingham, from speaking at the launch of his science fiction novel Hotter than Hell, set in a dystopian future caused by global warming. Tushingham's publisher and environmentalists believed this was because the book was not in line with the government's views on climate change. Still, Ambrose's spokesperson said the speech was billed as coming from an Environment Canada scientist speaking in an official capacity and thus out of the process.

On April 25, 2006, Ambrose expressed her support of the (now defunct) Asia-Pacific Partnership on Clean Development and Climate as an alternative to the Kyoto Protocol, because it includes China and India. These two large polluting nations are not bound by the latter agreement. The APP had voluntary emissions reduction targets and focused on developing technological solutions to climate change.

In May 2006, Ambrose criticized the previous Liberal government's failure to meet the high targets that they had negotiated at Kyoto, saying, "We would have to pull every truck and car off the street, shut down every train and ground every plane to reach the Kyoto target the Liberals negotiated for Canada."

In June 2006, opposition discontent over Ambrose's actions as environment minister prompted the NDP and the Bloc Québécois to try to table a motion in the Commons environmental committee calling for her resignation. The motion was blocked with the help of the Liberals after the Conservatives said that the motion would be a confidence motion, that if passed would trigger an election in the Fall of 2006.

In August 2006, she stated, "I welcome the commitment from British Columbia to preserve and increase the population of Northern Spotted Owls ... It is my opinion that, given the measures they are taking, such as stopping logging in areas currently occupied by the owls, there is no imminent threat to the survival or recovery of the Northern Spotted Owl at this time."

On October 19, 2006, Ambrose introduced a Clean Air Act that aimed to reduce greenhouse emissions starting in 2020, cutting them to about half of the 2003 levels by 2050. She also introduced other regulations to industries and vehicles and possible cooperation between the federal government and the provinces to create a system that would report air emissions. In an interview with the media, Ambrose denied that the Conservative government had withdrawn from the Kyoto Protocol despite its previous opposition. However, industries will have until 2010 before they are expected to reduce emissions, and the government will not have final (and voluntary) targets ready until 2020. Oil companies will have to reduce emissions on a per-barrel basis, a reduction proportional to production basis.

Ambrose attended the November 2006 United Nations Climate Change Conference in Nairobi, Kenya.

A few weeks before Ambrose was shuffled out from the environment portfolio, she told a parliamentary committee that Canada had paid its debts under the Kyoto Protocol only to have an Environment Canada official point out that the bill was still unpaid.

=== Western Economic Diversification and Intergovernmental Affairs ===
News stories of a possible Cabinet shuffle began to appear in late 2006 that included shifting Ambrose from her environment portfolio. As part of the January 4, 2007, cabinet shuffle, Ambrose was replaced as Environment Minister by John Baird and became Minister of Western Economic Diversification, Minister of Intergovernmental Affairs, and President of the Queen's Privy Council for Canada.

=== Minister of Labour and Minister of Public Works and Government Services ===
After winning reelection in the 2008 election, Ambrose was appointed Labour Minister on October 30, 2008. On January 19, 2010, Ambrose succeeded Christian Paradis and was appointed as the new Minister of Public Works and Government Services, where she introduced a major project to improve the way the government administers its pay and pension systems and "which will modernize service, introduce efficiencies, and improve our stewardship responsibilities in those areas." That system was to be the Phoenix Pay System.

=== Minister responsible for the Status of Women ===
On April 9, 2010, Ambrose was named Minister responsible for the Status of Women after Helena Guergis was dismissed from Cabinet.

The International Day of the Girl Child was formally proposed by Canada in the United Nations General Assembly as a resolution. Rona Ambrose, Canada's Minister for the Status of Women, sponsored the resolution; a delegation of women and girls made presentations supporting the initiative at the 55th United Nations Commission on the Status of Women. On December 19, 2011, the United Nations General Assembly voted to pass a resolution adopting October 11, 2012, as the inaugural International Day of the Girl Child.

On September 26, 2012, Ambrose voted in favour of Motion 312, a motion by Conservative MP Stephen Woodworth that would have directed a Commons committee to revisit the section of the Criminal Code defining at what point human life begins. Viewing the motion as an attempt to re-open the debate on abortion laws, Canadian pro-choice groups and Commons opposition parties considered her vote inconsistent with her ministerial role and prompted a call for her resignation. The motion was eventually voted down. Ambrose responded to her critics, stating her concern about discrimination against girls that is made possible by sex-selection abortion. Pro-Life groups praised Ambrose for supporting the Motion.

=== Minister of Health ===
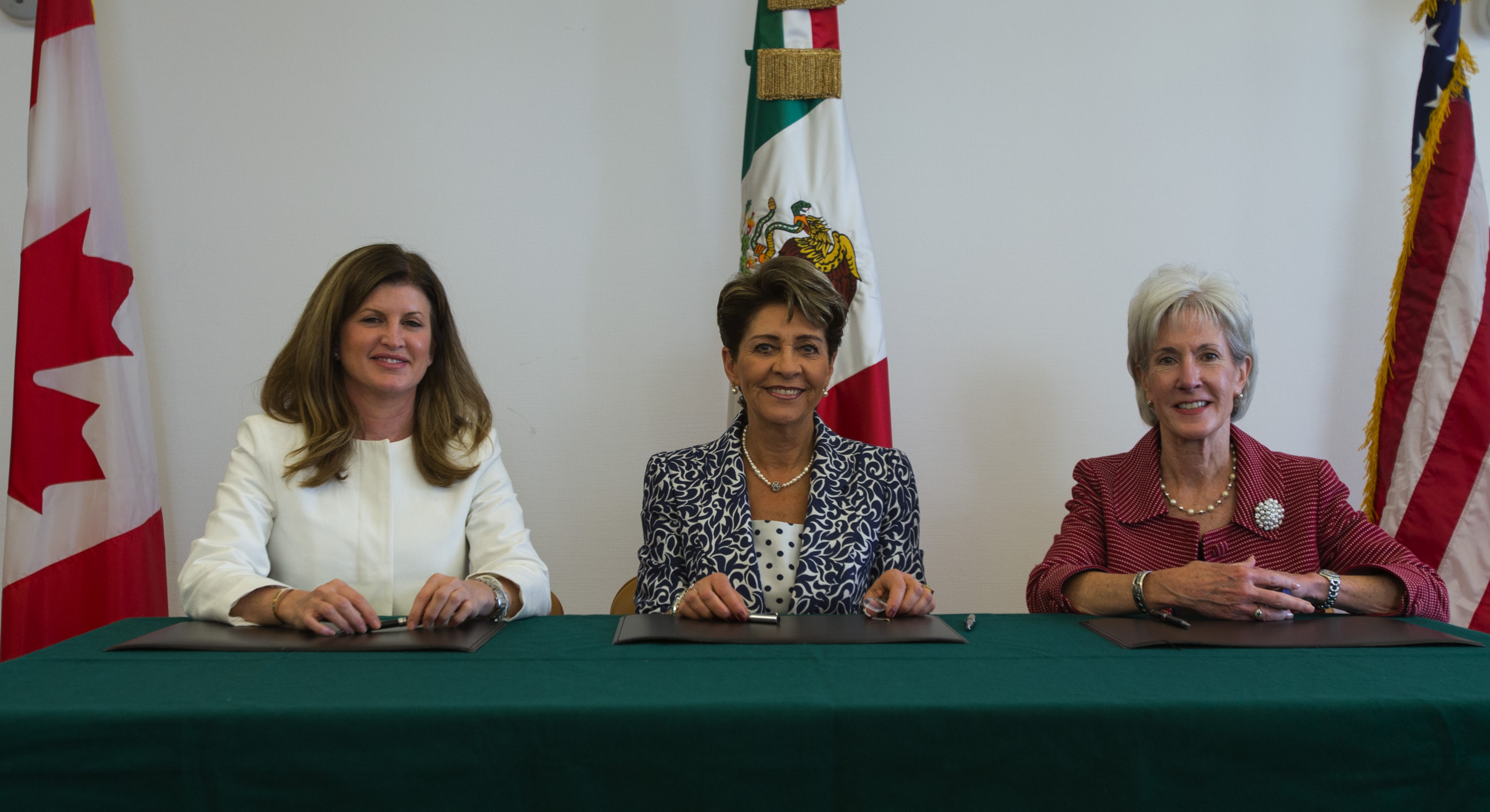
Ambrose at a Trilateral with Mercedes Juan López and Kathleen Sebelius in 2014

In July 2013, Stephen Harper appointed Rona Ambrose as Minister of Health and kept her as Minister of Western Economic Diversification.

While she was an MP, Ambrose worked closely with Nadia Murad, a Yazidi refugee and Nobel Peace Prize winner, in pushing the House of Commons to label the persecution of Yazidis a genocide. She also led the fight for a Canadian refugee program to bring Yazidi women and girls who have been sexually enslaved by ISIS to safety in Canada, which resulted in the rescue of over 1000 women and girls.

On June 11, 2015, she made headlines for being "outraged" that (in a unanimous decision) the Supreme Court of Canada expanded the definition of what constituted medical marijuana to include oils, teas, brownies, etc., from its previous limitation to dried leaves, arguing "Marijuana has never gone through the regulatory approval process at Health Canada, which requires rigorous safety reviews and clinical trials with scientific evidence."

When asked why the testing has not been done when people are taking medical marijuana every day, she responded, "It is not my job as Minister. If there is clinical evidence and a company decides ... to submit it to the regulatory approval process, it would be looked at. That has never happened."

=== Leader of the Opposition ===
Stephen Harper resigned as Conservative party leader after Liberals defeated the party in the 2015 election. Ambrose, who was elected in the new riding of Sturgeon River-Parkland—essentially the suburban portion of her old riding–announced that she would run for the interim leadership of the Conservative Party. She was elected to that post on November 5, 2015—becoming the third woman to hold the post.

Ambrose was the third female leader of Canada's major centre-right party. The first was former Prime Minister Kim Campbell, who led Canada's now-defunct Progressive Conservative Party of Canada, and the second was Deborah Grey, of the former Canadian Alliance. She is also the third woman to be Opposition Leader, after Grey and the NDP's Nycole Turmel. All three of them served in an interim capacity. Under the party constitution, as interim leader, she was not eligible to run for leadership at the subsequent Conservative Party of Canada leadership election.

On November 13, 2015, Ambrose responded to the terrorist attacks in Paris committed by the Islamic State of Iraq and the Levant. Ambrose stated, "The fight against ISIS (ISIL) requires a strong humanitarian response, but also a military response ... It's important that we remain resolute and support our allies."

Ambrose supports an inquiry into missing and murdered Indigenous women.

In February 2017, while still a sitting MP, Ambrose introduced Private Member's Bill C-337, An Act to amend the Judges Act and the Criminal Code, also known as the JUST Act. If passed, this bill would require judges in Canada to undergo training on sexual assault law, involving education on rape myths, stereotypes about victims, and the impact of trauma on memory. The JUST Act gained widespread support from experts and victim advocacy groups and was subsequently passed unanimously by the House of Commons. However, the bill did not pass a third reading in the Senate, as the Senate rose for Summer 2019 without voting on the JUST Act, resulting in the expiration of the order paper, as the order paper is wiped clean for the October 2019 federal election.

=== Resignation from Parliament ===
In May 2017, Ambrose announced to her caucus that she would leave federal politics at the end of the spring session of Parliament, in June 2017, several weeks after her successor as Conservative leader was chosen. Her seat was held for the Conservatives by Dane Lloyd, who won the by-election.

=== Post resignation ===
Ambrose has stated that though she supports the merger of the Progressive Conservative Association of Alberta and the Wildrose Party, she will not be a candidate for the leadership of the proposed new United Conservative Party of Alberta.

She joined the Canada Institute at the Woodrow Wilson International Center for Scholars, a Washington, D.C.–based think tank, as a visiting fellow focused on Canadian–American trade and to lead the organization's campaign to educate officials in both countries about the benefits of an integrated North American economy.

She was also appointed a member of the NAFTA advisory council set up by the Trudeau Liberal government in August 2017.

In 2018, Rona Ambrose and Laureen Harper, wife of former Canadian prime minister Stephen Harper, launched the She Leads Foundation. She Leads is a non-profit organization based in Alberta that encourages women to run for office and participate in public life. Alongside UN Women, Ambrose assisted in the launch of SHEInnovates Alberta, a campaign providing tools necessary to encourage women to seek leadership positions and innovation.

In May 2020, it was announced that Rona Ambrose had joined the board of directors of the e-cigarette company Juul.

Following Andrew Scheer's resignation after the Conservative loss in the 2019 Canadian federal election, Ambrose faced pressure from many prominent Conservatives to run for party leader in the 2020 leadership race. Ambrose announced she would not run for party leader in January 2020, during a Facebook livestream in the Alberta mountains.

== Personal life ==
Ambrose is married to J.P. Veitch, a private investment businessman and former rodeo bull rider. She was previously married to Bruce Ambrose from 1994 to 2011.

== Honours ==
- She was sworn in as Queen's Privy Council for Canada member on 6 February 2006. This gave her the honorific prefix "The Honourable" and the post nominal letters "PC" for life.
- In 2008, Ambrose was No. 17 on the Western Standard's "Liberty 100" top Canadian "pro-freedom activists, journalists, think-tankers and partisans."
- In 2012, she was awarded the Canadian version of the Queen Elizabeth II Diamond Jubilee Medal.

== Scholastic ==
Chancellor, visitor, governor, rector and fellowships

Location	Date	School	Position
Alberta	2020 – Present	The School of Public Policy at the University of Calgary	Distinguished Policy Fellow

=== Memberships and fellowships ===
Country	Date	Organisation	Position
District of Columbia	16 May 2017 – Present	The Canada Institute at the Woodrow Wilson International Center for Scholars	Visiting Global Fellow

== Electoral record ==
2015 Canadian federal election: Sturgeon River—Parkland
Party	Candidate	Votes	%	±%	Expenditures
Conservative	Rona Ambrose	43,220	70.23	−7.26	$98,166.59
Liberal	Travis Dueck	9,586	15.58	+10.11	$258.78
New Democratic	Guy Desforges	6,166	10.02	−2.95	$7,730.56
Green	Brendon Greene	1,875	3.05	−0.95	$3,593.60
Christian Heritage	Ernest Chauvet	690	1.12	–	$10,477.93
Total valid votes/Expense limit		61,537	100.00		$222,470.71
Total rejected ballots		157	0.25	–	
Turnout		61,694	70.91	–	
Eligible voters		86,994			
Conservative hold		Swing		−8.68	
Source: Elections Canada

2011 Canadian federal election: Edmonton—Spruce Grove
Party	Candidate	Votes	%	±%	Expenditures
Conservative	Rona Ambrose	41,782	71.10	+2.56	$88,882
New Democratic	Catherine Chaulk-Stokes	9,272	15.78	+3.30	$50
Liberal	Chris Austin	5,483	9.33	−2.17	$9,593
Green	Josh Lund	2,232	3.80	−3.68	$0
Total valid votes/Expense limit		58,769	100.00		
Total rejected ballots		146	0.25	+0.08	
Turnout		58,915	56.53	+3.01	
Eligible voters		104,226	–	–	

2008 Canadian federal election: Edmonton—Spruce Grove
Party	Candidate	Votes	%	±%	Expenditures
Conservative	Rona Ambrose	36,402	68.54	+1.71	$94,219
New Democratic	Barbara Phillips	6,627	12.48	+2.00	$10,939
Liberal	Chris Austin	6,099	11.50	−5.33	$20,611
Green	Wendy Walker	3,975	7.48	+1.62	
Total valid votes/Expense limit		53,103	100.00	$97,141	
Total rejected ballots		91	0.17	−0.02	
Turnout		53,194	53.52	−9.93	
Conservative hold		Swing		−0.1	

2006 Canadian federal election: Edmonton—Spruce Grove
Party	Candidate	Votes	%	±%	Expenditures
Conservative	Rona Ambrose	38,826	66.83	+6.43	$67,100
Liberal	Brad Enge	9,776	16.83	−8.74	$17,620
New Democratic	Jason Rockwell	6,091	10.48	+1.56	$5,315
Green	John Lackey	3,404	5.86	+0.77	$2,097
Total valid votes		58,097	100.00		
Total rejected ballots		109	0.19	−0.02	
Turnout		58,206	63.45	+3.12	

2004 Canadian federal election: Edmonton—Spruce Grove
Party	Candidate	Votes	%	±%	Expenditures
Conservative	Rona Ambrose	30,497	60.40	–	$73,732
Liberal	Neil Mather	12,912	25.57	–	$63,512
New Democratic	Hayley Phillips	4,508	8.92	–	$2,802
Green	Jerry Paschen	2,572	5.09	–	$154
Total valid votes		50,489	100.00		
Total rejected ballots		106	0.21		
Turnout		50,595	60.33		
