= Betty Hinton =

Canadian politician (born 1950)

Betty Zane Hinton

Assistant Deputy Chair of the Committees of the Whole
- In office February 2, 2004 – May 23, 2004
- Speaker: Peter Milliken
- Preceded by: Eleni Bakopanos
- Succeeded by: Jean Augustine

Member of Parliament for Kamloops—Thompson—Cariboo (Kamloops—Thompson; 2004–2006) (Kamloops, Thompson and Highland Valleys; 2000–2006)
- In office November 27, 2000 – October 14, 2008
- Preceded by: Nelson Riis
- Succeeded by: Cathy McLeod

Personal details
- Born: February 22, 1950 (age 76) Trail, British Columbia, Canada
- Party: Conservative
- Other political affiliations: Canadian Alliance (2000-2003)
- Spouse: James Hinton
- Profession: business manager

Betty Zane Hinton (born February 22, 1950) is a Canadian politician, previously representing the constituency of Kamloops—Thompson—Cariboo in the federal parliament.

Born in Trail, British Columbia, Hinton has served as mayor of Logan Lake, British Columbia, and as an alderman and school trustee in Kamloops, British Columbia.

In the 2000 Canadian federal election, she was elected to the House of Commons of Canada as the Canadian Alliance candidate in the riding of Kamloops, Thompson and Highland Valleys. She was re-elected as the Conservative Party of Canada candidate in the riding of Kamloops—Thompson in the 2004 Canadian federal election. A businesswoman, she has served as the Assistant Deputy Chair of Committees of the Whole, as well as the Opposition Critic of Multiculturalism, the Status of Women, Public Health, and as Critic of Veterans Affairs. She was also the Vice-Chair of the Subcommittee on Veterans Affairs of the Standing Committee on National Defence and Veterans Affairs.

Re-elected in the 2006 Canadian federal election, she was appointed Parliamentary Secretary to the Minister of Veterans Affairs in the 39th Parliament. Hinton assisted the introduction of the Veterans' Bill of Rights. Hinton did not seek re-election in 2008; fellow Conservative Cathy McLeod succeeded her.

== Electoral history ==
2006 Canadian federal election: Kamloops—Thompson—Cariboo
Party	Candidate	Votes	%	±%	Expenditures
Conservative	Betty Hinton	20,948	39.27	-1.08	$50,696
New Democratic	Michael Crawford	16,417	30.78	+4.59	$34,590
Liberal	Ken Sommerfeld	13,454	25.22	-3.04	$41,547
Green	Matt Greenwood	2,518	4.72	+0.39	$855
Total valid votes		53,337	100.0		
Total rejected ballots		101	0.2		
Turnout		53,438	63		
Conservative hold		Swing		-2.84	

2004 Canadian federal election: Kamloops–Thompson
Party	Candidate	Votes	%	Expenditures
Conservative	Betty Hinton	20,611	40.35	$50,665
Liberal	John O'Fee	14,434	28.26	$78,065
New Democratic	Brian Carroll	13,379	26.19	$62,464
Green	Grant Fraser	2,213	4.33	$3,649
Independent	Arjun Singh	440	0.86	$289
Total valid votes		51,077	100.0	
Total rejected ballots		155	0.3	
Turnout		51,232	63.9	
This riding was created from Kamloops, Thompson and Highland Valleys and parts of Cariboo—Chilcotin and Prince George—Bulkley Valley, all of which elected a Canadian Alliance candidate in the last election. Betty Hinton was the incumbent from Kamloops, Thompson and Highland Valleys.
