= Parkland (electoral district) =

Federal electoral district in Alberta, Canada

Alberta electoral district
- Interactive map of riding boundaries from the 2025 federal election

Federal electoral district
- Legislature: House of Commons
MP
Dane Lloyd
Conservative
- District created: 2023
- First contested: 2025

Demographics
- Population (2021): 114,679
- Electors (2025): 92,583
- Area (km²): 10,108
- Pop. density (per km²): 11.3
- Census division(s): Division No. 11, Division No. 13, Division No. 14
- Census subdivision(s): Spruce Grove, Parkland, Stony Plain, Lac Ste. Anne (part), Yellowhead (part), Drayton Valley, Brazeau, Enoch, Mayerthorpe, Wabamun

Parkland is a federal electoral district in Alberta, Canada. It came into effect upon the call of the 2025 Canadian federal election.

== Geography ==
Created in the 2022 Canadian federal electoral redistribution, the riding is based in the western exurbs of Edmonton. It includes all of Parkland County including Spruce Grove, Stony Plain, Spring Lake; Brazeau County including Drayton Valley and Breton; the eastern part of Yellowhead County around Chip Lake and the part of Lac Ste. Anne County around Mayerthorpe.

== Demographics ==
According to the 2021 Canadian census

Languages: 92.4% English, 1.9% French, 1.0% Tagalog

Religions: 49.0% Christian (17.8% Catholic, 4.7% United Church, 4.1% Lutheran, 2.7% Anglican, 1.3% Baptist, 1.1% Pentecostal, 17.2% Other), 48.1% No religion

Median income: $46,000 (2020)

Average income: $59,500 (2020)

Panethnic groups in Parkland (2021)
Panethnic group	2021	
Panethnic group	Pop.	%
European (Note: Statistic includes all persons that did not make up part of a visible minority or an indigenous identity.)	94,820	83.78%
Indigenous	11,585	10.24%
Southeast Asian (Note: Statistic includes total responses of "Filipino" and "Southeast Asian" under visible minority section on census.)	2,625	2.32%
African	1,230	1.09%
South Asian	1,195	1.06%
East Asian (Note: Statistic includes total responses of "Chinese", "Korean", and "Japanese" under visible minority section on census.)	810	0.72%
Latin American	450	0.4%
Middle Eastern (Note: Statistic includes total responses of "West Asian" and "Arab" under visible minority section on census.)	180	0.16%
Other/multiracial (Note: Statistic includes total responses of "Visible minority, n.i.e." and "Multiple visible minorities" under visible minority section on census.)	280	0.25%
Total responses	113,175	98.68%
Total population	114,685	100%
Notes: Totals greater than 100% due to multiple origin responses. Demographics based on 2022 Canadian federal electoral redistribution riding boundaries.

== History ==
Parliament	Years	Member	Party
Parkland; Riding created from Sturgeon River—Parkland and Yellowhead
45th	2025–present	Dane Lloyd	Conservative

== Electoral results ==
2025 Canadian federal election
Party	Candidate	Votes	%	±%	Expenditures
Conservative	Dane Lloyd	53,468	75.19	+12.10	$89,894.86
Liberal	Ashley Fearnall	12,690	17.85	+11.61	$4,728.85
New Democratic	Keri Goad	2,949	4.15	–12.13	$831.88
People's	Jason Lavigne	1,066	1.50	–9.78	$11,267.27
Green	Daniel Birrell	449	0.63	–	none listed
United	Wade Klassen	287	0.40	–	$1,323.59
Christian Heritage	Kevin Schulthies	198	0.28	–0.20	$332.95
Total valid votes/expense limit		71,107	99.44	–	$144,325.84
Total rejected ballots		398	0.56	–	
Turnout		71,505	74.80	–	
Eligible voters		95,600			
Conservative notional hold		Swing		+0.25	
Source: Elections Canada

2021 federal election redistributed results
Party	Vote	%
Conservative	38,359	63.09
New Democratic	9,901	16.28
People's	6,858	11.28
Liberal	3,795	6.24
Others	1,888	3.11
