= Killing of Lyle and Marie McCann =

Double murder in Alberta

Lyle McCann
- Born: Lyle Thomas McCann; 24 August 1931; Alberta
- Died: 3 July 2010 (aged 78)
- Children: 3

Marie McCann
- Born: Marie Waltz; 15 October 1932; Alberta
- Died: 3 July 2010 (aged 77)
- Children: 3

Lyle and Marie McCann were last seen on July 3, 2010, while on a road trip from their hometown of St. Albert, Alberta, to Chilliwack, in the Canadian province of British Columbia. A few days later, their charred motorhome was discovered, resulting in a search that led to the arrest of Travis Vader. Vader was eventually charged with second-degree murder in the deaths of the McCanns, though their bodies have not been discovered. Vader was found guilty on September 15, 2016. On October 31, 2016, the second-degree murder conviction was reversed and Vader was convicted of manslaughter.

== Lyle and Marie McCann ==
Lyle Thomas McCann was born August 24, 1931, near Red Deer, Alberta, one of six children. He was a long-haul truck driver for many years, traveling throughout North America. Marie McCann (née Waltz) was born October 15, 1932, in Torrington, Alberta, one of seven children.

The two were married July 30, 1952, in Torrington, and had resided in St. Albert, Alberta, since 1964. They had three children. Lyle and Marie were 78 and 77 years old, respectively, at the time of their disappearance.

== Disappearance ==
On July 3, 2010, the McCanns left St. Albert for Chilliwack, BC, for a vacation and were to pick up their daughter on July 10 at the Abbotsford International Airport. That same day they were seen at a Superstore gas station fuelling their 1999 Gulfstream Coach motorhome in St. Albert, with their green Hyundai Tucson in tow. They are then believed to have traveled to the Yellowhead Highway.

In the evening of July 5, firefighters responded to a motorhome on fire at the Minnow Lake campground near Edson, Alberta. No bodies were found, but police discovered the motorhome belonged to the McCanns, though the Hyundai Tucson was missing. The Royal Canadian Mounted Police (RCMP) visited the McCanns' home, but received no answer.

When the McCanns did not arrive in at Abbotsford Airport on July 10, their daughter, Trudy Holder, notified the RCMP, who released a missing persons notification. The RCMP realized the connection between the burned-out motorhome and the McCanns' disappearance and launched aerial and ground searches. On July 16, the RCMP found the McCanns' SUV near Highway 16 and Range Road 144, about 30 kilometres east of Edson. They soon announced that the disappearance of the McCanns appeared to be foul play. At the same time, the RCMP revealed a person of interest, 38-year-old Travis Edward Vader of no fixed address. Vader had multiple outstanding warrants at the time and a criminal history, including vehicular theft in 1995; possession of break-in tools, driving a motor vehicle while unauthorized, operating an irregular motor vehicle and trailer, and weapons charges in August 2009; stealing and burning a truck in December 2009; and careless use of a firearm and unauthorized possession of a firearm in June 2010.

=== Arrest of Travis Vader and continued searches ===
On July 19, 2010, Vader was arrested near Niton Junction, Alberta, on outstanding warrants unrelated to the disappearance of the McCanns. On July 27, Vader's sister, Bobbi-Jo, revealed to the media that her brother stayed with her family in Edmonton on July 4, a day after the McCanns were last seen, and that he appeared "tired... sick and [that] he needed to rest."

Vader, while still being held in custody, was officially announced a suspect in the disappearance of the McCanns on August 31, 2010. On September 10, the RCMP announced they were searching a property south of Nojack, Alberta, as part of the investigation. On September 14, the RCMP revealed they had ended their search of the property, where they searched a pond, septic tank, and combed through piles of debris. The property belonged to an acquaintance of Vader, and a dive team was used to search the pond and septic tank.

Vader, still in custody, was denied bail on March 18, 2011; the RCMP believed he still had information about the McCanns or had some involvement with them, though he did not face any charges related to the investigation. A few months later, on June 27, 2011, the RCMP searched a property near Lodgepole, Alberta, southwest of Edmonton, in relation to the investigation.

=== Declaration of the couple's death and Vader's release ===
On July 27, 2011, a court issued an order declaring the McCanns to be deceased; the RCMP now believed the McCanns to have been killed the day they disappeared. Vader was denied bail again on February 15, 2012.

On April 23, 2012, Vader was officially charged with two counts of first-degree murder in the deaths of Lyle and Marie McCann, though the whereabouts of their bodies is still unknown. These charges were stayed by the Crown on 13 March 2014. On October 12, 2012, Vader was convicted of offences that included drug trafficking, theft, and weapons charges, though a new trial was ordered due to previously undisclosed evidence. On February 13, 2014, Vader launched a lawsuit against the RCMP, accusing them of keeping him in custody until he could be charged with the deaths of the McCanns.

On October 8, 2014, Vader was found not guilty of nine charges unrelated to the disappearance of the McCanns, and released from custody shortly afterwards. Upon his release, Vader told the media that the RCMP had "probably destroyed my life... [They] put me in jail for four years to investigate me when there was nothing there to begin with" and that he knew nothing about the McCanns and that his "heart goes out to them."

=== Vader re-arrested, murder trial ===
On December 19, 2014, Vader was arrested in St. Albert again in relation to the deaths of the McCanns. The whereabouts of the McCanns' bodies still remained unknown.

On September 15, 2016, Vader was found not guilty of first-degree murder. He was, however, found guilty of second-degree murder with an eligibility of parole within 10–25 years. The verdict attracted immediate criticism from legal experts, who claimed that it relied on a law that had been previously ruled unconstitutional. On October 31, 2016, Justice Denny Thomas reversed the original conviction and Vader was convicted of manslaughter due to an error in the original case.

On January 25, 2017, Vader was sentenced to a single term of life in prison, with the eligibility of parole in 7 years. On December 12, 2024, Vader was denied parole. His refusal to reveal the location of the McCann's remains was cited as one of the reasons for his parole denial.

== See also ==
- Crime in Canada
- List of murder convictions without a body
- Lists of solved missing person cases
