= Kamloops—Thompson—Nicola =

Federal electoral district in British Columbia, Canada

British Columbia electoral district
- Interactive map of riding boundaries from the 2025 federal election. Point indicates the city of Kamloops.

Federal electoral district
- Legislature: House of Commons
MP
Frank Caputo
Conservative
- District created: 2023
- First contested: 2025
- Last contested: 2025

Demographics
- Population (2021): 111,707
- Electors (2025): 88,539
- Area (km²): 49,560
- Pop. density (per km²): 2.3
- Census division(s): Squamish-Lillooet, Thompson-Nicola
- Census subdivision(s): Kamloops (part), Merritt, Kamloops, Clearwater, Lillooet, Logan Lake, Barriere, Ashcroft, Sun Peaks Mountain, Cache Creek

Kamloops—Thompson—Nicola is a federal electoral district in British Columbia, Canada. It came into effect upon the call of the 2025 Canadian federal election.

== Geography ==
Under the 2022 Canadian federal electoral redistribution the riding will replace Kamloops—Thompson—Cariboo.

- Gains Logan Lake, Merritt, the regional district electoral areas of Thompson-Nicola M (Beautiful Nicola Valley – North) and Thompson-Nicola N (Beautiful Nicola Valley – South), and the Indian Reserves of Coldwater 1, Douglas Lake 3, Joeyaska 2, Nicola Lake 1, Nicola Mameet 1, Nooaitch 10, Paul's Basin 2 and Zoht 4 from Central Okanagan—Similkameen—Nicola.
- Gains the regional district electoral areas of Squamish-Lillooet A, Squamish-Lillooet B, Thompson-Nicola I (Blue Sky Country) and all enclosed municipalities and Indian Reserves from Mission—Matsqui—Fraser Canyon.
- Loses the southeastern third of Kamloops and the remainder of Thompson-Nicola L (Grasslands) to Kamloops—Shuswap—Central Rockies.

== Demographics ==
According to the 2021 Canadian census

Languages: 90.5% English, 1.6% Punjabi, 1.3% French

Religions: 60.7% No religion, 33.2% Christian (10.7% Catholic, 3.7% United Church, 3.5% Anglican, 1.3% Lutheran, 1.1% Baptist, 12.9% Other), 1.9% Sikh

Median income: $39,200 (2020)

Average income: $49,920 (2020)

Panethnic groups in Kamloops—Thompson—Nicola (2021)
| Panethnic group | 2021 | |
| Panethnic group | Pop. | % |
|---|---|---|
| European (Note: Statistic includes all persons that did not make up part of a visible minority or an indigenous identity.) | 80,600 | 74.95% |
| Indigenous | 17,525 | 16.3% |
| South Asian | 4,115 | 3.83% |
| East Asian (Note: Statistic includes total responses of "Chinese", "Korean", and "Japanese" under visible minority section on census.) | 2,120 | 1.97% |
| Southeast Asian (Note: Statistic includes total responses of "Filipino" and "Southeast Asian" under visible minority section on census.) | 1,325 | 1.23% |
| African | 905 | 0.84% |
| Latin American | 390 | 0.36% |
| Middle Eastern (Note: Statistic includes total responses of "West Asian" and "Arab" under visible minority section on census.) | 255 | 0.24% |
| Other/multiracial (Note: Statistic includes total responses of "Visible minority, n.i.e." and "Multiple visible minorities" under visible minority section on census.) | 310 | 0.29% |
| Total responses | 107,540 | 96.28% |
| Total population | 111,690 | 100% |
Notes: Totals greater than 100% due to multiple origin responses. Demographics based on 2022 Canadian federal electoral redistribution riding boundaries.

== History ==
| Parliament | Years | Member | Party |
|---|---|---|---|
Kamloops—Thompson—Nicola; Riding created from Central Okanagan—Similkameen—Nicola, Kamloops—Thompson—Cariboo, Mission—Matsqui—Fraser Canyon, and North Okanagan—Shuswap
| 45th | 2025–present | Frank Caputo | Conservative |

== Electoral results ==
2025 Canadian federal election
** Preliminary results — Not yet official **
| Party | Candidate | Votes | % | ±% | Expenditures |
|---|---|---|---|---|---|
| Conservative | Frank Caputo | 32,007 | 51.54 | +8.04 | |
| Liberal | Iain Currie | 24,956 | 40.19 | +22.49 | |
| New Democratic | Miguel Godau | 3,684 | 5.93 | –22.63 | |
| Green | Jenna Lindley | 933 | 1.50 | –2.26 | |
| People's | Chris Enns | 516 | 0.83 | –5.14 | |
| Total valid votes/expense limit | | | | | |
| Total rejected ballots | | | | | |
| Turnout | | 62,096 | 69.58 | | |
| Eligible voters | | 89,245 | | | |
| Conservative notional hold | | Swing | | –7.23 | |
Source: Elections Canada

2021 federal election redistributed results
| Party | Vote | % |
|---|---|---|
| Conservative | 24,448 | 43.50 |
| New Democratic | 16,049 | 28.56 |
| Liberal | 9,945 | 17.70 |
| People's | 3,354 | 5.97 |
| Green | 2,113 | 3.76 |
| Others | 292 | 0.52 |
