= Whistler sled dog cull =

2010 cull of sled dogs in Canada

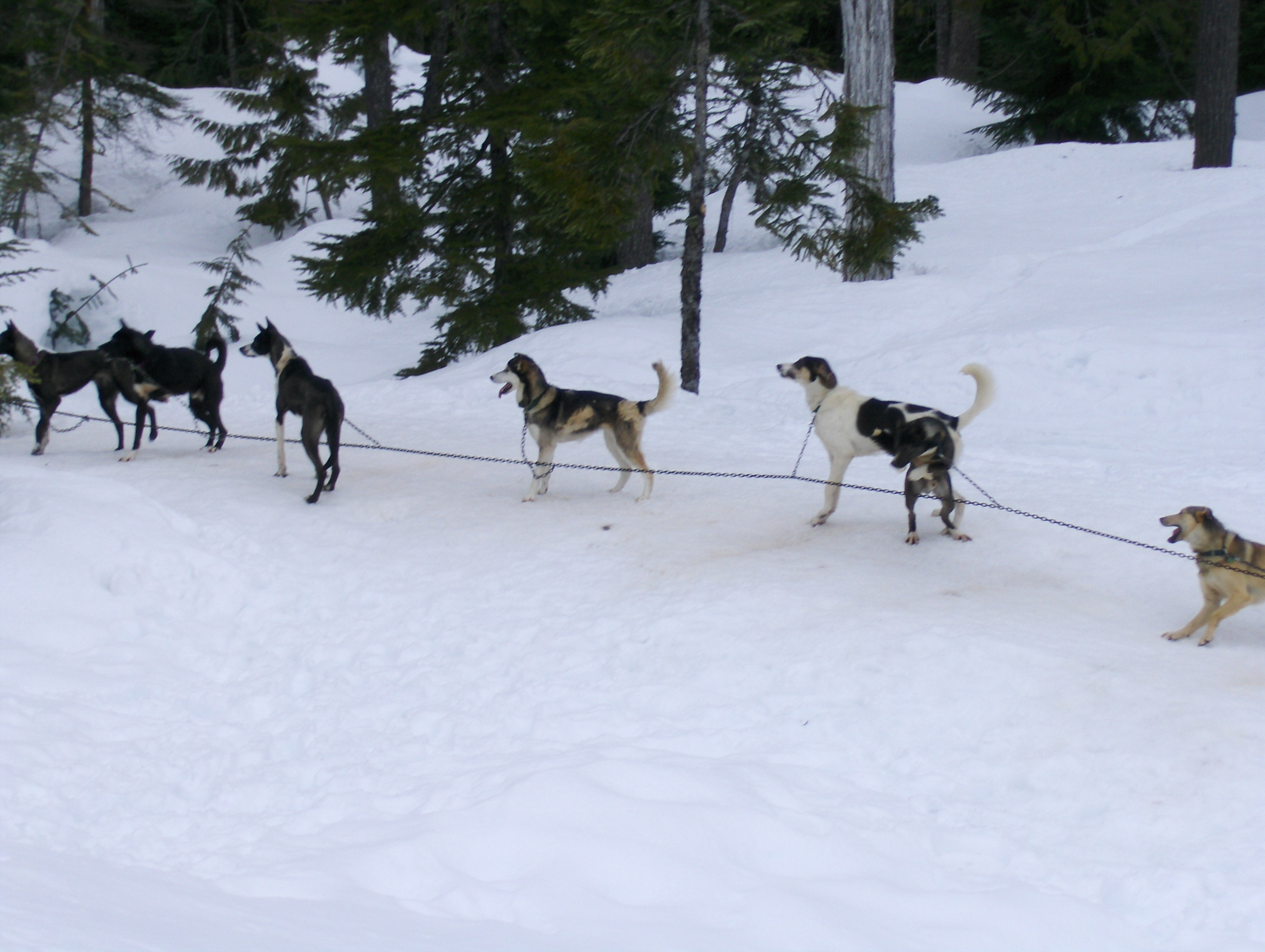
Sled dogs in Whistler, British Columbia

The Whistler sled dog cull was a controversial cull of over 100 sled dogs in Whistler, British Columbia, Canada, that prompted investigation by the British Columbia Society for the Prevention of Cruelty to Animals (SPCA) and Royal Canadian Mounted Police (RCMP). It occurred on April 21 and April 23, 2010, performed by Robert Fawcett, who later filed a claim at WorkSafeBC for post-traumatic stress disorder. Fawcett, an employee of Howling Dog Tours Whistler Inc., was allegedly told to euthanize the dogs because of a downturn in business after the 2010 Olympic Games.

== History ==
The incident took place at Howling Dog Tours Whistler Inc. (under operational control by Outdoor Adventures Whistler), a company that provided sled dog tours to tourists, and had had orders filed against it by the SPCA in 2006. Robert Fawcett, an employee of Howling Dog Tours Whistler Inc., filed a workers' compensation claim with WorkSafeBC for post-traumatic stress disorder after being told to kill 56 sled dogs in April 2010 because of a downturn in bookings following the 2010 Olympic Games, after a veterinarian refused to euthanize the healthy dogs. Fawcett alleged "execution-style killings" in which he wrestled dogs to the ground, stood on them, and shot them or slit their throats. The dogs were then dumped into mass graves. A statement from Outdoor Adventures Whistler, the parent company, stated that "OAW was aware of the relocation and euthanization of dogs at Howling Dogs in April 2010 but it was our expectation that it was done in a proper, legal and humane manner."

An investigation was launched by the B.C. SPCA, hiring a team of forensic experts. It was estimated to cost up to $225,000, half of which would be provided by the B.C. government. It was the most complex investigation the SPCA has ever undertaken by Marcie Moriarty, General Manager of cruelty investigations for the B.C. SPCA. The excavation was completed on May 9, 2011, and recovered the bodies of 56 dogs.

== Response ==
=== Media and public response ===
Various Outdoor Adventures employees received anonymous death threats and rallies were scheduled across B.C. to protest the killings.

Despite the controversy, Tourism Whistler reported normal amounts of website bookings.

The amount of money spent on the investigation was criticized in an editorial by the Times Colonist:

But can this costly investigation really be justified? We already know much about what happened and the person who did the killing is not denying it. What else could be done with the $225,000? We could put the money toward a search for the women who have gone missing along Highway 16 in the central Interior—or use it to boost rewards for information.

Marcie Moriarty defended the cost by saying, "I want to be clear: We would not have taken this step if it wasn't essential to proceeding with possible charges in this particular case. Our legal system requires proof of allegations, and in this case the forensic evidence was a key component".

According to Kaley Pugh, Manager of Animal Protective Services for the Saskatchewan SPCA, adoptions of huskies have increased due to the incident.

=== Government response ===
A "Sled Dog Task Force" was set up by former B.C. Premier Gordon Campbell, which made 10 recommendations, all of which were accepted by the province under his successor, Premier Christy Clark. Among proposed amendments to animal cruelty laws were raising the statute of limitations for animal cruelty from six months to three years and increasing maximum penalties from $10,000 and six months in jail to $75,000 and two years in jail, making B.C. animal rights legislation the toughest in Canada. Clark also announced the appointment of a Crown lawyer to deal with animal cruelty cases. The legislation was introduced on May 11, 2011.

The province proclaimed April 23, 2011 (one of the two days on which the crime was committed a year prior) Animal Abuse Prevention Day.

The provincial government stated in October 2011 that sled dog companies must have their animals inspected annually if they want to operate on British Columbia Crown land.

The BCSPCA did not do a physical hands on re-check of the 'orders' issued to the owner of the dogs, on previous investigations. If BCSPCA Eileen Drever had allowed her departments special constables to attend the earlier calls in person, they would have seen that the 'orders' issued for compliance had not been completed and the dogs might have been seized under warrant and saved. She told her staff that she, Drever, would take care of the re-checks and compliance with these previous 'orders'.

== Judgement for Fawcett ==
Robert Fawcett was sentenced to three years’ probation on November 22, 2012 for causing unnecessary pain and suffering to nine of the animals. Judge Steve Merrick concluded Fawcett had the best interests of the dogs at heart when he culled the pack near Whistler.

The decision was not well received by the British Columbia SPCA and public at large. People in the court gallery openly sobbed, and at one point there was an outburst that was met with a sharp reprimand from the judge. The defense supplied 30 character references to the judge that described Fawcett’s “admirable dedication” to the dogs. SPCA investigators slammed B.C.’s justice system saying Fawcett “walked away” from his crimes with a light sentence.
