= Canadian federal election results in the British Columbia Interior =

Seats obtained by party

Conservative
Liberal
New Democratic
Alliance (defunct)
Reform (defunct)
Progressive Conservative (defunct)
Social Credit (defunct)
CCF (defunct)
Reconstruction (1935, defunct)
Independents

This is page shows results of Canadian federal elections in the interior of British Columbia.

== Regional profile ==
The BC Interior is a fairly conservative area today, although it has not always been that way. From the early days of the party to the early 1990s, this region was a New Democratic Party stronghold until its support throughout the entire province collapsed in 1993. From 1993 to 2000, the Reform and Canadian Alliance parties took over in a dramatic shift (widely seen as a protest vote against established parties), winning handily in nearly every riding. The Conservatives continued to hold most of the seats in 2004 (with one exception in the northwestern corner of the province). While the NDP managed to take another seat in 2006 due to more prog, staunch divisions on social issues outside of more progressive areas in the Kootenays such as Nelson made it difficult for the NDP to make further gains. Some of the strongest conservative support is in Kelowna and the Okanagan, where a large number of retirees reside, although the bulk of inland Liberal support is also in Kelowna itself. For decades, the only close races in this region have been between the Conservatives and NDP. In the 2015 election, regional NDP strength allowed them to pick up a third seat, and in one of the biggest surprises of the election, the Liberals picked up their first seat in the BC Interior since 1974 in the region's most urban riding, Kelowna—Lake Country.

=== Votes by party throughout time ===
Election	Liberal	Conservative	New Democratic	Green	People's	PC	Reform / Alliance	Social Credit	Others
1979	77,183; 24.7%	—N/a	91,737; 29.3%	—N/a	—N/a	140,278; 44.8%	—N/a	1,363; 0.4%	2,378; 0.8%
1980	73,453; 23.2%	—N/a	112,062; 35.4%	—N/a	—N/a	129,054; 40.8%	—N/a	1,213; 0.4%	851; 0.3%
1984	48,153; 12.5%	—N/a	140,989; 36.6%	1,025; 0.3%	—N/a	189,221; 49.1%	—N/a	2,104; 0.5%	4,008; 1.0%
1988	64,356; 16.7%	—N/a	158,044; 41.0%	2,614; 0.7%	—N/a	136,017; 35.3%	19,783; 5.1%	451; 0.1%	3,956; 1.0%
1993	97,349; 23.5%	—N/a	72,517; 17.5%	3,139; 0.8%	—N/a	52,255; 12.6%	172,065; 41.5%	—N/a	17,513; 4.2%
1997	88,481; 22.5%	—N/a	66,451; 16.9%	7,941; 2.0%	—N/a	28,232; 7.2%	198,222; 50.4%	—N/a	4,332; 1.1%
2000	86,652; 21.0%	—N/a	45,530; 11.0%	7,182; 1.7%	—N/a	26,610; 6.5%	237,012; 57.5%	—N/a	9,538; 2.3%
2004	88,402; 21.7%	186,110; 45.7%	102,792; 25.2%	22,662; 5.6%	—N/a	—N/a	—N/a	—N/a	7,411; 1.8%
2006	88,235; 20.9%	184,643; 43.7%	118,470; 28.1%	26,719; 6.3%	—N/a	—N/a	—N/a	—N/a	4,008; 0.9%
2008	40,656; 9.8%	211,930; 51.3%	112,680; 27.3%	44,611; 10.8%	—N/a	—N/a	—N/a	—N/a	2,958; 0.7%
2011	29,000; 6.6%	227,901; 52.2%	143,960; 33.0%	31,065; 7.1%	—N/a	—N/a	—N/a	—N/a	4,523; 1.0%
2015	163,975; 30.1%	203,083; 37.2%	153,149; 28.1%	21,577; 4.0%	—N/a	—N/a	—N/a	—N/a	3,565; 0.7%
2019	115,350; 20.3%	266,459; 47.0%	118,985; 21.0%	50,417; 8.9%	12,639; 2.2%	—N/a	—N/a	—N/a	3,616; 0.6%
2021	86,978; 16.0%	245,776; 45.2%	144,849; 26.7%	20,345; 3.7%	42,237; 7.8%	—N/a	—N/a	—N/a	3,058; 0.6%
2025	217,263; 35.0%	324,407; 52.2%	63,976; 10.3%	9,941; 1.6%	3,705; 0.6%	—N/a	—N/a	—N/a	1,938; 0.3%

Liberal Conservative New Democratic Green People's	Progressive Conservative (defunct) Alliance (defunct) Reform (defunct)

== 2021 ==
Electoral district	Candidates						Incumbent
Electoral district	Liberal	Conservative	NDP	Green	PPC	Other	Incumbent
Cariboo—Prince George	Garth Frizzell; 8,397; 16.56%	Todd Doherty; 25,771; 50.82%	Audrey McKinnon; 10,323; 20.36%	Leigh Hunsinger-Chang; 1,844; 3.64%	Jeremy Gustafson; 4,160; 8.20%	Henry Thiessen (CHP); 218; 0.43%	Todd Doherty
Central Okanagan—Similkameen—Nicola	Sarah Eves; 13,291; 20.70%	Dan Albas; 30,563; 47.60%	Joan Phillip; 13,813; 21.51%	Brennan Wauters; 1,755; 2.73%	Kathryn Mcdonald; 4,788; 7.46%		Dan Albas
Kamloops—Thompson—Cariboo	Jesse McCormick; 12,717; 18.05%	Frank Caputo; 30,281; 42.98%	Bill Sundhu; 20,431; 29.00%	Iain Currie; 2,576; 3.66%	Corally Delwo; 4,033; 5.72%	Wayne Allan (Ind.); 146 0.21%	Cathy McLeod†
Kamloops—Thompson—Cariboo	Jesse McCormick; 12,717; 18.05%	Frank Caputo; 30,281; 42.98%	Bill Sundhu; 20,431; 29.00%	Iain Currie; 2,576; 3.66%	Corally Delwo; 4,033; 5.72%	Bob O'Brien (Ind.); 264 0.37%	Cathy McLeod†
Kelowna—Lake Country	Tim Krupa; 17,767; 26.46%	Tracy Gray; 30,409; 45.29%	Cade Desjarlais; 12,204; 18.18%	Imre Szeman; 2,074; 3.09%	Brian Rogers; 4,688; 6.98%		Tracy Gray
Kootenay—Columbia	Robin Goldsbury; 5,879; 9.05%	Rob Morrison; 28,056; 43.19%	Wayne Stetski; 23,986; 36.92%	Rana Nelson; 2,577; 3.97%	Sarah Bennett; 4,467; 6.88%		Rob Morrison
North Okanagan—Shuswap	Shelley Desautels; 13,666; 18.88%	Mel Arnold; 33,626; 46.45%	Ron Johnston; 13,929; 19.24%	Andrea Gunner; 3,967; 5.48%	Kyle Delfing; 7,209; 9.96%		Mel Arnold
Prince George—Peace River—Northern Rockies	Amir Alavi; 4,236; 8.61%	Bob Zimmer; 29,882; 60.74%	Cory Grizz Longley; 6,647; 13.51%	Catharine Kendall; 1,661; 3.38%	Ryan Dyck; 5,138; 10.44%	Phil Hewkin (CFF); 53 0.11%	Bob Zimmer
Prince George—Peace River—Northern Rockies	Amir Alavi; 4,236; 8.61%	Bob Zimmer; 29,882; 60.74%	Cory Grizz Longley; 6,647; 13.51%	Catharine Kendall; 1,661; 3.38%	Ryan Dyck; 5,138; 10.44%	David Jeffers (Mav.); 1,580 3.21%	Bob Zimmer
Skeena—Bulkley Valley	Lakhwinder Jhaj; 2,866; 7.66%	Claire Rattée; 13,513; 36.14%	Taylor Bachrach; 15,921; 42.58%	Adeana Young; 1,406; 3.76%	Jody Craven; 2,888; 7.72%	Rod Taylor (CHP); 797; 2.13%	Taylor Bachrach
South Okanagan—West Kootenay	Ken Robertson; 8,159; 12.22%	Helena Konanz; 23,675; 35.45%	Richard Cannings; 27,595; 41.32%	Tara Howse; 2,485; 3.72%	Sean Taylor; 4,866; 7.29%		Richard Cannings

== 2019 ==
Electoral district	Candidates						Incumbent
Electoral district	Liberal	Conservative	NDP	Green	PPC	Other	Incumbent
Cariboo—Prince George	Tracy Calogheros; 10,932; 19.96%	Todd Doherty; 28,848; 52.67%	Heather Sapergia; 8,440; 15.41%	Mackenzie Kerr; 4,998; 9.12%	Jing Lan Yang; 1,206; 2.20%	Michael Orr (Ind.); 350; 0.64%	Todd Doherty
Central Okanagan—Similkameen—Nicola	Mary Ann Murphy; 16,252; 25.03%	Dan Albas; 31,135; 47.95%	Joan Phillip; 10,904; 16.79%	Robert Mellalieu; 5,086; 7.83%	Allan Duncan; 1,345; 2.07%	Jesse Regier (Libert.); 213; 0.33%	Dan Albas
Kamloops—Thompson—Cariboo	Terry Lake; 19,716; 27.21%	Cathy McLeod; 32,415; 44.74%	Cynthia Egli; 9,936; 13.71%	Iain Currie; 8,789; 12.13%	Ken Finlayson; 1,132; 1.56%	Kira Cheeseborough (Animal); 321 0.44%	Cathy McLeod
Kamloops—Thompson—Cariboo	Terry Lake; 19,716; 27.21%	Cathy McLeod; 32,415; 44.74%	Cynthia Egli; 9,936; 13.71%	Iain Currie; 8,789; 12.13%	Ken Finlayson; 1,132; 1.56%	Peter Kerek (Comm.); 144 0.20%	Cathy McLeod
Kelowna—Lake Country	Stephen Fuhr; 22,627; 32.74%	Tracy Gray; 31,497; 45.57%	Justin Kulik; 8,381; 12.13%	Travis Ashley; 5,171; 7.48%	John Barr; 1,225; 1.77%	Daniel Joseph (Ind.); 152 0.22%	Stephen Fuhr
Kelowna—Lake Country	Stephen Fuhr; 22,627; 32.74%	Tracy Gray; 31,497; 45.57%	Justin Kulik; 8,381; 12.13%	Travis Ashley; 5,171; 7.48%	John Barr; 1,225; 1.77%	Silverado Socrates (Ind.); 67 0.10%	Stephen Fuhr
Kootenay—Columbia	Robin Goldsbury; 6,151; 9.14%	Rob Morrison; 30,168; 44.81%	Wayne Stetski; 23,149; 34.38%	Abra Brynne; 6,145; 9.13%	Rick Stewart; 1,378; 2.05%	Trev Miller (Animal); 339; 0.50%	Wayne Stetski
North Okanagan—Shuswap	Cindy Derkaz; 16,783; 22.64%	Mel Arnold; 36,154; 48.76%	Harwinder Sandhu; 11,353; 15.31%	Marc Reinarz; 7,828; 10.56%	Kyle Delfing; 2,027; 2.73%		Mel Arnold
Prince George—Peace River—Northern Rockies	Mavis Erickson; 6,391; 11.59%	Bob Zimmer; 38,473; 69.79%	Marcia Luccock; 5,069; 9.19%	Catharine Kendall; 3,448; 6.25%	Ron Vaillant; 1,748; 3.17%		Bob Zimmer
Skeena—Bulkley Valley	Dave Birdi; 4,793; 11.58%	Claire Rattée; 13,756; 33.24%	Taylor Bachrach; 16,944; 40.94%	Mike Sawyer; 3,280; 7.93%	Jody Craven; 940; 2.27%	Danny Nunes (Ind.); 164 0.40%	Nathan Cullen†
Skeena—Bulkley Valley	Dave Birdi; 4,793; 11.58%	Claire Rattée; 13,756; 33.24%	Taylor Bachrach; 16,944; 40.94%	Mike Sawyer; 3,280; 7.93%	Jody Craven; 940; 2.27%	Merv Ritchie (Ind.); 157 0.38%	Nathan Cullen†
Skeena—Bulkley Valley	Dave Birdi; 4,793; 11.58%	Claire Rattée; 13,756; 33.24%	Taylor Bachrach; 16,944; 40.94%	Mike Sawyer; 3,280; 7.93%	Jody Craven; 940; 2.27%	Rod Taylor (CHP); 1,350 3.26%	Nathan Cullen†
South Okanagan—West Kootenay	Connie Denesiuk; 11,705; 17.16%	Helena Konanz; 24,013; 35.21%	Richard Cannings; 24,809; 36.38%	Tara Howse; 5,672; 8.32%	Sean Taylor; 1,638; 2.40%	Carolina Hopkins (Ind.); 359; 0.53%	Richard Cannings

== 2015 ==
Electoral district	Candidates					Incumbent
Electoral district	Conservative	NDP	Liberal	Green	Other	Incumbent
Cariboo—Prince George	Todd Doherty; 19,688; 36.64%	Trent Derrick; 13,879; 25.83%	Tracy Calogheros; 16,921; 31.49%	Richard Edward Jaques; 1,860; 3.46%	Gordon Campbell (NA) (Note: Gordon Campbell ran to provide a "none of the above" option for voters.); 402 0.75%	Dick Harris†
Cariboo—Prince George	Todd Doherty; 19,688; 36.64%	Trent Derrick; 13,879; 25.83%	Tracy Calogheros; 16,921; 31.49%	Richard Edward Jaques; 1,860; 3.46%	Sheldon Clare (Ind.); 657 1.22%	Dick Harris†
Cariboo—Prince George	Todd Doherty; 19,688; 36.64%	Trent Derrick; 13,879; 25.83%	Tracy Calogheros; 16,921; 31.49%	Richard Edward Jaques; 1,860; 3.46%	Adam De Kroon (CHP); 327 0.61%	Dick Harris†
Central Okanagan— Similkameen—Nicola	Dan Albas; 24,517; 39.56%	Angelique Wood; 11,961; 19.30%	Karley Scott; 23,059; 37.21%	Robert Mellalieu; 2,436; 3.93%		Dan Albas; Okanagan—Coquihalla
Kamloops—Thompson— Cariboo	Cathy McLeod; 24,595; 35.25%	Bill Sundhu; 21,466; 30.77%	Steve Powrie; 21,215; 30.41%	Matthew Greenwood; 2,489; 3.57%		Cathy McLeod
Kelowna—Lake Country	Ron Cannan; 25,502; 39.75%	Norah Mary Bowman; 9,039; 14.09%	Stephen Fuhr; 29,614; 46.16%	(Note: Gary Adams was selected as the Green Party candidate for Kelowna—Lake Country when he pledged to immediately resign and support the Liberal candidate, Stephen Fuhr. The party's federal leadership asked him not to resign or endorse Fuhr and Adams relented. Adams eventually registered as a candidate but soon withdrew and the party decided to respect local party members' decision to not run a candidate.)		Ron Cannan
Kootenay—Columbia	David Wilks; 23,247; 36.78%	Wayne Stetski; 23,529; 37.23%	Don Johnston; 12,315; 19.48%	Bill Green; 4,115; 6.51%		David Wilks
North Okanagan—Shuswap	Mel Arnold; 27,490; 39.30%	Jacqui Gingras; 17,907; 25.60%	Cindy Derkaz; 20,949; 29.95%	Chris George; 3,608; 5.16%		Colin Mayes†; Okanagan—Shuswap
Prince George— Peace River—Northern Rockies	Bob Zimmer; 27,237; 52.52%	Kathi Dickie; 8,014; 15.45%	Matt Shaw; 12,913; 24.90%	Elizabeth Biggar; 2,672; 5.15%	Barry Blackman (PC); 464 0.89%	Bob Zimmer; Prince George—Peace River
Prince George— Peace River—Northern Rockies	Bob Zimmer; 27,237; 52.52%	Kathi Dickie; 8,014; 15.45%	Matt Shaw; 12,913; 24.90%	Elizabeth Biggar; 2,672; 5.15%	W. Todd Keller (Libert.); 559 1.08%	Bob Zimmer; Prince George—Peace River
Skeena—Bulkley Valley	Tyler Nesbitt; 10,936; 24.79%	Nathan Cullen; 22,531; 51.08%	Brad Layton; 8,257; 18.72%	Jeannie Parnell; 1,605; 3.64%	Don Spratt (CHP); 780; 1.77%	Nathan Cullen
South Okanagan—West Kootenay	Marshall Neufeld; 19,871; 29.84%	Richard Cannings; 24,823; 37.28%	Connie Denesiuk; 18,732; 28.13%	Samantha Troy; 2,792; 4.19%	Brian Gray (Ind.); 376; 0.56%	Alex Atamanenko†; British Columbia Southern Interior

== 2011 ==
Electoral district	Candidates					Incumbent
Electoral district	Conservative	Liberal	NDP	Green	Other	Incumbent
British Columbia Southern Interior	Stephen Hill; 19,273; 38.93%	Shan Lavell; 1,872; 3.78%	Alex Atamanenko; 25,206; 50.92%	Bryan Hunt; 3,153; 6.37%		Alex Atamanenko
Cariboo—Prince George	Dick Harris; 24,443; 56.17%	Sangeeta Lalli; 2,200; 5.06%	Jon Van Barneveld; 13,135; 30.18%	Heidi Redl; 2,702; 6.21%	Jon Ronan (Ind.); 394 0.91%	Dick Harris
Cariboo—Prince George	Dick Harris; 24,443; 56.17%	Sangeeta Lalli; 2,200; 5.06%	Jon Van Barneveld; 13,135; 30.18%	Heidi Redl; 2,702; 6.21%	Henry Thiessen (CHP); 440 1.01%	Dick Harris
Cariboo—Prince George	Dick Harris; 24,443; 56.17%	Sangeeta Lalli; 2,200; 5.06%	Jon Van Barneveld; 13,135; 30.18%	Heidi Redl; 2,702; 6.21%	Jordan Turner (Rhino); 204 0.47%	Dick Harris
Kamloops—Thompson— Cariboo	Cathy McLeod; 29,682; 52.24%	Murray Todd; 3,026; 5.33%	Michael David Crawford; 20,983; 36.93%	Donovan Michael Cavers; 2,932; 5.16%	Christopher Kempling (CHP); 191; 0.34%	Cathy McLeod
Kelowna—Lake Country	Ron Cannan; 34,566; 57.40%	Kris Stewart; 7,069; 11.74%	Tisha Kalmanovitch; 13,322; 22.12%	Alice Hooper; 5,265; 8.74%		Ron Cannan
Kootenay—Columbia	David Wilks; 23,910; 55.88%	Betty Aitchison; 1,496; 3.50%	Mark Shmigelsky; 14,199; 33.18%	Bill Green; 2,547; 5.95%	Brent Bush (Ind.); 636; 1.49%	Jim Abbott†
Okanagan—Coquihalla	Dan Albas; 28,525; 53.58%	John Kidder; 5,815; 10.92%	David Finnis; 12,853; 24.14%	Dan Bouchard; 5,005; 9.40%	Sean Upshaw (Ind.); 860 1.62%	Stockwell Day†
Okanagan—Coquihalla	Dan Albas; 28,525; 53.58%	John Kidder; 5,815; 10.92%	David Finnis; 12,853; 24.14%	Dan Bouchard; 5,005; 9.40%	Dietrich Wittel (Ind.); 180 0.34%	Stockwell Day†
Okanagan—Shuswap	Colin Mayes; 31,439; 55.45%	Janna Francis; 4,246; 7.49%	Nikki Inouye; 14,955; 26.38%	Greig Crockett; 6,058; 10.68%		Colin Mayes
Prince George— Peace River	Bob Zimmer; 23,946; 62.12%	Ben Levine; 2,008; 5.21%	Lois Boone; 9,876; 25.62%	Hilary Crowley; 2,301; 5.97%	Jeremy Coté (Pirate); 415; 1.08%	Vacant
Skeena—Bulkley Valley	Clay Harmon; 12,117; 34.50%	Kyle Warwick; 1,268; 3.61%	Nathan Paul Cullen; 19,431; 55.33%	Roger Benham; 1,102; 3.14%	Maggie Braun (CAP); 165 0.47%	Nathan Cullen
Skeena—Bulkley Valley	Clay Harmon; 12,117; 34.50%	Kyle Warwick; 1,268; 3.61%	Nathan Paul Cullen; 19,431; 55.33%	Roger Benham; 1,102; 3.14%	Rod Taylor (CHP); 1,038 2.96%	Nathan Cullen

== 2008 ==
Electoral district	Candidates					Incumbent
Electoral district	Conservative	Liberal	NDP	Green	Other	Incumbent
British Columbia Southern Interior	Rob Zandee; 17,122; 35.85%	Brenda Jagpal; 3,292; 6.89%	Alex Atamanenko; 22,693; 47.51%	Andy Morel; 4,573; 9.57%	Brian Sproule (M-L); 80; 0.17%	Alex Atamanenko
Cariboo— Prince George	Dick Harris; 22,637; 55.39%	Drew Adamick; 4,309; 10.54%	Bev Collins; 10,581; 25.89%	Amber Van Drielen; 2,614; 6.40%	Douglas Gook (Ind.); 729; 1.78%	Dick Harris
Kamloops— Thompson— Cariboo	Cathy McLeod; 25,209; 46.16%	Ken Sommerfeld; 5,375; 9.84%	Michael Crawford; 19,601; 35.89%	Donovan Grube Cavers; 4,430; 8.11%		Betty Hinton†
Kelowna— Lake Country	Ron Cannan; 31,907; 55.94%	Diana Cabott; 8,469; 14.85%	Tish Lakes; 8,624; 15.12%	Angela Reid; 7,821; 13.71%	Mark Haley (Comm.); 218; 0.38%	Ron Cannan
Kootenay—Columbia	Jim Abbott; 23,402; 59.59%	Betty Aitchison; 3,044; 7.75%	Leon R. Pendleton; 8,892; 22.64%	Ralph Moore; 3,933; 10.02%		Jim Abbott
Okanagan—Coquihalla	Stockwell Day; 28,765; 58.13%	Valerie Hallford; 5,883; 11.89%	Ralph Poynting; 8,236; 16.64%	Dan Bouchard; 6,603; 13.34%		Stockwell Day
Okanagan—Shuswap	Colin Mayes; 28,002; 51.72%	Janna Francis; 5,414; 10.00%	Alice Brown; 10,664; 19.70%	Huguette Allen; 9,368; 17.30%	Gordie Campbell (NA); 416 0.77%	Colin Mayes
Okanagan—Shuswap	Colin Mayes; 28,002; 51.72%	Janna Francis; 5,414; 10.00%	Alice Brown; 10,664; 19.70%	Huguette Allen; 9,368; 17.30%	Darren Seymour (CAP); 278 0.51%	Colin Mayes
Prince George— Peace River	Jay Hill; 22,325; 63.59%	Lindsay Gidney; 2,954; 8.41%	Betty Bekkering; 6,170; 17.58%	Hilary Crowley; 3,656; 10.41%		Jay Hill
Skeena— Bulkley Valley	Sharon Smith; 12,561; 36.36%	Corinna Morhart; 1,916; 5.55%	Nathan Cullen; 17,219; 49.84%	Hondo Arendt; 1,613; 4.67%	Mary-Etta Goodacre (CAP); 112 0.32%	Nathan Cullen
Skeena— Bulkley Valley	Sharon Smith; 12,561; 36.36%	Corinna Morhart; 1,916; 5.55%	Nathan Cullen; 17,219; 49.84%	Hondo Arendt; 1,613; 4.67%	Rod Taylor (CHP); 1,125 3.26%	Nathan Cullen

== 2006 ==
Electoral district	Candidates					Incumbent
Electoral district	Liberal	Conservative	NDP	Green	Other	Incumbent
British Columbia Southern Interior	Bill Profili; 9,383; 20.20%	Derek Zeisman; 8,948; 19.26%	Alex Atamanenko; 22,742; 48.96%	Scott Leyland; 5,258; 11.32%	Brian Sproule (M-L); 123; 0.26%	Jim Gouk†
Cariboo—Prince George	Simon Yu; 10,509; 24.07%	Dick Harris; 19,624; 44.94%	Alfred Julian Trudeau; 10,129; 23.20%	Alex Bracewell; 2,416; 5.53%	Carol Lee Chapman (M-L); 109 0.25%	Dick Harris
Cariboo—Prince George	Simon Yu; 10,509; 24.07%	Dick Harris; 19,624; 44.94%	Alfred Julian Trudeau; 10,129; 23.20%	Alex Bracewell; 2,416; 5.53%	Bev Collins (CAP); 279 0.64%	Dick Harris
Cariboo—Prince George	Simon Yu; 10,509; 24.07%	Dick Harris; 19,624; 44.94%	Alfred Julian Trudeau; 10,129; 23.20%	Alex Bracewell; 2,416; 5.53%	Christopher S. M. Kempling (CHP); 505 1.16%	Dick Harris
Cariboo—Prince George	Simon Yu; 10,509; 24.07%	Dick Harris; 19,624; 44.94%	Alfred Julian Trudeau; 10,129; 23.20%	Alex Bracewell; 2,416; 5.53%	Don Roberts (FPNP); 95 0.22%	Dick Harris
Kamloops— Thompson—Cariboo	Ken Sommerfeld; 13,454; 25.22%	Betty Zane Hinton; 20,948; 39.27%	Michael Crawford; 16,417; 30.78%	Matt G. Greenwood; 2,518; 4.72%		Betty Hinton
Kelowna—Lake Country	Vern Nielsen; 14,807; 25.84%	Ron Cannan; 28,174; 49.17%	Kevin M. Hagglund; 9,538; 16.64%	Angela Reid; 4,562; 7.96%	David Thomson (CAP); 223; 0.39%	Werner Schmidt†
Kootenay—Columbia	Jhim Burwell; 5,443; 13.34%	Jim Abbott; 22,181; 54.36%	Brent Bush; 10,560; 25.88%	Clements Verhoeven; 2,490; 6.10%	Thomas Fredrick Sima (CAP); 132; 0.32%	Jim Abbott
Okanagan—Coquihalla	David Perry; 11,575; 23.01%	Stockwell Day; 25,278; 50.24%	John Harrop; 9,660; 19.20%	Karan Bowyer; 3,802; 7.56%		Stockwell Day
Okanagan—Shuswap	Will Hansma; 12,330; 22.62%	Colin Mayes; 24,448; 44.86%	Alice Brown; 14,551; 26.70%	Harry Naegel; 2,215; 4.06%	Gordon Campbell (NA); 425 0.78%	Darrel Stinson†
Okanagan—Shuswap	Will Hansma; 12,330; 22.62%	Colin Mayes; 24,448; 44.86%	Alice Brown; 14,551; 26.70%	Harry Naegel; 2,215; 4.06%	Neville O'Grady (CAP); 172 0.32%	Darrel Stinson†
Okanagan—Shuswap	Will Hansma; 12,330; 22.62%	Colin Mayes; 24,448; 44.86%	Alice Brown; 14,551; 26.70%	Harry Naegel; 2,215; 4.06%	Darren Seymour (Ind.); 359 0.66%	Darrel Stinson†
Prince George—Peace River	Nathan Bauder; 5,889; 15.74%	Jay Hill; 22,412; 59.89%	Malcolm James Crockett; 6,377; 17.04%	Hilary Crowley; 2,394; 6.40%	Donna Young (Ind.); 351; 0.94%	Jay Hill
Skeena—Bulkley Valley	Gordon Stamp-Vincent; 4,845; 12.66%	Mike Scott; 12,630; 33.00%	Nathan Cullen; 18,496; 48.33%	Phil Brienesse; 1,064; 2.78%	Rod Taylor (CHP); 1,235; 3.23%	Nathan Cullen

== 2004 ==
Electoral district	Candidates						Incumbent
Electoral district	Liberal	Conservative	NDP	Green	Canadian Action	Other	Incumbent
Cariboo—Prince George	Gurbux Saini; 8,397; 19.89%	Dick Harris; 19,721; 46.72%	Rick Smith; 11,183; 26.49%	Douglas Gook; 1,798; 4.26%	Bev Collins; 408; 0.97%	Carol Lee Chapman (M-L); 79 0.19%	Dick Harris
Cariboo—Prince George	Gurbux Saini; 8,397; 19.89%	Dick Harris; 19,721; 46.72%	Rick Smith; 11,183; 26.49%	Douglas Gook; 1,798; 4.26%	Bev Collins; 408; 0.97%	Mike Orr (Ind.); 478 1.13%	merged district
Cariboo—Prince George	Gurbux Saini; 8,397; 19.89%	Dick Harris; 19,721; 46.72%	Rick Smith; 11,183; 26.49%	Douglas Gook; 1,798; 4.26%	Bev Collins; 408; 0.97%	Jeff Paetkau (Libert.); 148 0.35%	Philip Mayfield†
Kamloops—Thompson	John O'Fee; 14,434; 28.26%	Betty Hinton; 20,611; 40.35%	Brian Carroll; 13,379; 26.19%	Grant Fraser; 2,213; 4.33%		Arjun Singh (Ind.); 440; 0.86%	Betty Hinton
Kelowna	Vern Nielsen; 14,109; 26.50%	Werner Schmidt; 25,553; 48.00%	Starleigh Grass; 8,954; 16.82%	Kevin Ade; 3,903; 7.33%	Michael Cassidyne-Hook; 271; 0.51%	Huguette Plourde (Mar.); 447; 0.84%	Werner Schmidt
Kootenay—Columbia	Ross Priest; 7,351; 17.92%	Jim Abbott; 21,336; 52.02%	Brent Bush; 9,772; 23.82%	Carmen Gustafson; 2,558; 6.24%			Jim Abbott
North Okanagan—Shuswap	Will Hansma; 11,636; 22.48%	Darrel Stinson; 24,014; 46.39%	Alice Brown; 12,528; 24.20%	Erin Nelson; 2,333; 4.51%	Claire A. Foss; 257; 0.50%	Gordon Campbell (NA); 401 0.77%	Darrel Stinson
North Okanagan—Shuswap	Will Hansma; 11,636; 22.48%	Darrel Stinson; 24,014; 46.39%	Alice Brown; 12,528; 24.20%	Erin Nelson; 2,333; 4.51%	Claire A. Foss; 257; 0.50%	K. No. Daniels (NA); 104 0.20%	Darrel Stinson
North Okanagan—Shuswap	Will Hansma; 11,636; 22.48%	Darrel Stinson; 24,014; 46.39%	Alice Brown; 12,528; 24.20%	Erin Nelson; 2,333; 4.51%	Claire A. Foss; 257; 0.50%	Blair T. Longley (Mar.); 492 0.95%	Darrel Stinson
Okanagan—Coquihalla	Vanessa Sutton; 11,212; 23.05%	Stockwell Day; 24,220; 49.79%	Joyce Procure; 9,509; 19.55%	Harry Naegal; 2,896; 5.95%	Lelannd Haver; 259; 0.53%	Jack William Peach (Mar.); 548; 1.13%	Stockwell Day
Prince George—Peace River	Arleene Thorpe; 4,988; 13.76%	Jay Hill; 21,281; 58.71%	Michael Hunter; 7,501; 20.70%	Hilary Crowley; 2,073; 5.72%	Harley J. Harasym; 301; 0.83%	Tara Rimstad (M-L); 101; 0.28%	Jay Hill
Skeena—Bulkley Valley	Miles Richardson; 7,965; 21.59%	Andy Burton; 12,434; 33.70%	Nathan Cullen; 13,706; 37.14%	Roger Colin Benham; 1,225; 3.32%		Frank Martin (M-L); 161 0.44%	Andy Burton
Skeena—Bulkley Valley	Miles Richardson; 7,965; 21.59%	Andy Burton; 12,434; 33.70%	Nathan Cullen; 13,706; 37.14%	Roger Colin Benham; 1,225; 3.32%		Rod Taylor (CHP); 1,408 3.82%	Andy Burton
Southern Interior	Doug Stanley; 8,310; 17.96%	Jim Gouk; 16,940; 36.60%	Alex Atamanenko; 16,260; 35.13%	Scott Leyland; 3,663; 7.91%	Farlie Paynter; 87; 0.19%	Karine Cyr (Mar.); 391 0.84%	Jim Gouk
Southern Interior	Doug Stanley; 8,310; 17.96%	Jim Gouk; 16,940; 36.60%	Alex Atamanenko; 16,260; 35.13%	Scott Leyland; 3,663; 7.91%	Farlie Paynter; 87; 0.19%	Robert Schuster (Ind.); 591 1.28%	Jim Gouk
Southern Interior	Doug Stanley; 8,310; 17.96%	Jim Gouk; 16,940; 36.60%	Alex Atamanenko; 16,260; 35.13%	Scott Leyland; 3,663; 7.91%	Farlie Paynter; 87; 0.19%	Brian Sproule (M-L); 39 0.08%	Jim Gouk

1. Cariboo-Prince George
2. Kamloops-Thompson-Cariboo
3. Kelowna-Lake Country
4. Kootenay-Columbia
5. Okanagan-Coquihalla
6. Okanagan-Shuswap
7. Prince George-Peace River
8. Skeena-Bulkley Valley
9. British Columbia Southern Interior
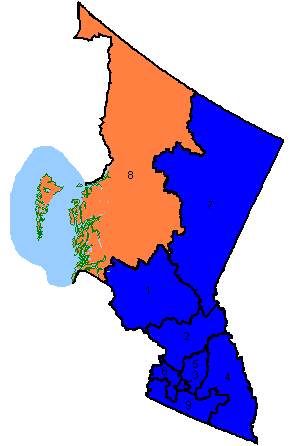
Key map

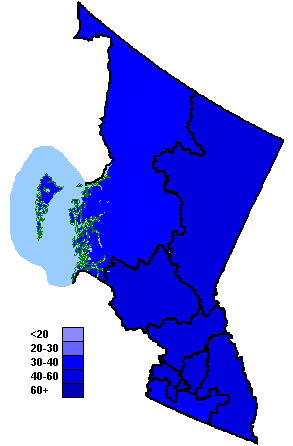
Conservative Party of Canada

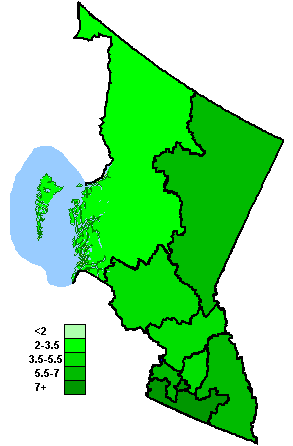
Green Party of Canada

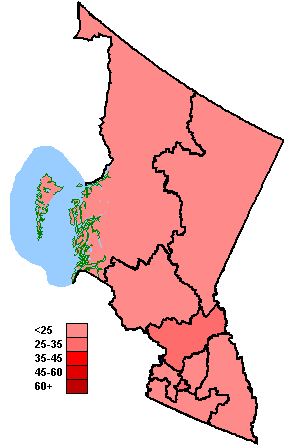
Liberal Party of Canada

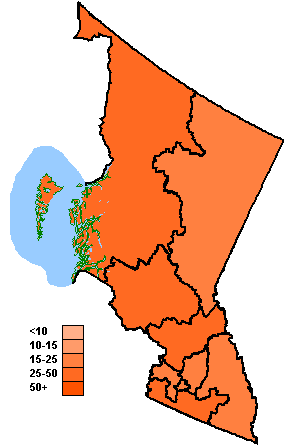
New Democratic Party

== 2000 ==
Electoral district	Candidates						Incumbent
Electoral district	Liberal	Canadian Alliance	NDP	PC	Green	Other	Incumbent
Cariboo—Chilcotin	John McCarvill; 6,555; 20.34%	Philip Mayfield; 19,213; 59.63%	Raymond John Skelly; 2,915; 9.05%	Pamela J. Culbert; 2,822; 8.76%		Al Charlebois (M-L); 124 0.38%	Philip Mayfield
Cariboo—Chilcotin	John McCarvill; 6,555; 20.34%	Philip Mayfield; 19,213; 59.63%	Raymond John Skelly; 2,915; 9.05%	Pamela J. Culbert; 2,822; 8.76%		William Turkel (Ind.); 591 1.83%	Philip Mayfield
Kamloops, Thompson and Highland Valleys	Jon Moser; 7,582; 15.63%	Betty Hinton; 23,577; 48.59%	Nelson Riis; 13,600; 28.03%	Randy Patch; 3,217; 6.63%		Ernie Schmidt (CAP); 544; 1.12%	Nelson Riis
Kelowna	Joe Leask; 13,564; 23.86%	Werner Schmidt; 33,810; 59.47%	John O. Powell; 3,572; 6.28%	Doug Mallo; 4,708; 8.28%		Jack W. Peach (CAP); 1,199; 2.11%	Werner Schmidt
Kootenay—Boundary—Okanagan	Bill Barlee; 11,357; 27.36%	Jim Gouk; 19,386; 46.70%	Don Scarlett; 4,091; 9.85%	Michele Elise Duncan; 2,147; 5.17%	Andrew Shadrack; 2,689; 6.48%	Bev Collins (CAP); 762 1.84%	Jim Gouk
Kootenay—Boundary—Okanagan	Bill Barlee; 11,357; 27.36%	Jim Gouk; 19,386; 46.70%	Don Scarlett; 4,091; 9.85%	Michele Elise Duncan; 2,147; 5.17%	Andrew Shadrack; 2,689; 6.48%	Annie Holtby (NLP); 191 0.46%	Jim Gouk
Kootenay—Boundary—Okanagan	Bill Barlee; 11,357; 27.36%	Jim Gouk; 19,386; 46.70%	Don Scarlett; 4,091; 9.85%	Michele Elise Duncan; 2,147; 5.17%	Andrew Shadrack; 2,689; 6.48%	Dan Loehndorf (Mar.); 889 2.14%	Jim Gouk
Kootenay—Columbia	Delvin R. Chatterson; 5,581; 14.74%	Jim Abbott; 25,663; 67.78%	Andrea Dunlop; 3,297; 8.71%	Jerry Pirie; 2,165; 5.72%	Jubilee Rose Cacaci; 1,158; 3.06%		Jim Abbott
Okanagan—Coquihalla	Tom Chapman; 9,923; 20.46%	Stockwell Day; 28,794; 59.37%	Ken Ellis; 4,096; 8.45%	Gordon John Seiter; 2,939; 6.06%	Harry Naegel; 1,110; 2.29%	Clay Harmon (NA); 95 0.20%	Stockwell Day
Okanagan—Coquihalla	Tom Chapman; 9,923; 20.46%	Stockwell Day; 28,794; 59.37%	Ken Ellis; 4,096; 8.45%	Gordon John Seiter; 2,939; 6.06%	Harry Naegel; 1,110; 2.29%	Elizabeth Innes (NLP); 167 0.34%	Stockwell Day
Okanagan—Coquihalla	Tom Chapman; 9,923; 20.46%	Stockwell Day; 28,794; 59.37%	Ken Ellis; 4,096; 8.45%	Gordon John Seiter; 2,939; 6.06%	Harry Naegel; 1,110; 2.29%	Dorothy-Jean O'Donnell (M-L); 99 0.20%	Stockwell Day
Okanagan—Coquihalla	Tom Chapman; 9,923; 20.46%	Stockwell Day; 28,794; 59.37%	Ken Ellis; 4,096; 8.45%	Gordon John Seiter; 2,939; 6.06%	Harry Naegel; 1,110; 2.29%	Larry Taylor (CAP); 461 0.95%	Stockwell Day
Okanagan—Coquihalla	Tom Chapman; 9,923; 20.46%	Stockwell Day; 28,794; 59.37%	Ken Ellis; 4,096; 8.45%	Gordon John Seiter; 2,939; 6.06%	Harry Naegel; 1,110; 2.29%	Teresa Taylor (Mar.); 818 1.69%	Stockwell Day
Okanagan—Shuswap	Marvin Friesen; 9,855; 20.59%	Darrel Stinson; 29,345; 61.30%	Wayne Alexander Fowler; 4,060; 8.48%	Sheila Marguerite Wardman; 3,096; 6.47%		K. No Daniels (NA); 447 0.93%	Darrel Stinson
Okanagan—Shuswap	Marvin Friesen; 9,855; 20.59%	Darrel Stinson; 29,345; 61.30%	Wayne Alexander Fowler; 4,060; 8.48%	Sheila Marguerite Wardman; 3,096; 6.47%		Vera Gottlieb (CAP); 724 1.51%	Darrel Stinson
Okanagan—Shuswap	Marvin Friesen; 9,855; 20.59%	Darrel Stinson; 29,345; 61.30%	Wayne Alexander Fowler; 4,060; 8.48%	Sheila Marguerite Wardman; 3,096; 6.47%		David Lethbridge (Comm.); 347 0.72%	Darrel Stinson
Prince George—Bulkley Valley	Jeannette Townsend; 8,202; 23.43%	Dick Harris; 20,596; 58.84%	Mark Walsh; 2,029; 5.80%	Oliver William Ray; 2,448; 6.99%	John Grogan; 793; 2.27%	David MacKay (M-L); 84 0.24%	Dick Harris
Prince George—Bulkley Valley	Jeannette Townsend; 8,202; 23.43%	Dick Harris; 20,596; 58.84%	Mark Walsh; 2,029; 5.80%	Oliver William Ray; 2,448; 6.99%	John Grogan; 793; 2.27%	John Van der Woude (NA); 152 0.43%	Dick Harris
Prince George—Bulkley Valley	Jeannette Townsend; 8,202; 23.43%	Dick Harris; 20,596; 58.84%	Mark Walsh; 2,029; 5.80%	Oliver William Ray; 2,448; 6.99%	John Grogan; 793; 2.27%	Suzanne Woodrow (CAP); 701 2.00%	Dick Harris
Prince George—Peace River	Arleene Thorpe; 5,319; 15.53%	Jay Hill; 23,840; 69.62%	Lenart Nelson; 1,597; 4.66%	Jan Christiansen; 2,103; 6.14%	Hilary Crowley; 744; 2.17%	Henry A. Dunbar (CAP); 562 1.64%	Jay Hill
Prince George—Peace River	Arleene Thorpe; 5,319; 15.53%	Jay Hill; 23,840; 69.62%	Lenart Nelson; 1,597; 4.66%	Jan Christiansen; 2,103; 6.14%	Hilary Crowley; 744; 2.17%	Colby Nicholson (M-L); 80 0.23%	Jay Hill
Skeena	Rhoda Witherly; 8,714; 29.12%	Andy Burton; 12,787; 42.73%	Larry Guno; 6,273; 20.96%	Devin Lee Glowinski; 965; 3.22%	Roger Colin Benham; 688; 2.30%	Cliff Brown (NLP); 140 0.47%	Mike Scott†
Skeena	Rhoda Witherly; 8,714; 29.12%	Andy Burton; 12,787; 42.73%	Larry Guno; 6,273; 20.96%	Devin Lee Glowinski; 965; 3.22%	Roger Colin Benham; 688; 2.30%	George Joseph (NA); 361 1.21%	Mike Scott†
