= Canadian House of Commons Standing Committee on Fisheries and Oceans =

Standing committee of the House of Commons of Canada

The House of Commons Standing Committee on Fisheries and Oceans (FOPO) is a standing committee of the House of Commons of Canada.

== Mandate ==
The committee studies, reviews, and makes recommendations on all matters related to Canadian fisheries, oceans, and the Canadian Coast Guard. FOPO conducts pre-budget consultations, briefing sessions by departmental officials on federal government programs, and consideration of proposed federal legislation, among others.

== Membership ==
As of the 45th Canadian Parliament:

Party	Member	Riding
Liberal	Patrick Weiler, chair	West Vancouver—Sunshine Coast—Sea to Sky Country, BC
Conservative	Mel Arnold, vice chair	Kamloops—Shuswap—Central Rockies, BC
Bloc Québécois	Alexis Deschênes, vice chair	Gaspésie—Les Îles-de-la-Madeleine—Listuguj, QC
Liberal	Paul Connors	Avalon, NL
Liberal	Serge Cormier	Acadie—Bathurst, NB
Conservative	Mike Dawson	Miramichi—Grand Lake, NB
Conservative	Aaron Gunn	North Island—Powell River, BC
Liberal	Ernie Klassen	South Surrey—White Rock, BC
Liberal	Bobby Morrissey	Egmont, PE
Conservative	Clifford Small	Central Newfoundland, NL
