= Kamloops—Shuswap—Central Rockies =

Federal electoral district in British Columbia, Canada

British Columbia electoral district
- Interactive map of riding boundaries from the 2025 federal election. Point indicates the city of Kamloops.

Federal electoral district
- Legislature: House of Commons
MP
Mel Arnold
Conservative
- District created: 2023
- First contested: 2025
- District webpage: profile, map

Demographics
- Population (2021): 109,218
- Electors (2025): 91,588
- Area (km²): 32,871
- Pop. density (per km²): 3.3
- Census division(s): Columbia-Shuswap, North Okanagan, Thompson-Nicola
- Census subdivision(s): Kamloops (part), Salmon Arm, Revelstoke, Armstrong, Spallumcheen (part), Golden, Enderby, Sicamous, Chase, Enderby

Kamloops—Shuswap—Central Rockies is a federal electoral district in British Columbia, Canada. It came into effect upon the call of the 2025 Canadian federal election.

== Geography ==
Under the 2022 Canadian federal electoral redistribution the riding will be created out of Kamloops—Thompson—Cariboo, Kootenay—Columbia and North Okanagan—Shuswap.

- The southeastern third of Kamloops, the northern half of Spallumcheen, the municipalities of Armstrong, Chase, Enderby, Golden, Revelstoke, Salmon Arm, Sicamous, the regional district electoral areas of Columbia Shuswap A, Columbia Shuswap B, Columbia Shuswap C, Columbia Shuswap D, Columbia Shuswap E, Columbia Shuswap F, North Okanagan F, Thompson-Nicola L (Grasslands), a small part of Thompson-Nicola P (Rivers and the Peaks) around Adams Lake, and the Indian Reserves Chum Creek 2, Enderby 2, Hustalen 1, Neskonlith, North Bay 5, Okanagan (Part) 1, Quaaout 1, Sahhaltkum 4, Salmon River 1, Scotch Creek 4, Stequmwhulpa 5, Switsemalph and Switsemalph 3.

== Demographics ==
According to the 2021 Canadian census

Languages: 91.7% English, 1.9% French, 1.5% German

Religions: 60.9% No religion, 36.2% Christian (9.5% Catholic, 4.4% United Church, 3.4% Anglican, 2.0% Baptist, 1.6% Lutheran, 15.3% Other)

Median income: $39,600 (2020)

Average income: $50,240 (2020)

Panethnic groups in Kamloops—Shuswap—Central Rockies (2021)
| Panethnic group | 2021 | |
| Panethnic group | Pop. | % |
|---|---|---|
| European (Note: Statistic includes all persons that did not make up part of a visible minority or an indigenous identity.) | 92,235 | 85.92% |
| Indigenous | 9,360 | 8.72% |
| East Asian (Note: Statistic includes total responses of "Chinese", "Korean", and "Japanese" under visible minority section on census.) | 1,665 | 1.55% |
| South Asian | 1,505 | 1.4% |
| Southeast Asian (Note: Statistic includes total responses of "Filipino" and "Southeast Asian" under visible minority section on census.) | 1,055 | 0.98% |
| African | 640 | 0.6% |
| Latin American | 430 | 0.4% |
| Middle Eastern (Note: Statistic includes total responses of "West Asian" and "Arab" under visible minority section on census.) | 250 | 0.23% |
| Other/multiracial (Note: Statistic includes total responses of "Visible minority, n.i.e." and "Multiple visible minorities" under visible minority section on census.) | 210 | 0.2% |
| Total responses | 107,345 | 98.28% |
| Total population | 109,220 | 100% |
Notes: Totals greater than 100% due to multiple origin responses. Demographics based on 2022 Canadian federal electoral redistribution riding boundaries.

== History ==
| Parliament | Years | Member | Party |
|---|---|---|---|
Kamloops—Shuswap—Central Rockies; Riding created from Kamloops—Thompson—Cariboo, Kootenay—Columbia, and North Okanagan—Shuswap
| 45th | 2025–present | Mel Arnold | Conservative |

== Electoral results ==
2025 Canadian federal election
** Preliminary results — Not yet official **
| Party | Candidate | Votes | % | ±% | Expenditures |
|---|---|---|---|---|---|
| Conservative | Mel Arnold | 35,238 | 52.21 | +7.20 | |
| Liberal | Ken Robertson | 26,295 | 38.96 | +22.35 | |
| New Democratic | Phaedra Idzan | 3,660 | 5.42 | –19.62 | |
| Green | Owen Madden | 1,702 | 2.52 | –2.57 | |
| People's | John Michael Henry | 601 | 0.89 | –7.26 | |
| Total valid votes/expense limit | | | | | |
| Total rejected ballots | | | | | |
| Turnout | | 67,496 | 73.22 | | |
| Eligible voters | | 92,185 | | | |
| Conservative notional hold | | Swing | | –7.58 | |
Source: Elections Canada

2021 federal election redistributed results
| Party | Vote | % |
|---|---|---|
| Conservative | 26,749 | 45.01 |
| New Democratic | 14,877 | 25.04 |
| Liberal | 9,869 | 16.61 |
| People's | 4,844 | 8.15 |
| Green | 3,025 | 5.09 |
| Others | 60 | 0.10 |
