= Yolanda Burkhard =

Canadian politician

Mayor of Dawson City, Yukon
- In office 1976–1978
- Preceded by: Colin Mayes
- Succeeded by: Vi Campbell

Personal details
- Born: Yolanda Giacometto; October 27, 1930 Switzerland
- Died: March 31, 1998 (aged 67); Whitehorse, Yukon, Canada
- Spouse: Frank Burkhard (m. 1951)
- Occupation: City clerk

Yolanda Burkhard (née Giacometto; October 27, 1930 – March 31, 1998) was a Canadian politician who served as mayor of Dawson City, Yukon from 1976 to 1978. She was the first woman ever elected mayor of the community; Ione Christensen was elected as the first woman mayor of Whitehorse on the same day.

Born in Switzerland, she was raised there until the death of her father, and then travelled to Dawson City with her mother on what was initially planned as a visit to a family friend. The family ended up settling in the town, where she married Frank Burkhard in 1951. In the 1960s and 1970s, she worked as the city clerk for Dawson City's municipal government, until being dismissed from her position by then-mayor Colin Mayes in 1975. She subsequently worked as a bookkeeper for the local museum, and successfully challenged Mayes in the 1976 municipal election.

In 1977, she took a trip to Bendigo, Victoria, Dawson City's twin town in Australia, to attend the Australian National Gold-Panning Championship.

She stepped down as mayor in 1978, moving to Whitehorse and taking a job with the mining recorder's office, and was succeeded as mayor by Vi Campbell.

She died on March 31, 1998, in Whitehorse. Following her death, MLA Peter Jenkins gave a tribute speech in the Legislative Assembly of Yukon on April 2.
