= Jim Abbott (Canadian politician) =

Canadian politician (1942–2020)

The Honourable James Abbott PC

Member of Parliament for Kootenay—Columbia (Kootenay East; 1993–1997)
- In office October 25, 1993 – May 2, 2011
- Preceded by: Sid Parker
- Succeeded by: David Wilks

Personal details
- Born: August 18, 1942 Toronto, Ontario, Canada
- Died: July 26, 2020 (aged 77) Cranbrook, British Columbia, Canada
- Party: Conservative
- Other political affiliations: Reform (1993–2000); Canadian Alliance (2000–2003)
- Spouse: Jeannette Bryce
- Profession: Businessman, manager
- Portfolio: Parliamentary Secretary to the Minister of International Cooperation

James Edward Abbott, PC (August 18, 1942 – July 26, 2020) was a Canadian politician, a Conservative member of the House of Commons of Canada. Abbott was a member of the Reform Party from 1993 to 2000 and a member of the Canadian Alliance from 2000 to 2004. Originally representing the riding of Kootenay East, he had represented Kootenay—Columbia since the boundaries were redrawn, and the name changed, in 1997. Before retiring, Abbott was the Parliamentary Secretary to the Minister for International Cooperation (Canada). On October 15, 2007, he was sworn in as a member of the Queen's Privy Council for Canada, and as such was entitled to the style "The Honourable" for life.

On June 30, 2010, he attended the inauguration of President Benigno Aquino III in the Philippines, as the representative of Canada.

Abbott died in Cranbrook, British Columbia on July 26, 2020, at the age of 77.

== Electoral record ==
2008 Canadian federal election: Kootenay—Columbia
Party	Candidate	Votes	%	±%	Expenditures
Conservative	Jim Abbott	23,402	59.59	+5.23	$54,210.36
New Democratic	Leon R. Pendleton	8,892	22.64	–3.24	$23,472.17
Green	Ralph Moore	3,933	10.02	+3.91	$1,088.58
Liberal	Betty Aitchison	3,044	7.75	–5.59	$4,917.27
Total valid votes/expense limit		39,271	99.67	–	$99,497.62
Total rejected ballots		131	0.33	+0.02	
Turnout		39,402	59.76	–4.63	
Eligible voters		65,932			
Conservative hold		Swing		+4.24	
Source: Elections Canada

2006 Canadian federal election: Kootenay—Columbia
Party	Candidate	Votes	%	±%	Expenditures
Conservative	Jim Abbott	22,181	54.36	+2.34	$65,258.03
New Democratic	Brent Bush	10,560	25.88	+2.05	$20,927.27
Liberal	Jhim Burwell	5,443	13.34	–4.58	$8,905.01
Green	Clements Verhoeven	2,490	6.10	–0.13	$2,811.27
Canadian Action	Thomas Fredrick Sima	132	0.32	–	none listed
Total valid votes/expense limit		40,806	99.68	–	$91,824.58
Total rejected ballots		129	0.32	–0.00	
Turnout		40,935	64.39	–0.70	
Eligible voters		63,571			
Conservative hold		Swing		+0.14	
Source: Elections Canada

2004 Canadian federal election: Kootenay—Columbia
Party	Candidate	Votes	%	±%	Expenditures
Conservative	Jim Abbott	21,336	52.02	–21.48	$84,755.42
New Democratic	Brent Bush	9,772	23.82	+15.11	$31,852.60
Liberal	Ross Priest	7,351	17.92	+3.18	$36,290.10
Green	Carmen Gustafson	2,558	6.24	+3.18	$768.09
Total valid votes/expense limit		41,017	99.68	–	$89,385.88
Total rejected ballots		130	0.32	–0.05	
Turnout		41,147	65.09	–0.07	
Eligible voters		63,216			
Conservative hold		Swing		–18.30	
Source: Elections Canada

2000 Canadian federal election: Kootenay—Columbia
Party	Candidate	Votes	%	±%	Expenditures
Alliance	Jim Abbott	25,663	67.78	+5.86	$62,316
Liberal	Delvin R. Chatterson	5,581	14.74	–2.89	$18,971
New Democratic	Andrea Dunlop	3,297	8.71	–5.49	$3,732
Progressive Conservative	Jerry Pirie	2,165	5.72	+1.63	$340
Green	Jubilee Rose Cacaci	1,158	3.06	+0.88	none listed
Total valid votes		37,864	99.63		
Total rejected ballots		139	0.37	+0.00	
Turnout		38,003	65.16	+0.26	
Eligible voters		58,326			
Alliance hold		Swing		+4.38	
Source: Elections Canada

1997 Canadian federal election: Kootenay—Columbia
Party	Candidate	Votes	%	Expenditures
Reform	Jim Abbott	22,387	61.91	$49,956
Liberal	Mark Shmigelsky	6,373	17.63	$28,560
New Democratic	Greg Edwards	5,133	14.20	$29,778
Progressive Conservative	Mark Palmer	1,479	4.09	$322
Green	Anna Rowe	786	2.17	none listed
Total valid votes		36,158	99.64	
Total rejected ballots		131	0.36	
Turnout		36,289	64.90	
Eligible voters		55,916		
Reform notional hold		Swing		–
This riding was created from parts of Kootenay East and Kootenay West—Revelstoke, both of which elected Reform candidates in the previous election. Jim Abbott was the incumbent from Kootenay East.
Source: Elections Canada
