= Mel Arnold =

Canadian politician (born 1959)

Mel Arnold MP
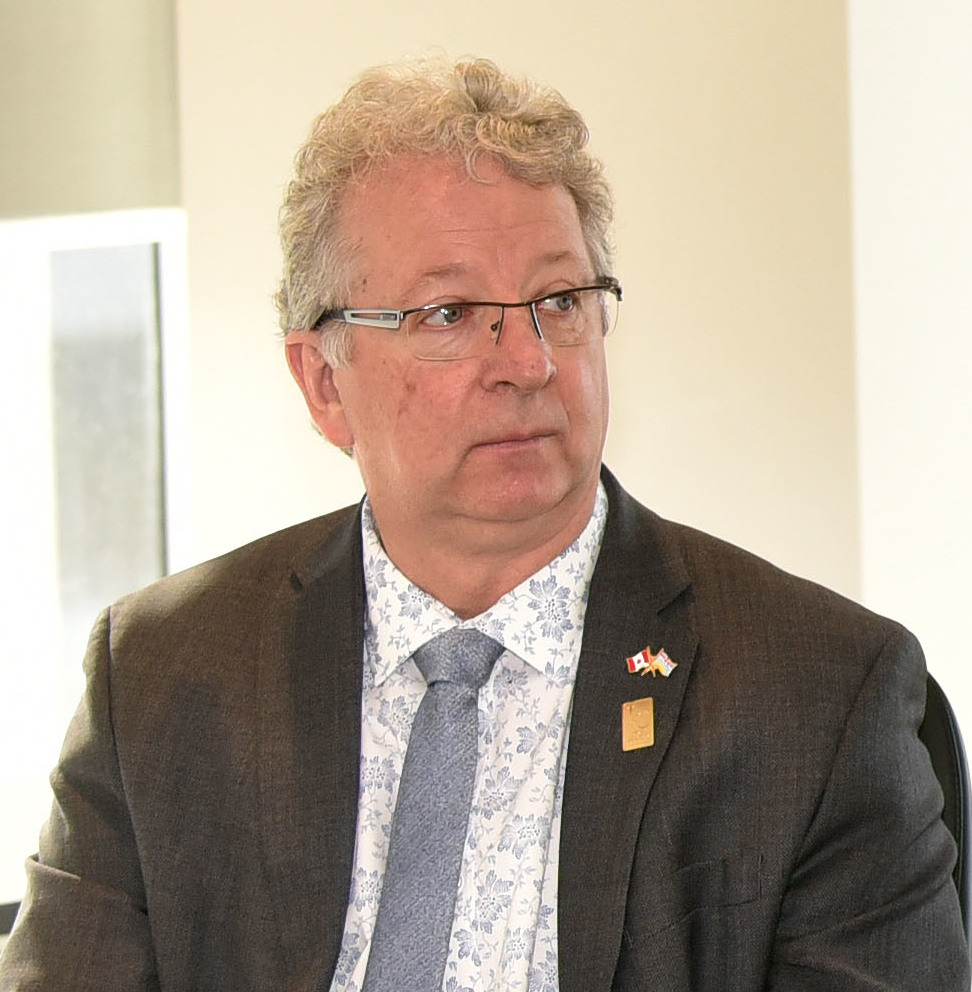
- Arnold in 2018

Member of Parliament for Kamloops—Shuswap—Central Rockies North Okanagan—Shuswap (2015–2025)
- Incumbent
- Assumed office October 19, 2015
- Preceded by: Colin Mayes

Personal details
- Born: 1958 or 1959 (age 66–67) Notch Hill, Blind Bay, British Columbia, Canada
- Party: Conservative

Melvin John Arnold MP (born 1958) is a Canadian politician who was elected as a Member of Parliament in the House of Commons of Canada to represent the federal electoral district of North Okanagan—Shuswap during the 2015 Canadian federal election. The district was changed for the 2025 election; Arnold won the new Kamloops—Shuswap—Central Rockies district in that year.

Arnold was active on the boards of local service clubs, including the BC Wildlife Federation and Canadian Wildlife Federation, where he held the role of President for two terms. Before serving as a member of Parliament, he served on his Salmon Arm's environmental advisory council for eight years. In 2010 he was appointed to the B.C. government's Species at Risk Task Force.

== Politics ==
Arnold voted in support of Bill C-233 - An Act to amend the Criminal Code (sex-selective abortion), which would make it an indictable or a summary offence for a medical practitioner to knowingly perform an abortion solely on the grounds of the child's genetic sex.

He was elected vice chair of the Canadian House of Commons Standing Committee on Fisheries and Oceans in the 45th Canadian Parliament in 2025.

== Electoral record ==
2025 Canadian federal election: Kamloops—Shuswap—Central Rockies
** Preliminary results — Not yet official **
Party	Candidate	Votes	%	±%	Expenditures
Conservative	Mel Arnold	35,238	52.21	+7.20	
Liberal	Ken Robertson	26,295	38.96	+22.35	
New Democratic	Phaedra Idzan	3,660	5.42	–19.62	
Green	Owen Madden	1,702	2.52	–2.57	
People's	John Michael Henry	601	0.89	–7.26	
Total valid votes/expense limit					
Total rejected ballots					
Turnout		67,496	73.22		
Eligible voters		92,185			
Conservative notional hold		Swing		–7.58	
Source: Elections Canada

2021 Canadian federal election
Party	Candidate	Votes	%	±%	Expenditures
Conservative	Mel Arnold	33,626	46.4	-2.4	$66,332.75
New Democratic	Ron Johnston	13,929	19.2	+3.9	$6,364.37
Liberal	Shelley Desautels	13,666	18.9	-3.7	$44,668.61
People's	Kyle Delfing	7,209	10.0	+7.3	$38,335.73
Green	Andrea Gunner	3,967	5.5	-5.1	$6,405.15
Total valid votes/Expense limit		72,397	99.5	–	$143,796.18
Total rejected ballots		372	0.5		
Turnout		72,769	65.2		
Eligible voters		111,599			
Conservative hold		Swing		-3.2	
Source: Elections Canada

2019 Canadian federal election: North Okanagan—Shuswap
Party	Candidate	Votes	%	±%	Expenditures
Conservative	Mel Arnold	36,154	48.76	+9.46	$84,389.20
Liberal	Cindy Derkaz	16,783	22.64	-7.31	none listed
New Democratic	Harwinder Sandhu	11,353	15.31	-10.29	none listed
Green	Marc Reinarz	7,828	10.56	+5.40	$11,446.63
People's	Kyle Delfing	2,027	2.73		$5,718.06
Total valid votes/expense limit		74,145	99.40		
Total rejected ballots		449	0.60	+0.39	
Turnout		74,594	69.25	-2.61	
Eligible voters		107,712			
Conservative hold		Swing		+8.39	
Source: Elections Canada

2015 Canadian federal election
Party	Candidate	Votes	%	±%	Expenditures
Conservative	Mel Arnold	27,490	39.30	-16.06	$94,762.90
Liberal	Cindy Derkaz	20,949	29.95	+22.48	$76,594.10
New Democratic	Jacqui Gingras	17,907	25.60	-0.88	$81,410.56
Green	Chris George	3,608	5.16	-5.53	$6,792.93
Total valid votes/Expense limit		69,954	99.78		$255,644.99
Total rejected ballots		152	0.22	–	
Turnout		70,106	72.84	–	
Eligible voters		96,243			
Conservative hold		Swing		-19.27	
Source: Elections Canada
