= Darrel Stinson =

Canadian politician and businessman

Darrel Stinson MP

Member of Parliament for North Okanagan—Shuswap (Okanagan—Shuswap; 1993–2004)
- In office October 25, 1993 – January 23, 2006
- Preceded by: Lyle MacWilliam
- Succeeded by: Colin Mayes

Personal details
- Born: June 5, 1945 (age 80) Vancouver, British Columbia, Canada
- Party: Conservative (2003–present)
- Other political affiliations: Reform (1993–2000); Alliance (2000–2003)

Darrel Stinson (born June 5, 1945) is a retired politician and businessman in British Columbia, Canada. He was the Member of Parliament (MP) for Okanagan—Shuswap from 1993 until the dissolution of the House of Commons of Canada for the 2006 federal election, and was a member of the Conservative Party of Canada parliamentary caucus.

== Early life and education ==
He was born in Vancouver, British Columbia, but grew up on a ranch. He left school at a young age to work, but returned later in life to get his high school diploma. He eventually became a local businessman in the BC interior and also worked as a mining consultant and prospector.

== Political life ==
Stinson was first elected as a Reform Party MP in the 1993 election. He became recognized for the large cowboy hat he normally wore and for his outspoken conservatism.

In his first term, Stinson was often the centre of controversy. He was criticized for suggesting the best way to prevent spousal abuse was to give women handguns. In 1997, after Liberal MP John Cannis heckled him as a racist in the House of Commons, Stinson replied "Do you have the fortitude or the gonads to stand up and come across here and say that to me, you son of a bitch?" Eventually the Speaker chided both men for unparliamentary language. Later that same year, after Progressive Conservative leader Jean Charest called him a bigot in a heated exchange, Stinson replied that Charest was a "fat little, chubby, little sucker." In 1999, he was accused of challenging Liberal MP Steve Mahoney to fight.

He was one of a handful of Reform MPs to oppose the idea of a United Alternative, being unwilling to sacrifice Reform principles to facilitate a merger with the PC Party. He eventually agreed to the creation of the Canadian Alliance (CA) with elements of the PC Party, and became a member of that party when it was created. He backed Stockwell Day in the 2000 CA leadership election, and was given a number of critics positions when Day became leader.

Stinson was much angered by the Liberal victory in the 2000 election and attended the inaugural convention of the Alberta Independence Party along with fellow CA MP Myron Thompson. This flirtation with Alberta separatism sparked controversy, and Stinson was moved by Day to the backbenches. Stinson and Thompson were soon after at the centre of another controversy when it emerged they had convinced Day to hire a private investigator to investigate Liberals.

Stinson remained one of Day's strongest supporters, firmly against the Alliance members who tried to oust him. Stinson was reportedly one of the MPs most firmly opposed to allowing the dissident MPs back into the party after Day resigned.

He continued his opposition to any merger with the Tories and, in 2003, was the only Canadian Alliance MP to vote against Stephen Harper's merger plan in a caucus meeting, but he later came to support the new party.

In 2004, he was diagnosed with bladder cancer, and his frequent absences from parliament played an important role in the finely-balanced minority government. In the crucial May 19, 2005, vote on the Canadian budget, the 152–152 tie was broken by the Speaker voting in favour, ensuring the continuity of the government. As Stinson was undergoing surgery at the time, a Liberal MP agreed to sit out the vote as a courtesy.

Due to his illness he retired from parliament following the fall of the Paul Martin government on November 28, 2005.
