= David Wilks =

Canadian politician (born 1959)

Mayor of Sparwood
- Incumbent
- Assumed office October 20, 2018
- Preceded by: Cal McDougall
- In office November 19, 2005 – November 19, 2011
- Preceded by: Cal McDougall
- Succeeded by: Cal McDougall

Member of Parliament for Kootenay—Columbia
- In office May 2, 2011 – October 19, 2015
- Preceded by: Jim Abbott
- Succeeded by: Wayne Stetski

City Councillor of Sparwood
- In office November 16, 2002 – November 19, 2005

Personal details
- Born: September 23, 1959 (age 67) Lethbridge, Alberta, Canada
- Party: Conservative
- Profession: Police officer, politician

David Wilks (born September 23, 1959) is a Canadian politician, currently serving as the mayor of Sparwood, British Columbia following a term as a Member of Parliament in the House of Commons of Canada. He was elected in the Kootenay—Columbia riding as a member of the Conservative Party of Canada in the 2011 election. In the 41st Canadian Parliament, Wilks was appointed to the Standing Committee on Aboriginal Affairs and Northern Development and introduced one piece of legislation, a private members bill called An Act to amend the Criminal Code (kidnapping of young person) (C-299) which sought a minimum sentence of five years in prison for someone convicted of kidnapping a person under the age of 16.

Wilks, originally from Lethbridge, is a former Royal Canadian Mounted Police (RCMP) officer and entrepreneur. Between 1980 and 2000 he was assigned to several RCMP detachments in British Columbia. He was elected as a councillor for the District of Sparwood in 2002 and then as mayor in 2005. As mayor, he was appointed to the Regional District of East Kootenay and became the chair of the Regional Board. Wilks sought and won the Conservative Party nomination to replace retiring Kootenay—Columbia Member of Parliament Jim Abbott and was elected to Parliament in 2011.

== Background ==
David Wilks was born and raised in Lethbridge but after graduating high school he moved to Saskatoon. He worked briefly in the potash industry while undergoing recruitment process. He attended RCMP Academy in Regina. His first assignment as an RCMP officer was to the Terrace detachment in 1980. Over his 20-year RCMP career he was subsequently assigned to the detachments in New Aiyansh, Golden, Penticton and Sparwood. He retired from the RCMP in 2000 while in Sparwood and bought a family entertainment business called Sparwood Bowl and Billiards Inc. with his wife.

In the 2002 BC municipal elections Wilks first stood for election. He was elected to a three-year term as a Sparwood municipal councillor. In the 2005 municipal elections he put his name forward in the mayoral election and successfully defeated the incumbent. No one challenged Wilks during the 2008 municipal elections so he was acclaimed to a new 3-year term as mayor. Along with being mayor, he was appointed by the Sparwood council to the Board of Directors at the Regional District of East Kootenay. Wilks and Sparwood gained national attention in late-December 2008 when an avalanche killed eight men on snowmobiles; Wilks established public trust accounts for the families of the victims and helped organize a memorial service which the Prime Minister attended. At the Union of British Columbia Municipalities, Wilks advocated expanding the Meth Watch program to include a registration system to track people to purchase components used in making methamphetamine. At the Regional District, Wilks advocated for the provincial government to give the proposed Jumbo Glacier Resort municipal status, removing the responsibility for public consultation and zoning from the Regional District and placing it with the province or a locally elected or appointed council. His March 2006 resolution was defeated, with Wilks being the only director to vote in favour. Wilks re-introduced the motion in August 2009 and it was approved by the Board, though the province did not take any action. In December 2009, the Regional Board elected Wilks to be the chair of the Regional District.

== Federal politics ==
In February 2010, Jim Abbott, the local member of parliament for the past 17 years, announced he would not seek re-election. Wilks endorsed Bill Bennett to replace Abbott but Bennett declined. The 50-year-old Wilks subsequently announced his intent to seek the Conservative Party nomination for the next election. He stepped down from the Chair position at the Regional District to better focus on his campaign but remained a director. In the March 2011 Conservative Party nomination election, Wilks faced three other candidates: a 29-year-old town councillor from Creston, a lawyer from Cranbrook, and an engineer also from Cranbrook. Wilks campaign unknowingly employed a con artist who stole an undisclosed sum of money before disappearing. Despite the theft, Wilks won the nomination. During the campaign for the federal election, Wilks faced former Invermere mayor Mark Shmigelsky for NDP, and Kimberley residents Betty Aitchison, Bill Green, and Brent Bush. Wilks was seen as the front-runner but his campaign was criticized for avoiding all-candidate forums and debates, skipping the forums in Revelstoke, Kimberley, and Invermere. During the campaign, Wilks noted that he would seek to direct federal funds to improving the Trans-Canada Highway, "proper" punishment for criminals, and "proper" funding for the military, noting that his son was currently serving in the military as a combat engineer in Afghanistan. Wilks won the Kootenay—Columbia riding with 56% of the vote.

As the 41st Parliament began, Wilks was not selected to Prime Minister Stephen Harper's cabinet. He was appointed to the 'Standing Committee on Aboriginal Affairs and Northern Development' and the 'Standing Joint Committee on Scrutiny of Regulations'. In the House of Commons, Wilks used his time on the floor on June 15, 2011, to describe why he sees the New Democratic Party as a "radical hard left" political party. Following the high-profile kidnapping of a three-year-old boy from his hometown of Sparwood, Wilks introduced a private members bill (C-299) which would create a five-year minimum sentence for people convicted of kidnapping a person under the age of 16.

Wilks' comments about the 2012 Canadian federal budget made national headlines in May 2012. Speaking at a meeting with constituents in Revelstoke, Wilks stated his belief that the omnibus budget bill should be split into a series of smaller bills, but that as a backbench MP, he had little alternative but to vote in favour because "that's how Ottawa works." Answering questions from the audience, he indicated that he and other backbenchers had little influence or input on the budget legislation. Two videos of Wilks' comments were posted online, with his permission. Shortly after the story broke, Wilks released a statement to the effect that he was in full support of the budget bill.

During the 2015 Canadian federal election, Wilks made headlines for saying that it was "not fair" for Canadians to expect the government to take action on missing and murdered Indigenous women and that the matter should be dealt with simply as part of "missing and murdered people" in general, without using the term "Indigenous." Wilks ended up losing his seat to Wayne Stetski of the NDP in one of the closest races of the country by just 282 votes.

In 2018 Wilks let his name stand for Mayor for the District of Sparwood. He was successful for a four-year term that was renewed in 2022. In 2024 Wilks was elected a Director at Large for the Union of British Columbia Municipalities at the convention in September.

2015 Canadian federal election: Kootenay—Columbia
Party	Candidate	Votes	%	±%	Expenditures
New Democratic	Wayne Stetski	23,529	37.23	–1.62	$90,414.74
Conservative	David Wilks	23,247	36.78	–13.31	$108,293.89
Liberal	Don Johnston	12,315	19.48	+16.00	$11,677.75
Green	Bill Green	4,115	6.51	+0.08	$43,461.84
Total valid votes/expense limit		63,206	99.69	–	$279,227.99
Total rejected ballots		197	0.31		
Turnout		63,403	72.97		
Eligible voters		86,895			
New Democratic gain from Conservative		Swing		+5.84	
Source: Elections Canada

2011 Canadian federal election: Kootenay—Columbia
Party	Candidate	Votes	%	±%	Expenditures
Conservative	David Wilks	23,910	55.88	–3.71	$93,549.27
New Democratic	Mark Shmigelsky	14,199	33.18	+10.54	$44,811.15
Green	Bill Green	2,547	5.95	–4.06	$10,953.73
Liberal	Betty Aitchison	1,496	3.50	–4.25	$5,660.99
Independent	Brent Bush	636	1.49	–	$3,290.05
Total valid votes/expense limit		42,788	99.67	–	$103,426.93
Total rejected ballots		142	0.33	–0.00	
Turnout		42,930	63.45	+3.69	
Eligible voters		67,663			
Conservative hold		Swing		–7.13	
Source: Elections Canada
