= Wayne Stetski =

Canadian politician (born 1952)

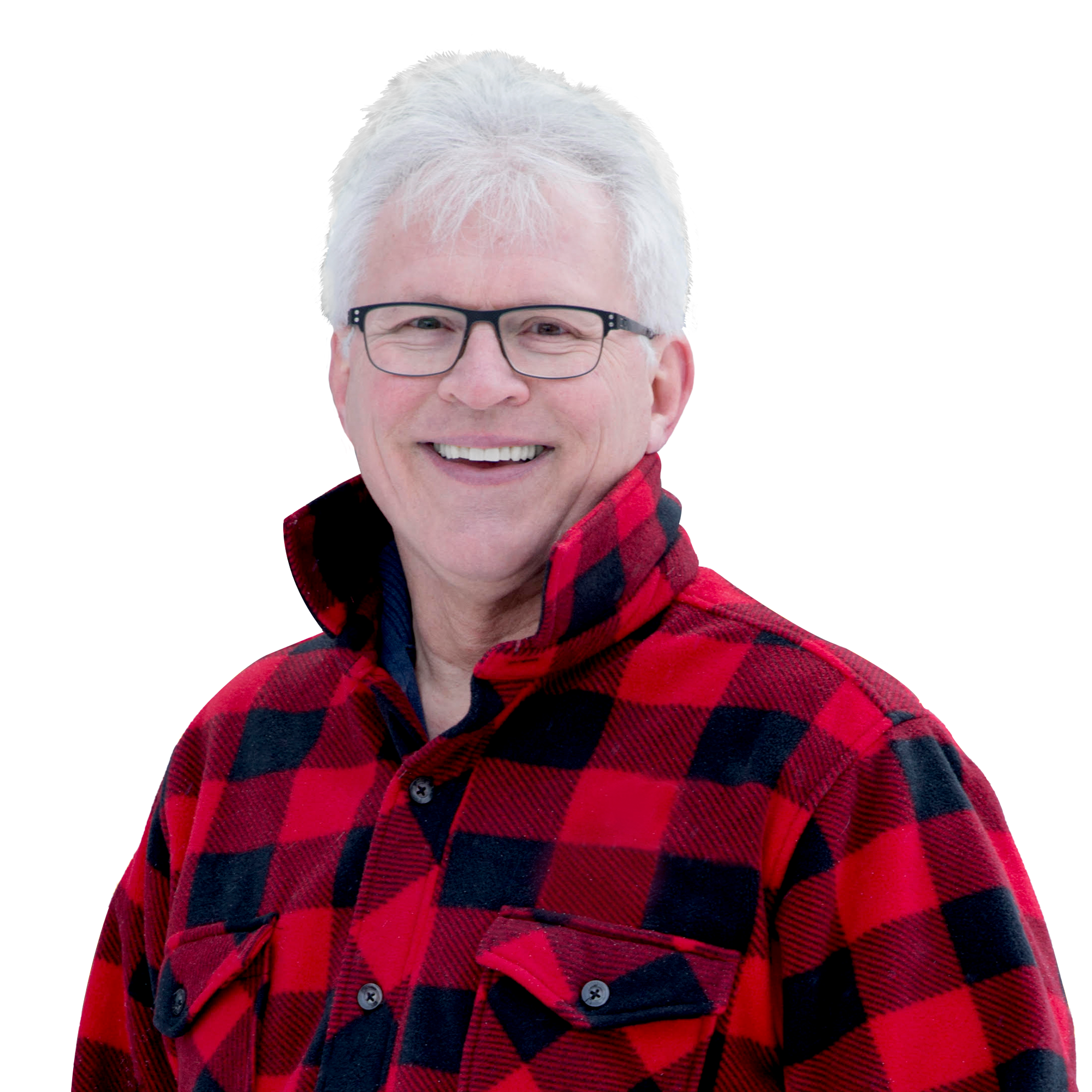

Member of Parliament for Kootenay—Columbia
- In office October 19, 2015 – October 21, 2019
- Preceded by: David Wilks
- Succeeded by: Rob Morrison

Mayor of Cranbrook
- In office December 5, 2011 – December 8, 2014
- Preceded by: Scott Manjak
- Succeeded by: Lee Pratt

Cranbrook City Councillor
- Incumbent
- Assumed office October 27, 2022

Personal details
- Born: May 23, 1952 (age 73) Churchill, Manitoba, Canada
- Party: New Democratic Party (federal); New Democratic Party of British Columbia (provincial)
- Spouse: Audrey

Wayne L. Stetski (born May 23, 1952) is a Canadian politician and former provincial park Regional Manager. He served as the Member of Parliament for Kootenay—Columbia in the 42nd Canadian Parliament. He was elected to that position in the 2015 Canadian federal election as a member of the New Democratic Party. During that parliament he sponsored two private member bills: one to make the Friday before Thanksgiving Day be known as "National Local Food Day" and another to add various lakes and rivers to Navigable Waters Protection Act. Stetski acted as the NDP Critic for National Parks for the duration of the 42nd Canadian Parliament. He lost re-election in the 2019 Canadian federal election.

Prior to being elected to parliament, Stetski sought election as mayor of Cranbrook, British Columbia in 2008, 2011, and 2014. Though he lost the 2008 election, he won in 2011 and served three years as mayor. He lost his re-election bid, as other Cranbrook incumbents in 2014 Prior to being mayor, Stetski worked 35 years with national and provincial parks and protected areas, including as the Kootenay Regional Manager for the BC Ministry of Environment.

== Career ==
Stetski had a 35-year career working with national and provincial parks and protected areas. His career began as a naturalist for Pacific Rim National Park Reserve as a summer job while attending the University of Manitoba where he earned a science degree in ecology and education. He worked for Manitoba Parks before moving to British Columbia where he worked as a BC Parks manager for visitor services. He transitioned to the Manager for East Kootenay parks in 1980, and later became the regional manager of the Kootenay parks. Stetski had lived in Cranbrook since 1990 and been an active member in the community, raising three children and volunteering with the a local church and theatre, coaching hockey and baseball. Stetski changed jobs in 2009 to become the manager of the non-profit group East Kootenay Conservation.

== Politics ==
With the mayor of Cranbrook retiring, the 56 year old Stetski stood for election to replace him in the 2008 local government election. With 46% of the vote, he lost to Cranbrook councillor Scott Manjak. Stetski became a board member with the local United Way and the vice-president of the Citizens for a Livable Cranbrook Society during its opposition to urban expansion on the land across the Cranbrook Community Forest. In 2011, with Manjak opting not to seek re-election, Stetski again ran for mayor. This time, he won the election with 45% of the vote. As mayor, he was also appointed to the board of the Regional District of East Kootenay and the Columbia River Treaty Government's Committee. He stood for re-election in 2014 but lost, along with all other Cranbrook incumbents, with 38% of the vote.

The 62 year old Stetski quickly rebounded by being acclaimed, in March 2015, the NDP nominee for the Kootenay—Columbia riding in the upcoming October 2015 federal election. Though incumbent the Member of Parliament, David Wilks of the Conservative Party, was seeking re-election, polling found the riding too close to call with both Wilks and Stetski polling at 37% among decided voters. Stetski did go on to win the election with 37% of the vote but his NDP was reduced to third party status to a Liberal Party majority. During the 42nd Canadian Parliament Stetski was the NDP critic for National Parks issues and sponsored two private member bills. On June 1, 2016, he introduced Bill C-281, titled the National Local Food Day Act, which sought to make the Friday before Thanksgiving Day is to be known as "National Local Food Day". The bill was passed by the House of Commons on November 8, 2018, but was blocked by the Conservative Party in the Senate. His second private member bill, Bill C-385, sought to re-insert numerous lakes and rivers such as Trout Lake, Duncan Lake, Windermere Lake, Columbia Lake, Kicking Horse River, Elk River, and Salmo River back into the Navigable Waters Protection Act. However, Bill C-385 did not advance past first reading as the government bill C-69 was amending the same act to re-define what water bodies and watercourses are deemed to be reviewable as navigable waters.

Stetski was seeking re-election as the Kootenay—Columbia member of parliament in the October 2019 federal election. He was defeated by retired law enforcement administrator Rob Morrison of the Conservative Party, and was contested by retired forester Rick Stewart for the People's Party, advocate Trev Miller for the Animal Protection Party and Nelson residents Abra Brynne for the Green Party and Terry Tiessen for the Libertarian Party. Stetski's last day in office was October 21, 2019.

In 2022 Stetski was elected as a Cranbrook, BC City Councillor for a four-year term.

== Electoral record ==
=== Federal ===
2021 Canadian federal election: Kootenay—Columbia
Party	Candidate	Votes	%	±%	Expenditures
Conservative	Rob Morrison	28,056	43.2	-1.6	$110,837.35
New Democratic	Wayne Stetski	23,986	36.9	+2.5	$127,647.85
Liberal	Robin Goldsbury	5,879	9.0	-0.1	$10,113.73
People's	Sarah Bennett	4,467	6.9	+4.8	$0.00
Green	Rana Nelson	2,577	4.0	-5.1	$6,932.17
Total valid votes/expense limit		64,965	99.5	–	$152,723.52
Total rejected ballots		317	0.5		
Turnout		65,282	68.4		
Eligible voters		95,518			
Conservative hold		Swing		-2.1	
Source: Elections Canada

2019 Canadian federal election: Kootenay—Columbia
Party	Candidate	Votes	%	±%	Expenditures
Conservative	Rob Morrison	30,168	44.81	+8.03	$100,780.99
New Democratic	Wayne Stetski	23,149	34.38	-2.84	$91,351.20
Liberal	Robin Goldsbury	6,151	9.14	-10.35	none listed
Green	Abra Brynne	6,145	9.13	+2.62	$17,085.86
People's	Rick Stewart	1,378	2.05	-	none listed
Animal Protection	Trev Miller	339	0.50	-	$1,850.63
Total valid votes/expense limit		67,330	99.61		
Total rejected ballots		266	0.39	+0.08	
Turnout		67,596	72.68	-0.28	
Eligible voters		93,002			
Conservative gain from New Democratic		Swing		+5.44	
Source: Elections Canada

2015 Canadian federal election: Kootenay—Columbia
Party	Candidate	Votes	%	±%	Expenditures
New Democratic	Wayne Stetski	23,529	37.23	-1.62	$90,414.74
Conservative	David Wilks	23,247	36.78	-13.31	$108,293.89
Liberal	Don Johnston	12,315	19.48	+16.00	$11,677.75
Green	Bill Green	4,115	6.51	+0.08	$43,921.84
Total valid votes/expense limit		63,206	99.69		$279,227.99
Total rejected ballots		197	0.31	–	
Turnout		63,403	72.97	–	
Eligible voters		86,895			
New Democratic gain from Conservative		Swing		+5.84	
Source: Elections Canada

=== Provincial ===
2020 British Columbia general election: Kootenay East
Party	Candidate	Votes	%	±%	Expenditures
Liberal	Tom Shypitka	9,897	57.90	+1.33	$38,182.15
New Democratic	Wayne Stetski	5,499	32.17	+2.5	$19,605.32
Green	Kerri Wall	1,697	9.93	−1.34	$3,805.90
Total valid votes		17,093	100.00	–	
Total rejected ballots					
Turnout					
Registered voters					
Source: Elections BC

=== Municipal ===
2014 Cranbrook Mayoral election
Candidate	Votes	%
Lee Pratt	3,396	58.69
Wayne Stetski	2,192	37.88
John York	144	2.49
Total	5,732	100.00

2011 Cranbrook Mayoral election
Candidate	Votes	%
Wayne Stetski	2,185	44.96
Jim Wavrecan	1,704	35.06
Pat O'Connell	863	17.76
John York	107	2.22
Total	4,859	100.00

2008 Cranbrook Mayoral election
Candidate	Votes	%
Scott Manjak	2,254	51.0
Wayne Stetski	2,050	46.3
John York	119	2.7
Total	4,423	100.00
