= Colin Mayes =

Canadian politician

Member of Parliament for Okanagan—Shuswap
- In office January 23, 2006 – August 4, 2015
- Preceded by: Darrel Stinson
- Succeeded by: Mel Arnold

Chair of the Standing Committee on Aboriginal Affairs
- In office 10 May 2006 – 12 November 2007
- Minister: Jim Prentice; Chuck Strahl
- Preceded by: Maurice Vellacott
- Succeeded by: Barry Devolin

Mayor of Dawson City, Yukon
- In office 1974–1976
- Preceded by: Mike Comadain
- Succeeded by: Yolanda Burkhard

Mayor of Salmon Arm, British Columbia
- In office 1996–2005
- Succeeded by: Marty Bootsma

Personal details
- Born: April 11, 1948 (age 77) New Westminster, British Columbia
- Party: Conservative
- Spouse: Jacquie Mayes
- Profession: Small business owner

Colin N. Mayes, (born April 11, 1948 in New Westminster, British Columbia) is a Canadian politician and was the Member of Parliament for the riding of Okanagan—Shuswap from 2006 to 2015. In the 2006 federal election, he ran as a member of the Conservative Party and won with 44.86% of the vote. Prior to being elected to the House of Commons of Canada, he was elected mayor of Dawson City, Yukon and Salmon Arm, British Columbia. He was a nominated candidate for both the Yukon Conservative Party and the Reform Party of British Columbia. He ran a trucking enterprise in the Yukon, owned a grocery store, and also worked in business development.

He served as chair of the Standing Committee on Aboriginal Affairs and Northern Development and the Subcommittee on Agenda and Procedure of the aforementioned committee, and was also a member of the Liaison Committee and the Standing Committee on Veterans Affairs.

Mayes was the subject of minor controversy when it was reported he had responded to a privately e-mailed racist joke with the comment "good joke".

Mayes voiced his support for private member's bill, motion 312, which would have Canada reexamine at what point human life begins.

He did not run for re-election in 2015 and retired from parliament.
