= Rob Morrison (politician) =

Canadian politician (born 1956)

Rob Morrison MP

Member of Parliament for Columbia—Kootenay—Southern Rockies Kootenay—Columbia (2019–2025)
- Incumbent
- Assumed office October 21, 2019
- Preceded by: Wayne Stetski

Personal details
- Born: May 3, 1956 (age 70)
- Party: Conservative Party of Canada
- Profession: Public servant

Rob Morrison MP (born May 3, 1956) is a Canadian politician who was elected to represent the riding of Kootenay—Columbia in the House of Commons of Canada in the 2019 Canadian federal election. He is a retired RCMP officer and diplomat.

At the time of the 2025 Canadian federal election, he lived in Creston, British Columbia.

== Electoral record ==
2025 Canadian federal election: Columbia—Kootenay—Southern Rockies
Party	Candidate	Votes	%	±%	Expenditures
Conservative	Rob Morrison	36,081	50.43	+6.81	$129,739.83
Liberal	Reggie Goldsbury	20,184	28.21	+19.27	$9,780.49
New Democratic	Kallee Lins	12,871	17.99	–18.65	$44,659.04
Green	Steven Maffioli	1,064	1.49	–2.22	$4,424.00
Independent	James Wiedrick	856	1.20	–	$17,998.72
People's	Laurie Baird	486	0.68	–6.41	none listed
Total valid votes/expense limit		71,542	99.56	–	$164,117.06
Total rejected ballots		317	0.44		
Turnout		71,859	73.30		
Eligible voters		98,030			
Conservative notional hold		Swing		–	
Source: Elections Canada

2021 Canadian federal election: Kootenay—Columbia
Party	Candidate	Votes	%	±%	Expenditures
Conservative	Rob Morrison	28,056	43.19	–1.62	$110,837.35
New Democratic	Wayne Stetski	23,986	36.92	+2.54	$126,656.37
Liberal	Robin Goldsbury	5,879	9.05	–0.09	$10,113.73
People's	Sarah Bennett	4,467	6.88	+4.83	$8,501.61
Green	Rana Nelson	2,577	3.97	–5.16	$6,932.17
Total valid votes/expense limit		64,965	99.51	–	$152,723.52
Total rejected ballots		317	0.49	+0.09	
Turnout		65,282	67.95	–4.74	
Eligible voters		96,079			
Conservative hold		Swing		–2.08	
Source: Elections Canada

2019 Canadian federal election: Kootenay—Columbia
Party	Candidate	Votes	%	±%	Expenditures
Conservative	Rob Morrison	30,168	44.81	+8.03	$97,741.37
New Democratic	Wayne Stetski	23,149	34.38	–2.84	$85,912.16
Liberal	Robin Goldsbury	6,151	9.14	–10.35	$17,427.85
Green	Abra Brynne	6,145	9.13	+2.62	$17,085.86
People's	Rick Stewart	1,378	2.05	–	$3,593.43
Animal Protection	Trev Miller	339	0.50	–	$1,850.63
Total valid votes/expense limit		67,330	99.61	–	$145,436.06
Total rejected ballots		266	0.39	+0.08	
Turnout		67,596	72.68	–0.28	
Eligible voters		93,002			
Conservative gain from New Democratic		Swing		+5.44	
Source: Elections Canada
