= North Okanagan—Shuswap =

Former federal electoral district in British Columbia, Canada

British Columbia electoral district
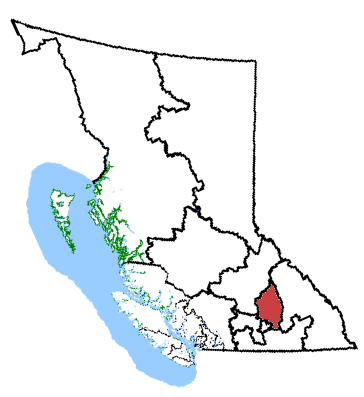
- Okanagan—Shuswap in relation to other British Columbia federal electoral districts

Federal electoral district
- Legislature: House of Commons
MP
Mel Arnold
Conservative
- District created: 2003
- District abolished: 2023
- First contested: 2004
- Last contested: 2021
- District webpage: profile, map

Demographics
- Population (2011): 121,474
- Electors (2015): 94,179
- Area (km²): 16,734
- Pop. density (per km²): 7.3
- Census subdivision(s): Vernon, Armstrong, Coldstream, Salmon Arm, Spallumcheen, North Okanagan C, North Okanagan F, Columbia-Shuswap C, Columbia-Shuswap D, Thompson-Nicola P (Rivers and the Peaks),

North Okanagan—Shuswap was a federal electoral district in the province of British Columbia, Canada, that was represented in the House of Commons of Canada from 1988 to 2025. The district was sporadically known as Okanagan—Shuswap. In the 2022 Canadian federal electoral redistribution, it was split into Kamloops—Shuswap—Central Rockies, Kamloops—Thompson—Nicola, and Vernon—Lake Country—Monashee. It was dissolved upon the call of the 2025 Canadian federal election in March 2025.

== Geography ==
North Okanagan–Shuswap consists of Subdivision C of Columbia-Shuswap Regional District, and the North Okanagan Regional District. This electoral district includes the towns of Salmon Arm, Vernon, Coldstream, Lumby and Armstrong.

== Demographics ==
Panethnic groups in North Okanagan—Shuswap (2011−2021)
| Panethnic group | 2021 | | 2016 | | 2011 | |
| Panethnic group | Pop. | % | Pop. | % | Pop. | % |
|---|---|---|---|---|---|---|
| European (Note: Statistic includes all persons that did not make up part of a visible minority or an indigenous identity.) | 115,350 | 86.41% | 107,490 | 88.28% | 106,200 | 89.69% |
| Indigenous | 11,425 | 8.56% | 9,805 | 8.05% | 9,275 | 7.83% |
| East Asian (Note: Statistic includes total responses of "Chinese", "Korean", and "Japanese" under visible minority section on census.) | 1,900 | 1.42% | 1,625 | 1.33% | 1,135 | 0.96% |
| South Asian | 1,650 | 1.24% | 1,055 | 0.87% | 595 | 0.5% |
| Southeast Asian (Note: Statistic includes total responses of "Filipino" and "Southeast Asian" under visible minority section on census.) | 1,490 | 1.12% | 875 | 0.72% | 475 | 0.4% |
| African | 700 | 0.52% | 350 | 0.29% | 230 | 0.19% |
| Latin American | 440 | 0.33% | 255 | 0.21% | 220 | 0.19% |
| Middle Eastern (Note: Statistic includes total responses of "West Asian" and "Arab" under visible minority section on census.) | 300 | 0.22% | 175 | 0.14% | 110 | 0.09% |
| Other (Note: Statistic includes total responses of "Visible minority, n.i.e." and "Multiple visible minorities" under visible minority section on census.) | 235 | 0.18% | 125 | 0.1% | 175 | 0.15% |
| Total responses | 133,485 | 97.78% | 121,760 | 97.72% | 118,405 | 97.47% |
| Total population | 136,520 | 100% | 124,605 | 100% | 121,474 | 100% |
Notes: Totals greater than 100% due to multiple origin responses. Demographics based on 2012 Canadian federal electoral redistribution riding boundaries.

According to the 2016 Canadian census; 2013 representation

Languages: 90.7% English, 2.7% German, 1.5% French
Religions (2011): 52.3% Christian (11.9% Catholic, 8.3% United Church, 6.0% Anglican, 3.0% Baptist, 2.9% Lutheran, 1.6% Pentecostal, 1.1% Presbyterian, 17.5% Other), 45.3% No religion
Median income (2015): $30,855
Average income (2015): $41,500

== History ==
This district was created in 1987 from Kamloops—Shuswap and Okanagan North ridings.

In 1996, the riding was abolished and replaced by "North Okanagan–Shuswap". In 1997, the name of this riding was changed to "Okanagan—Shuswap". There were no elections during this time. The riding was abolished again in 2003, and was again replaced by a riding called "North Okanagan—Shuswap". In 2004, the name was changed back to "Okanagan—Shuswap".

The 2012 federal electoral boundaries redistribution concluded that the boundaries of Okanagan—Shuswap should be adjusted, and a slightly modified electoral district will be contested in future elections under the name "North Okanagan—Shuswap". The redefined North Okanagan—Shuswap gains an area previously in the district of Kootenay—Columbia comprising the small community of Needles and its environs. These new boundaries were legally defined in the 2013 representation order, and came into effect upon the call of the 42nd Canadian federal election, held in October 2015.

== Members of Parliament ==
This riding has elected the following members of Parliament:

| Parliament | Years | Member | Party |
|---|---|---|---|
Okanagan—Shuswap; Riding created from Kamloops—Shuswap and Okanagan North
| 34th | 1988–1993 | Lyle MacWilliam | New Democratic |
| 35th | 1993–1997 | Darrel Stinson | Reform |
| 36th | 1997–2000 | Darrel Stinson | Reform |
| 36th | 2000–2000 | Darrel Stinson | Alliance |
| 37th | 2000–2003 | Darrel Stinson | Alliance |
| 37th | 2003–2004 | Darrel Stinson | Conservative |
North Okanagan—Shuswap
| 38th | 2004–2006 | Darrel Stinson | Conservative |
Okanagan—Shuswap
| 39th | 2006–2008 | Colin Mayes | Conservative |
| 40th | 2008–2011 | Colin Mayes | Conservative |
| 41st | 2011–2015 | Colin Mayes | Conservative |
North Okanagan—Shuswap
| 42nd | 2015–2019 | Mel Arnold | Conservative |
| 43rd | 2019–2021 | Mel Arnold | Conservative |
| 44th | 2021–2025 | Mel Arnold | Conservative |
Riding dissolved into Kamloops—Shuswap—Central Rockies, Kamloops—Thompson—Nicola, and Vernon—Lake Country—Monashee

== Election results ==
View source data.
Graph of election results in North Okanagan—Shuswap (minor parties that never got 2% of the vote or didn't run consistently are omitted)

=== North Okanagan—Shuswap, 2015–2025 ===
2021 Canadian federal election
| Party | Candidate | Votes | % | ±% | Expenditures |
|---|---|---|---|---|---|
| Conservative | Mel Arnold | 33,626 | 46.45 | –2.31 | $66,318.51 |
| New Democratic | Ron Johnston | 13,929 | 19.24 | +3.93 | $6,364.37 |
| Liberal | Shelley Desautels | 13,666 | 18.88 | –3.76 | $44,668.61 |
| People's | Kyle Delfing | 7,209 | 9.96 | +7.22 | $38,335.73 |
| Green | Andrea Gunner | 3,967 | 5.48 | –5.08 | $4,985.50 |
| Total valid votes/expense limit | | 72,397 | 99.49 | – | $143,796.18 |
| Total rejected ballots | | 372 | 0.51 | –0.09 | |
| Turnout | | 72,769 | 64.78 | –4.47 | |
| Eligible voters | | 112,329 | | | |
| Conservative hold | | Swing | | –3.12 | |
Source: Elections Canada

2019 Canadian federal election
| Party | Candidate | Votes | % | ±% | Expenditures |
|---|---|---|---|---|---|
| Conservative | Mel Arnold | 36,154 | 48.76 | +9.46 | $68,251.58 |
| Liberal | Cindy Derkaz | 16,783 | 22.64 | –7.31 | $87,574.32 |
| New Democratic | Harwinder Sandhu | 11,353 | 15.31 | –10.29 | $13,852.59 |
| Green | Marc Reinarz | 7,828 | 10.56 | +5.40 | $9,953.69 |
| People's | Kyle Delfing | 2,027 | 2.73 | – | $5,718.06 |
| Total valid votes/expense limit | | 74,145 | 99.40 | – | $135,980.25 |
| Total rejected ballots | | 449 | 0.60 | +0.39 | |
| Turnout | | 74,594 | 69.25 | –2.61 | |
| Eligible voters | | 107,712 | | | |
| Conservative hold | | Swing | | +8.39 | |
Source: Elections Canada

2015 Canadian federal election
| Party | Candidate | Votes | % | ±% | Expenditures |
|---|---|---|---|---|---|
| Conservative | Mel Arnold | 27,490 | 39.30 | –16.06 | $94,762.90 |
| Liberal | Cindy Derkaz | 20,949 | 29.95 | +22.48 | $76,594.10 |
| New Democratic | Jacqui Gingras | 17,907 | 25.60 | –0.88 | $70,915.92 |
| Green | Chris George | 3,608 | 5.16 | –5.53 | $6,792.93 |
| Total valid votes/expense limit | | 69,954 | 99.78 | – | $255,644.99 |
| Total rejected ballots | | 152 | 0.22 | | |
| Turnout | | 70,106 | 71.86 | | |
| Eligible voters | | 97,554 | | | |
| Eligible voters | | 97,554 | | | |
| Conservative hold | | Swing | | –19.27 | |
Source: Elections Canada

2011 federal election redistributed results
| Party | Vote | % |
|---|---|---|
| Conservative | 31,510 | 55.36 |
| New Democratic | 15,075 | 26.48 |
| Green | 6,082 | 10.68 |
| Liberal | 4,252 | 7.47 |
| Independent | 4 | 0.01 |

=== Okanagan—Shuswap, 2006–2015 ===
2011 Canadian federal election: Okanagan—Shuswap
| Party | Candidate | Votes | % | ±% | Expenditures |
|---|---|---|---|---|---|
| Conservative | Colin Mayes | 31,439 | 55.45 | +3.73 | $64,103.09 |
| New Democratic | Nikki Inouye | 14,955 | 26.38 | +6.68 | $16,845.40 |
| Green | Greig Crockett | 6,058 | 10.68 | –6.62 | $27,968.92 |
| Liberal | Janna Francis | 4,246 | 7.49 | –2.51 | $32,261.66 |
| Total valid votes/expense limit | | 56,698 | 99.76 | – | $100,337.66 |
| Total rejected ballots | | 135 | 0.24 | –0.01 | |
| Turnout | | 56,833 | 61.94 | +1.22 | |
| Eligible voters | | 91,762 | | | |
| Conservative hold | | Swing | | –1.47 | |
Source: Elections Canada

2008 Canadian federal election: Okanagan—Shuswap
| Party | Candidate | Votes | % | ±% | Expenditures |
|---|---|---|---|---|---|
| Conservative | Colin Mayes | 28,002 | 51.72 | +6.86 | $57,429.05 |
| New Democratic | Alice Brown | 10,664 | 19.70 | –7.00 | $17,107.25 |
| Green | Huguette Allen | 9,368 | 17.30 | +13.24 | $30,203.25 |
| Liberal | Janna Francis | 5,414 | 10.00 | –12.62 | $25,640.54 |
| Independent | Gordie Campbell | 416 | 0.77 | –0.67 | none listed |
| Canadian Action | Darren Seymour | 278 | 0.51 | +0.20 | $34.27 |
| Total valid votes/expense limit | | 54,142 | 99.75 | – | $96,363.61 |
| Total rejected ballots | | 137 | 0.25 | –0.07 | |
| Turnout | | 54,279 | 60.71 | –3.64 | |
| Eligible voters | | 89,400 | | | |
| Conservative hold | | Swing | | +6.93 | |
Source: Elections Canada

2006 Canadian federal election: Okanagan—Shuswap
| Party | Candidate | Votes | % | ±% | Expenditures |
|---|---|---|---|---|---|
| Conservative | Colin Mayes | 24,448 | 44.86 | –1.53 | $65,954.99 |
| New Democratic | Alice Brown | 14,551 | 26.70 | +2.50 | $32,589.71 |
| Liberal | Will Hansma | 12,330 | 22.62 | +0.15 | $35,992.73 |
| Green | Harry Naegel | 2,215 | 4.06 | –0.44 | none listed |
| Independent | Gordie Campbell | 425 | 0.78 | –0.01 | none listed |
| Independent | Darren Seymour | 359 | 0.66 | – | $606.87 |
| Canadian Action | Neville O'Grady | 172 | 0.32 | –0.18 | none listed |
| Total valid votes/expense limit | | 54,500 | 99.68 | – | $87,928.16 |
| Total rejected ballots | | 174 | 0.32 | – | |
| Turnout | | 54,674 | 64.35 | – | |
| Eligible voters | | 84,961 | | | |
| Conservative hold | | Swing | | –2.01 | |
Source: Elections Canada

=== North Okanagan—Shuswap, 2004–2006 ===
2004 Canadian federal election
| Party | Candidate | Votes | % | ±% | Expenditures |
|---|---|---|---|---|---|
| Conservative | Darrel Stinson | 24,014 | 46.39 | –21.36 | $73,003.05 |
| New Democratic | Alice Brown | 12,528 | 24.20 | +15.72 | $36,933.66 |
| Liberal | Will Hansma | 11,636 | 22.48 | +1.89 | $49,489.23 |
| Green | Erin Nelson | 2,333 | 4.51 | – | $697.87 |
| Marijuana | Blair Longley | 492 | 0.95 | – | none listed |
| Independent | Gordie Campbell | 401 | 0.77 | – | none listed |
| Canadian Action | Claire Foss | 257 | 0.50 | –1.02 | $1,559.30 |
| Independent | K. No. (Kathleen) Daniels | 104 | 0.20 | –0.73 | none listed |
| Total valid votes/expense limit | | 51,765 | 99.67 | – | $84,025.42 |
| Total rejected ballots | | 174 | 0.34 | +0.09 | |
| Turnout | | 51,939 | 63.69 | – | |
| Eligible voters | | 81,546 | | | |
| Conservative hold | | Swing | | –18.54 | |
Change for the Conservatives is based on the total of the Canadian Alliance and the Progressive Conservatives.
Source: Elections Canada

=== Okanagan—Shuswap, 1988–2004 ===
2000 Canadian federal election: Okanagan—Shuswap
| Party | Candidate | Votes | % | ±% | Expenditures |
|---|---|---|---|---|---|
| Alliance | Darrel Stinson | 29,345 | 61.30 | +8.17 | $62,411 |
| Liberal | Marvin Friesen | 9,855 | 20.59 | –4.08 | $41,376 |
| New Democratic | Wayne Alexander Fowler | 4,060 | 8.48 | –3.95 | $4,575 |
| Progressive Conservative | Sheila Marguerite Wardman | 3,096 | 6.47 | –0.26 | $2,992 |
| Canadian Action | Vera Gottlieb | 724 | 1.51 | –0.20 | $1,855 |
| Independent | K. No Daniels | 447 | 0.93 | –0.40 | none listed |
| Communist | David Lethbridge | 347 | 0.72 | –0.06 | $304 |
| Total valid votes | | 47,874 | 99.75 | | |
| Total rejected ballots | | 118 | 0.25 | –0.07 | |
| Turnout | | 47,992 | 65.61 | –1.44 | |
| Eligible voters | | 73,143 | | | |
| Alliance hold | | Swing | | +6.12 | |
Change for the Canadian Alliance is based on the Reform Party.
Source: Elections Canada

1997 Canadian federal election: Okanagan—Shuswap
| Party | Candidate | Votes | % | ±% | Expenditures |
|---|---|---|---|---|---|
| Reform | Darrel Stinson | 24,952 | 53.13 | +10.69 | $63,898 |
| Liberal | Lyle MacWilliam | 11,585 | 24.67 | +6.25 | $60,414 |
| New Democratic | Calvin White | 5,839 | 12.43 | –11.30 | $17,699 |
| Progressive Conservative | Norm Crerar | 3,160 | 6.73 | –3.14 | $18,143 |
| Canadian Action | Claire Foss | 802 | 1.71 | +1.55 | $5,555 |
| Independent | David Lethbridge | 370 | 0.79 | – | $1,657 |
| Independent | Gordie Campbell | 257 | 0.55 | +0.12 | none listed |
| Total valid votes | | 46,965 | 99.69 | | |
| Total rejected ballots | | 147 | 0.31 | –0.04 | |
| Turnout | | 47,112 | 67.06 | –1.12 | |
| Eligible voters | | 70,258 | | | |
| Reform hold | | Swing | | +2.22 | |
Liberal candidate Lyle MacWilliam gained 0.92 percentage points from the last election, when he ran as a New Democrat.
Source: Elections Canada

1993 Canadian federal election: Okanagan—Shuswap
| Party | Candidate | Votes | % | ±% |
|---|---|---|---|---|
| Reform | Darrel Stinson | 20,930 | 42.44 | +39.37 |
| New Democratic | Lyle MacWilliam | 11,703 | 23.73 | –19.75 |
| Liberal | Brooke Jeffrey | 9,082 | 18.41 | +2.49 |
| Progressive Conservative | Alice Klim | 4,865 | 9.86 | –26.32 |
| National | Don MacLennan | 2,009 | 4.07 | – |
| Green | Hermann Bruns | 312 | 0.63 | –0.52 |
| Independent | Gordie Campbell | 213 | 0.43 | – |
| Natural Law | Rig Gelfand | 130 | 0.26 | – |
| Canada Party | Claire Foss | 78 | 0.16 | – |
| Total valid votes | | 49,322 | 99.65 | |
| Total rejected ballots | | 175 | 0.35 | +0.02 |
| Turnout | | 49,497 | 68.17 | –12.55 |
| Eligible voters | | 72,604 | | |
| Reform gain from New Democratic | | Swing | | +29.56 |
Source: Elections Canada

1988 Canadian federal election: Okanagan—Shuswap
| Party | Candidate | Votes | % | ±% |
|---|---|---|---|---|
| New Democratic | Lyle MacWilliam | 18,749 | 43.47 | – |
| Progressive Conservative | Jake Spoor | 15,606 | 36.19 | – |
| Liberal | David L. Simpson | 6,868 | 15.92 | – |
| Reform | Donald McDonell | 1,321 | 3.06 | – |
| Green | Connie K. Harris | 495 | 1.15 | – |
| Independent | Kathleen Daniels | 89 | 0.21 | – |
| Total valid votes | | 43,128 | 99.67 | |
| Total rejected ballots | | 143 | 0.33 | – |
| Turnout | | 43,271 | 80.73 | – |
| Eligible voters | | 53,603 | | |
This riding was created from parts of Kamloops—Shuswap and Okanagan North, which elected a New Democrat and a Progressive Conservative, respectively, in the previous election.
Source: Elections Canada

== See also ==
- List of Canadian electoral districts
- Historical federal electoral districts of Canada
