= Columbia—Kootenay—Southern Rockies =

Federal electoral district in British Columbia, Canada

British Columbia electoral district
- Interactive map of riding boundaries from the 2025 federal election

Federal electoral district
- Legislature: House of Commons
MP
Rob Morrison
Conservative
- District created: 1996
- First contested: 1997
- Last contested: 2025
- District webpage: profile, map

Demographics
- Population (2011): 107,589
- Electors (2019): 91,652
- Area (km²): 64,336
- Pop. density (per km²): 1.7
- Census subdivision(s): Cranbrook, Nelson, Kimberley, Trail, Fernie, Creston, Sparwood, Invermere, Elkford, Fruitvale

Columbia—Kootenay—Southern Rockies is a federal electoral district in British Columbia, Canada, that has been represented in the House of Commons of Canada since 1997. Until 2025, the riding was known as Kootenay-Columbia.

== Geography ==
Consisting of:

- (a) the Regional District of East Kootenay;
- (b) that part of the Regional District of Central Kootenay comprising:
  - the villages of Kaslo and Salmo;
  - the Town of Creston;
  - the City of Nelson;
  - subdivisions A, B, C, D, E, F and G;
  - Creston Indian Reserve No. 1;
- (c) that part of the Columbia-Shuswap Regional District comprising:
  - the City of Revelstoke;
  - the Town of Golden;
  - subdivisions A and B; and
- (d) Tobacco Plains Indian Reserve No. 2.

The riding borders the US states of Idaho, Montana and Washington, more than any other Canadian riding.

== History ==
This district was created in 1996 from parts of Kootenay East and Kootenay West—Revelstoke ridings.

It was amended in 2003 to include a small part of Kootenay—Boundary—Okanagan.

The 2012 federal electoral boundaries redistribution concluded that the electoral boundaries of Kootenay—Columbia should be adjusted, and a modified electoral district of the same name will be contested in future elections. The redefined Kootenay—Columbia gains the communities of Nelson, Salmo and Kaslo and their respective surrounding areas from the current electoral district of British Columbia Southern Interior, while losing Nakusp and area to the new district of South Okanagan—West Kootenay and Needles and area to the new district of North Okanagan—Shuswap. These new boundaries were legally defined in the 2013 representation order, which came into effect upon the call of the 42nd Canadian federal election, scheduled for October 2015.

== Demographics ==
Panethnic groups in Kootenay—Columbia (2011−2021)
Panethnic group	2021		2016		2011	
Panethnic group	Pop.	%	Pop.	%	Pop.	%
European (Note: Statistic includes all persons that did not make up part of a visible minority or an indigenous identity.)	103,130	87.28%	98,250	89.24%	96,335	91.17%
Indigenous	9,040	7.65%	7,865	7.14%	6,305	5.97%
South Asian	1,570	1.33%	715	0.65%	705	0.67%
East Asian (Note: Statistic includes total responses of "Chinese", "Korean", and "Japanese" under visible minority section on census.)	1,555	1.32%	1,290	1.17%	1,220	1.15%
Southeast Asian (Note: Statistic includes total responses of "Filipino" and "Southeast Asian" under visible minority section on census.)	1,360	1.15%	890	0.81%	385	0.36%
African	630	0.53%	460	0.42%	255	0.24%
Latin American	455	0.39%	305	0.28%	165	0.16%
Middle Eastern (Note: Statistic includes total responses of "West Asian" and "Arab" under visible minority section on census.)	145	0.12%	70	0.06%	25	0.02%
Other (Note: Statistic includes total responses of "Visible minority, n.i.e." and "Multiple visible minorities" under visible minority section on census.)	270	0.23%	255	0.23%	245	0.23%
Total responses	118,155	97.84%	110,095	97.99%	105,660	98.21%
Total population	120,759	100%	112,354	100%	107,589	100%
Notes: Totals greater than 100% due to multiple origin responses. Demographics based on 2012 Canadian federal electoral redistribution riding boundaries.

== Members of Parliament ==
This riding has elected the following members of Parliament:

Parliament	Years	Member	Party
Kootenay—Columbia; Riding created from Kootenay East and Kootenay West—Revelstoke
36th	1997–2000	Jim Abbott	Reform
36th	2000–2000	Jim Abbott	Alliance
37th	2000–2003	Jim Abbott	Alliance
37th	2003–2004	Jim Abbott	Conservative
38th	2004–2006	Jim Abbott	Conservative
39th	2006–2008	Jim Abbott	Conservative
40th	2008–2011	Jim Abbott	Conservative
41st	2011–2015	David Wilks	Conservative
42nd	2015–2019	Wayne Stetski	New Democratic
43rd	2019–2021	Rob Morrison	Conservative
44th	2021–2025	Rob Morrison	Conservative
Columbia—Kootenay—Southern Rockies
45th	2025–present	Rob Morrison	Conservative

=== Current member of Parliament ===
Its member of Parliament (MP) is Rob Morrison, first elected in 2019 as a Conservative candidate.

== Election results ==
Graph of election results in Kootenay—Columbia (minor parties that never got 2% of the vote or didn't run consistently are omitted) View source data.

=== Columbia—Kootenay—Southern Rockies ===
2025 Canadian federal election
** Preliminary results — Not yet official **
Party	Candidate	Votes	%	±%	Expenditures
Conservative	Rob Morrison	35,830	50.45	+6.83	
Liberal	Reggie Goldsbury	20,007	28.17	+19.23	
New Democratic	Kallee Lins	12,772	17.98	–18.66	
Green	Steven Maffioli	1,056	1.49	–2.22	
Independent	James Wiedrick	850	1.20	N/A	
People's	Laurie Baird	503	0.71	–6.38	
Total valid votes/expense limit					
Total rejected ballots					
Turnout		71,018	72.96		
Eligible voters		97,344			
Conservative notional hold		Swing		–6.20	
Source: Elections Canada

2021 federal election redistributed results
Party	Vote	%
Conservative	27,552	43.62
New Democratic	23,143	36.64
Liberal	5,648	8.94
People's	4,480	7.09
Green	2,341	3.71

=== Kootenay—Columbia ===
2021 Canadian federal election: Kootenay—Columbia
Party	Candidate	Votes	%	±%	Expenditures
Conservative	Rob Morrison	28,056	43.19	–1.62	$110,837.35
New Democratic	Wayne Stetski	23,986	36.92	+2.54	$126,656.37
Liberal	Robin Goldsbury	5,879	9.05	–0.09	$10,113.73
People's	Sarah Bennett	4,467	6.88	+4.83	$8,501.61
Green	Rana Nelson	2,577	3.97	–5.16	$6,932.17
Total valid votes/expense limit		64,965	99.51	–	$152,723.52
Total rejected ballots		317	0.49	+0.09	
Turnout		65,282	67.95	–4.74	
Eligible voters		96,079			
Conservative hold		Swing		–2.08	
Source: Elections Canada

2019 Canadian federal election: Kootenay—Columbia
Party	Candidate	Votes	%	±%	Expenditures
Conservative	Rob Morrison	30,168	44.81	+8.03	$97,741.37
New Democratic	Wayne Stetski	23,149	34.38	–2.84	$85,912.16
Liberal	Robin Goldsbury	6,151	9.14	–10.35	$17,427.85
Green	Abra Brynne	6,145	9.13	+2.62	$17,085.86
People's	Rick Stewart	1,378	2.05	–	$3,593.43
Animal Protection	Trev Miller	339	0.50	–	$1,850.63
Total valid votes/expense limit		67,330	99.61	–	$145,436.06
Total rejected ballots		266	0.39	+0.08	
Turnout		67,596	72.68	–0.28	
Eligible voters		93,002			
Conservative gain from New Democratic		Swing		+5.44	
Source: Elections Canada

2015 Canadian federal election: Kootenay—Columbia
Party	Candidate	Votes	%	±%	Expenditures
New Democratic	Wayne Stetski	23,529	37.23	–1.62	$90,414.74
Conservative	David Wilks	23,247	36.78	–13.31	$108,293.89
Liberal	Don Johnston	12,315	19.48	+16.00	$11,677.75
Green	Bill Green	4,115	6.51	+0.08	$43,461.84
Total valid votes/expense limit		63,206	99.69	–	$279,227.99
Total rejected ballots		197	0.31		
Turnout		63,403	72.97		
Eligible voters		86,895			
New Democratic gain from Conservative		Swing		+5.84	
Source: Elections Canada

2011 federal election redistributed results
Party	Vote	%
Conservative	26,447	50.09
New Democratic	20,510	38.84
Green	3,395	6.43
Liberal	1,841	3.49
Others	610	1.16

2011 Canadian federal election: Kootenay—Columbia
Party	Candidate	Votes	%	±%	Expenditures
Conservative	David Wilks	23,910	55.88	–3.71	$93,549.27
New Democratic	Mark Shmigelsky	14,199	33.18	+10.54	$44,811.15
Green	Bill Green	2,547	5.95	–4.06	$10,953.73
Liberal	Betty Aitchison	1,496	3.50	–4.25	$5,660.99
Independent	Brent Bush	636	1.49	–	$3,290.05
Total valid votes/expense limit		42,788	99.67	–	$103,426.93
Total rejected ballots		142	0.33	–0.00	
Turnout		42,930	63.45	+3.69	
Eligible voters		67,663			
Conservative hold		Swing		–7.13	
Source: Elections Canada

2008 Canadian federal election: Kootenay—Columbia
Party	Candidate	Votes	%	±%	Expenditures
Conservative	Jim Abbott	23,402	59.59	+5.23	$54,210.36
New Democratic	Leon R. Pendleton	8,892	22.64	–3.24	$23,472.17
Green	Ralph Moore	3,933	10.02	+3.91	$1,088.58
Liberal	Betty Aitchison	3,044	7.75	–5.59	$4,917.27
Total valid votes/expense limit		39,271	99.67	–	$99,497.62
Total rejected ballots		131	0.33	+0.02	
Turnout		39,402	59.76	–4.63	
Eligible voters		65,932			
Conservative hold		Swing		+4.24	
Source: Elections Canada

2006 Canadian federal election: Kootenay—Columbia
Party	Candidate	Votes	%	±%	Expenditures
Conservative	Jim Abbott	22,181	54.36	+2.34	$65,258.03
New Democratic	Brent Bush	10,560	25.88	+2.05	$20,927.27
Liberal	Jhim Burwell	5,443	13.34	–4.58	$8,905.01
Green	Clements Verhoeven	2,490	6.10	–0.13	$2,811.27
Canadian Action	Thomas Fredrick Sima	132	0.32	–	none listed
Total valid votes/expense limit		40,806	99.68	–	$91,824.58
Total rejected ballots		129	0.32	–0.00	
Turnout		40,935	64.39	–0.70	
Eligible voters		63,571			
Conservative hold		Swing		+0.14	
Source: Elections Canada

2004 Canadian federal election: Kootenay—Columbia
Party	Candidate	Votes	%	±%	Expenditures
Conservative	Jim Abbott	21,336	52.02	–21.48	$84,755.42
New Democratic	Brent Bush	9,772	23.82	+15.11	$31,852.60
Liberal	Ross Priest	7,351	17.92	+3.18	$36,290.10
Green	Carmen Gustafson	2,558	6.24	+3.18	$768.09
Total valid votes/expense limit		41,017	99.68	–	$89,385.88
Total rejected ballots		130	0.32	–0.05	
Turnout		41,147	65.09	–0.07	
Eligible voters		63,216			
Conservative hold		Swing		–18.30	
Source: Elections Canada

2000 Canadian federal election: Kootenay—Columbia
Party	Candidate	Votes	%	±%	Expenditures
Alliance	Jim Abbott	25,663	67.78	+5.86	$62,316
Liberal	Delvin R. Chatterson	5,581	14.74	–2.89	$18,971
New Democratic	Andrea Dunlop	3,297	8.71	–5.49	$3,732
Progressive Conservative	Jerry Pirie	2,165	5.72	+1.63	$340
Green	Jubilee Rose Cacaci	1,158	3.06	+0.88	none listed
Total valid votes		37,864	99.63		
Total rejected ballots		139	0.37	+0.00	
Turnout		38,003	65.16	+0.26	
Eligible voters		58,326			
Alliance hold		Swing		+4.38	
Source: Elections Canada

1997 Canadian federal election: Kootenay—Columbia
Party	Candidate	Votes	%	Expenditures
Reform	Jim Abbott	22,387	61.91	$49,956
Liberal	Mark Shmigelsky	6,373	17.63	$28,560
New Democratic	Greg Edwards	5,133	14.20	$29,778
Progressive Conservative	Mark Palmer	1,479	4.09	$322
Green	Anna Rowe	786	2.17	none listed
Total valid votes		36,158	99.64	
Total rejected ballots		131	0.36	
Turnout		36,289	64.90	
Eligible voters		55,916		
Reform notional hold		Swing		–
This riding was created from parts of Kootenay East and Kootenay West—Revelstoke, both of which elected Reform candidates in the previous election. Jim Abbott was the incumbent from Kootenay East.
Source: Elections Canada

== Adjacent ridings ==
- British Columbia Southern Interior
- Kamloops—Thompson—Cariboo
- Okanagan—Shuswap

== See also ==
- List of Canadian electoral districts
- Historical federal electoral districts of Canada
