= John R.P. Sclater =

10th Moderator of the United Church of Canada, 1876–1949

The Very Reverend John R.P. Sclater DD, LLD
- Moderator of the United Church of Canada
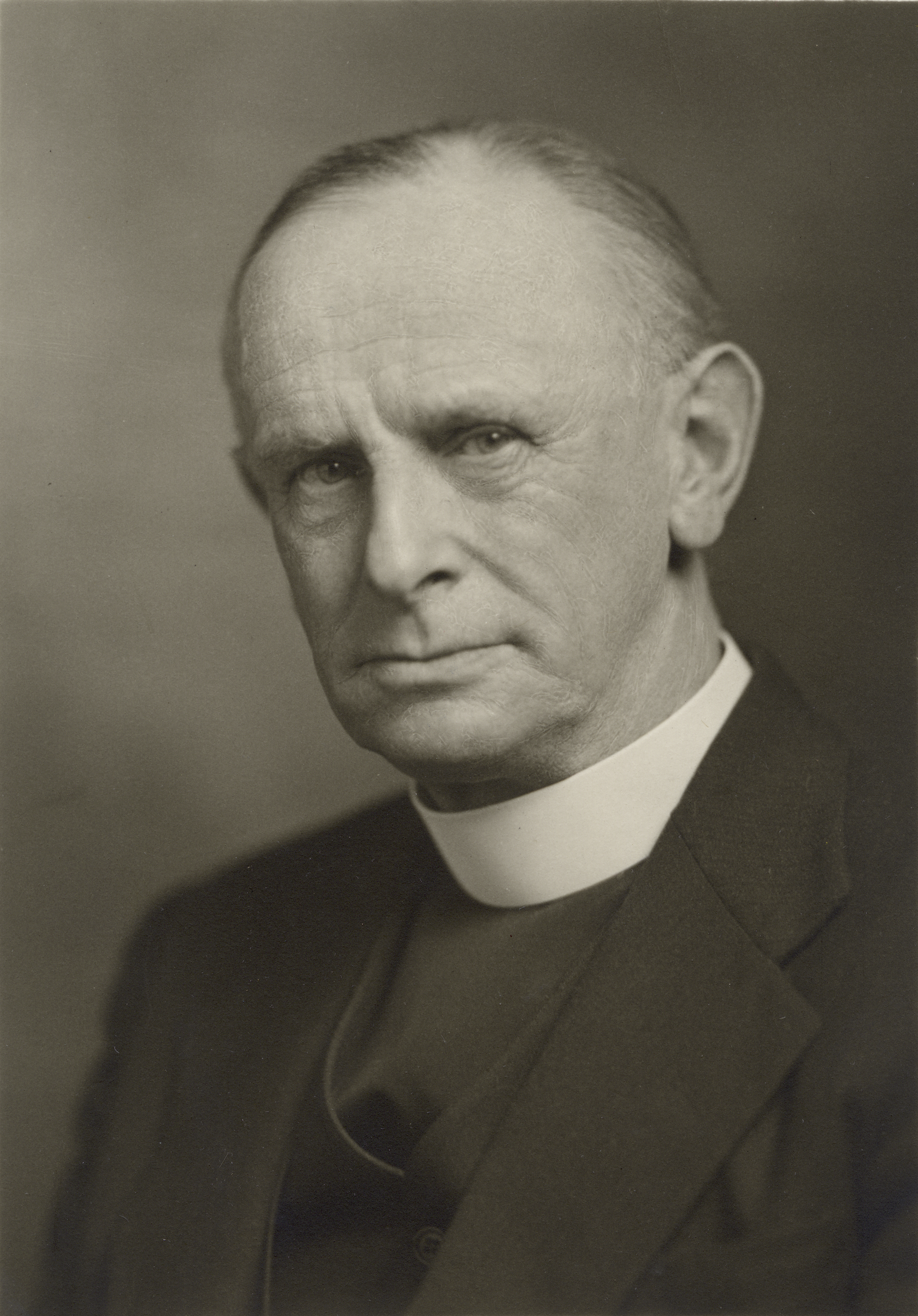
- Installed: 1942
- Term ended: 1944
- Predecessor: Aubrey S. Tuttle
- Successor: Jesse H. Arnup

Personal details
- Born: 9 April 1876 Manchester, England
- Died: 24 August 1949 (aged 73) Grantown-on-Spey, Scotland
- Spouse: Nora Christian Turnbull
- Profession: Minister
- Education: William Hulme's Grammar School; Manchester University; Emmanuel College, Cambridge; Westminster Theological College

John Robert Paterson Sclater (9 April 1876 – 24 August 1949) was a minister of the Presbyterian Church and the United Church of Canada who became the 10th Moderator of the United Church.

== Early life ==
John R.P. Sclater was born in Manchester, England to Rev. John Sclater, a Presbyterian missionary from Orkney who had just founded a new church in Whalley Range, and Ellen Paterson Sclater. The boy grew up in Manchester, and attended William Hulme's Grammar School. He attended Manchester University to earn a bachelor's degree, and then enrolled at Emmanuel College, Cambridge. During his time at Cambridge, he proved to be an all-around student, editing two University papers, serving as President of the Students' Union in 1899, and playing cricket and soccer. Sclater graduated from Emmanuel in 1900, earning his Master of Arts. Feeling called to ministry, he remained at Cambridge and attended the divinity school Westminster College, graduating with honours in philosophy in 1902, and earning his Doctor of Divinity (DD).

== Ministry: Great Britain ==
Following graduation, Sclater was ordained as a minister of the Presbyterian Church. His first post was at Greenhill Presbyterian Church in Derby, England. Five years later, he was called to the historic New North Free Church in Edinburgh. In decline at the turn of the 20th century, the church had been brought back to a new level of popularity by the previous minister, John Kelman, described as "one of the most eminent preachers of his generation." Sclater, at age 31, was filling big shoes, but succeeded admirably, becoming a celebrated liberal evangelical preacher. Sclater continued Kelman's ministry to university students, and also became a well-known figure in Edinburgh society during his 16-year tenure, becoming director of Merchant Company's Schools and the Edinburgh Royal Infirmary, and coaching the senior crew of the Edinburgh University Boat Club for ten years.

== Military chaplain ==
In 1909, Sclater became the chaplain of the 9th Royal Scots. Over the years, he delivered twelve addresses to the regiment, which were collected and published as The Eve of Battle in 1915. When the regiment was deployed to the Western Front, Sclater accompanied them into the trenches, and was twice Mentioned in Despatches. While in France, he met weekly with other chaplains to discuss the problems of preaching to soldiers who were enduring the hell of trench warfare. Sclater and Norman Maclean gathered these thoughts into a book, God and the Soldier, published in 1918.

== Ministry: Canada ==
After the war, Sclater returned to ministry at New North Free Church. In 1923, Sclater, now 47, left that post and moved to Toronto, where he became minister of Parkdale Presbyterian Church. He arrived at a momentous time for Protestant churches in Canada. The late 19th and early 20th century had seen a movement arise across Canada to amalgamate the Methodist, Presbyterian and Congregational churches, which came to fruition in 1925 with the formation of the United Church of Canada. Although the Methodists and Congregationalists joined en masse, each Presbyterian congregation was allowed to vote whether to join the new church union or to remain Presbyterian. Shortly after Sclater arrived in Toronto, his new congregation voted against union. As one obituary noted, "Once an ardent Presbyterian, Dr. Sclater saw the larger implications of Church Union." Another wrote, "He believed implicitly in the ultimate reunion of all Christian churches. 'In this rests the hope of the world', he said." Wanting to be a part of the new church union, Sclater stepped down as the minister of Parkdale in 1924, and was immediately called to Old St. Andrew's, a Presbyterian congregation that had voted to join the United Church. Sclater would remain the minister of Old St. Andrew's for the next 25 years, retiring only a few months before his death.

Sclater, who had demonstrated his abilities as a keen debater in university, became widely known as a powerful orator. Anglican bishop Robert Renison remarked "I believe he is one of the greatest preachers Canada has ever had and many a man has shamelessly stolen his sermons — after a decent interval — but they have never been the same as when preached by the old master." At various times, Sclater held the Warrack Lectureship of the Scottish Theological Colleges, the Lyman Beecher Lectureship at Yale University, and the Dudliean Lectureship at Harvard University. In addition, for many years he was the only non-American to serve on the Board of Preachers at Harvard. During the early years of World War II, Fifth Avenue Presbyterian Church in New York invited him on several occasions to become minister, but he turned down their offers, telling a reporter, "I feel I can do more for the Empire cause as a Britisher in Canada than I could in the United States."

== Moderator ==
In 1942, at the tenth General Council of the United Church, Sclater was elected to be Moderator of the church for a two-year term. It was the height of World War II, and in the spring of 1943, Sclater made the perilous journey to Great Britain to visit Canadian troops and chaplains. On 23 May 1943, Sclater preached at his old church, New North in Edinburgh.

Back in Canada, Sclater went on a tour of United churches in the north, in Western Canada and in the Maritimes. During this tour, he stated, "This is the most extraordinary time in which we live", and set out the four aims of the United Church during the war: To worship God, to teach the truth, to create a fellowship within itself and then extend that fellowship as far as possible, and to be the conscience of the state.

Sclater also took part in the beginning efforts to form a union of the United and Anglican churches in Canada, opening a personal and fruitful line of dialogue with Canadian Anglican archbishop Derwyn Owen. This resulted in a report to the church's General Council in which Sclater wrote, "it is agreed that the first step towards reunion should be the achievement of a mutually acceptable ministry."

At the end of his term as moderator in 1944, Sclater continued as minister of Old St. Andrew's for another four years, retiring in 1949 at the age of 73.

== Personal life ==
In 1904, Sclater married Nora Christian Turnbull, and they raised a daughter and two sons, one of whom predeceased him. In addition to being a superior cricket and soccer player, he also took up lacrosse in his 40s when he moved to Canada.

Following his retirement in 1949, Sclater and his wife travelled to Great Britain, where he visited his old grammar school in Whalley Range, and preached at several churches in Scotland. He also met with representatives of both the Church of England and Church of Scotland to discuss union between the two. On 24 August 1949, while staying in Grantown-on-Spey, Scotland, Sclater unexpectedly died.

== Honours ==
Sclater was awarded honorary Doctor of Divinity degrees by University of St Andrews and Queen's University, and he became the first member of the clergy to have an honorary Doctor of Laws (LLD) conferred on him by Victoria University, Toronto.

== Legacy ==
- "I don't think I have ever listened to one of his sermons that I didn't feel I had something to carry home with me." — Arthur Meighen, Canadian Prime Minister, 1920–21, 1926
- "For his courageous personality, for his ripe culture and broad experience, for his warm friendly brotherliness and his bubbling and refreshing humour we thank God who made him so and who gave him to us." — Willard E. Brewing, United Church Moderator, 1948–1950
- "Dr. Sclater was pre-eminently a beloved pastor, endeared to us by his charming peronality, his understanding of the lives and of the joys and sorrows of ordinary people, his great gift of sympathy, and his immediate response to every opportunity of giving help, guidance and comfort." — John Robertson

== Published works ==
- The Sons of Strength (1909)
- The Enterprise of Life (1911)
- The Eve of Battle (1915)
- God and the Soldier (with Norman Maclean, 1918)
- Modernist Fundamentalism (1926)
- The Public Worship of God (1927)

Religious titles
| Preceded by Aubrey S. Tuttle | Moderator of the United Church of Canada; 1942–1944 | Succeeded by Jesse H. Arnup |
