= T. Albert Moore =

5th Moderator of the United Church of Canada, 1882–1935

The Very Reverend T. Albert Moore DD, STD, LLD
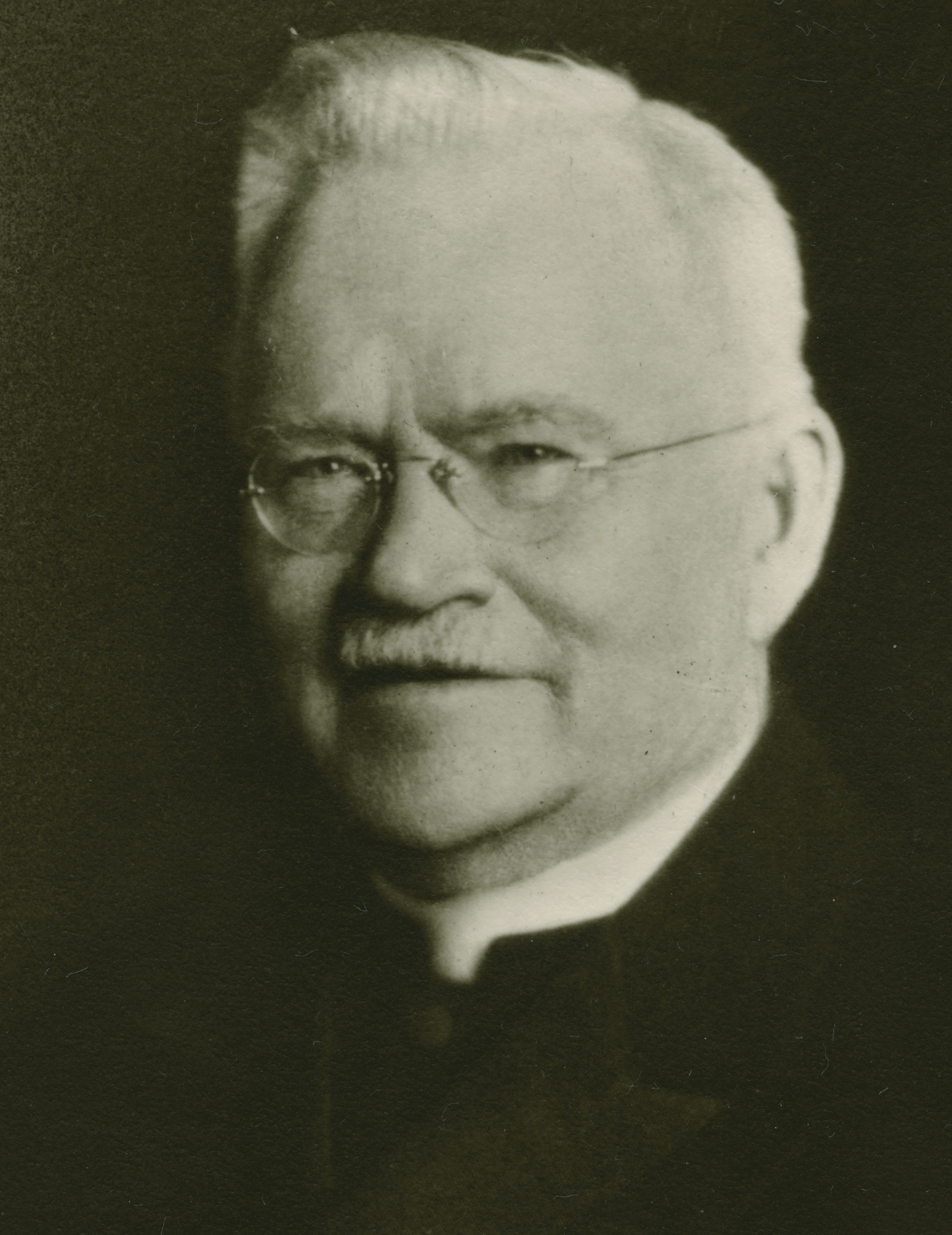

5th Moderator of the United Church of Canada
- In office 1932–1934
- Preceded by: Edmund H. Oliver
- Succeeded by: Richard Roberts

Personal details
- Born: 29 June 1860 Acton, Ontario
- Died: 31 March 1940 (age 79)
- Education: Wesleyan College
- Profession: Minister

Thomas Albert Moore (29 June 1860 – 31 March 1940) was a Canadian minister of the Methodist Church of Canada and the United Church of Canada. He started as a rural circuit rider and rose to become the General Secretary of both the Methodist Church and United Church, and then the 5th Moderator of the United Church.

== Early life ==
Moore was born in Acton, Ontario on 29 June 1860, and was raised in the nearby village of Rockwood, where he attended local schools until age 14.

== Newspaper ==
In 1874, at the age of 14, Moore began work at the newly founded Acton Free Press as an apprentice printer. In 1877, the newspaper's founder, Joseph H. Hacking, sold the business to Moore and reporter S.W. Galbraith in order to concentrate on his job printing business in nearby Guelph. When Galbraith left the following year to pursue his reporting career in Montreal, Moore formed a partnership with his older brother H.P. Moore as co-editors and co-publishers of the paper.

== Ordination ==
The Moore brothers were devout Methodists, and T. Albert increasingly felt called to ministry. In 1880, at the age of 20, he sold his share of the newspaper to his brother. H.P. Moore remained the editor and sole proprietor for many years, eventually becoming President of the Canadian Press Association. T. Albert applied to the London Conference of the Methodist Church of Canada and was accepted as a probationary candidate for ministry. He enrolled at Wesleyan College at McGill University in Montreal, and as part of his required field work, he become a junior circuit rider in 1882 under the supervision of Rev. W. H. Barraclough, visiting rural communities near London, Belmont, and Salford. In 1884, at the age of 24, he graduated with a Doctor of Divinity, was ordained, and married Mary Newton.

== Ministry ==
Over the next twenty years, Moore served as pastoral minister at various Methodist churches in southern Ontario including Drumbo, Princeton, Simcoe Street Methodist Church (Hamilton), Niagara Falls, Dunnville, Palmerston and Zion Tabernacle Methodist Church (Hamilton).

During this time, Moore gained a reputation for his evangelism, always seeking to bring new people into the church. He was also a believer in "moral reform", campaigning against issues such as legalized gambling at racetracks. As a teetotaller, Moore was against the sale and consumption of any alcohol; one biographer noted that he "hated the liquor trade with all his might, and never let a chance go by without striking at it." During two Ontario provincial elections where the question of Prohibition was a central issue, Moore served as the Campaign Secretary for the Ontario Temperance Federation.

Moore also was drawn to social justice issues, always looking to entwine Christianity with the betterment of social conditions. In the late 19th century, many Canadians had to work seven days a week. Moore campaigned and evangelized across Canada for Sunday-rest laws, promoting the idea that businesses should close on Sundays. This would not only give all workers at least one day off during the week, but Moore also believed that holding Sundays apart would bring Canada closer to his image of a Christian nation.

In addition to his strong evangelism, Moore was also recognized as an able and organized administrator, and served as Chairman of the Hamilton Conference of the Methodist church for five years before becoming President of the Conference.

== Executive ==
In 1903, Moore left pastoral ministry to become the Secretary of the Lord's Day Alliance in Ontario. In 1906, he was appointed Secretary of the General Conference of the Methodist Church in Canada, and in 1910 also took on the role of Secretary of the Board of Evangelism and Social Service. He also became editor of two important journals of the church, Methodist Discipline and Journal of the General Conference. In all of these roles, Moore frequently represented the Methodist Church of Canada at national and international conferences.

During World War I, Moore worked to raised relief funds for the citizens of Serbia. In 1918, the last year of the war, Moore was appointed head of the Methodist chaplains branch of the chaplaincy service, and travelled to London. As lead Methodist chaplain, Moore had several audiences with King George V. Following the war, Canadian Prime Minister Robert Borden chose Moore to assist with the demobilization of Canadian soldiers.

== Union ==
The late 19th and early 20th century saw a movement arise across Canada to amalgamate all of the Reformed Christian denominations in Canada (Methodists, Presbyterians and Congregationalists). As a pastoral minister, Moore was at first not drawn to Union. But in his Executive roles in the Methodist church, he grew more comfortable with the idea, and in 1915 became the secretary of the Methodist committee on church union, and the secretary of the joint Methodist/Presbyterian/Congregationalist union committee. The Toronto Star later wrote of this period, "In counsel he was moderate and diplomatic and a reconciler of antagonistic opinions."

In 1925, when the United Church of Canada was inaugurated, Moore became Secretary of the General Council of the new church. In that role, Moore represented the new Church of Canada at many important conferences and meetings. Canadian Press claimed that Dr. Moore "represented his church on probably more international and interdenominational bodies than any other Canadian churchman."

== Moderator ==
In 1932, at the fifth General Council of the United Church in Hamilton, Moore was elected to be Moderator of the church for a two-year term. At the end of his term, Moore continued as Secretary of the General Conference for another two years.

== Retirement and death ==
When Moore retired in 1936 at the seventh General Council, the delegates passed a motion that read in part, "The Church loses an energetic and efficient official, a wise administrator, an outstanding preacher of the Christian gospel, and an ecclesiastical statesman of tolerant spirit and broad vision." The Christian Century noted, "The Spirit gives to some gifts of administration but to very few in such abundant measure as to Dr. Moore."

Moore, now in his late 70s but still filled with vigour, continued to travel across Canada, preaching and evangelizing for moral and social reform. (The Toronto Star noted, "He could not be happy in idleness.") On one such trip to the Maritimes in September 1938, Moore suffered a serious heart attack in St. John, New Brunswick. Although Moore slowly recovered, his health remained frail, and 18 months later, on 31 March 1940, he died in his sleep at the age of 79. Honorary pallbearers at his funeral included Chief Justice Lyman Duff, former Prime Minister Arthur Meighen, and Canadian Catholic Archbishop Derwyn Owen.

The Canadian Press noted, "Though fearless and outspoken on questions of social and moral reform, Dr. Moore had a capacity for tact and a grace of humor which carried him far in the discussions with cabinets and tribunals." United Church Observer wrote "At the time of the [Church] Union he was elected Secretary of General Council and did much in the following years as an administrator to guide the destinies of The United Church." Moore's successor to the role of Secretary, Gordon A. Sisco, wrote, "He was more than a detached executive officer. He was guide, philosopher and friend to ministers and laymen throughout the whole connexion. They looked to him for advice and direction on a great variety of problems ... During the critical and formative time just after Church Union, he did much to shape and fashion the whole legal and administrative structuire of our Church's life." H.H. Bingham, President of the Baptist Convention of Ontario and Quebec, called him "a preacher with a primitive passion for the souls of men. In later years, although serving the church in an executive capacity, he never lost the fervour of the evangelist."

Moore was interred in Acton, the town where he had been born.

== Personal life ==
Moore married Mary Newton in 1884, with whom he had three children. Their son, Harry, became a war correspondent during World War I, then a soldier in the trenches, a newspaper editor, and a correspondent in Paris and Philadelphia, dying two years before his father. Moore's first wife Mary died in 1896, and the following year he married Annie Forster, with whom he had two daughters.

== Honours ==
- In 1919, Serbian Prince Regent Alexander Karađorđević awarded Moore the Order of the Red Cross for his efforts to raise war relief funds for the people of Serbia during World War I.
- In 1934, the University of Syracuse conferred a Doctor of Sacred Theology (S.T.D.) on Moore.
- In the same year, Mount Allison University conferred a Doctor of Law (LL.D.) on Moore.
- In addition to the Doctor of Divinity that Moore earned from Wesleyan College before his ordination, six other universities conferred a D.D. upon him.

Religious titles
Preceded by Edmund H. Oliver	Moderator of the United Church of Canada; 1930–1932	Succeeded by Richard Roberts
