= John W. Woodside =

8th Moderator of the United Church of Canada, 1881–1957

The Very Reverend John W. Woodside
- Moderator of the United Church of Canada
- Installed: 1938
- Term ended: 1940
- Predecessor: Peter Bryce
- Successor: Aubrey S. Tuttle

Orders
- Ordination: by Montreal Presbytery, Presbyterian Church of Canada, 1907

Personal details
- Born: 26 April 1881 Saint-Sylvestre, Quebec
- Died: 9 January 1957 (aged 75) Ottawa
- Spouse: Lulu Marion Currie
- Children: Murray Woodside; Marion Currie
- Profession: Minister
- Education: University of Manitoba; The Presbyterian College, Montreal

John William Woodside (26 April 1881 – 9 January 1957) was a minister of the Presbyterian Church of Canada and the United Church of Canada who became the 8th Moderator of the United Church.

== Early life ==
John W. Woodside was born in St. Sylvestre West, Quebec to Alexander Woodside and Isabella McKee, immigrants from Northern Ireland. Shortly after his birth, the family moved to Manitoba, where Woodside attended school. He entered University of Manitoba in 1900 and earned his Bachelor of Arts in 1904. Feeling called to ministry, Woodside enrolled in the divinity program at The Presbyterian College, Montreal, and graduated with his Master of Arts in 1907.

== Ministry: Presbyterian Church ==
Following graduation, Woodside was ordained by the Montreal Presbytery of the Canadian Presbysterian Church, and served as assistant minister at St. James Presbyterian Church in Montreal for five months. He then moved to Mount Pleasant Church in Vancouver in 1908, and by 1914, was Chair of New Westminster Presbytery. That same year, Woodside moved to Chalmers Presbyterian Church in Toronto where "he at once became a prominent figure in the Toronto Presbytery, and the friend of many clergymen of other denominations, owing to his broad and progressive outlook on problems of the day."

In 1918, Woodside accepted a call to be the minister of the identically named Chalmers Presbyterian Church in Ottawa, where he remained until 1949.

== The United Church of Canada ==
The late 19th and early 20th century saw a movement arise across Canada to amalgamate all of the Reformed Christian denominations in Canada (Methodists, Presbyterians and Congregationalists). During Woodside's time in British Columbia, he became convinced that the Christian message would be better heard in newly developed areas of the country if delivered by a single voice of an almagamated church. Despite opposition to amalgamation from friends and fellow Presbyterian ministers, Woodside became one of the most prominent proponents of church union, and helped it reach fruition in June 1925 with the formation of the United Church of Canada. Although the Methodist and Congregational churches amalgamated as a whole, each of the 4,397 Presbysterian congregations in Canada voted whether or not to join the new church, and Woodside took on the role of organizing the vote. Woodside's own congregation voted 77% to join (651 ayes versus 197 nays). The congregation then changed its name to Chalmers United. Natalie Anderson Rathwell noted that "An influx of members from [Presbyterian churches in Ottawa] that had not voted for union made Chalmers a very strong and influential congregation within the United Church."

Since Chalmers United was located in downtown Ottawa, several prominent Canadian politicians were members of Woodside's congregation, including R. B. Bennett, Prime Minister of Canada from 1930–1935.

== Moderator ==
In 1938, at the eighth General Council of the United Church, Woodside was elected to be Moderator of the church for a two-year term. Hector Charlesworth noted at the time, "They chose a man who knew his country well through personal contact with many of its sections and for years had been an outstanding figure in the life of the nation's capital ... In the best sense of the word he is a social figure, with a friendly greeting for the countless people who meet him in his comings and goings."

Three months after Canada entered World War II, Woodside published a Christmas message of hope, writing, "Christmas and good will are forever joined together. The tremendous release of kindly senitment is a bright spot on the horizon ... The final triumph of good will is certain not only because it is native to the human heart but because God himself is good will."

After stepping down as moderator in 1940, Woodside continued to minister at Chalmers United, and also served as president of the Western Section of the World Alliance of Reformed Churches in 1947.

Woodside retired from ministry in 1949 at the age of 68. Over the next two years, he served as president of the Canadian Council of Churches.

== Personal life ==
In 1912, Woodside married Lula Marion Currie (daughter of William Currie, a member of the Legislative Assembly of New Brunswick), and they raised two children, Murray and Marion. Woodside enjoyed a number of hobbies, including fishing, curling and golf.

Woodside died on 9 January 1957, aged 75.

== Honours ==
- In 1926, The Presbyterian College in Montreal granted Woodside the degree of Doctor of Divinity (D.D.).
- In 1939, Victoria College granted him the degree of Doctor of Divinity.
- In 1940, Mount Allison University conferred on Woodside the degree of Doctor of Laws (LL.D.).

== Legacy ==
Speaking at Woodside's funeral, the moderator of the time, James S. Thomson eulogized, "He moved among us a towering figure, alive in body and spirit, a valiant leader, a wise counsellor, a mighty preacher, a beloved pastor. The Church called him to its highest office. He was honoured by all the churches in this land by his election to be President of the Canadian Council of Churches. To the welfare of all the Reformed Churches of the World he contributed the encouragement of his presence and the zeal of his devotion in their ecumenical assemblies."

Religious titles
Preceded by Peter Bryce	Moderator of the United Church of Canada; 1938–1940	Succeeded by Aubrey S. Tuttle
