= Richard Roberts (minister) =

6th Moderator of the United Church of Canada, 1882–1935

The Very Reverend Richard Roberts BD
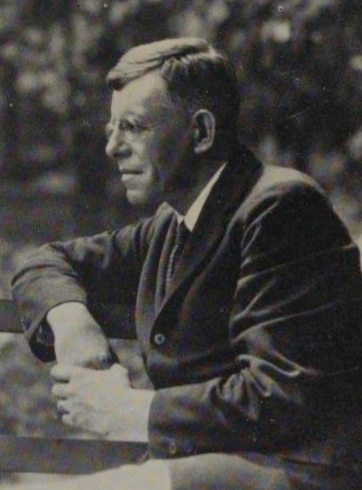

6th Moderator of the United Church of Canada
- In office 1934–1936
- Preceded by: T. Albert Moore
- Succeeded by: Peter Bryce

Personal details
- Born: 31 May 1874 Blaenau Ffestiniog, Wales
- Died: 10 April 1945 (aged 70) Brooklyn NY
- Spouse: Anne Catherine Thomas
- Children: Dorothy, Margaret, Gwen
- Education: University College of Wales
- Profession: Minister

Richard Roberts (31 May 1874 – 10 April 1945) was a minister of the Calvinist Methodist Church in Wales, the Presbyterian Church in England, and the United Church of Canada. He rose to prominence in the United Kingdom during the First World War when he openly declared his belief in pacifism during the opening days of World War I. He moved to United States, and thence to Canada, becoming a minister in the newly formed United Church, and eventually became the 6th Moderator of the United Church, as well as a leading theologian of the time.

== Early life ==
Richard Roberts was born in 1874 in Blaenau Ffestiniog in northern Wales, the son of a minister in the Welsh Calvinistic Methodist Church who was a former slate quarry worker. While attending high school at Liverpool Institute, young Richard was not drawn to religious life at first, and instead went on to study science at University College of Wales in Aberystwyth. Although he completed a degree in science, his poor eyesight hindered his ability to do dissections, and he switched to theological studies at Bala-Bangor Theological Seminary in 1894, earning his Bachelor of Divinity two years later.

== Ministry ==
Following his graduation, Roberts joined the Calvinist Methodist Church's Forward Movement, preaching a social justice gospel in the coal fields and seaports in southern Wales. He was ordained in 1897.

In 1900, Roberts accepted a call to be the minister of Willesden Green Welsh Church in London. There he met a Welsh woman, Anne Catherine Thomas, and they married in 1901. Two years later, Roberts transferred to the Presbyterian Church and became minister at St. Paul's Church, Westbourne Grove, London.

In 1910, Roberts accepted a call to be the minister of the Crouch Hill Presbyterian Church near Banbury.

== Founding of the Fellowship of Reconciliation ==
On the morning of 9 August 1914, the first Sunday after England entered World War I, Roberts mounted the steps to his London pulpit and noticed that several young German men who had regularly attended services were absent. He later wrote "I had a shattering intuition that perhaps my boys, the British and the German, might meet on some battlefield in Europe, where it would be their business to kill one another!" Roberts later wrote, "I knew when I left the church that morning that as a minister of Christ I could take no part in a war."

Roberts immediately met with some like-minded people, including Henry Hodgkin, William E. Orchard, Edwyn Bevan, George Bell (later Bishop of Chichester) and William Temple (later Archbishop of York and Archbishop of Canterbury). The group quickly started to published a series of Papers for Wartime. In December 1914, with the help of Quaker Lucy Gardner, Roberts and a small group conceived the Fellowship of Reconciliation (FOR). Despite the unpopularity of pacifism, Roberts continued to espouse his beliefs from his pulpit. Increased friction with his congregation over his views led to his resignation in July 1915, and he became editor of a monthly journal, The Venturer.

== North America ==
In 1916, Roberts crossed the Atlantic to take up ministry at Church of the Pilgrims in Brooklyn, New York, working part-time at the church while he founded a chapter of the FOR in North America, joining Reinhold Niebuhr and Kirby Page on the editorial board of The World Tomorrow. He acted as a liaison between British and American pacifists throughout the war.

In 1921, Roberts moved to Montreal to become the minister of the American Presbyterian Church.

== The United Church of Canada ==
The late 19th and early 20th century saw a movement arise across Canada to amalgamate all of the Reformed Christian denominations in Canada (Methodists, Presbyterians and Congregationalists). This reached fruition in June 1925 with the formation of the United Church of Canada. The first action of the first General Council following the signing of the new church's Basis of Union was to accept Roberts into the United Church.

Roberts started to delve more deeply into the theology of pacifism and in 1926 he wrote The Christian and War, which was called "the definitive Canadian pacificist statement of the period."

In 1927, Roberts accepted a call to be the minister of Sherbourne Street United Church in Toronto, a former Methodist church called "the millionaires' church" because it was in Toronto's most prestigious neighbourhood among the mansions of the rich and powerful. Despite this, Roberts' time here was marked by his evangelism, and his calls for social service and economic justice.

Roberts became very active in the new United Church administration. As a member of the national Church Worship and Ritual Committee, Roberts was thrust into the centre of the United Church's first controversy, the production of a denominational hymn book. One of the issues was the matter who would print the new hymnary. Oxford University Press, (OUP) who had previously printed two editions of the Presbyterian Book of Praise, and holders of the copyright to all the Presbyterian hymns, had assumed they would be printing the new hymnary. But the new United Church had inherited the Methodists' very substantial printing enterprise, and through their newly formed United Church Publishing House, planned to print the new hymnary themselves. OUP was not happy at the loss of this substantial job and refused to release the copyright on the Presbyterian hymns. The church's Board of Publication dug their heels in and refused to negotiate, proposing to publish the new hymnary without any Oxford hymns. The chair of the Board of Publication was a member of Roberts' congregation, and Roberts sat down with him to convince him to negotiate with Oxford. Roberts became part of the negotiating team that eventually settled on a compromise copyright solution.

In the early 1930s, Roberts drafted the United Church of Canada's endorsement of the World Disarmament Conference.

== Moderator ==
In 1934, at the sixth General Council of the United Church, Roberts was elected to be Moderator of the church for a two-year term. By this time, Roberts was becoming concerned that the first decade of the new national church had been preoccupied with setting up the structure and method of the church, but there was no sign this was abating; Roberts believed it was time to attend to the church's "spiritual offices." Roberts spent much of his time as Moderator travelling across the country, organizing spiritual retreats and meeting with as many people of the church as possible from ministers and church executives to children.

At the end of his term, Roberts was not convinced that a corner had been turned, and warned that any church that cared less about its purpose than its organization was "sick unto death ... [if that church] forgets or becomes indifferent to its worship, to the preaching of the Word, to it Sacraments and its devotional life, to its missionary calling, the writing is on the wall." As David B. Marshall wrote, "His concern about the decline of religion in modern society caused him to become one of the trenchant of critics of contemporary Protestantism. Roberts thought that the church's 'confusion about its business in the world', and moreover, its uncertain gospel paralysed it."

In his closing address to the General Council, Roberts also warned that another war, even more world-spanning that the Great War, was inevitable, and urged the church to be the first to step forward and declare that it would "lend no countenance whatever to the furtherance of any future wars ... gravely fear for the future of the church if it suffers this enormity to overtake the world without raising its voice in forthright repudiation of it before it happened."

== Retirement and death ==
In 1938, Roberts stepped down as minister of Sherbourne United, but continued to travel, explore theology and evangelize. In 1939, as war enveloped the world again, Roberts was one of 75 people to sign the public document "Witness Against War." Although the attorney general of Ontario threatened prosecution, in the end, the United Church offered a statement that sought to find a compromise between the pacifist signatories and those within the church that supported the war, a statement Roberts called "feeble and cowardly."

In 1940, Roberts moved to the United States to preach and lead pacifism retreats. He also addressed student conferences in both United States and Canada. In 1944, his health began to fail and he died in Brooklyn on 10 April 1945, less than a month before the end of the war in Europe. His ashes were scattered on a Welsh mountain near his birthplace.

== Personal life ==
Roberts and his wife Anne raised three daughters.

== Legacy ==
Harold Josephson called him "one of the most influential pacifists in Canada during the interwar years."

Religious titles
Preceded by T. Albert Moore	Moderator of the United Church of Canada; 1934–1936	Succeeded by Peter Bryce
