= Aubrey S. Tuttle =

8th Moderator of the United Church of Canada, 1881–1957

The Very Reverend Aubrey S. Tuttle DD, LLD
- Moderator of the United Church of Canada
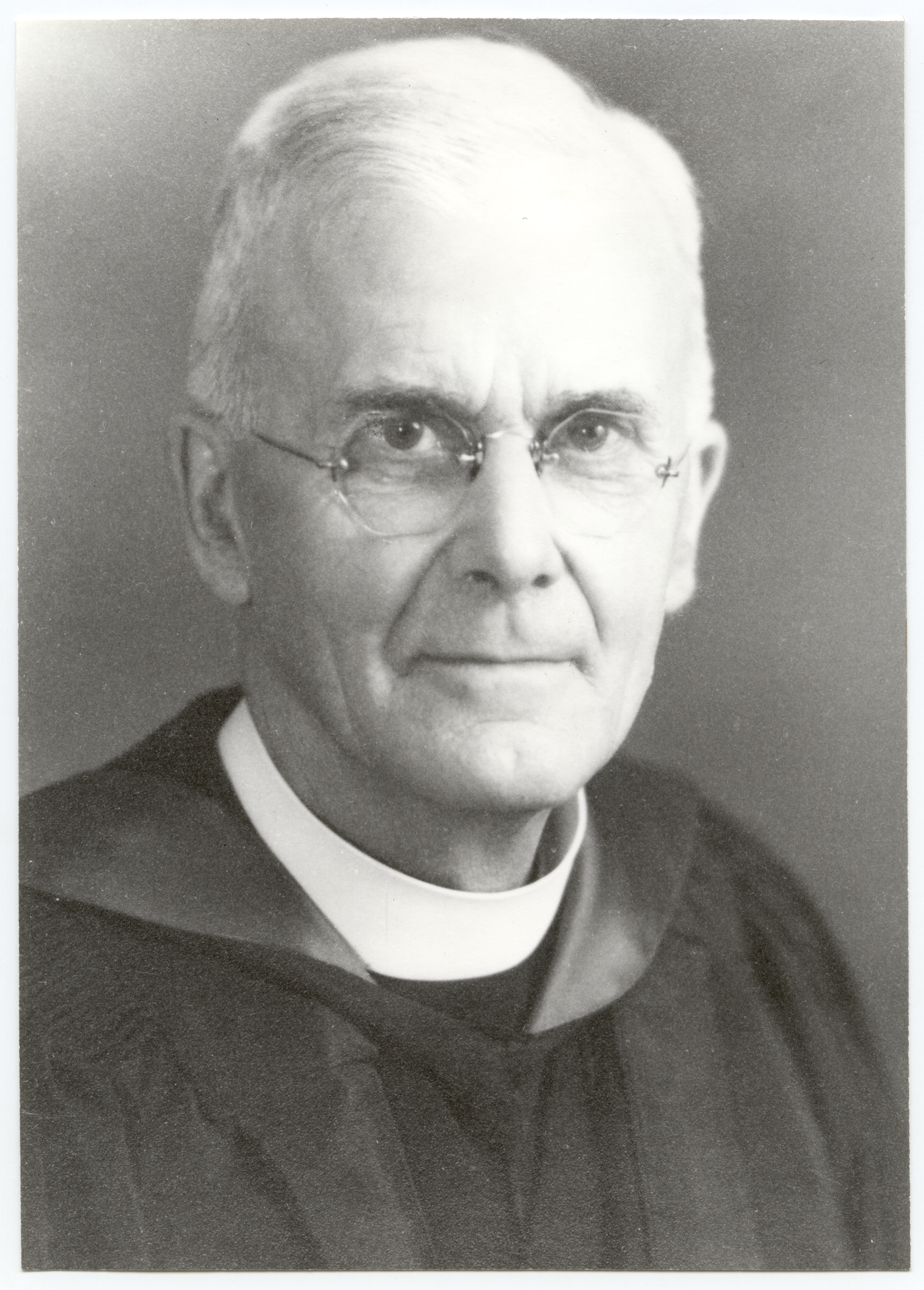
- Installed: 1940
- Term ended: 1942
- Predecessor: John W. Woodside
- Successor: John R.P. Sclater

Personal details
- Born: 2 October 1874 Pugwash, Nova Scotia
- Died: 20 October 1949 (aged 75) Victoria BC
- Spouse: Mary Anna Johnson
- Children: Morley; Julie; Aubrey Jr.; George; Ruth
- Profession: Minister
- Education: Mount Allison University

Aubrey Stephen Tuttle (2 October 1874 – 20 October 1949) was a minister of the Methodist Church of Canada and then the United Church of Canada who became the 9th Moderator of the United Church.

== Early life ==
Tuttle was born on a farm near Pugwash, Nova Scotia, the fourth of five children of Peter Milldige Tuttle and Julia Ann Fulton. On his father’s side, Tuttle was descended from a United Empire Loyalist who had been forced to leave Albany, New York during the American War of Independence. On his mother’s side, Tuttle counted among his ancestors William Black, the founder of the Methodist Church in the Canadian Maritimes; Adam George Archibald, one of the Fathers of Confederation, and his maternal grandfather Stephen Fulton, who had served in the cabinet of the Nova Scotia House of Assembly. Tuttle's mother was a deeply religious woman whose conviction in God’s providence inspired her son. When she died suddenly at the age of 48, Tuttle was forced to leave high school and find a job to help support the family.

== Ministry ==
In 1897, at age 23, Tuttle presented himself to the Methodist Church as a candidate for ministry. This created a problem for the church because Tuttle lacked a high school diploma, necessary for enrolment in divinity school. As a result, Tuttle enrolled in Horton Academy, a Baptist residential school for boys, and earned his diploma. When he enrolled at Mount Allison University, the administration allowed him to bypass the normal prerequisites of math and sciences, instead substituting literature, history, philosophy and psychology. Tuttle performed well academically, and also spent some of his time as a student missionary in outlying communities, as was usual for ministry students of the time.

He graduated with his Master of Arts in 1903, was ordained as a minister, and was settled in a church in Truro. Two years later, Tuttle received a letter from a minister in Edmonton, Alberta, then a burgeoning pioneer town, who was looking for ministers to found new churches.

Tuttle agreed to move to Edmonton, and subsequently founded Grace Church, holding services under a tent until a building could be erected. Shortly afterwards, Tuttle was appointed to Wesley Church in Calgary, another new church in need of a building.

From there, Tuttle moved to Medicine Hat to minister at Fifth Avenue Church. In his travels, Tuttle had met a number of men like himself, who felt called to ministry but lacked the necessary educational background. To help these men, Tuttle began to map out a program of self-directed graduate studies.

This came to the attention of several Methodist church leaders in Alberta, and when he moved to McDougall Church in Edmonton in 1917, he was approached to take on the role of Principal of Alberta College South, the Methodist school of divinity at the University of Alberta. Tuttle accepted this appointment in 1919.

== The United Church of Canada ==
The late 19th and early 20th century saw a movement arise across Canada to amalgamate all of the Reformed Christian denominations in Canada (Methodists, Presbyterians and Congregationalists). This came to fruition in 1925 with the formation of the United Church of Canada. Alberta College South and Robertson College, the Methodist and Presbyterian divinity schools at University of Alberta, were merged to form St. Stephen's College; Tuttle, the principal of the Methodist school, and Dr. J.M. Millar, the principal of the Presbyterian school, shared the role of joint principal until Millar's death in 1930.

Tuttle also served important roles within the new United Church, including President of the Alberta Conference in 1932.

== Moderator ==
In 1940, at the ninth General Council of the United Church held in Winnipeg, Tuttle was elected to be Moderator of the church for a two-year term. World War II was raging in Europe, and as Tuttle took office, the news was grim – France had capitulated to Germany, the British army had been rescued from Dieppe, leaving all their equipment behind, and it was the height of the Luftwaffe's Blitz. Speaking after his election, Tuttle said, "It would be foolish to minimize the dark dangers of the present time, but on the other hand, it would be just as foolish to be overly pessimistic. The present conflict strikes at the roots of Christianity and of civilization. We of the church must dedicate ourselves to that high purpose."

Tuttle quickly put out the call to members of the United Church to buy Victory Bonds, writing, "It enables us to express our loyalty to our country, our devotion to our Church and our desire to preserve for future generations the priceless possession of civil and religious liberties ... Remember, if the forces of evil triumph it means the end of all we hold dear."

Another issue Tuttle raised was a shortage of ministers in Western Canada due to what he believed were financial barriers, pointing out "When church union came [in 1925], we had 200 ministers to spare, but they were quickly absorbed. Now there are western fields without men. In Saskatchewan there are 25 young men anxious to study for the ministry but without the means to take their college courses."

== Retirement ==
Tuttle stepped down as moderator in 1942, and retired as principal of St. Stephen's College the following year. He and his wife then moved to Victoria BC, where Tuttle died on 20 October 1949, aged 75.

== Personal life ==
In 1910, during his period of church-building in Alberta, Tuttle returned briefly to Nova Scotia to marry Mary Anna Johnson, a teacher at Mount Allison Ladies College whom he had know from childhood. They raised five children: Morley, Julie, Aubrey Jr., George (who would become a United Church minister and also be elected moderator), and Ruth (who died in infancy).

== Honours ==
- In 1920, Mount Allison University conferred on Tuttle the honorary degree of Doctor of Divinity (DD).
- In 1936, he received the honorary degree of Doctor of Laws (LLD) from the University of Alberta.

Religious titles
Preceded by John W. Woodside	Moderator of the United Church of Canada; 1940–1942	Succeeded by John R.P. Sclater
