= Edmund H. Oliver =

4th Moderator of the United Church of Canada

The Very Reverend Edmund H. Oliver FRSC
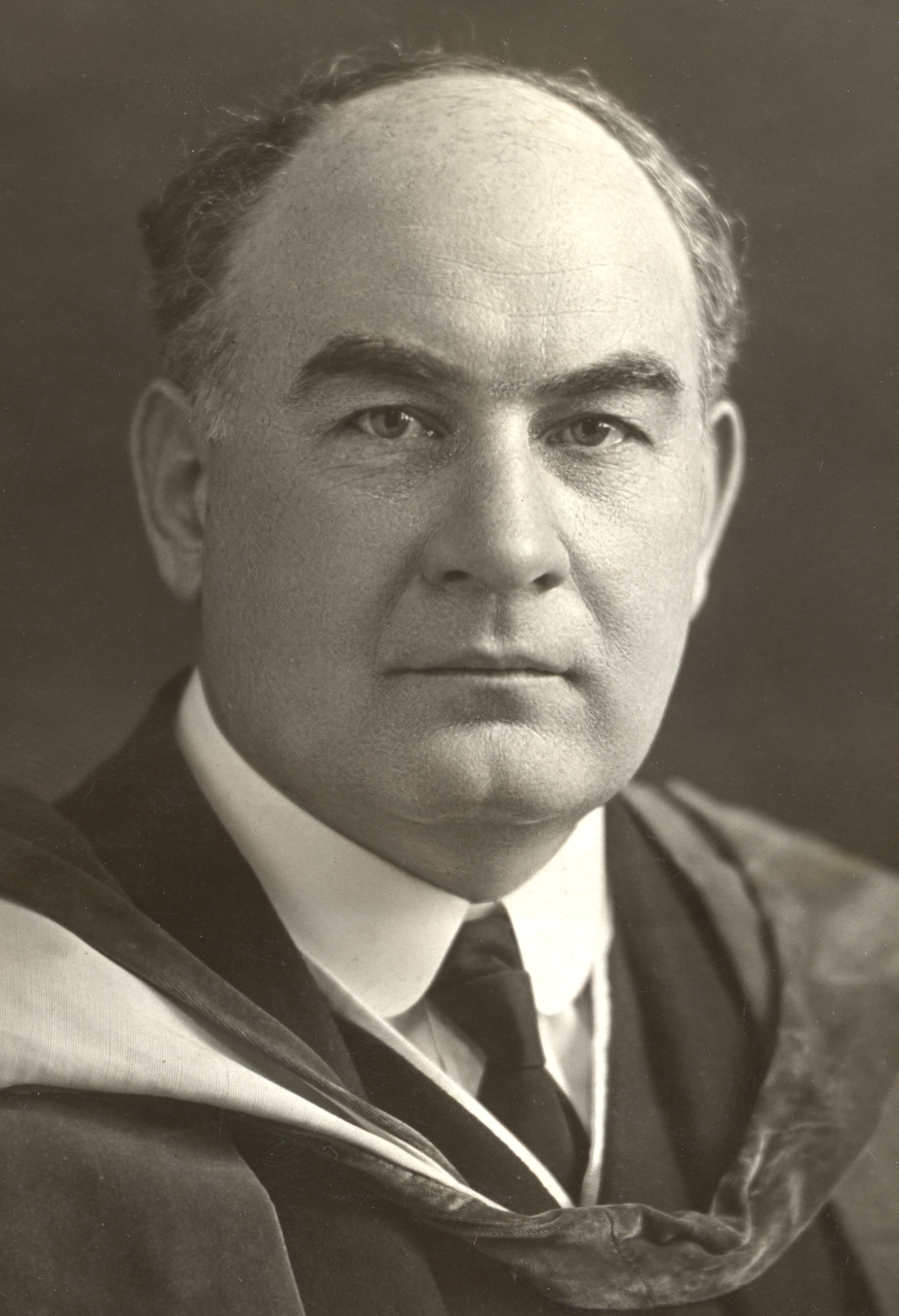

4th Moderator of the United Church of Canada
- In office 1930–1932
- Preceded by: William T. Gunn
- Succeeded by: T. Albert Moore

Personal details
- Born: February 8, 1882 Eberts, Ontario
- Died: July 11, 1935 (aged 53)
- Education: University of Toronto; Columbia University; Knox College, Toronto
- Profession: Minister; Professor

Edmund Henry Oliver FRSC (1882–1935) was a Canadian minister of the Presbyterian Church of Canada and the United Church of Canada, a chaplain and an educator. He played an integral role in the founding of St. Andrew's College, Saskatoon in 1912 – then known as the Presbyterian Theological College – and served as its first president. Oliver also served as the 4th Moderator of the United Church of Canada.

== Early life and education ==
Oliver was born in Eberts, Ontario in 1882. He attended a primary country school, then entered Chatham Collegiate Institute in 1893, age 11. He excelled academically, winning prizes every year as first in his class. Before graduating in 1898, he led the entire province of Ontario in classics and mathematics, winning several scholarships and a gold medal for scholastic achievement.

Oliver enrolled in the University of Toronto and received his Bachelor of Arts in 1902, winning the McCaul Gold Medal in classics. He was immediately appointed instructor in Greek, and an Alexander Mackenzie Fellow in political science, while earning his Master's degree at the same time.

Oliver moved to New York to enrol at Columbia University, where he earned both a scholarship and a Ph.D. in 1905 for his thesis "Roman Economic Conditions in the Republic".

== Academic ==
Oliver moved back to Toronto, where from 1906 to 1909, he was the head of the History department at McMaster University (then located in Toronto). He spent summers travelling to missions in Alberta and British Columbia, and to Berlin for further studies. In 1909 Oliver moved to Saskatoon, Saskatchewan upon the request of Dr. Walter Murray and helped establish the University of Saskatchewan, taking up the post of professor of economics and history. Oliver returned to Toronto in 1910 to earn a Doctor of Divinity degree before returning to the University of Saskatchewan, where he helped to found the Presbyterian Theological College — now St. Andrew's College. He was appointed in 1913 by the Presbyterian General Assembly of Canada to serve as the first principal of the new college. Oliver was deeply committed to the integration of theological education into the broader academic environment and post-secondary community. Under his leadership, the new college began plans to build and move into a new location right on the campus of the University of Saskatchewan.

== Chaplain ==
At the outbreak of the First World War, Oliver enlisted as a military chaplain. Stationed mainly in France, he continued to be a proponent of education, establishing reading rooms for soldiers who were on leave, and riding his bicycle out to the front lines in order to provide books and classes to the infantry. He was the founder of the University of Vimy Ridge (also known as "Khaki University"). Oliver believed that this would allow those who survived to return to Canada and be leaders in their communities and society.

== Moderator ==
After the war, Oliver continued his work in theological education and became involved in the church union movement that proposed a union between the Presbyterian, Methodist and Congregational churches. Oliver, along with George C. Pidgeon, worked to try to convince the anti-Union wing of the Presbyterian church that this was an important and necessary step.

Oliver was greatly influenced by the social gospel movement and served on two Royal Commissions: one to establish farming co-operatives and credit systems, and the other to create a liquor control board. He was named a fellow of the Royal Society of Canada in 1921.

Following the formation of the United Church of Canada in 1925, Oliver remained an important voice in the new church, and in 1930, at the 4th General Conference of the church in London, Ontario, he was elected to be the 4th Moderator, a role he served from 1930–1932.

Oliver saw his life work as one of service on the new frontiers of Canada, and during his time as Moderator, he lived into that, travelling across the country during The Great Depression, urging people to donate clothing and food to those who needed it.

== Death ==
Only three years after his term as Moderator ended, Oliver died at the age of 53 while working with youth at a summer camp.

Religious titles
Preceded by William T. Gunn	Moderator of the United Church of Canada; 1930–1932	Succeeded by T. Albert Moore
