= Peter Bryce (clergyman) =

The Very Reverend Peter Bryce DD, LLD
- 7th Moderator of the United Church of Canada
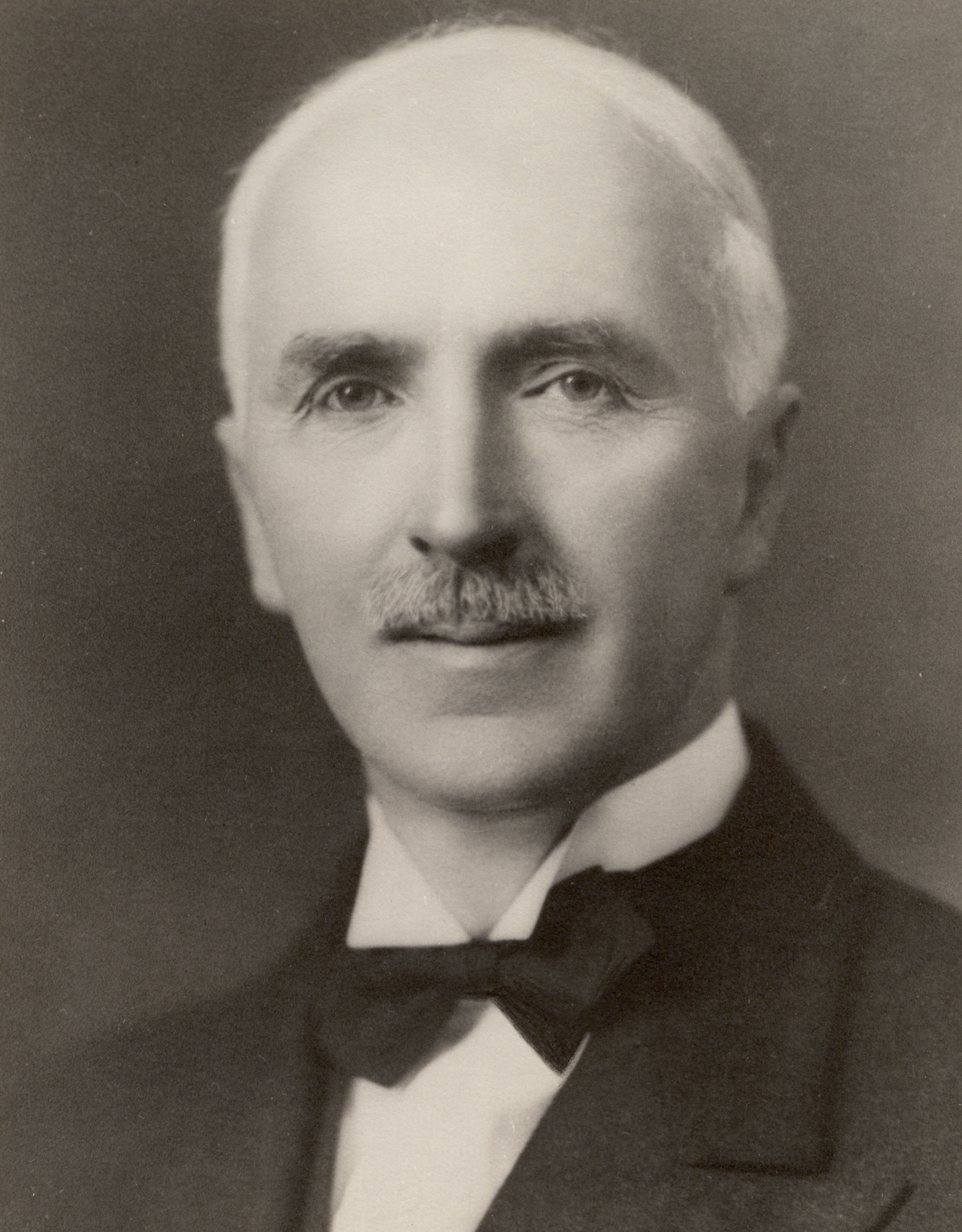
- Church: United Church of Canada
- In office: 1936-1938
- Predecessor: Richard Roberts
- Successor: John W. Woodside

Orders
- Ordination: 1908

Personal details
- Born: December 31, 1878 Blantyre, Scotland
- Died: November 30, 1950 (aged 71) Toronto, Ontario
- Spouse: Julia Bemister Woods
- Children: John Bemister; Douglas Bryce
- Profession: Minister
- Education: Victoria College

Peter Bryce (December 31, 1878 - November 30, 1950) was a minister in the British and Canadian Methodist Churches and in the United Church of Canada, where he became the seventh Moderator in 1936.

== Early life ==
Peter Bryce was born in Blantyre, Scotland on 31 December 1878, and was raised in a strict conservative Presbyterian household. But Bryce became inspired by the writings and ministry of John Wesley, writing, "What impressed me about John Wesley, though, was the power with which he preached the gospel. This great evangelist preached day and night, even on street corners, established orphanages where there were none, opened dispensaries for the poor, urged that the luxuries of the rich be taxed instead of the poor, gave money to the poor 20 shillings at a time, and made, in his will, provisions that his pallbearers be six unemployed men to be paid one pound." This led Bryce to join the Methodist Church with the aim of becoming a minister.

== Ministry ==
Bryce was accepted by the Methodist Church as a candidate for ministry, and as was common for potential Methodist ministers of the time, he became an evangelist and circuit rider, travelling throughout England and Scotland. In 1903, Bryce was sent to Newfoundland (then a British colony, not a part of the Canadian confederation) as part of his probationary work, working in Bay of Islands.

All of his evangelistic work convinced Bryce to formalize his calling, and in 1906, he entered Victoria College as a divinity student.

While he was a student, Bryce became a student missionary, ministering to the thousands of recent British immigrants in the squatters' settlements of the Earlscourt district. After being conferred with a Doctor of Divinity in 1908, he was ordained as a Canadian Methodist minister. He continued his work in Earlscourt, overseeing the building of seven new churches. At one time, the Earlscourt Central church had the largest Sunday School in Canada. He also founded the Earlscourt Children's Home.

His work with the poor and disadvantaged of the area became the foundation of Bryce's ministry and over the next fifteen years, he advocated for numerous marginalized groups within Toronto and nationwide. He had a part in the establishment of workers' compensation, Mothers Allowances, old age pensions, family allowances, Employment Insurance, juvenile and family courts, the legal adoption of orphans, and the Ontario Community Welfare Association. He advocated for a 40-hour work week, chaired the Mothers' Allowance Board until 1927 and was president of the Child Welfare Council. In 1918, he became the first President of Toronto's Federation of Community Services, and in 1921, he was appointed the first Chairman of the new Provincial Mother's Allowances Commission. He worked to help establish the Neighbourhood Workers' Association and Bolton Fresh Air Camp, and was a member of the Toronto Housing Commission.

In 1923, Bryce accepted a call to be the minister of Woodbine Heights Methodist Church. The late 19th and early 20th century saw a movement arise across Canada to amalgamate all of the Reformed Christian denominations in Canada (Methodists, Presbyterians and Congregationalists). This reached fruition in June 1925 with the formation of the United Church of Canada, and Bryce's Methodist church became Woodbine Heights United.

In 1927, the United Church called him away from his pulpit to become General Secretary to its Missionary and Maintenance Department (now the United Church of Canada Mission and Service Fund).

== Moderator ==
At the church's 7th General Council in Ottawa in 1936, Bryce was elected as the church's 7th Moderator. During his two-year term, Bryce became one of the most travelled moderators, visiting small communities that had never seen a moderator before. Bryce also travelled to London for the coronation of George VI as representative of the United Church.

He remained an advocate for the marginalized, oppressed and voiceless in Canada and beyond, and spoke out against the "vitriolic campaign [of] carefully crafted hatred of the Jew" in Europe speaking on the issue at a rally in Toronto in 1938.

In his closing address as Moderator to the 8th General Council, Bryce remarked, "Whatever the future may bring, the United Church of Canada will carry on with courage, faith and hope. The prayer constantly upon my lips during the past two years has been the prayer that the United Church may be found always true to the cross of Christ."

== Return to ministry ==
After stepping down as moderator, Bryce accepted a call to be the minister of Metropolitan United Church in Toronto. In 1928, the church building had largely been destroyed by fire, and in the aftermath, Bryce, as an independent third party, had helped the congregation to come to a decision to rebuild. When Bryce became the minister in 1938, the work was still ongoing, and would not be completed until 1943, leaving the church with a debt of $82,000 ($1.8 million in 2026 dollars). Bryce was a friend of Joseph E. Atkinson, president of the Toronto Star, and he asked for Atkinson's help in publicizing a fundraising campaign. Less than a year later, the debt had been cleared.

== Death ==
In November 1950, CBC Radio was making a documentary about the history of Metropolitan United. Bryce, who had been suffering from a protracted illness, recorded an address about his time at the church and his recollections. The documentary aired on CBC's National Sunday Evening Hour on 26 November 1950. It was the last time his voice was heard — Bryce died four days later, on 30 November 1950.

== Legacy ==
The Blairmore Enterpise noted of his work with the Missionary and Maintenance Fund that "His great gifts as an organizer, his sense of fellowship with his brethren, and his ability to win the confidence of the people have made his work in this difficult field one of the outstanding features of the [United Church]'s life through the years since union."

Saturday Night wrote, "Mothers' allowances and old age pensions, two of the greatest and most unquestioned social advances of our time, were objectives which must have looked almost hopeless when [Bryce] began to pursue them, and which have long since become part of the accepted scheme of things and have lifted intolerable burdens from many a bent back ... A singular gentleness of demeanor masked an indomitable will, directed by a shrewd common sense."

== Personal life ==
While evangelizing in Newfoundland, Bryce met and married Julia Bemister, daughter of Henry J. B. Woods, Newfoundland's Postmaster General. They raised two sons, John Bemister, who would serve with the Ontario Hydro Commission, and Dr. Douglas Bryce, a throat specialist.

Religious titles
| Preceded by Richard Roberts | Moderator of the United Church of Canada; 1936–1938 | Succeeded by John W. Woodside |
