= Thomas Hamilton (architect) =

Scottish architect (1784–1858)

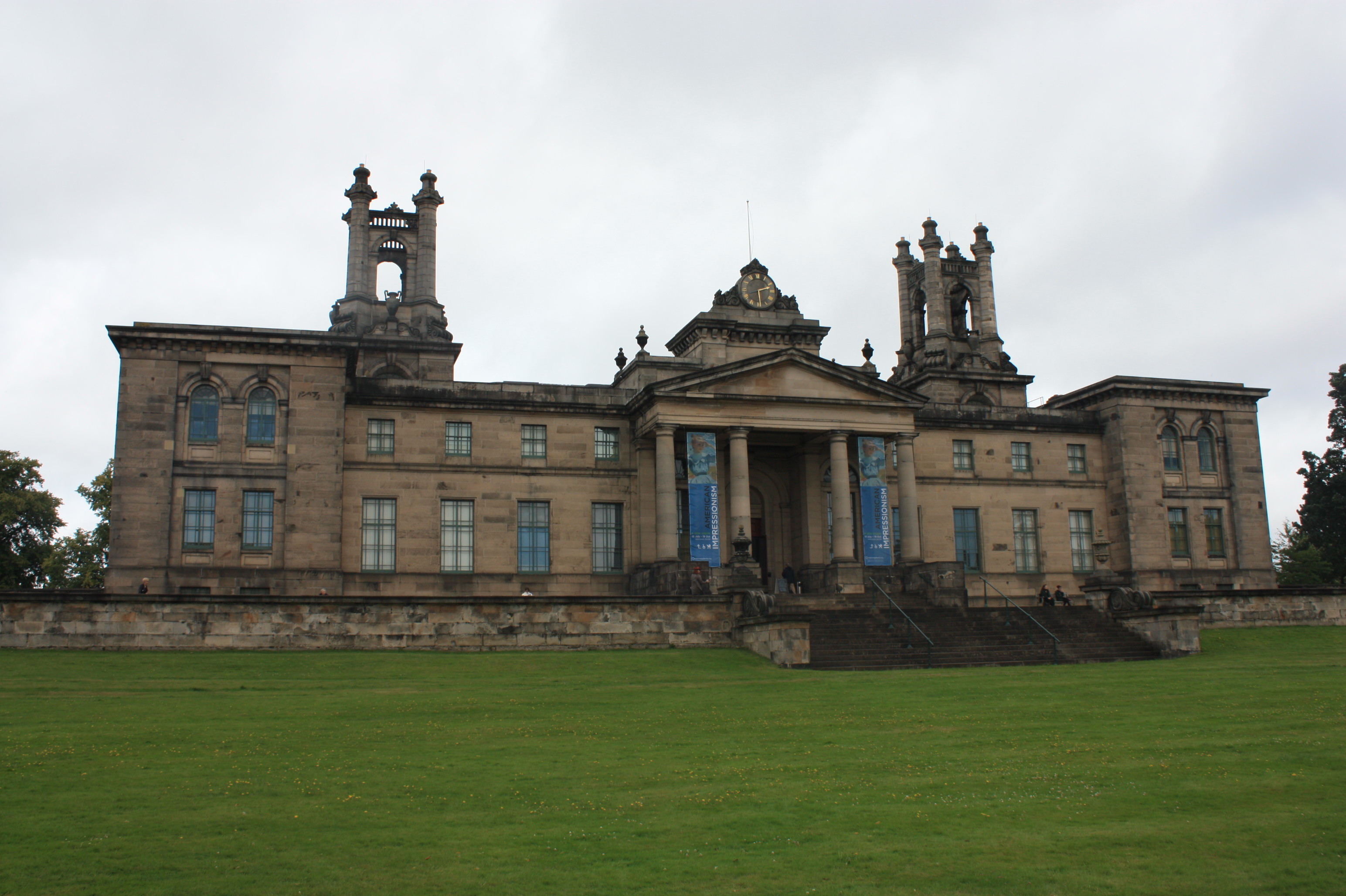
The Dean Orphanage (now Dean Gallery) from the SW

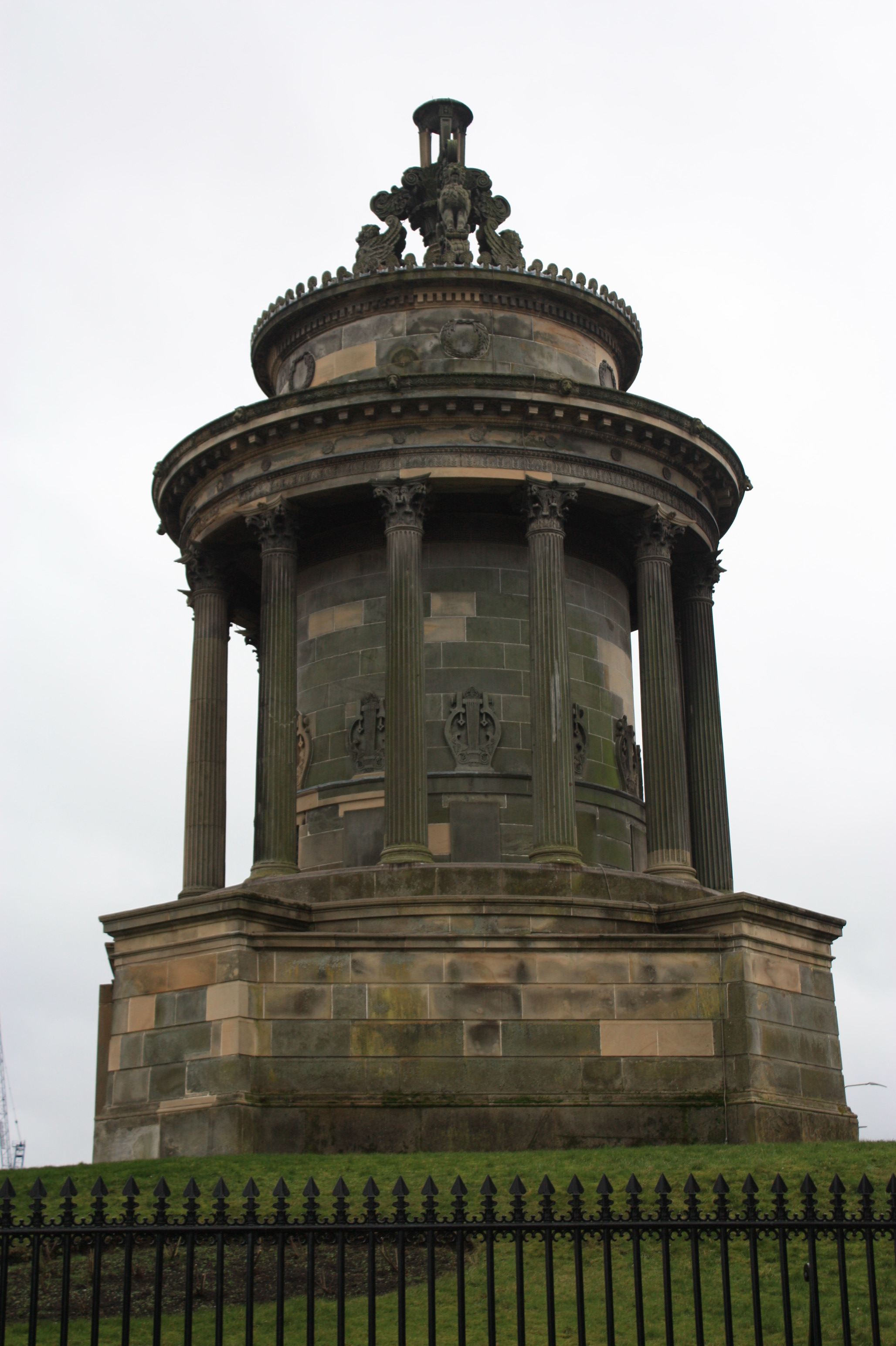
Burns Monument, Edinburgh by Thomas Hamilton

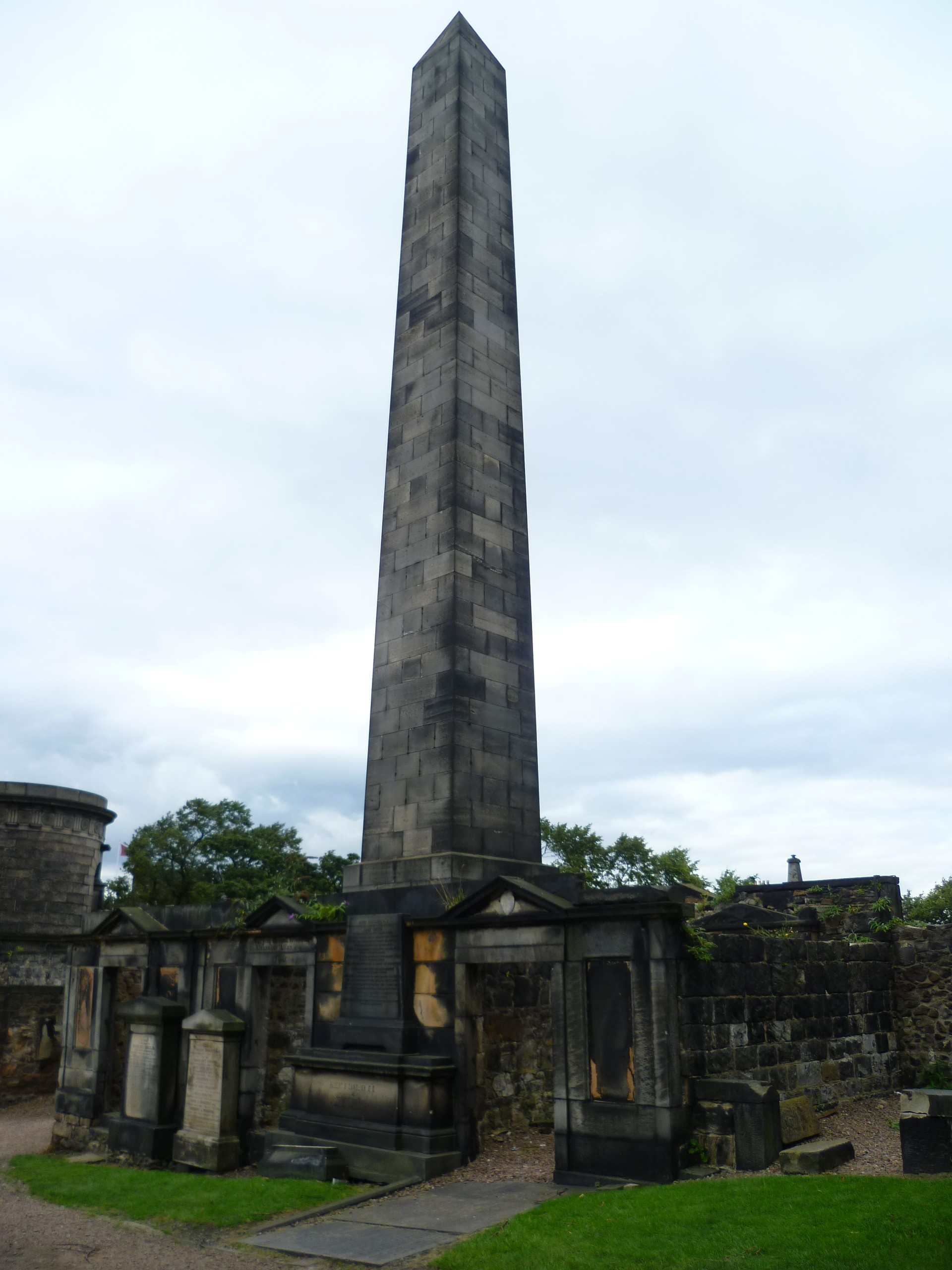
Martyrs Monument, Calton Hill

Thomas Hamilton (11 January 1784 – 24 February 1858) was a Scottish architect, based in Edinburgh where he designed many of that city's prominent buildings. Born in Glasgow, his works include: the Burns Monument in Alloway; the Royal High School on the south side of Calton Hill (long considered as a possible home for the Scottish Parliament); the Royal College of Physicians of Edinburgh; the George IV Bridge, which spans the Cowgate; the Dean Orphan Hospital, now the Dean Gallery; the New North Road Free Church, now the Bedlam Theatre; Cumstoun, a private house in Dumfries and Galloway; and the Scottish Political Martyrs' Monument in Old Calton Cemetery, Edinburgh.

He was one of the leading Greek Revivalists in Scotland, "more imaginative than his peers and more refined in his detailing". He was a favourite of the church for his Gothic designs, being commissioned to design many Free Churches after the Disruption of 1843. He also designed shops and banks, many of which survive.

== Life ==
Hamilton was born on 11 January 1784 in Glasgow to Jean Stevenson and Thomas Hamilton (1754–1824), a carpenter (wright) and cabinet-maker who also worked as an architect, His mother and father were married at the Canongate Church in 1783. His father returned to Edinburgh after his birth and was most notable for remodelling the north-west corner of St Giles' Cathedral in 1796. He was presumably watched by Hamilton who was then 12 years old.

In 1791 his father, working from premises on Brodies Close, substantially altered a building at the head of Old Assembly Close on the Royal Mile in Edinburgh to make it their family home (now known as 166 High Street). It is notable for its arched windows on the first floor, all visible from the street and unlike the other rectangular windows in the block. The Hamiltons occupied all three upper floors, the ground floor being occupied by William Vair, a stocking maker.

Hamilton's father received many City commissions between 1796 and 1803 allowing Hamilton to attend the old High School in High School Yards from 1800 to 1801. The rector at the time was Alexander Adam.

In 1803 the family moved to a newly built house of 47 Princes Street in Edinburgh's New Town. His father (listed as a "wright") still retained a workshop at Allan's Close on the Royal Mile in the Old Town. Hamilton was by then apprenticed to his father. His mother Jean died approximately at the time of this move or shortly before.

In 1804 his father remarried: to Margaret McAra. By this time young Thomas seems largely to have been working under the wing of his uncle. John Hamilton (d.1812), a builder living and operating from 4 Dundas Street in the New Town, helping with building projects such as Heriot Row. During this time he acquired considerable knowledge of stone masonry.

In 1812 his uncle John died and left the bulk of his estate to Hamilton who was 28 years old. This included several houses on Heriot Row and Dundas Street, built by them both.

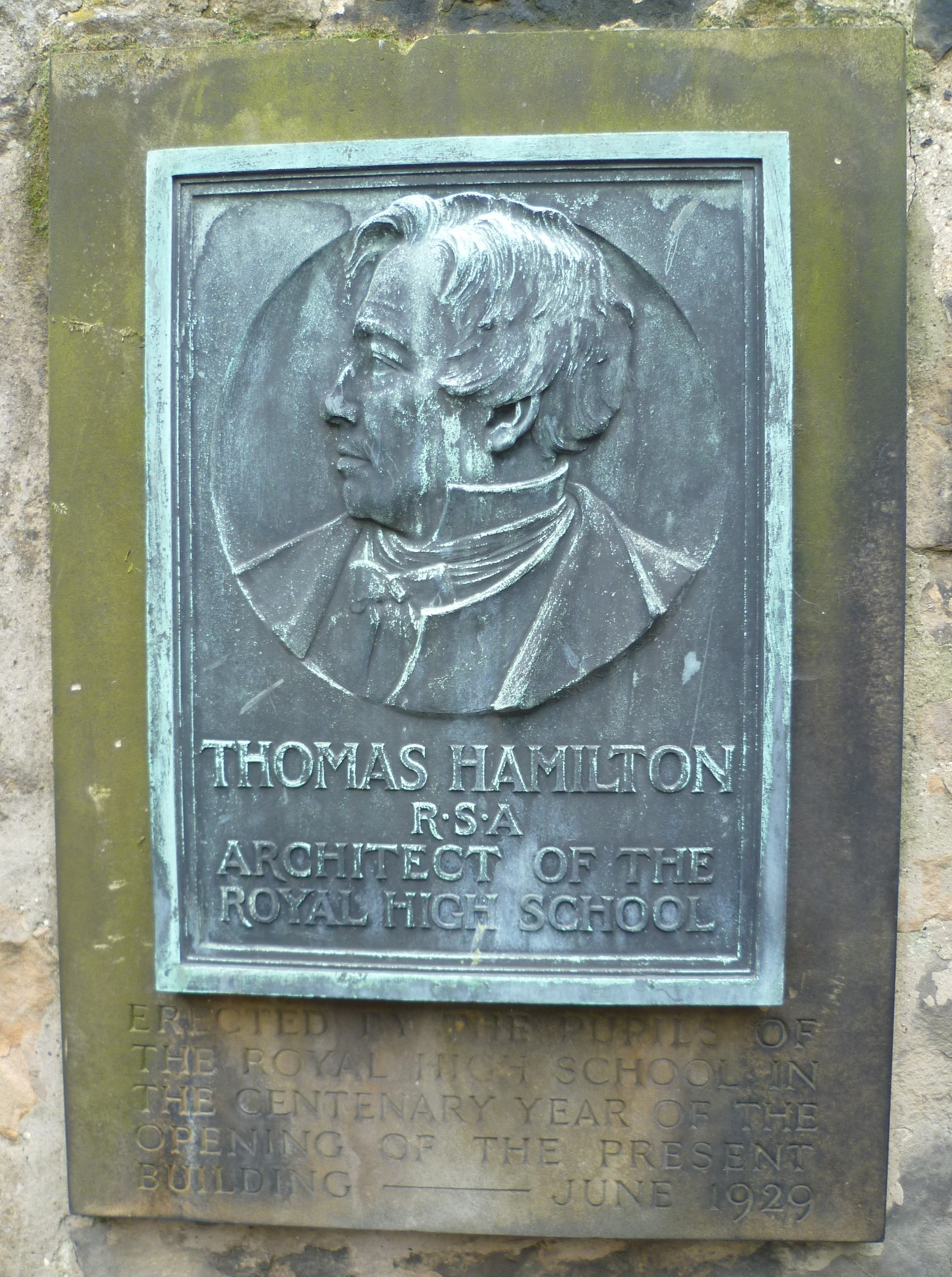
Centenary plaque commemorating the building of the new Royal High School in Edinburgh

Since the move to Princes Street, however, his father's affairs had been in disarray, with Hamilton possibly supporting him to some degree. In 1813 his uncle James Hamilton of Springhill agreed to pay £40 towards his father's debts to fend off creditors, but this was never paid. His father was then pursued through the courts from 1818-1822, resulting in the poinding of his goods. His father removed to Currie where he died in June 1824.

Hamilton's earliest known architectural drawing, dated 1813, is a plan requested by the Dean of Guild for a scheme by Robert Burn (architect) (1752–1815) to remodel a house on St Andrew Street.

Hamilton was a founding member of the Royal Scottish Academy in 1826.

In the 1830s he is listed as living at 57 York Place, on the eastern edge of the Edinburgh New Town.

He trained John Henderson in the 1820s. The architect John Starforth trained under Hamilton in the 1830s.

In 1852, he submitted a design for improving the Bank of Scotland's Head Office, which was unpopular and described as a "prominent deformity" by Lord Cockburn in 1849. The design was of Greek neo-classical style, and he received 200 guineas (£12000 in today's terms).

In his final years he was living at 41 York Place. Interestingly, in deference to his father, he is still referred to as "Thomas Hamilton Junior, architect".

He died at 9 Howe Street (an office) on 24 February 1858. He is buried in John Hamilton's vault in Old Calton Cemetery, a few yards south of the Martyrs Monument. Originally unmarked, the pupils of the Royal High School placed a commemorative wall plaque inside the vault in 1929 (to mark the school's centenary).

== The Martyrs' Monument ==
The Scottish Political Martyrs' Monument is a 90-foot (27 m) tall obelisk which is a prominent feature on the Edinburgh sky-line. It was funded by public subscription raised by the radical MP Joseph Hume. The monument bears the following inscription:

To The Memory Of Thomas Muir, Thomas Fyshe Palmer, William Skirving, Maurice Margarot and Joseph Gerrald. Erected by the Friends of Parliamentary Reform in England and Scotland, 1844.

It includes the following quotation:

I have devoted myself to the cause of The People. It is a good cause - it shall ultimately prevail - it shall finally triumph.

(Speech of Thomas Muir in the Court of Judiciary on 30 August 1793.)

Hamilton also designed the Doric column for the statue of John Knox (1825) in the Glasgow Necropolis (see Glasgow's public statues).

== Burns Monuments (Edinburgh and Alloway) ==
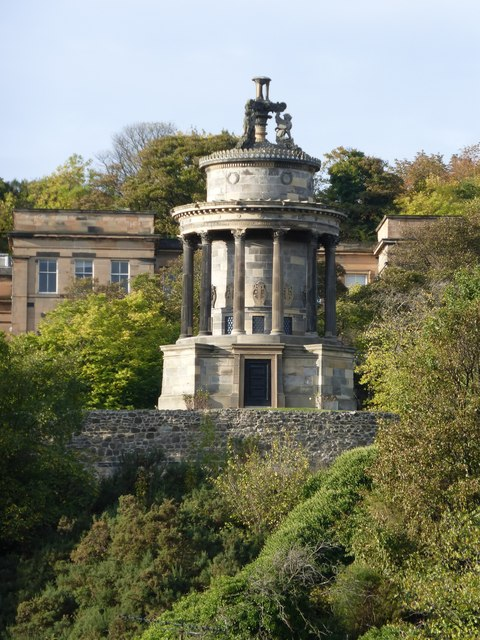
Hamilton's monument to Robert Burns, on Calton Hill, Edinburgh, is based on the Choragic Monument of Lysicrates in Athens.

The building of a mausoleum on the grave of Robert Burns in Dumfries in 1815 was followed by a general move to erect memorials and statues of the bard in other Scottish towns and cities. In October 1817 a competition was announced in Ayrshire seeking designs for a monument at Burns' birthplace at Alloway. Hamilton had been working on just such a project. His design is based on the Monument to Lysicrates in Athens, Greece, a form often associated with poets and poetry. Hamilton won the competition and the foundation stone was laid in 1820, but the project was shelved and debated for years. It was resumed in 1825 and completed in 1828. A bust of Burns by Patrick Park was added in the memorial in 1854. This was replaced in 1884 by a bust donated by the prominent Scots sculptor Sir John Steell.

Following a large subscription in 1817 from Scottish expatriates in India a monument in Edinburgh was funded and after a debate lasting over a decade Thomas Hamilton won this commission in 1831. While largely repeating the design of the Alloway monument, he designed the Edinburgh monument to contain a full sized statue of Burns by John Flaxman. The statue was later removed to the Scottish National Portrait Gallery where it remains on display.

Whilst the Alloway monument is accessible all the year round, the Edinburgh monument is accessible only on special occasions such as Doors Open Day (usually one weekend in late October in Edinburgh). As part of the Edinburgh Art Festival it was opened daily between 28 July 2016 and 28 August 2016.

== List of main architectural works ==
His main works included:

- 1820 Norwich Union Insurance Society Building, 32 Princes Street, Edinburgh, demolished c.1880
- 1822 Kinghorn Town Hall, Fife
- 1823 James Spittal's shop "The Gilded Balloon" on the Cowgate (facing Blair Street) destroyed in the Cowgate fire in 2002
- 1824 Hopetoun Rooms, 72 Queen Street, Edinburgh, demolished 1967
- 1825 John Knox Monument, Glasgow Necropolis
- 1825–28 Burns Monument Alloway, Ayrshire
- 1825–29 Royal High School, Edinburgh
- 1826 1 to 12 Castle Terrace, Edinburgh
- 1827–30 Ayr Town Hall
- 1828 Cumstoun House, near Kirkcudbright
- 1829–32 George IV Bridge, as part of the improvements to the Lawnmarket, Edinburgh
- 1829 John Knox Church, Edinburgh, not executed
- 1829 Monument to Sir Robert & Lady Liston, Churchyard Gogar
- c.1830 Falcon Hall, Morningside Road, Edinburgh, demolished
- 1830 Monument to French Prisoners, Valleyfield Mills, Penicuik
- 1830 Arthur Lodge (attributed), Dalkeith Road, Edinburgh
- 1830 Blackwood's Shop, 45 George St, Edinburgh
- 1830–32 The Manse, Coldstream
- 1831 Dean Orphanage, Edinburgh
- 1831 The Burns Monument, Edinburgh
- 1831–34 Wallace Tower, Ayr
- 1836 Alyth Parish Church, Perth & Kinross
- 1842 Episcopal Chapel, Bath St, Dunfermline
- 1844 Physicians Hall, 9 Queen St, Edinburgh
- 1843 New North Free Church, Forrest Road, Edinburgh
- 1844 St. John's Free Church, Johnston Terrace, Edinburgh
- 1844 Martyrs' Memorial, Old Calton Cemetery, Edinburgh
- 1848 rebuilding of St. Mary's Church, South Leith
- 1850 Free Church, Dunbar
- 1850 Kennoway Church, Fife
- 1858 additions to Dunbeath Castle, Caithness

== Gallery of architectural works ==
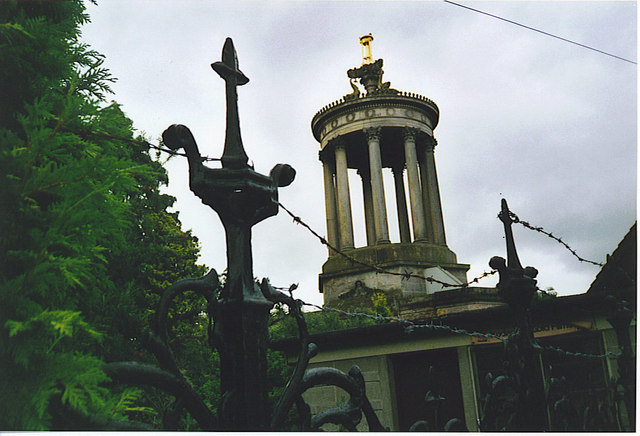
Burns Monument, Alloway

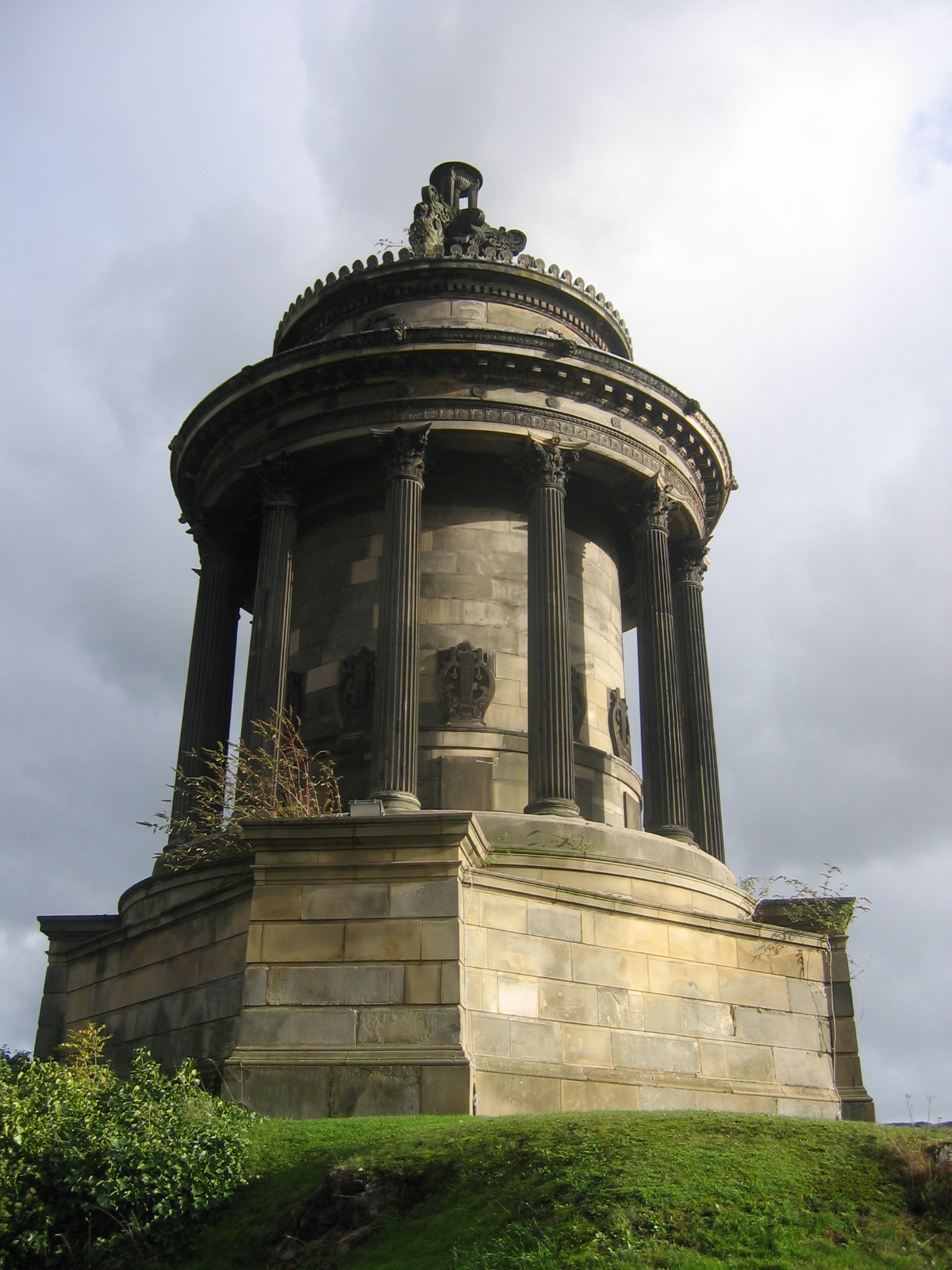
Burns Monument, Edinburgh

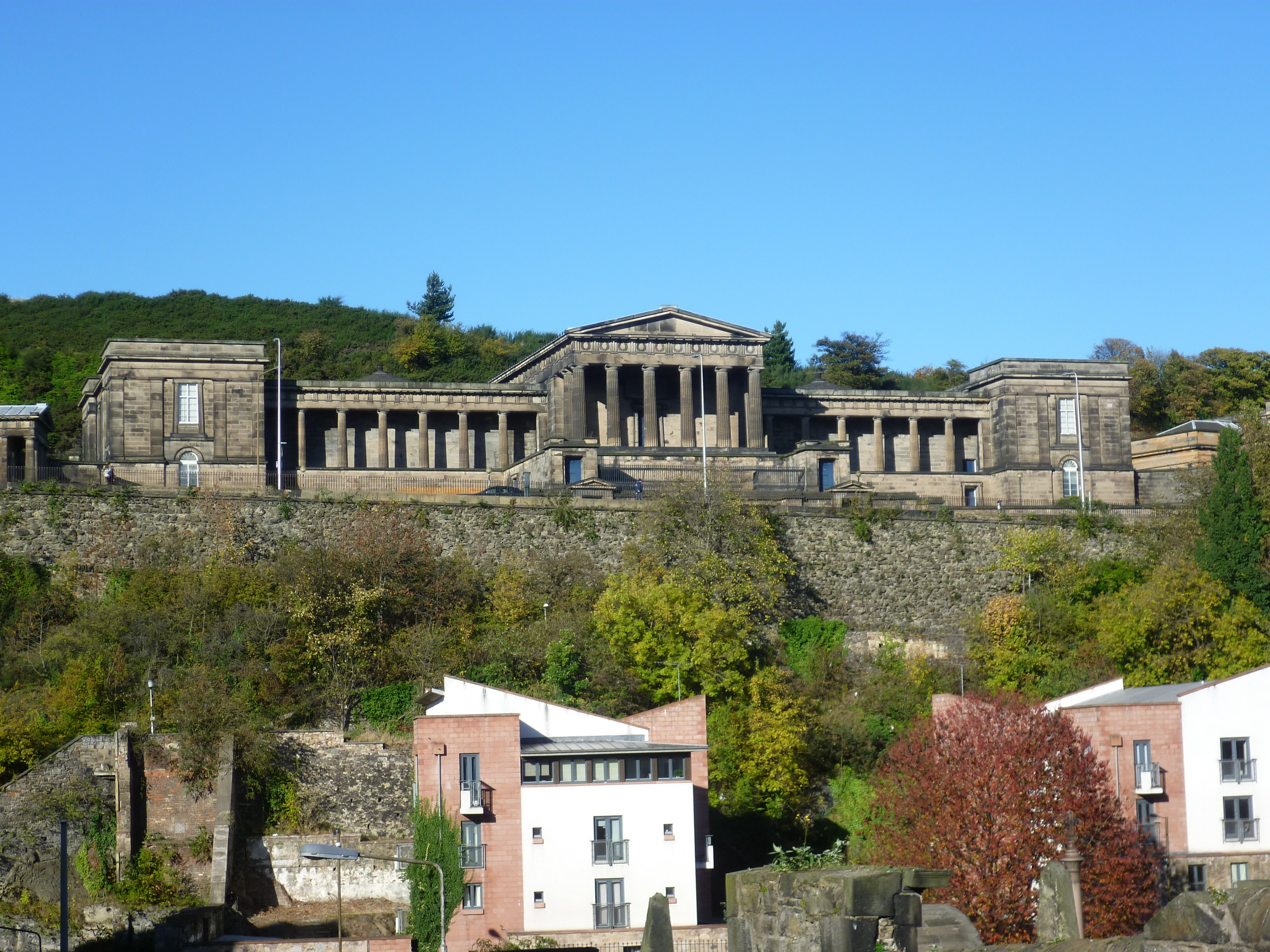
Royal High School, Calton Hill Edinburgh

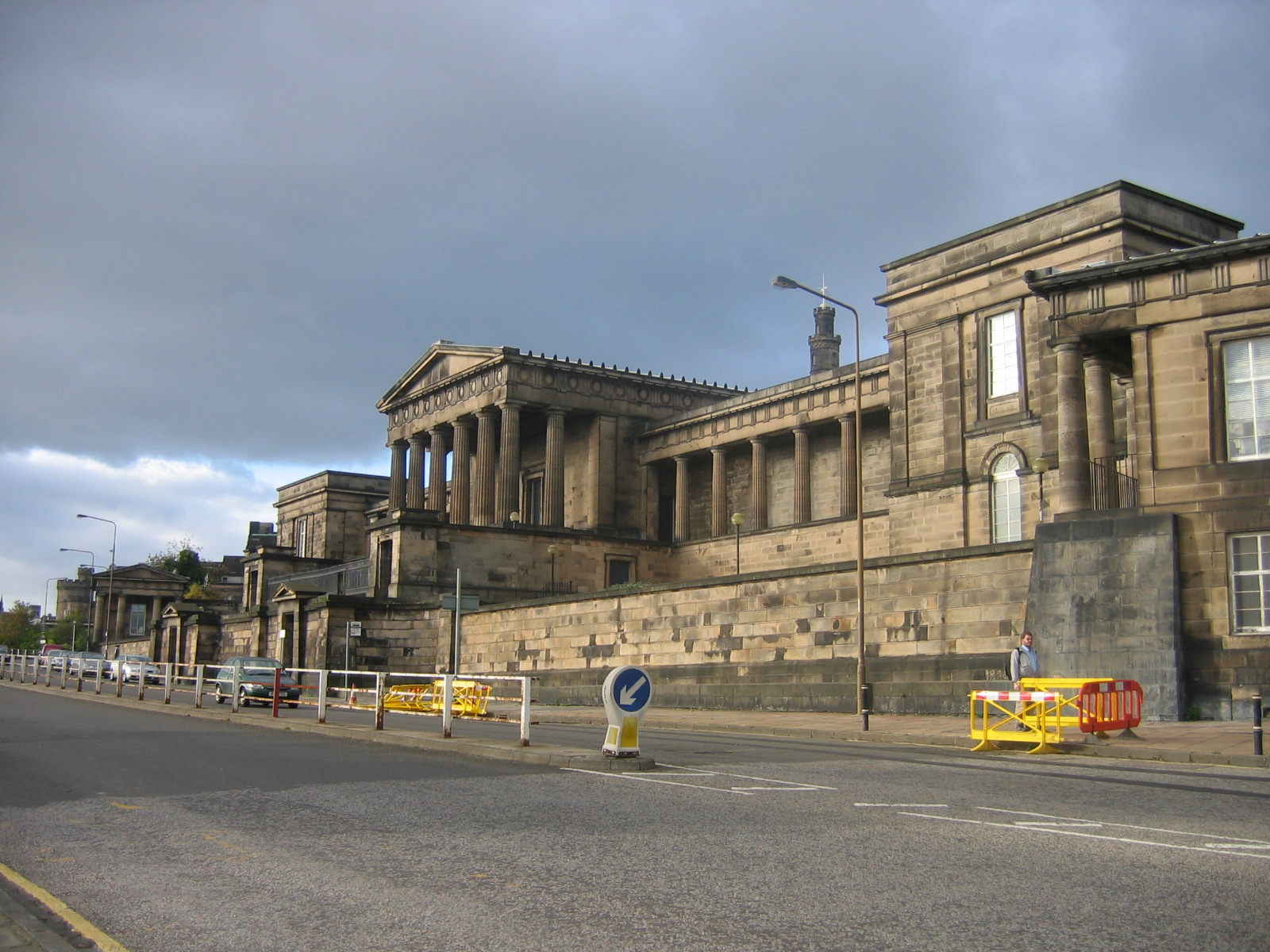
Royal High School, Calton Hill Edinburgh

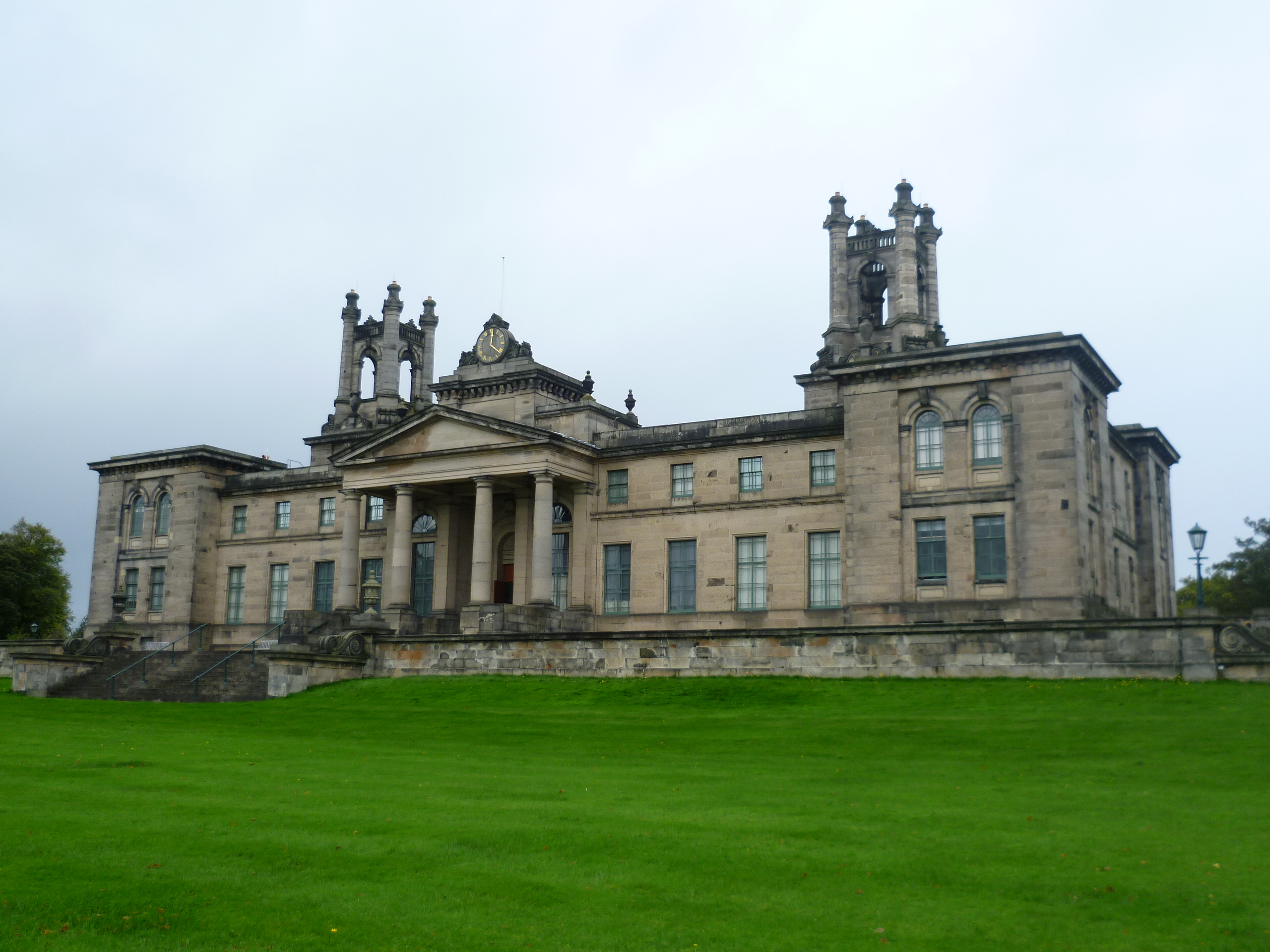
Dean Orphanage, Edinburgh

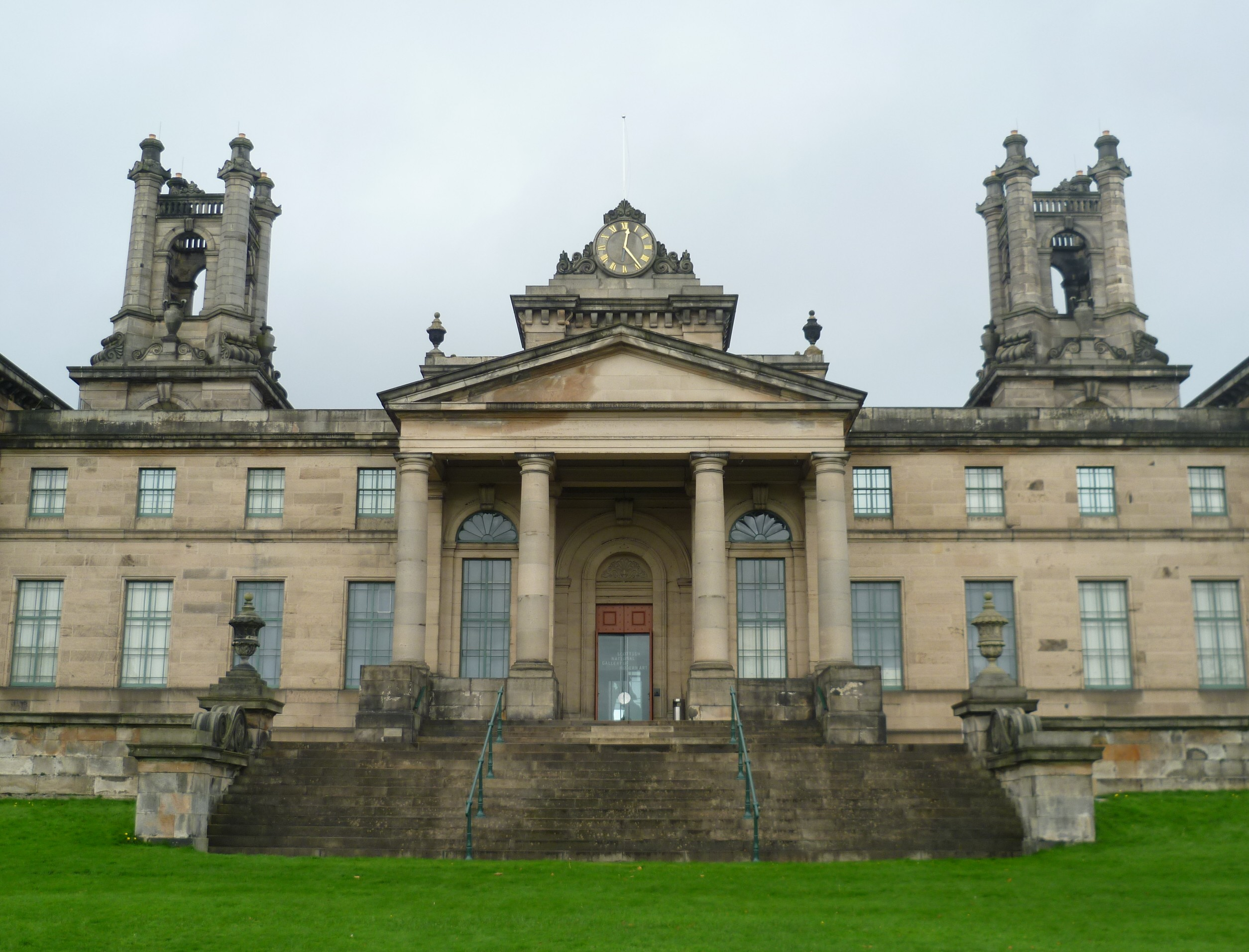
Dean Orphanage portico and towers

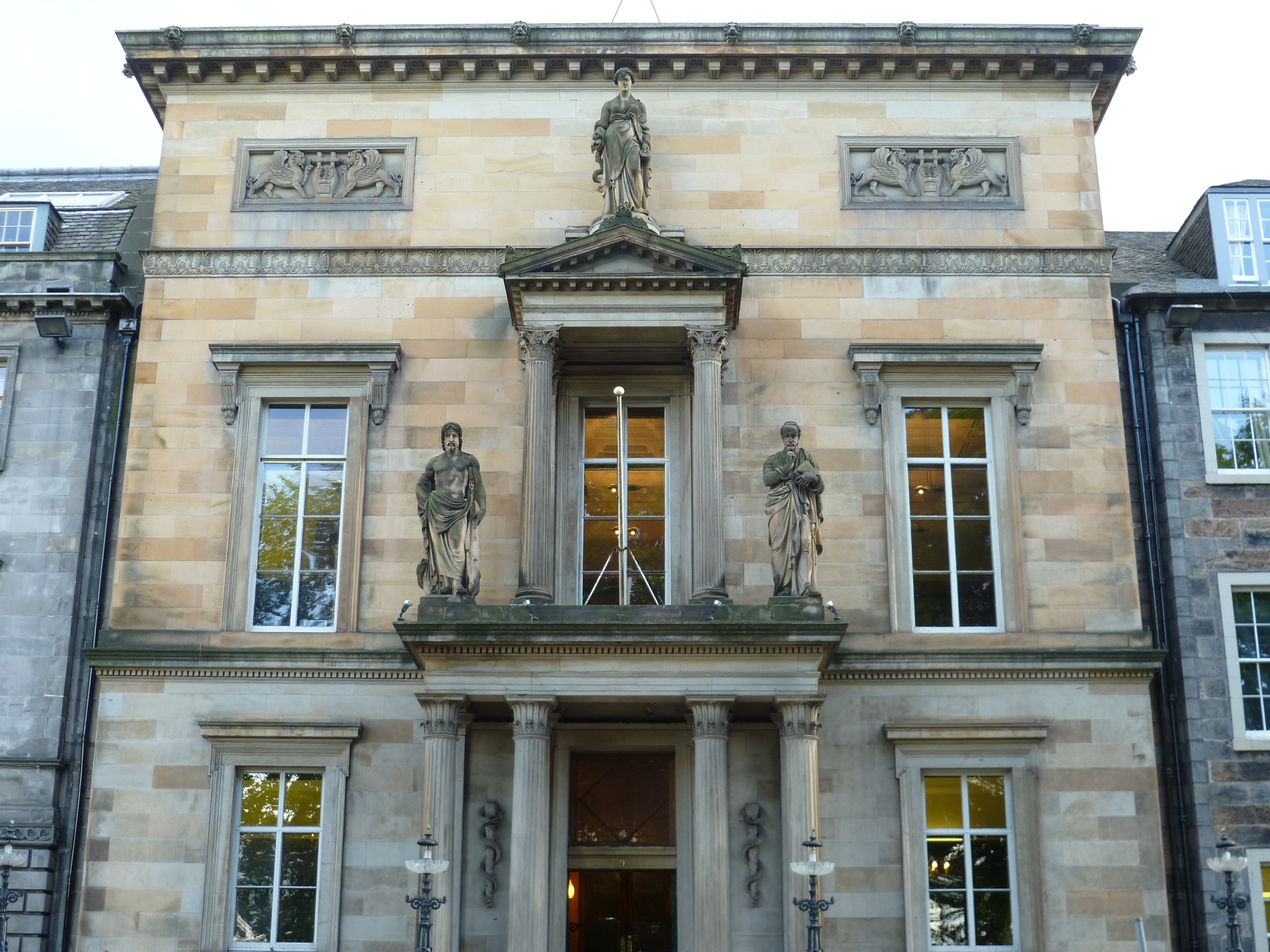
Physicians Hall, Edinburgh

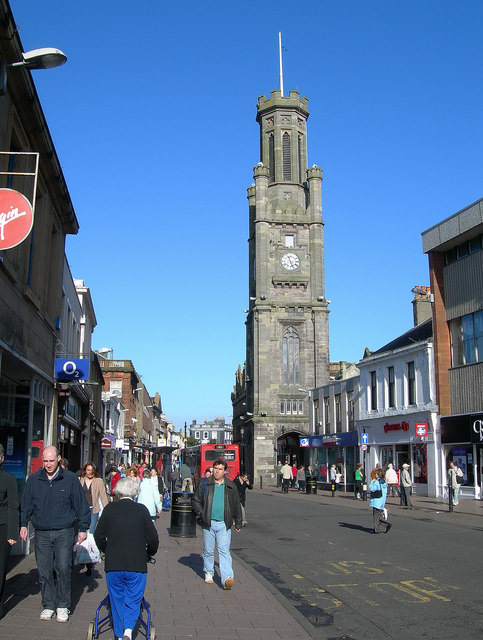
Wallace Tower, Ayr

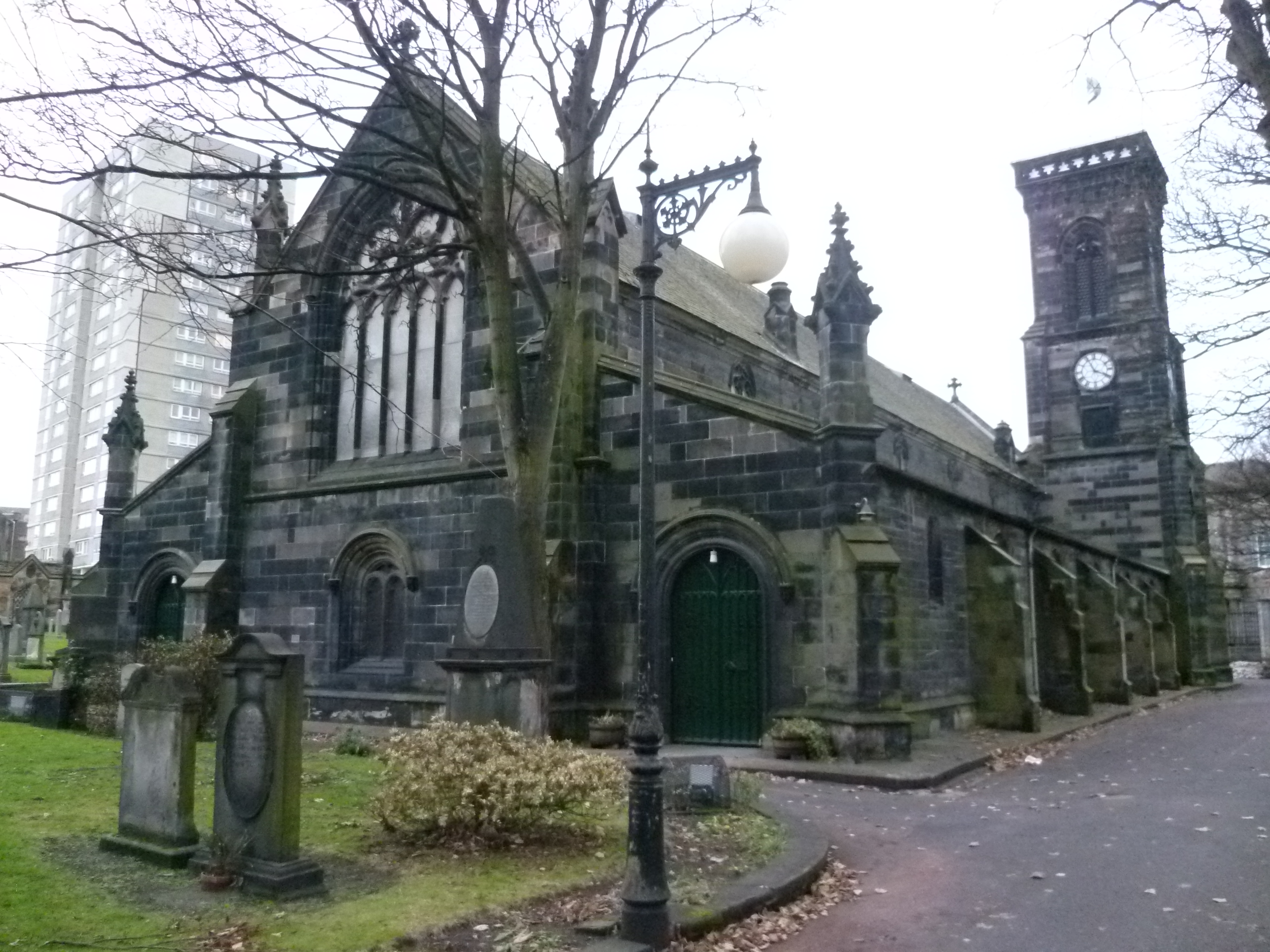
St. Mary's Church, South Leith

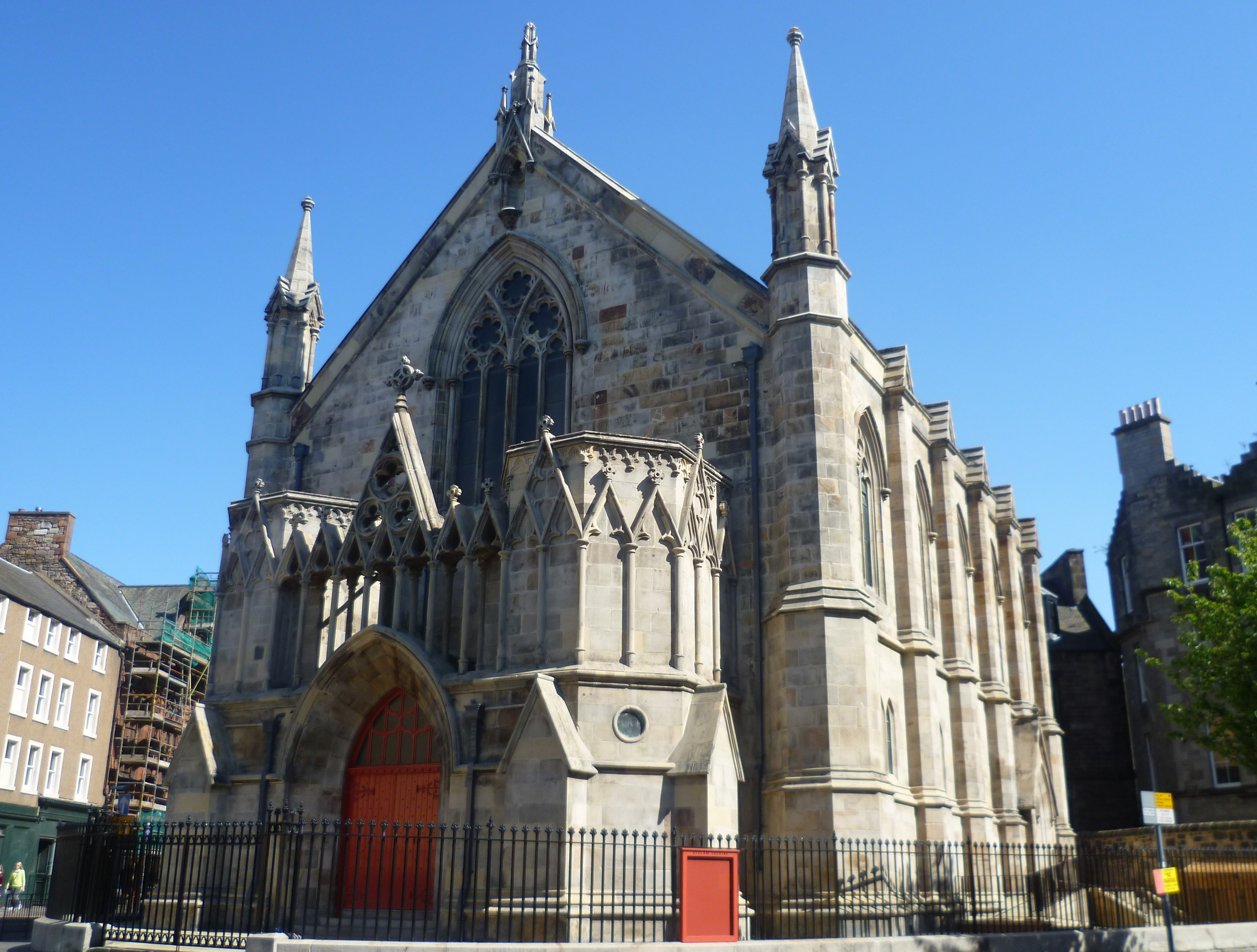
New North Road Free Church, Edinburgh (now the Bedlam Theatre)
