= Bedlam Theatre =

Theatre in Edinburgh, Scotland, a former church

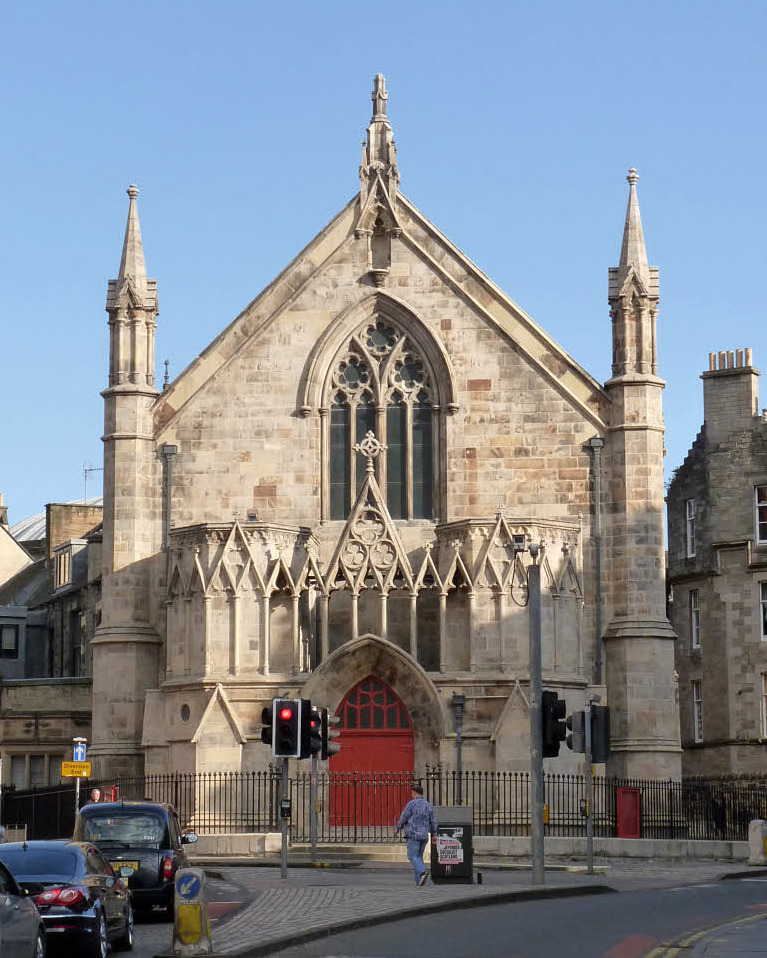
- Former names: New North Free Church (1848–1900); New North United Free Church (1900–1929); New North Church of Scotland (1929–1941); University of Edinburgh Chaplaincy (1957–1975)

General information
- Status: Active
- Type: Theatre
- Architectural style: Decorated Gothic
- Location: 11B Bristo Place; Edinburgh; EH1 1EZ, Edinburgh, Scotland
- Coordinates: 55°56′46.49″N 3°11′26.60″W
- Current tenants: Edinburgh University Theatre Company
- Construction started: 1846
- Completed: 1848
- Renovated: 2012
- Owner: University of Edinburgh

Design and construction
- Architect: Thomas Hamilton

Website
- www.bedlamtheatre.co.uk

Listed Building – Category B
- Official name: Bedlam Theatre (Former New North Free Church), Including Boundary Walls, Forrest Road and Bristo Place, Edinburgh
- Designated: 4 July 2001
- Reference no.: LB30020

Bedlam Theatre is a theatre in the Old Town of Edinburgh, Scotland. The building was completed in 1848 for the New North Free Church. After closing as a church in 1941, the building served as a chaplaincy centre and then a store for the University of Edinburgh before reopening in 1980 as the student-run theatre of Edinburgh University Theatre Company (EUTC), operating during Edinburgh Fringe festival as venue 49.

The New North Free Church originated in the Disruption of 1843, when Charles John Brown, minister of the New North Church, led many of his congregation out of the Church of Scotland and into the newly established Free Church. The church was noted for its active mission and its ministry to students. After its congregation united with Greyfriars in 1941, the University of Edinburgh used the building as a chaplaincy centre and then, from 1975, as a store. The university gifted the building to EUTC, who reopened it as the Bedlam Theatre in 1980. It is named for the lunatic asylum, which once stood nearby. With a capacity of 90, the building remains the United Kingdom's oldest student-run theatre, hosting around 40 EUTC productions each year as well as up to eight shows a day during the Edinburgh Fringe.

The building was designed in the Decorated Gothic style by Thomas Hamilton. It forms an important part of the Old Town cityscape, terminating the view south along George IV Bridge. The theatre, restored in 2012, has been protected as a Category B listed building since 2001.

== New North Free Church ==
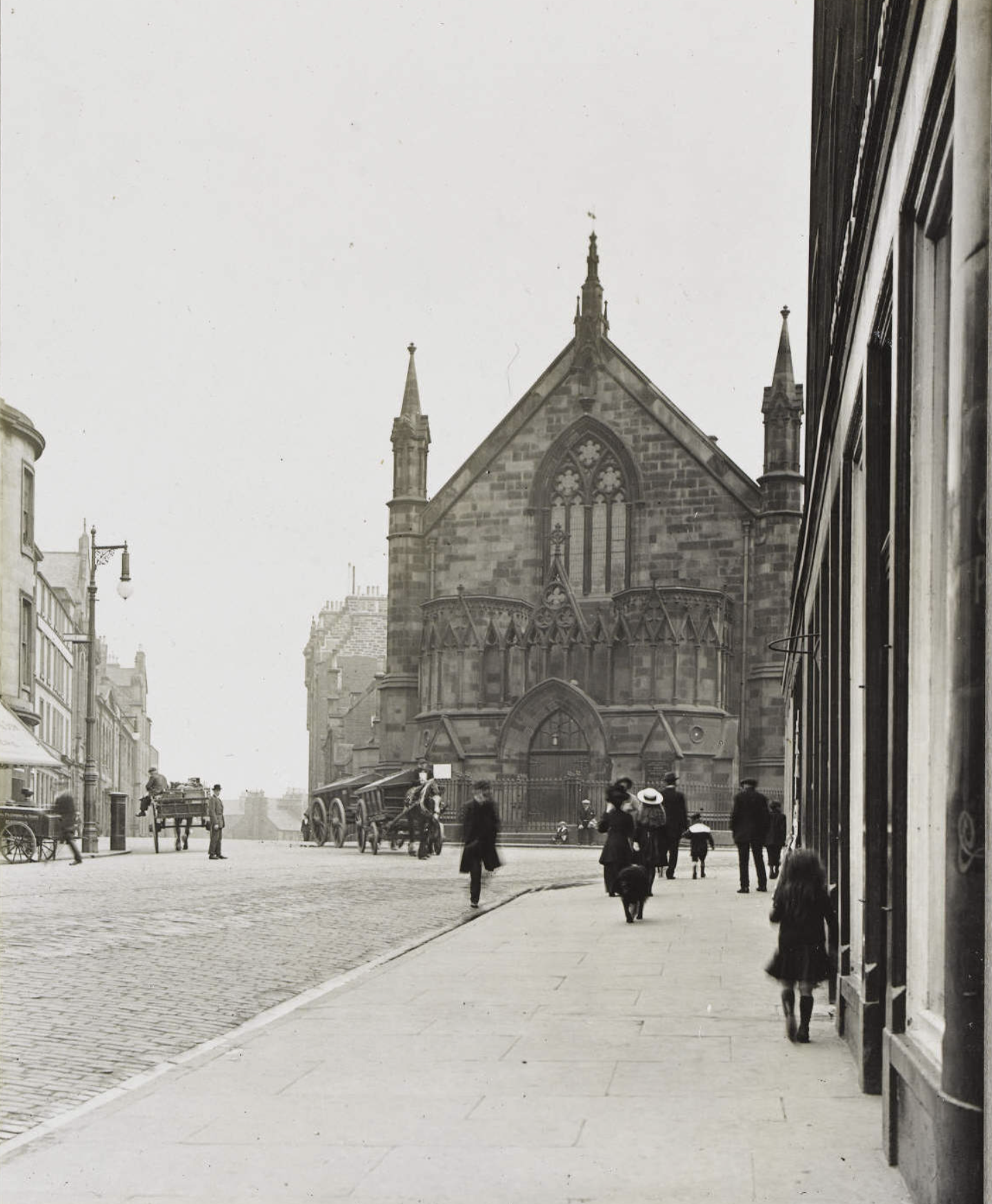
The New North United Free Church in 1913

The New North Free Church originated in the New North Church, which, at the time of the Disruption of 1843, was meeting in the chapel at Brighton Street in the Bristo. In November 1842, prior to the Disruption, the church's minister, Charles John Brown, joined other evangelical ministers in promising to leave the Church of Scotland if state interference in the national church was not ended. After the Free congregation left the New North Church in May 1843, it first met at an independent chapel nearby in Argyle Square. (Note: The site of Argyle Square is now covered by Chambers Street; the congregation of this chapel would go on to form Augustine Congregational Church.)

The established congregation having returned to its historic home at St Giles', the free congregation worshipped again in Brighton Street from November 1843. When the building was sold to an Evangelical Union congregation in 1846, the Free congregation moved to the United Secession Church in Potterrow. The church's building was constructed on the site of the city poorhouse at a cost of £7,000, opening June 1848. That year, New North Free counted 650 members.

The church ministered in an area of significant poverty, founding missions, a Sabbath school, and a day school. In 1852, the congregation assumed responsibility for a Free Church mission in the Cowgate, which, from the following year, met at Mary's Chapel. Under Brown, the mission proved a success and was elevated to a full charge in 1859. The church's district (equivalent to a parish) was thereafter moved to cover the Bristo and, in 1880, the congregation purchased a former dance hall on Marshall Street to serve as mission premises.

Brown's death in 1884 greatly affected the congregation, as did the deaths of nine other senior office holders between 1885 and 1891. By 1893, membership had declined to 470; though, during the ministry of John Kelman from 1897 to 1907, this revived somewhat, standing at 560 in 1900. The church also had a long connection with student life that continued into the early 20th century and Kelman established a special students' service. Both Kelman and his successor, John R.P. Sclater, were celebrated preachers of the liberal evangelical tendency.

In 1900, the Free Church united with the United Presbyterian Church to form the United Free Church. Like most Free congregations, New North joined the new denomination. In 1929, the United Free Church united with the Church of Scotland and New North rejoined the national church. The union created an extraneous number of parish churches in the Old Town and Southside: areas where the population was also declining. In this context, the congregation united with nearby Greyfriars on 23 March 1941. Greyfriars retained the New North mission halls in Marshall Street until their sale in 1961.

=== Ministers ===
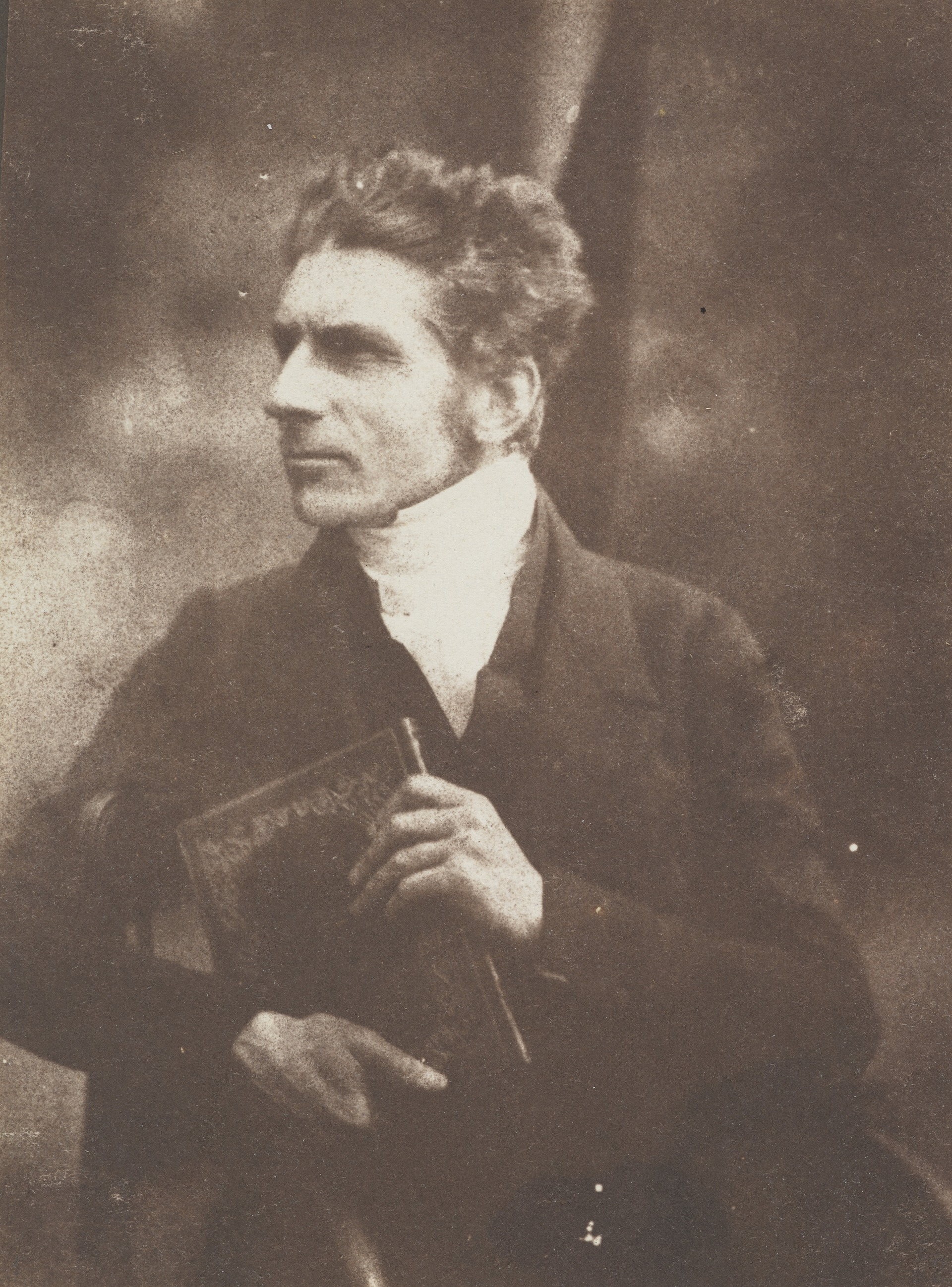
Charles John Brown: first minister of the church

The following ministers served New North Free Church (1843–1900); New North United Free Church (1900–1929); and New North Church of Scotland (1929–1941):

1843–1884 Charles John Brown
1860–1867 Andrew Crichton
1866–1897 Robert Gordon Balfour
1897–1907 John Kelman
1907–1923 John Robert Paterson Sclater
1923–1928 William Wallace Gauld
1928–1941 Duncan William Park Strang

== Bedlam Theatre ==
=== History ===
After the congregation vacated the building, the University of Edinburgh used it as a chaplaincy centre from 1957. In this period, the building was the site of a teach-in on Northern Ireland in 1969, during the early days of the Troubles. After the completion of a purpose-built space within the Potterrow Student Centre in 1973, the chaplaincy vacated the former New North Church two years later and the university used the building as a store. Contemporary suggestions for the building's use included a library for nursing students.

After the chaplaincy vacated the building, it was occasionally used for student dramatic performances and as an overspill venue for the Traverse Theatre during the annual Edinburgh Fringe. One notable production in this period was Bradford University Dramatic Society's Satan's Ball (an adaptation of Mikhail Bulgakov's The Master and Margarita) at the 1977 Fringe. The university supported a project to convert the building into a thrust stage theatre named in memory of Tyrone Guthrie. To this end, an appeal for £150,000 was launched in 1979 but proved unsuccessful. The university instead offered the building to the Edinburgh University Theatre Company (EUTC). The building reopened on 31 January 1980 as the Bedlam Theatre. Adrian Evans, EUTC's president for that year, suggested the name Bedlam in reference the city bedlam, which stood immediately south of the building.

The university saw the building as only a temporary home for EUTC and funds for its conversion were limited. Chris Ward of Centaur Lighting was charged with leading the conversion. Initially, the lighting rig was supported by the building's galleries while the ground floor seats were taken from a cinema. Internal rearrangements of the building have been carried out on occasions including a 1990 production of Pericles and a 1998 production of Hamlet.

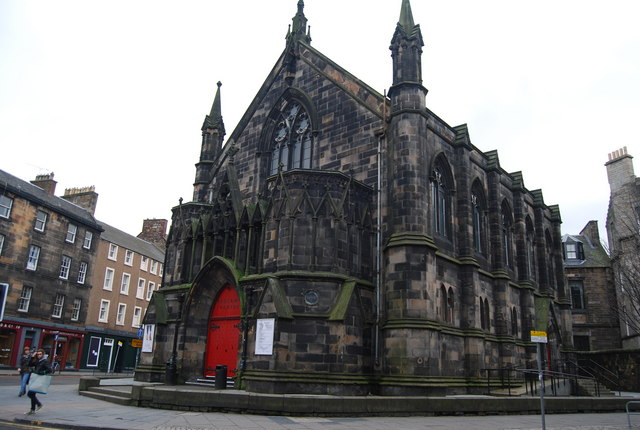
The exterior prior to renovations in 2012

In June 2001, the university proposed that EUTC vacate the Bedlam Theatre to allow for its demolition by hotel developers. EUTC rejected the proposal and, the following month, Historic Scotland upgraded the building's listing status from Category C to Category B, effectively preventing its demolition. Its future as a theatre, however, remained uncertain. In March 2002, the council rejected revised hotel plans, which would have excluded Bedlam while involving the demolition of a collection of 18th-century buildings to its rear.

In this context, the Friends of Bedlam formed in 2003. The friends are an association of EUTC alumni which supports the theatre. Backed by an investment of £500,000, the friends supported the first comprehensive internal and external renovation of the building from 2008. Work commenced in 2012 with the cleaning and restoration of the external stonework and the reintroduction of railings around the building, the originals having been removed for scrap during the Second World War.

=== Today ===
The auditorium can accommodate 90 patrons. The theatre also has a bar and cafe.

The building is the United Kingdom's oldest fully student-run theatre and one of Edinburgh's leading smaller (but nevertheless mighty) venues. In addition to around 40 productions staged each year by EUTC, it can host up to eight shows a day during the Edinburgh Fringe, when it is numbered Fringe Venue 49. Throughout the year, the theatre is also home to improvisational comedy troupe The Improverts, who are the longest running comedy troupe in Edinburgh. Since 2012, the theatre has been part of Creative Carbon Scotland's Green Arts Initiative and has promoted awareness of environmental issues through shows as well as using sustainable practices. Work with the initiative has included, in 2013, Dramatic Impact: a green theatre festival. In 2015, the theatre adopted e-ticketing as an environmental measure.

== Building ==
With the Disruption, the Free Church moved to erect buildings as quickly as possible with comfort and safety being the only requirements. In this context, Thomas Hamilton emerged as an arbiter or architectural taste for the new denomination. At the New North Free Church, he was pitched against David Cousin and George Smith in a competition to choose the design of the church. After his design was accepted, Hamilton argued unsuccessfully for the addition of a spire to the building.

The resulting building is, in the words of the Buildings of Scotland guide to Edinburgh, "a thinly detailed early Dec rectangle". The church consists of a wide nave under a pitch roof. At the exterior side walls, heavy buttresses divide the nave's five bays while a shallow parapet runs along the top. A course of moulding divides each bay into two storeys, with a simple traceried in the top storey and smaller twin lancets in the bottom. A shallow, polygonal apse defines the building's southern end. The front elevation at the northern end consists of twin, two-storey, semi-octagonal stair towers on either side of a projecting porch. Heavy buttresses support the lower storeys of these towers while the upper storeys are decorated with blind tracey, which is continuous with an openwork screen above the arched doorway. The wide gable of the north elevation contains a traceried window and is flanked by octagonal turrets with pinnacles. The apex of the gable includes a niche and is capped by a pinnacle. The interior retains its gallery, supported on cast iron columns; while the apse still contains the organ loft and Gothic screens. Over the nave is a single-span timber roof.

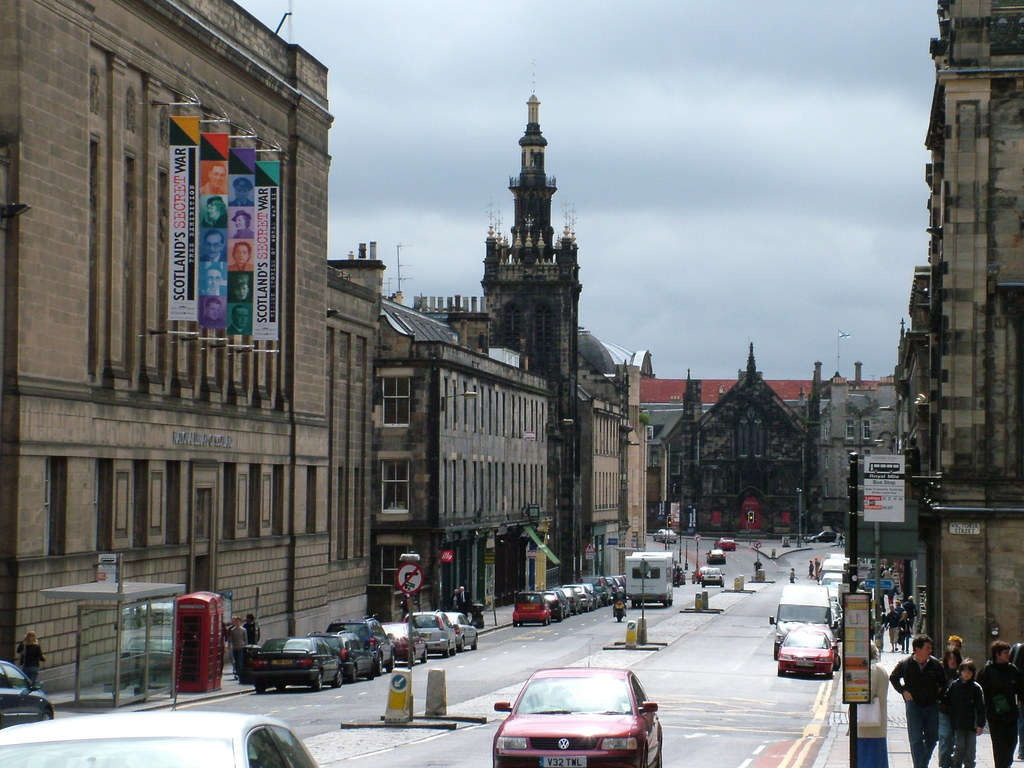
The theatre forms an important part of the Old Town cityscape.

Additions to the building include a single-storey, flat-roofed vestry and waiting room at the east side of the building. This was constructed in 1903 to a perpendicular Gothic design of Scott & Campbell. Alexander Lorne Campbell of Scott & Campbell also undertook work on the interior of the church in 1932.

The theatre has been protected as a Category B listed building since 4 July 2001.

=== Assessment ===
Critical responses to the design have been generally negative. Comparing it to contemporaneous churches in Edinburgh, the Buildings of Scotland guide to Edinburgh says: "Unusually honest was Thomas Hamilton's New North Free Church (1846–48), where no serious attempt was made to hide the breadth of the gable or, for that matter, to design an authentically Gothic building." Church historian A. Ian Dunlop described the building as "small, inconvenient and in no way architecturally pleasing". Architectural historian Joe Rock stated the simplicity of Hamilton's Gothic church designs was best complemented by exteriors of rough masonry: as at Free St John's and Roxburgh Free. Rock argued that, in contrast to these, the ashlar of New North Free is "not so successful".

Nevertheless, the building forms an important part of the Old Town's cityscape, terminating the view south along George IV Bridge. Two decades prior to the opening of the New North Free Church, Hamilton had, along with William Burn, led the design of civic improvements in the Old Town. Hamilton's plans were not executed in their entirety but they included both the George IV Bridge and the triangular block formed by Teviot Row, Bristo Place, and Forrest Road at whose northern point the Bedlam Theatre now stands.
