= Moderator of the United Church of Canada =

Religious title

The Moderator of the United Church of Canada is the most senior elected official within the United Church of Canada. They may be a lay person or a member of the Order of Ministry and is elected to a three-year term by commissioners attending the church's triannual General Council. The current Moderator is Rev. Dr. Kimberly Heath, who was elected to the office at the 45th General Council in August 2025 and installed on August 11.

== Role ==
The Moderator's authority exists by their ability to influence the direction of the denomination, rather than any sort of direct power to unilaterally enact changes. Duties of the Moderator include:

- giving leadership ("especially in spiritual things, quickening in the hearts of the people a sense of God as revealed in Christ, and heartening and strengthening the whole United Church")
- visiting pastoral charges across the country, "giving sympathetic guidance and counsel, and reporting to the General Council and its executive".
- being the primary spokesperson and representative for the United Church
- presiding at the meetings of the United Church's highest court, the triannual General Council, and chairing meetings of the General Council's Executive and Sub-Executive.

== History of the office ==
When the United Church of Canada was founded in 1925, General Councils were biennial, giving each moderator a two-year term of office. (The first exception was the first moderator, George C. Pidgeon, who only served for one year. At the 1994 General Council, the commissioners voted to make General Councils triennial, thus increasing the moderator's term to three years. The exception to this was the 43rd moderator, Richard Bott, who had his term extended to four years when the 44th General Council was postponed by one year due to the COVID-19 pandemic.)

Although most moderators have been ordained ministers, this is not a requirement of office, and to date, four moderators have been lay persons — Robert Baird McClure, Anne M. Squire, Marion Best, and Mardi Tindal. If the moderator is ordained, they are styled the "Right Reverend" while in office, and the "Very Reverend" afterwards.

== Current and past Moderators ==
Term	Individual	General Council	Location of General Council
2025 to Present	Kimberly Heath	45th	Calgary AB
2022–2025	Carmen Lansdowne	44th	Vancouver BC
2018–2022	Richard Bott	43rd	Oshawa, ON
2015-2018	Jordan Cantwell	42nd	Corner Brook, NL
2012-2015	Gary Paterson	41st	Ottawa, ON
2009-2012	Mardi Tindal	40th	Kelowna, BC
2006-2009	David Giuliano	39th	Thunder Bay, ON
2003-2006	Peter Short	38th	Wolfville, NS
2000-2003	Marion Pardy	37th	Toronto, ON
1997-2000	Bill Phipps	36th	Camrose, AB
1994-1997	Marion Best	35th	Fergus, ON
1992-1994	Stan McKay	34th	Fredericton, NB
1990-1992	Walter H. Farquharson	33rd	London, ON
1988-1990	Sang Chul Lee	32nd	Victoria, BC
1986-1988	Anne M. Squire	31st	Sudbury, ON
1984-1986	Robert F. Smith	30th	Morden, MB
1982-1984	W. Clarke MacDonald	29th	Montreal, QC
1980-1982	Lois M. Wilson	28th	Halifax, NS
1977-1980	George M. Tuttle	27th	Calgary, AB
1974-1977	Wilbur K. Howard	26th	Guelph, ON
1972-1974	Bruce McLeod	25th	Saskatoon, SK
1971-1972	Arthur B. B. Moore	24th	Niagara Falls, ON
1968-1971	Robert Baird McClure	23rd	Kingston, ON
1966-1968	Wilfred C. Lockhart	22nd	Waterloo, ON
1964-1966	Ernest M. Howse	21st	St. John's, NL
1962-1964	James R. Mutchmor	20th	London, ON
1960-1962	Hugh A. McLeod	19th	Edmonton, AB
1958-1960	Angus J. MacQueen	18th	Ottawa, ON
1956-1958	James S. Thomson	17th	Windsor, ON
1954-1956	George Dorey	16th	Sackville, NB
1952-1954	Alexander A. Scott	15th	Hamilton, ON
1950-1952	Clarence M. Nicholson	14th	Toronto, ON
1948-1950	Willard E. Brewing	13th	Vancouver, BC
1946-1948	Thomas W. Jones	12th	Montreal, QC
1944-1946	Jesse H. Arnup	11th	London, ON
1942-1944	John R. P. Sclater	10th	Belleville, ON
1940-1942	Aubrey S. Tuttle	9th	Winnipeg, MB
1938-1940	John W. Woodside	8th	Toronto, ON
1936-1938	Peter Bryce	7th	Ottawa, ON
1934-1936	Richard Roberts	6th	Kingston, ON
1932-1934	T. Albert Moore	5th	Hamilton, ON
1930-1932	Edmund H. Oliver	4th	London, ON
1928-1930	William T. Gunn	3rd	Winnipeg, MB
1926-1928	James Endicott	2nd	Montreal, QC
1925-1926	George C. Pidgeon	1st	Toronto, ON
