= Clergy of the United Church of Canada =

The clergy of the United Church of Canada are called "ministers". There are two "streams", ordered ministry and lay ministry. Ordered ministry includes ordained ministers and diaconal ministers. Lay ministry refers to licensed lay worship leaders (LLWL), designated lay ministers (DLM), sacraments elders, and congregational designated ministers (CDM). There are no restrictions on gender, sexual orientation, age, or marital status for any branches of ministry.

== Discernment ==
Discernment is the first step in becoming a minister, and is the process of examining why a candidate wants to become a minister; if the person is suited to ministry; and which ministry stream would be best for the person in light of their gifts and talents. The discernment process begins first with a sponsoring congregation, then with national Office of Vocation.

== Ordered ministry ==
An ordained minister leads the community of faith in worship, preaches, administers the sacraments, provides leadership to the congregation and spiritual support to those who are ill or in need, as well as acting as the face of the congregation to the wider community. An ordained minister is ex officio approved to administer the sacraments of Baptism and Communion and may use the honorific style "The Reverend".

A diaconal minister — "diaconal" comes from the Greek word diakonia, which means "service among others" — focuses on education, pastoral care and enabling the congregation to work together toward a vision of justice and wholeness in the world. The United Church diaconate dates back to the establishment of Presbyterian and Methodist Deaconess Orders and Deaconness training schools in the 1890's. In the 1980s Deaconesses, Certified Churchmen, and Commissioned Ministers became known as Diaconal Ministers.

=== Educational requirements ===
Once a person interested in ministry has completed the discernment process at the congregational and Regional Council levels, there are various educational requirements to be met.

A person wishing to be an ordained minister must usually already have a bachelor's degree and earn a Master of Divinity (M.Div.) at one of five approved theological schools.

Candidates for diaconal ministry study through national field-based programs for diplomas with the Centre for Christian Studies or the Sandy Saulteaux Spiritual Centre, which are both based in Manitoba. These programs integrate field education, academic study and learning circles.

=== A candidate's first congregation ===
From 1925 until 2010, a candidate for either stream of ordered ministry did not choose his or her first congregation, but instead, in a process called Transfer and Settlement, the person was sent to a pastoral charge or recognized ministry somewhere in Canada that had requested a minister. The new minister was required to stay at this posting for a minimum of three years before seeking another call. If a candidate could not be settled, he or she could not be ordained or commissioned, but instead had to wait a year for another settlement opportunity.

At the 40th General Council in August 2009, the process was modified so that candidates had the option to be settled using the old settlement process or to seek a congregation on their own. If a candidate chose the latter option but was unable to find one, he or she could not be ordained or commissioned that year.

At the 42nd General Council in 2015 — subsequently approved by the wider church in 2017 — the old Transfer and Settlement system was eliminated completely; newly graduated candidates for ministry now must find and accept a call from a community of faith before ordination or commissioning can proceed.

=== Installation ===
Ordination and commissioning of all successful candidates in a conference takes place at the Regional Council's annual meeting each spring.

Upon ordination or commissioning, the minister's membership with his or her sponsoring community of faith is transferred to the Regional Council where he or she has been called. From that point on, the minister is never again a member of a community of faith; even after retirement, a minister is a member of Regional Council rather than a community of faith.

== Lay ministry ==
There are four types of lay ministers: licensed lay worship leader, designated lay minister (DLM), sacraments elders, and congregational designated minister (CDM). Lay ministers are not automatically licensed to administer the sacraments of baptism or Communion, but can apply to their Regional Council for the ability to do that. They are otherwise trained to lead worship, and in the case of DLMs and CDMs, can provide leadership and educational roles within a congregation.

Like ordered ministers, a designated lay minister (DLM) goes through a discernment process and, if recommended, then takes the three-year Designated Lay Ministry Program at St. Andrew's College in Saskatoon, and then must work for three years at a congregation that has been designated as a Supervised Ministry Education (SME) site. (Sandy-Saulteaux Spiritual Centre in Beausejour, Manitoba, offers an alternate path to recognized designated lay ministry for First Nations, Métis, and Inuit candidates.) Once qualified, the DLM is then appointed by the appropriate Regional Council to become a minister at a community of faith. The DLM can provide both worship and educational leadership, depending on the person's vocation and the congregation's needs. A DLM while active is a member of the Regional Council, not the congregation, but unlike ordered ministers, a DLM reverts to being a member of a congregation upon retirement.

Like a DLM, a congregational designated minister (CDM) is also a part of a community of faith's ministry team, but is a member of the community of faith who has been appointed to the task by his or her own community of faith. Unlike other ministers, a CDM always remains a member of the community of faith.

A licensed lay worship leader (LLWL) serves under the direction of the Regional Council and is available to lead worship at any congregation within the region. The LLWL undergoes whatever education is deemed necessary by the Regional Council, which is usually much less intensive than for ordered ministers or designated lay ministers. Unlike ordered clergy, the LLWL retains membership with the community of faith that recommended the individual.

A sacraments elder is a full member of a community of faith who is licensed by the Regional Council to administer the sacraments at his or her own community of faith. If the community of faith's minister is then absent, or the community of faith lacks a minister, this person is able to offer Communion and Baptism.

== Proposal for one order of ministry ==
At the 42nd General Council in 2015, a proposal was accepted that would see ordained ministers, diaconal ministers and Designated Lay Ministers combined into one order of ministry. Candidates for ministry would be able to choose one of the three educational paths now open to ordained, diaconal and DLMs, but regardless of education, all candidates would be ordained when they graduate and would be considered equal in every respect. Since this was considered a "denomination changing" proposal, it had to be approved by both a majority of congregations and a majority of presbyteries. However, the proposal failed to find the necessary approval at either level.
