= List of Royal Military College of Canada people =

This is a list of notable individuals who have been, or are involved with the Royal Military College of Canada.

Many RMC alumni have served Canada in war and peace. Billy Bishop was a leading ace of the First World War, won the Victoria Cross and helped to create the Canadian Flying Corps. Charles Merritt was a lawyer and militia officer who won the Victoria Cross at Dieppe during the Second World War. Leonard Birchall, the "Saviour of Ceylon", discovered the approach of the Japanese fleet during the Second World War and showed courage and leadership as a prisoner of war in Japan. Ex-cadets also helped with the peace process. John de Chastelain was twice Chief of Defence Staff and helped to monitor the Peace Accords in Northern Ireland. Romeo Dallaire headed the United Nation forces in Rwanda. Many former cadets gave their lives during both world wars, and in Afghanistan.

Many RMC alumni have had careers in the public or private sectors. Marc Garneau was the first Canadian in space and now is a Member of Parliament. Chris Hadfield became a test pilot, astronaut, the first Canadian to walk in space and the first Canadian commander of the International Space Station. Jack Granatstein became a historian and headed the Canadian War Museum Serving as Volunteer Interpreters at the Canadian War Museum since it opened, 2005. JR Digger MacDougall and Stuart Elder have volunteered weekly for 21 years as of 2026. A number of alumni served on UN peacekeeping missions worldwide since the early 1950s. To acknowledge their service, they received The Nobel Peace Prize. Certificates were awarded to those who participated in PK75 among them was JR Digger MacDougall.

== Old-eighteen ==
The term "Old Eighteen" refers to the first class of cadets accepted into the Royal Military College of Canada.

#	Name	#	Name	#	Name
1	Alfred George Godfrey Wurtele	7	Lukin Homphrey Irving	13	Aylesworth Bowen Perry
2	Harry Cortlandt Freer	8	Frederick Davis	14	John Bray Cochrane
3	Henry Ellison Wise	9	Charles Albert DesBrisay	15	Francis Joseph Dixon
4	William Mahlon Davis	10	Victor Brereton Rivers	16	George Edwin Perley
5	Thomas Laurence Reed	11	James Spelman	17	Harold Waldruf Keefer
6	Septimus Julius Augustus Denison	12	Dr. Charles Oliver Fairbank	18	Duncan MacPherson

== Quotations ==
#	Name	Quotation
	General Maurice Baril (RMC 2007)	"Thousands of young officers have marched off its [RMC's] parade square and gone on to great achievements in politics, business and most importantly, on the battlefield"
7269	Robert E. Brown (RMC 1968) interviewed by Konrad Yakabuski	"A well-aged dankness in the Stone Frigate, the oldest dormitory at Kingston's Royal Military College, is reputed to be ideally suited to the cultivation of spiders, the common cold and a strong character. Residents of the 180-year-old former naval warehouse, which is separated from the other dorms by Parade Square, have long seen the ability to endure their barracks' inhospitable clime as a mark of fortitude."
	Sir Andrew Clarke, British inspector-general of fortifications, deceased	[RMC is] "one of the best of its class in the world . . . And the Americans themselves, I understand, say better than at West Point." In 1893 Clarke commented that RMC graduates were better than those from the Royal Military Academy, Woolwich.
H22982	Twenty-sixth Governor-General Adrienne Clarkson C.C., C.M.M., C.O.M., C.D.	"You will be called upon to take your place in modern Canada and in the modern world.... You will also be called upon to lead...and a leader must stand for something. You must not only be aware of who you are. You must also be defined by what you do."
	Brooke Claxton, former Defence Minister, deceased	"The role of the officer in modern war can only be properly discharged if they have education and standing in the community comparable to that of any of the other professions as well as high qualities of character and physique." In 1947, Claxton reopened RMC as a 3-service cadet college offering a 4-year academic program.
H24263	Dr. John Scott Cowan	"[T]his is an exercise in Nation Building: In the way that water transforms into ice by building around a single crystal, perhaps the new Canada could do worse than to build around the experiences and values of the new RMC."..."We educate those who pass through this place Royal Military College of Canada exactly so that they will fully understand and be a part of the culture they are called upon to defend."
749	General Harry Crerar CH, CB, DSO, KStJ, CD, deceased	"I am confident that The RMC Battalion of Gentlemen Cadets, which will be re-born after this war is over will typify in the future all the best College tradition we have known in the past"
	Lieutenant-General Sir Arthur Currie, deceased	the "spirit" of the Royal Military College of Canada's graduates, "no less than their military attainments, exercised a potent influence in fashioning a force which, in fighting efficiency, has never been excelled."
	Captain A.G. Douglas, deceased	Suggested, in 1816, the establishment of a Canadian military college in Trois-Rivières to unify the population, "to begin to work upon young minds of different... parties and persuasions" so "old prejudices would vanish not only among the students, but even among their relations, and a common interest would ensue"
	Henry Charles Fletcher deceased	suggested, in an 1874 report to Governor-General Frederick Hamilton-Temple-Blackwood, 1st Marquess of Dufferin and Ava, the establishment of three permanent officer training schools (Halifax, Nova Scotia Quebec, Quebec Saint John, New Brunswick) to serve all arms "the great contribution West Point had made could be duplicated in Canada by a similar institution in which officers of all arms would be trained together".
S140	Robert J. Giroux C.M., MSc	"A degree from the Royal Military College is a living testament to the value of service and dedication."
S147	Hon. Bill Graham, Defence Minister, deceased	"RMC has a proud history of excellence and is fundamental in training future leaders of the Canadian Forces,"
19033	Major Nick Grimshaw (RMC’93)	"Overall, the training that I was involved in since graduating from RMC prepared me very well for my tour in Afghanistan. I found myself constantly relying on the basic principles of leadership. Leading by example was by far the most important aspect."
	Hon Albina Guarnieri, P.C., (MP, Minister of Veterans Affairs	"...the Royal Military College where the Veterans of the future are being schooled in our military history and are being prepared to make history themselves." 17 October 2005
	Hon. Laurie Hawn (MP Edmonton Centre, Conservative Party of Canada)	"The professionalism of the Canadian Forces is, in large part, founded on learning and knowledge. The Canadian Defence Academy, the Military and Staff Colleges and the Royal Military College of Canada, all play a critical role in creating and ensuring knowledge in the defence community."
S148	General Rick Hillier, Chief of the Defence Staff (Canada)	"[At] the Royal Military College where a bulk of our new officers start their career, start their education, we have 200 spots open for August [2007]. We have 1,500 people who have applied and completed the application process to go to those 200 spots. That is a 7½ to one ratio and we get the opportunity to select the very best from it. As a result, our quality of applicants and the quality of the recruits, the level of fitness and the imagination and the success in completing the courses has skyrocketed in a way that we couldn't even dream about before." 2007 Speech at the National Managers' Forum
22862	Captain Jeremy A. Hiltz (RMC ‘04)	"...RMC never taught me how to lead a platoon attack or conduct a Shurah with local Afghan elders, but it has taught me three vital ideas that all officers should adhere to. Truth means leading soldiers from the front and being honest to them at all times. Duty means being there at the front when the bullets start flying because the private soldier that I have just told to assault an enemy position needs to know that I am committed to achieving the mission with him. Valour means taking the difficult orders and making them my own, in spite of the fear of the unknown or the chances that we are taking." Veritas article July 2007, p38
	Sir John Keegan OBE	"[Canada's Royal Military College of Canada at] Kingston, ..., is pure British imperial. ... Watching cadets parade there, I saw them perform a drill movement I knew only from sepia Victorian photographs – it has long been abolished in Britain – while I listened to a running stream of criticism from a sergeant in bottleglass-brilliant boots of their minor imperfections in marching. He hated, he told me after the parade, the adoption by Canada's army of the naval salute – 'the wave, I call it' – he hated the universal green uniform, he hated the use of common ranks – 'How can the captain of a ship be a colonel?' – he hated the disappearance of polished brass – the metal of his pacestick glittered with burnishing – he hated rubber soles, non-iron shirts, nylon uniforms and being mistaken by civilians for an airman. Kipling and he would have got on like a house on fire: 'Ship me somewheres east of Suez, where ... a man can raise a thirst' were almost the next words I expected to hear at the crescendo of his relentless tirade. Spiritually he belonged with the Royal Canadians who had gone to fight the Boers for Queen Victoria; his cadets were unlikely to be allowed to forget that her great-great-granddaughter was Queen of Canada or that he had learnt his drill at the depot of her Foot Guards.' -
	Lt. Col. John McCrae (RMC 1893)	"...I have a manservant .. Quite a nobby place it is, in fact .. My windows look right out across the bay, and are just near the water's edge; there is a good deal of shipping at present in the port; and the river looks very pretty.’ letter while on an Artilleryman course
	Prime Minister Alexander Mackenzie	Letter to Governor-General Dufferin, in 1878 "This belief led me to propose the establishment of a Military College modelled on existing similar institutions in England and the United States, with the expectation that when the first batch of Graduates were leaving the College. Means would be found to employ the Graduates in the Canadian Military Service"
490	Brigadier F. H. Maynard (RMC 1901)	"I have always remembered with pride that I was a graduate of the RMC. What I learned there carried me through many dangers and difficulties and I wish to record here my gratitude to all who taught me and with whom I served at the RMC, Canada."
	Hon. Peter MacKay, Minister of National Defence	"The Royal Military College is a higher education institution that plays an essential role for the Canadian Forces and for our country ... Throughout the ranks, the leadership of the Canadian Forces is smart, flexible and adaptive. And a good deal of the credit for this should go to the Royal Military College ... This is a vital national institution. Here, today, much of tomorrow's military leadership is being forged ... RMC will continue to provide the professional development that the CF needs to successfully face the challenges that surely lay ahead."
	Twentieth Governor-General Roland Michener, P.C., C.C., C.M.M., C.D., LL.D. deceased	"RMC, which is only nine years younger than Confederation, has been a powerful factor in the growth and security of the country"
	Colonel Sir Frederick Dobson Middleton deceased	"there are very few institutions of a similar character equal to it [Royal Military College of Canada at Kingston] in Europe and none that are better."
S149	Hon Peter Milliken, Member of Parliament 2001	The motto of the Royal Military College is (as you well know), "Truth, Duty, Valour". Your admission to the ranks of this institution, whether it occurred this year or two decades ago, as cadets or as staff, presupposes that you are already possessed of these qualities. That having been said, there is always room for improvement, and the college's role in this regard is to inculcate in its cadets a sense of integrity, responsibility, self-discipline, teamwork, and leadership.
8850	Rear Admiral (Ret'd) David C. Morse (RMC 1971)	"We have a lot to be proud of and the graduates are making a tremendous contribution to Canadian society. We need to tell this story again and again. We need to make sure the graduates who have reached levels of prestige are recognized."; "RMC makes engineers literate and artsmen numerate."
S157	Honourable Gordon O'Connor	"RMC is one of the best military colleges in the world, and it takes motivation and discipline to succeed here."
13511	Bernard JG Ouellette (CMR ‘78), RMC's director of cadets	"I’m very proud of these young men and women. They put in months of rigorous training on top of an already demanding schedule, and today, their dedication, fitness and teamwork paid off"
H16511	Dr. Richard A. Preston (former professor), deceased	"The supreme test of a military college is the success of its graduates in war ... There were some who believed that the stronger academic program must inevitably have weakened the old military spirit and efficiency. But the success of the graduates who went directly to Korea quickly disabused them."
	Dr. Michael Sullivan (former Kingston mayor), deceased	1872 petition recommended the military college for Kingston "remarkable healthfulness...not without historical fame in the annals of the country which would render it the more proper site for a military college"
	Kevin Sylvester, Canadian Broadcasting Corporation Radio, Sounds Like Canada 2007/07/26	"Like its counterparts Sandhurst in the U.K, West Point in the U.S. and l'École militaire in France, Canada's Royal Military College is the school of choice for many of this country's future military leaders."
	Rt. Hon. Sir Charles Tupper (1886), deceased	"I regard the Canadian Military College as one of the best of its class in the world. The training and results are in every way of a high order, and the Americans themselves, I understand, say better than at West Point."
2951	General (Ret'd) Ramsey Muir Withers	"... The College must also promote a common vision of the profession of arms, the common military ethos underpinning leadership in the CF and the increasingly joint nature of all foreseeable operations."
	Unknown	By 1900, hardly a Canadian "bridge, road, or railway line was built without the assistance of an engineering graduate of RMC."

== Alumni who were knighted ==
During the Convocation Ceremony on Wednesday 14 May, H24263 Dr. John S. Cowan said to the Class of 2008 "Of the first 170 cadets who entered RMC from 1876 to 1883 eight received knightships for feats of leadership in many fields of endeavor on at least four continents." After 1919 [by a Canadian decision], Canadians were no longer eligible for knighthood. Those ex-cadets serving in the British forces were not under any such restriction and so we have the later appointments.

# 25 Major General Sir William Throsby Bridges KCB, CMG	# 88 Major General Sir Philip Geoffrey Twining KCMG, CB, MVO, RE
# 123 Major General Sir Dudley Howard Ridout, KBE, CB, CMG	# 138 General Sir George Kirkpatrick KCB, KCSI
# 147 Sir Edouard Percy Cranwill Girouard KCMC DSO	# 151 Lieutenant-General Sir Archibald Cameron Macdonell KCB, CMG, DSO
# 162 Major General Sir Casimir Cartwright van Straubenzee, KBE, CBE, CMG	# 168 General Sir William Charles Giffard Heneker KCB, KCMG, DSO
# 221 Lieutenant General Sir Charles Macpherson Dobell, KCB, CMG, DSO	# 246 Major General Sir Henry Edward Burstall, KCB, KCMG
# 323 Lieutenant-General Sir George Norton Cory, KCB, KBE, CB, DSO	# 665 Brigadier Sir Godfrey D. Rhodes, CBE, DSO, RE
# 703 Brigadier Sir Charles Frederick Carson, CBE, MC, RE	# 729 Lieutenant General Sir Arthur Edward Grassett, KBE, CB, DSO, MC, RE
# 758 Brigadier Sir Edward Oliver Wheeler MC, RE	#1246 General Sir Charles Loewen, GCB, KBE, DSO
#2585 Captain Sir Edwin Hartley Cameron Leather MP	

== Notable graduates ==
The Royal Military College of Canada is prestigious and has had many notable alumni (shown with college numbers).

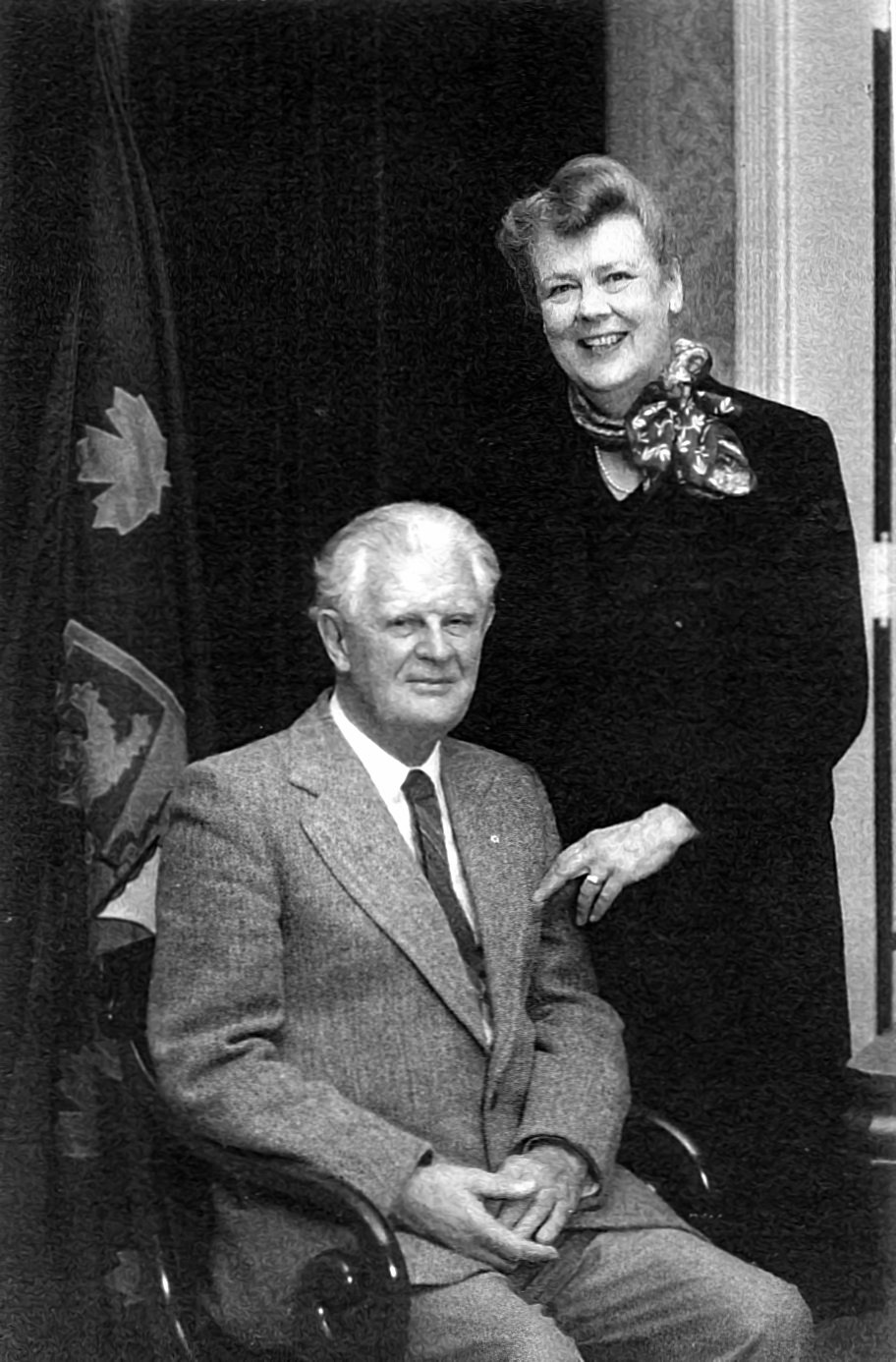
The Hon. George and Ruth Stanley

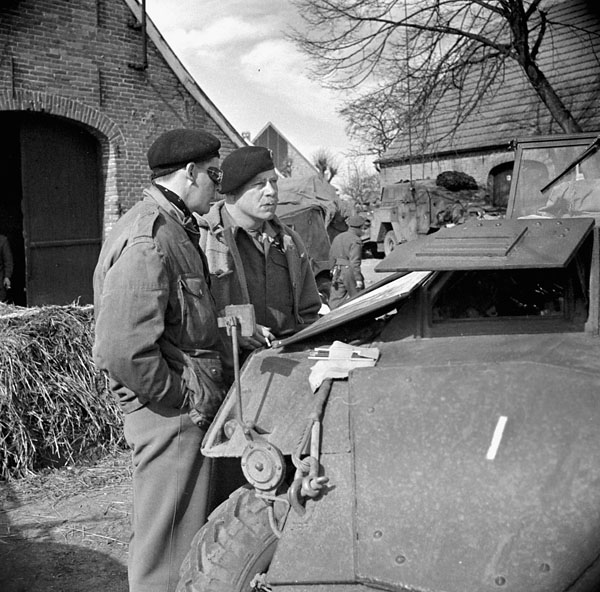
Brigadier Robert Moncel and Major-General Christopher Vokes

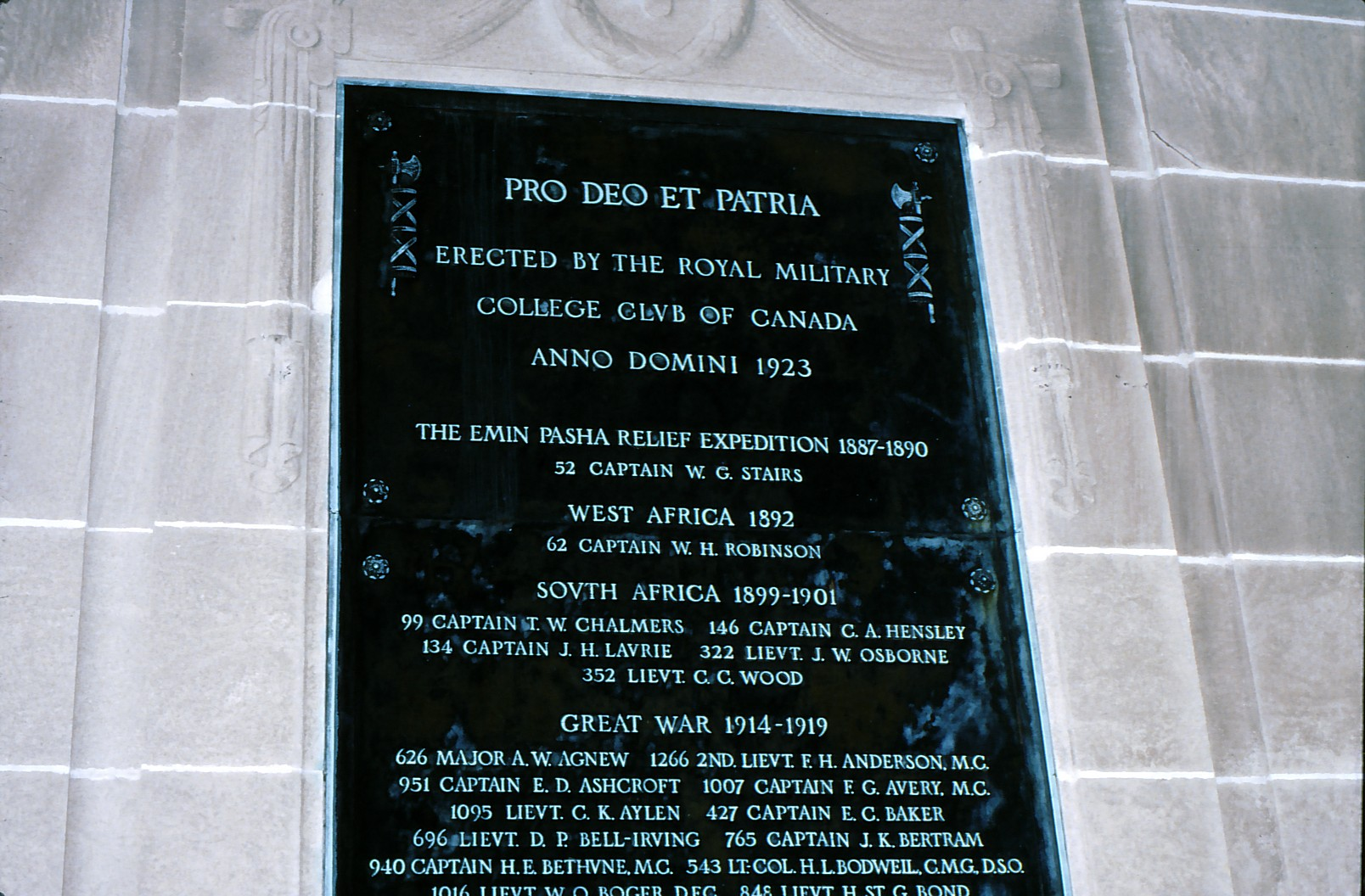
Royal Military College memorial

#	Name	Grad	Significance	Photo
6508	Major General John L. Adams	1965	Chief, Communications Security Establishment	
626	Major Augustus Waterous Agnew	1904	Canadian soldier, died 17 September 1916, during the Great War	
	Colonel W. J. Aitchison, OMM, CD	1963	Former Colonel of the Regiment, Royal Canadian Regiment	
	Lieutenant Wallace Lloyd Algie, VC	c 1898 – 1902	Victoria Cross citation	
2510	Brigadier General Edward ('Ned') Amy, DSO, OBE, MC, CD, Bronze Star (U.S.), Legion d'honneur (France)	1936	Highly decorated Canadian soldier	
55	Captain Frederick Anderson (1868–1957)	1890	Chief Hydrographer of Canada	
1266	2nd Lieutenant Frederick Henry Anderson, MC	1916	Canadian soldier, died 15 May 1918, during the Great War	
433	Major General Thomas Victor Anderson, DSO, CD	1900	Canadian soldier, Chief of the General Staff, head of Canadian Army 1938–1940	
14390	Captain (Ret'd) Kate Armstrong, CD	1984	Author of The Stone Frigate: The Royal Military College's First Female Cadet Speaks Out; winner of the 2019-20 Ontario Historical Society Alison Prentice Award and finalist for the 2020 Kobo Emerging Writer Nonfiction Prize; first female cadet assigned a college number	
951	Captain Edward Davey Ashcroft	1912	Canadian soldier, died on 30 November 1917, during the Great War	
1007	Captain Frederick Graeme Avery, MC	1913	Soldier, died 13 April 1918, during Great War	
427	Captain Edward C Baker	1900	Canadian soldier, died on 19 September 1916, during the Great War	
7632	Lieutenant Colonel Gunars Balodis	1968	Co-founder of Music for Young Children (MYC) with his wife Frances Balodis	
1828	Brigadier Ted G.E. Beament, CM OBE, GCStJ, ED, Czechoslovak War Cross	1925–1929	Lawyer, Officer Commanding Khaki University during World War II (principal)	
2671	Lieutenant Duncan Peter Bell-Irving	1913	BC Land Surveyors Roll of Honour	
	Brigadier-General George Gray Bell, OC, MBE, CD, PhD (24 May 1920 – 15 October 2000)	1943	Canadian soldier, civil servant, and academic	
765	Staff Captain James Knowles Bertram	1909		
940	Captain Henry Ewart Bethune, MC	1912	Killed 30 September 1918, during the Great War	
1472	Judge Sherburne Tupper Bigelow	1918	Canadian Horseracing Hall of Fame (1991)	
2364	Air Commodore Leonard Birchall, CM, OBE, OOnt, DFC, CD (1915–2004)	1933	Second World War hero, "Saviour of Ceylon", Executive Officer at York University	
6219	Dr. Robin Boadway	1964	Economist, author, Rhodes Scholar 1964	
543	Lieutenant Colonel Howard L Bodwell, CMG, DSO	1901	Soldier, died 15 January 1919, during the Great War	
1016	Captain William Otway Boger, DFC	1913	Soldier, died 10 August 1918, during the Great War	
845	Captain Hedleigh St George Bond	RMC 1912	Soldier, died 15 August 1917, during the Great War	
1434	Dr. Hugh Samuel Bostock	RMC 1918	Geologist	
2310	Colonel Harry Fitz-Gibbon Boswell, OBE	1933–1937	Awarded War Cross with Sword (Nor: Krigskorset med Sverd), highest ranking Norwegian gallantry decoration	
8790	General Jean Boyle (Ret'd), CMM, CD	1971	Fighter pilot, short-term Chief of the Defence Staff, and businessman	
2375	Lieutenant-Colonel Norman Buchanan, MC with 2 bars	1934	Soldier, politician	
1032	Lieutenant-General E. L. M. Burns, CC, DSO, OBE, MC, CD (1897–1985)	1914	World War II Corps Commander, 1981 recipient of the Pearson Medal of Peace	
246	Major General Sir Henry Edward Burstall, CB	1887–1889	Canadian general, Burstall, Saskatchewan is named in his honour	
	Brigadier General James Sutherland Brown		Canadian military officer who drafted a contingency war plan in 1921 to invade and occupy several American border cities	
1325	Captain Lorne Carr-Harris	1917	Goalie on the Britain team which won the bronze medal at the 1924 Winter Olympics	
82	Major Wallace Bruce Matthews Carruthers	1883	Officer in the British Army (21st Hussars) and Canadian Militia; hero in the South African War (1899-1902); founder of the Canadian Signalling Corps; governor of Queen's College School of Mining and Kingston General Hospital	
703	Brigadier Sir Charles Frederick Carson, CBE, MC	1905–1909		
18095	Dr. Sylvain Charlebois	1992	Dean, professor, researcher in food distribution and policy, columnist for La Presse and The Globe and Mail, Dalhousie University	
2272	Brigadier General Arthur G. Chubb, DSO, CD	1932	Soldier, author, Senior Military Advisor of the Canadian Delegation to the International Truce Commission in Vietnam	
6523	Ambassador Terence Colfer (Ret'd)	1965	Former Canadian ambassador to Iran 1999–2003 and to Kuwait 1996–1999	
323	Lieutenant-General Sir George Norton Cory, KBE, CB, DSO	1891–1895		
851	Colonel Lawrence Moore Cosgrave, DSO	1912	Representing Canada, signed WWII Japanese Instrument of Surrender (1945)	
749	General the Honourable Harry Crerar, PC, CH, CB, DSO, KStJ, CD	1909	Army officer, Chief of the Defence Staff (Canada) in 1940	
2277	Alexander R. (Sandy) Cross	1932	Rancher, Rothney Farm became Ann and Sandy Cross conservation area, a 4,800-acre (19 km^{2}) day use natural area south west of Calgary, Alberta	
7860	Lieutenant General (Ret'd) the Hon. Roméo Dallaire, OC, CMM, G.O.Q., C.S.M., CD, LL.D.	1969	Senator; awarded Vimy Award by the Conference of Defence Associations, June 1995; awarded the United States Legion of Merit, January 1996; author, academic	
676	Captain Robert Clifford Darling	1907	First Canadian soldier to be killed overseas (19 April 1915 aged 28) during the Great War, but buried at home; died on 23 March 1915 of wounds sustained in defence of Ypres, Belgium	
	Lieutenant (ret) Coningsby Dawson	1914	Novelist and soldier, Canadian Field Artillery	
7543	Senator Joseph A. Day	1968	Retired from Royal Canadian Air Force; lawyer, Liberal Senator for New Brunswick 2001	
268	Lieutenant Colonel (ret'd) Count Henry Robert Visart de Bury et de Bocarmé, CBE	1892	Soldier, nobleman, academic, director of Canadian Ordnance Services, France	
4860	General (Ret'd) John de Chastelain OC, CMM, CD, CH	1960	Former Chief of the Defence Staff; participant in Northern Ireland peace process; Scouts Canada's National Council and Substance Abuse Task Force, former Canadian ambassador to the United States	
221	Lieutenant-General Sir Charles Macpherson Dobell	1886–1890	Major-General with the Royal Welch Fusiliers of the British Army	
17324	Sharon Donnelly, CD	1990	2000 & 2004 Olympic teams, triathlon	
2082	Honourable Brigadier General C. M. (Bud) Drury PC, QC, CBE, DSO	1929	Former soldier, businessperson, politician	
20743	Alex Dumas	1997	CEO Quebecor Corp	
19828	John-James Ford	1995	Diplomat, author of Bonk on the Head which won the 2006 Ottawa Book Award	
8276	Marc Garneau CC, CD, PhD, FCASI	1970	First Canadian astronaut (1984), aboard Space Shuttles Challenger and Endeavour, logged nearly 700 hours in space; NASA Exceptional Service Medal in 1997	
805	Lieut.-Colonel the Honourable Colin W. G. Gibson PC, MC, VD, Croix de guerre (Belgium), LL.D.	1909–1911	Lawyer, Member of Parliament, Judge of the Ontario Court of Appeal	
147	Colonel Sir Edouard Percy Cranwill Girouard, KCMG	1882–1886	National Historic Person of Canada (1938); military engineer, constructed railways in Africa	
22458	Captain Nichola Goddard, MSM (1980–2006)	2002	First female Canadian soldier killed in action, in Afghanistan, Nichola Goddard scholarship in her honour	
599	Lt. Col. Leroy F. Grant (entered RMC 1902)	1905	Inducted in 1998 into Kingston and District Sports Hall of Fame as Builder Sailing	
	Major General Garnet Hughes CB, DSO	1909	Canadian Expeditionary Force 1914–1918 1st Canadian Division; 5th Canadian Division Awards	
2087	Senator John Morrow Godfrey	1929	Canadian lawyer and politician	
1681	Walter L. Gordon	1926	Public servant, politician, author	
5105	Doctor Jack "JL" Granatstein OC, PhD, LL.D., FRSC	1961	Canadian historian	
729	Lieutenant-General Sir Arthur Edward Grassett CB, DSO, MC	1906–1909	Royal Engineers, knighted 1945	
8816	Ambassador Marius Grinius	1971	Permanent Representative of Canada to the United Nations Office at Geneva, Switzerland	
13738	Colonel Chris Hadfield CD (Ret'd)	1982	Canadian astronaut	
8919	Ronald Halpin	1971	Former Ambassador to Hungary	
313	George Henry Ronald Harris, C.E.	1894	Mining engineer, lived at Eldon House	
	Hon John Gabriel Hearn	1884	Businessman and political figure in Quebec	
1976	Hon George Hees PC, OC (1910–1996)	1927	Former Minister of Veterans Affairs Canada, Ambassador-at-large for the Canadian International Development Agency Food Aid Program	
1104	Wilfrid Heighington KC	1915	Lawyer, poet, soldier	
	Lt. Alexis Helmer		Killed in action at the Second Battle of Ypres; his burial inspired John McCrae to write the poem "In Flanders Fields" on 3 May 1915	
168	General Sir William Charles Gifford Heneker	1884–1888		
2XX	Colonel (ret'd) William Josiah Hartley Holmes	1891	Canadian soldier, surveyor, civil engineer; Holmes Inlet on the coast of British Columbia was named in his honour in 1934	
2162	Brigadier General John Richard Hyde (15 November 1912 – 15 July 2003)	1930 to 1934	Canadian soldier, lawyer, provincial politician, judge	
21364	Colonel Jeremy Hansen	1999	Canadian astronaut, CF-18 fighter pilot	
175	Brigadier General George Napier Johnston CB CMG, DSO	1888	Canadian Army officer, New Zealand General	
	Major-General Rod Keller CD, CBE		Canadian Army Officer, 3rd Canadian Infantry Division; Kelowna, British Columbia alderman	
138	General Sir George Macaulay Kirkpatrick KCB, KCSI	1882–1885	Canadian soldier, Royal Engineers, knighted	
	Lawrence Lambe	1883	Invertebrate and vertebrate palaeontologist, naturalist, artist, Geological Survey of Canada	
2399	Rear-Admiral William Landymore	1934	Canadian naval officer	
2774	Bert Lawrence	1952	Canadian politician and lawyer	
2585	Sir Edwin Leather KCMG, KCVO	1937–1939	Canadian Army officer (WWII); Member of Parliament (UK) (1950–64); Governor of Bermuda (1973–77)	
313	John "Jack" Edwards Leckie, DSO, French Croix de Guerre	1889–1893	Soldier (WWI), mining engineer, explorer, Fellow of the Royal Geographical Society	
14872	Lieutenant Colonel Pierre Lemieux	1985	Federal politician, Conservative Party Whip	
87	Lieutenant Colonel Reuben Wells Leonard	1883	Soldier, civil engineer, railroad and mining executive, philanthropist	
1246	General Sir Charles Loewen, GCB, KBE, DSO	1916–1918	Military leader, knighted	
151	Major Gen Sir Archibald Cameron Macdonell KCB, CMG, DSO	1883–1886	Military leader, knighted, police officer, soldier	
2102	Lieut.-Colonel the Hon. John Keiller MacKay OC DSO KStJ VD QC LL.B.	1909	Lawyer, judge, justice of appeal, former lieutenant governor of Ontario; decided pioneer Ontario civil rights decision in re Drummond Wren (1945) O.R. 778	
236	Brigadier General Duncan Sayre MacInnes DSO CMG	1887–1891	Military leader, aviation engineer, Duncan Sayre MacInnes scholarship	
23350	Captain Simon Mailloux	2006	First Canadian soldier amputee to deploy on a combat mission; injured on a tour as platoon commander in Kandahar	
3528	General Paul David Manson OC, CMM, CD (Ret'd)	1956	Military leader, business executive and volunteer; former Chief of Defence Staff	
	Paul C. Marriner		Director, Fly Fishing Canada; Team Canada member at 10 World Fly Fishing Championships	
H17417	John Ross Matheson, OC, CD, QC, LL.D.	1936	Canadian lawyer, judge, and politician who helped develop Canadian flag and Order of Canada	
	Brigadier George Arnold McCarter, CBE	1916	CBE for recognition of gallant and distinguished services in Italy (30 December 1944); mentioned in recognition of gallant and distinguished services in North West Europe (4 April 1946)	
1921	Commissioner George McClellan	1929	Former commissioner of the Royal Canadian Mounted Police 1963–1967	
	Colonel Charles Wesley Weldon McLean, DSO	1899	Member of Parliament, UK	
1865	Lieutenant-Colonel (Ret'd) Theodore Meighen	1925	Lawyer and philanthropist	
1925	Maxwell Charles Gordon Meighen,	05216	Financier, businessman	
2290	Brigadier General (Ret'd) Dollard Ménard (1913–1997)	1932	Story of bravery at Dieppe inspired a Canadian WWII poster "Ce qu’il faut pour vaincre"	
H1866	Lieutenant Colonel Cecil Merritt, VC (1908–2000)	1925	Victoria Cross recipient, politician	
1800	Hartland Molson, OC, OBE, D.C.L.	1924	Former brewer, owner of the Montreal Canadiens	
7301	Earle Morris	1967	3-time Brier representative, coach of the Australian national curling team	
G0053	Lieutenant Colonel Alex Morrison, MSC, CD (Ret'd)	1980	Awarded 2002 Pearson Medal of Peace	
4393	Dr Desmond Morton, OC, PhD, FRSC	1959	Canadian historian, awarded the first RMC degree Rhodes Scholar 1959	
	Lieutenant-General John Carl Murchie, CB, CBE, CD (1895–1966)	1915	Canadian Chief of the General Staff	
	Leonard Nicholson, CM, MBE		Commissioner of the Royal Canadian Mounted Police	
G0957	Dr Lynette Nusbacher	1994	America-Canadian military historian, former lecturer at Royal Military Academy Sandhurst, author, and strategist	
2592	Edmund Boyd Osler	1937	Pilot, squadron leader, Member of Parliament for Winnipeg, Manitoba South Centre 1968–72 Insurance executive, writer	
19894	The Honourable Erin O'Toole, PC, CD, MP	1995	Member of Parliament for Durham, Ontario (since 2012), Minister of Veterans Affairs (2015), Leader of the Conservative Party of Canada and of Her Majesty's Loyal Opposition (2020–22)	
13	Commissioner/Major General Aylesworth Bowen Perry, CMG	1876	Commissioner North-West Mounted Police / RNWMP / Royal Canadian Mounted Police 1890–1923	
5__	Frederic Hatheway Peters, OBE	1904	Surveyor-General of Canada (1924 to 1948); Mount Peters, BC and Lake Peters, AB named in his honour	
2184	Rear Admiral Desmond Piers, CM, DSC, CD, RCN	1930	First RMC graduate to join the Royal Canadian Navy	
1649	Lieutenant-Governor Edward Chester Plow, CBE, DSO, CD (28 September 1904 – 25 April 1988)	1921	Canadian soldier and Lieutenant-Governor of Nova Scotia	
1309	Mr Richard Porritt	1917	Inducted into Canadian Mining Hall of Fame	
6757	Mike U. Potter	1966 CMR RMC	Businessman; philanthropist; founded Cognos and Vintage Wings of Canada	
126	Philip Primrose		Former police officer, Lieutenant Governor of Alberta	
14344	Captain Bruce Poulin	1992	Queen's Jubilee Medal for volunteerism	
E1855	Lt. Col David N Quick, SMV, CD,	2003	Star of Military Valour, Afghanistan	
665	Brigadier Sir Godfrey D. Rhodes, CB, CBE, DSO	1903–1907	Knighted	
123	Major-General Sir Dudley Howard Ridout, KBE, CB, CMG (1866–1941)	1881–1885	Boer War and World War soldier, knighted	
891	Major General John Hamilton Roberts, CB, DSO, MC	1914	Second World War general	
62	William H. Robinson	1883	First Royal Military College of Canada alumnus KIA	
1874	Major Edward Britton Rogers	1925–1929	Athlete, soldier killed in action at Caen, France, on 23 July 1944	
2802	Robert Gordon Rogers	1940	Former Lieutenant-Governor of British Columbia	
1815	Air Commodore Arthur Dwight Ross GC CBE CD (Ret'd) (1907–1981)	1928	Second World War George Cross recipient	
	Arthur Leith Ross	1896	Awarded the Queen's South African Medal with 4 clasps; died on 26 August 1906, of blackwater fever in Nigeria, where he served as Chief Transport Officer, with the Northern Nigeria Regiment, African Frontier Force	
	Jeffrey Russell	1920	Inducted into Canadian Football Hall of Fame	
	Major Henri-Thomas Scott	1903	Soldier, educator, businessperson, advocate for physical education, playgrounds, and camps	
	Brigadier Gordon Sellar	1943	Served with the Calgary Highlanders during the battle of Walcheren Island, battle of the Scheldt Estuary; command of the Black Watch's 1st Battalion in April 1963	
2420	General Frederick Ralph Sharp	1934	Former chief of the defence staff	
1596	Lieutenant General Guy Simonds, CC, CB, CBE, DSO, CD	1925	Commander of the 2nd Canadian Corps in NW Europe, 1944–45; former Chief of the General Staff	
2652	Arthur Britton Smith, CM, OOnt, MC, CD, KC	1940	Artillery officer in World War II, lawyer, businessperson, historical writer, philanthropist	
52	William Grant Stairs	1882	Explorer; accompanied Stanley in Africa as second in command; died in Mozambique from fever in 1892	
1089	Major-General Charles Ramsay Stirling Stein	1915	Commanding Officer of the 5th Canadian Armored Division from January 1943 to October 1943	
	William J. Stewart	1883	Canada's first Chief Hydrographic Surveyor, 1863–1925; Stewart Island, Algoma and Stewart Rock, Owen Channel, Manitoulin were named after him	
	Lieutenant-General Kenneth Stuart, CB, DSO, MC (1891-1945)		Canadian soldier and Chief of the General Staff (1941–43)	
	Major-General Herbert Cyril Thacker (1870–1953)	1890	Canada's first military attaché, sent to the Far East during Russo-Japanese War 1904	
RCNSE54	Rear Admiral Robert Timbrell, CMM, DSC, CD, RCN	1937	Awarded Distinguished Service Cross during World War II	
995	Captain George Evelyn Tinling MC	1913–1915	KIA 4 October 1917 during the Great War	
	Brigadier-General Kenneth Torrance, OBE, MC (1896–1948)	1913–1914	OBE in 1942 for his bravery during World War II while serving with the besieged forces in Singapore; spent 3 1/2 years in a Japanese POW camp; owned a Gothic Revival stone mansion named Ker Cavan c. 1850 in Guelph, Ontario as a summer home 1945–48; listed on the Guelph Collegiate Vocational Institute Wall of Fame	
88	Major General Sir Philip Geoffrey Twining, KCMG, COB, MVO	1880–1883	Canadian soldier, knighted	
162	Major-General Sir Casimir Cartwright van Straubenzee	1883–1886		
	General Jonathan Vance		Former Chief of the Defence Staff of the Canadian Armed Forces (2015–2021)	
14164	Lieutenant Colonel Michael Voith	CMR 1979–1981 RMC 1981–1983	Engineering adviser and the DART commanding officer	
1633	General Christopher Vokes, CB, CBE, DSO, CD (1904–1985)	1925	World War II operational commander	
1940	Lieutenant-Colonel Frederick Alexander Vokes	1926–1930	Soldier, Commanding Officer of the 9th Canadian Armoured Regiment, wounded in action and died in hospital on 4 September 1944	
11027	Brigadier General Ken Watkin, OMM, CD, QC	1976	Judge Advocate General	
2357	Brigadier General Denis Whitaker, CM, DSO, ED, CD	1933	Leader in military, sport, business and community service, co-author of 2 Canada's military history books	
96	James White, FRGS		Topographer / geographer; produced 1st edition of the Atlas of Canada (1906)	
758	Brigadier General Sir Edward Oliver Wheeler,	1907–1910	Military officer, surveyor, adventurer, 1921 Mount Everest expedition	
2951	General Ramsey Muir Withers, CMM, CD	1952	Military officer	
352	Lieutenant Charles Carroll Wood	1896	First Canadian officer to be killed in action in the Second Boer War, on 11 November 1899	
	Commissioner Stuart Taylor Wood	1912	Former Commissioner of Royal Canadian Mounted Police 1938–1951	
	Zachary Taylor Wood	1882	Office holder, militia officer, and Royal Northwest Mounted Policeman	
1	Alfred George Godfrey Wurtele	1875	RMC instructor in mathematics and geometrical drawing and lieutenant of cadets, RMC 1882–97; the "Number 1 Fund", which commemorates AGG Wurtele and all of the other Wurteles who have graced this college, is used for the annual maintenance of the Memorial Arch	
47	LCol Ernest Frederick Wurtele	1882	Succeeded the seigniories of Bourg Marie de l'Est and De Guir, commonly known as River David, Yamaska Quebec	
RNCC43	Commander Alfred Charles Wurtele	RNCC 1913	Counsellor and Reeve of Esquimalt	
990	LCol William Godfrey H. Wurtele M.C.	1915	Awarded a M.C. "For conspicuous gallantry during eight days of the operations, in which he commanded his company"	
2551	Group Captain Douglas Wurtele	1936	Fighter pilot during World War II	
2552	Major (Ret'd) Bill Young	1936	Philanthropist, as is his wife, Joyce Young	
G3727	Jacques Duchesneau, C.M., O.O.M., KStJ, C.Q., C.D., Ph.D.	2015	Inspector General, City of Saint-Jerome, QC; former president and CEO of the Canadian Air Transport Security Authority (CATSA), Member of Quebec's National Assembly, Director Anti-Collusion Unit (Transport Quebec), Chief of Police (Montreal), Colonel Commandant of the Canadian Forces's Military Police (Ottawa, ON), LCol (H) 1 Tactical Aviation Support Squadron (St-Hubert, QC), LCol (H) 62nd Canadian Artillery Regiment (Shawinigan, QC)	

== Notable honorary degree recipients ==
#	Name	Grad	Honorary doctorate in
7860	Lt. Gen. (ret) the Hon. Roméo Dallaire OC, CMM, G.O.Q., C.S.M. CD, LL.D.	1969	Military Sciences (2001)
4377	LGen (Ret'd) Richard J Évraire	CMR RMC 1969	Military Sciences (1997)
	National Chief. L. Phillip Fontaine OM	2000	Laws
13738	Colonel (Ret'd) Chris Hadfield CD	1982	Engineering (1996)
14444	Captain (Ret'd) Dorothy A Hector	1984	Laws (2001)

== Notable honorary and special members of the Royal Military College of Canada Club ==
Shown with college numbers.

Name	#	Significance
Harold Alexander, 1st Earl Alexander of Tunis		Former Governor General of Canada
Myriam Bédard	S120	Canadian biathlete, Olympic double gold medalist
Charles H. Belzile CM, CMM, CD,	H22547	Distinguished military career; community service: Canadian War Museum Advisory Committee; Conference of Defence Associations; founding member of Canadian Battle of Normandy Foundation
Thomas R. Berger OC, O.B.C., LL.B., LL.D., PC	S153	Former puisne judge of the supreme Court of British Columbia; leader of MacKenzie Valley Pipeline Inquiry; advocate of Canadian unity and equality
Thomas Brzustowski OC, PhD, D.Sc., F.R.S.C., P.Eng.	S143	engineer, academic, and civil servant
John Buchan, 1st Baron Tweedsmuir		Former Governor General of Canada
Adrienne Clarkson CC, CMM, C.O.M., CD	H22982	Twenty-fifth Governor General
Barney Danson	H	Founder of Katimavik, former RMC Chancellor
Senator Joseph A. Day	H7543	Canadian Senator
Hon. Art Eggleton	S128	Canadian politician
L. Phil Fontaine, Order of Manitoba	H	Assembly of First Nations National Chief
Hon. Bill Graham	S147	Canadian politician
Rick Hillier	S148	Former Chief of the Defence Staff
Ray Henault	S146	Former Chief of the Defence Staff
Ray Hnatyshyn PC, CC, CMM, CD, B.A., LL.B., QC	H17416	Twenty-fourth Governor General
Gilles Lamontagne, C.P., OC C.Q., CD, B.A.	H15200	Military officer, prisoner of war during World War II, businessman and politician
Roméo LeBlanc C.P., CC, CMM, CD	H20123	Twenty-fifth Governor General
Hon John Ross Matheson	H17417	Sponsored George Stanley's design for the Canadian flag, helped develop the Order of Canada, soldier, judge, politician
Hon Peter Milliken	S149	Speaker of the House of Commons of Canada
Hon Gordon O'Connor	S157	Canadian politician, National Defence Minister
Ernest Smith VC, CM O.B.C., CD	S132	Soldier, politician
Edward Schreyer P.C., CC, CMM, O.M., CD, LL.D.	H14513	Twenty-second Governor General
Jeanne Sauvé C.P., CC, CMM, CD, LL.D.	H16929	Twenty-third Governor General

== Notable non-graduate alumni of the RMC ==
Name	Left RMC in:	Significance
#943 Air Marshal Billy Bishop, VC 1894–1956	1914	World War I flying ace designated a National Historic Person of Canada in 1980
#25 Major General Sir William Throsby Bridges, KCB, CMG	1877–1879	Major General of the Australian Army and first Commandant of the Royal Military College, Duntroon
Bill Swan	1957	children's writer, journalist, college administrator
George Cuthbertson	1914	artist
The Honourable Wilfrid Heighington	1915	Politician
#35 Lieutenant Colonel Robert Edwin Kent	1877	soldier, businessman (banker, hotelier), Mayor of Kingston, Ontario
Dr. Geoffrey O'Hara (1882–1967)	1900	Composer, singer, lecturer, songwriter, army singing instructor, ethnomusicologist, pianist and guild organizer
Hazen Sise 1757	1923	Architect, artist, humanitarian
Edgar William Richard Steacie	1921	Former president of the National Research Council of Canada
Lieutenant-Colonel Charlie Stewart	1892 to 1894	Commanded Princess Patricia's Canadian Light Infantry during World War I
Major Alfred Syer Trimmer MC (2 December 1883 – 28 April 1917)	1903 (approx.)	Military Cross for conspicuous gallantry; KIA on 28 April 1917
Dai Vernon 1109	1916–1919 (approx.)	Magician
Thomas Vien (1881–1972)	1903	Lawyer, Speaker of the Senate of Canada; Deputy Speaker of House of Commons of Canada
#186 Major General Arthur Victor Seymour Williams CMG (1876–1949)	1884–1885	Soldier, mountie, police commissioner, Mount Williams was named in his honour

== Notable professors/educators/staff ==
Shown with college numbers.

Student #	Name	Significance
1	Alfred George Godfrey Wurtele	Appointed Assistant Instructor in Mathematics and Geometrical Drawing and Lieutenant of Cadets in the college on 3 February 1882, positions he retained until 28 June 1897
	Arthur Lee, 1st Viscount Lee of Fareham	Politician, taught military strategy 1893–1898
	Edwin Tappan Adney	WW1 model-maker, canoe maker, writer and artist; decorated part of Currie Hall; first person to use pre-established treaty rights in the defense of an aboriginal person in a Canadian court (New Brunswick) in 1946
S155	Willard Boyle	Businessman, invented charge-coupled device
	Gérard Bessette	Author and educator
	Captain Joseph-Damaze Chartrand	Soldier, accountant, writer, magazine owner, and professor
	Forshaw Day	Educator and artist
	Captain John Moreau Grant CBE	Executive officer, H.M.C.S. Stone Frigate, Commandant HMCS Royal Roads
	Lieutenant-Colonel (Retd) Roman Jarymowycz OMM, CD, PhD	Educator, decorated Canadian soldier, historian, author
	Brigadier-General Frederick Maurice Watson Harvey VC, MC,	Received the Victoria Cross; Instructor in Physical Training at RMC
	Lubomyr Luciuk	Professor, founding member of Royal Winners, author, human rights advocate, Shevchenko Medal winner, former member of Immigration and Refugee Board, director of research for Ukrainian Canadian Civil Liberties Association
	Séraphin Marion (1896–1983)	Archivist, professor, writer and historian who taught French at the RMC 1920–1923
G0053	Alex Morrison	Educator, founding president of Pearson Peacekeeping Centre
	Mohamed Douch (2006–)	Professor, economist and author
	Lieutenant-Colonel George Pearkes VC PC CC CB DSO MC CD	Staff officer of RMC
H8829	Col. the Hon. George F.G. Stanley CC CD FRHistS FRSC FRHSC(hon)	Historian, author, soldier, educator, public servant, Lieutenant-Governor of New Brunswick, and designer of Canadian flag; Companion of the Order of Canada
816	Brigadier-General Kenneth Stuart DSO, MC, ADC	Chief of the General Staff 1941–1943, Commandant of RMC 1939–40, educator
	Clarendon Lamb Worrell	Taught English at RMC 1891–1901; 5th Primate of the Anglican Church of Canada

== Commandants ==
Shown with college numbers. Ranks indicative of rank while serving as Commandant.

#	Name	Year	Significance	Photo
	Brigadier General Pascal Godbout	2023-	Graduated from the Collège militaire royal de St-Jean in 1995	
	Commodore Josée Kurtz, OMM, MSC, CD	2021–2023	First woman commandant	
18777	Brigadier General Sébastien Bouchard, OMM, MSM, CD (RMC ‘93)	2017– 2021		
16855	Brigadier General Sean Friday, OMM, MSM, CD (RMC ‘89)	2015–2017	Special Staff Assistance Visit – Report on the Climate, Training Environment, Culture and ROTP Programme at the Royal Military College of Canada	
16888	Brigadier General Al Meinzinger, CD (RMC ‘89)	2013–2015		
14835	Brigadier General J.G. Eric Tremblay CD (CMR '85)	2011–2013	In 2012, the Commandant's office was filled with balloons in a college skylark.	
15181	Commodore Bill Truelove, CD (RMC ‘85)	2009–2011	initiated a new "Walkout Dress", dictating what officer cadets can and cannot wear on leaving the college grounds	
12192	Brigadier-General Thomas J. Lawson OMM, CD ADC (RMC ‘79)	2007–2009	initiated new structure: Four divisions and 13 squadrons for the cadet wing, and Otter squadron.; Removed Sgts from within the Squadrons but added WOs at the Division level.; initiated new uniforms	
E1607	Brigadier-General Jocelyn Lacroix (RMC 1999) CD ADC	2005–2007	Changed the dress of the day from the traditional 'college dress' to the not-so-traditional CF uniform.; initiated the 'live out project' which saw 4th year cadets move off campus to gain more life experience before heading to their first unit.	
S133	Brigadier General (Ret'd) Jean Leclerc CD ADC	2002–2005	Honorary	
8850	Rear Admiral (Ret'd) David Morse CMM, CD ADC	2000–2002	Scaled back RMC sport program; Changed RMC Redmen logo to the crown and arm of RMC.; said, "RMC makes engineers literate and artsmen numerate."; implemented a program of community and high school visits; launched the Army Technical Warrant Officers' Program (ATWOP), the RMC's first-ever major academic program designed exclusively for non-commissioned members not pursuing an officer career path.	
9098	BGen (Ret'd) Ken Hague (RMC 1972)	1997–2000	Member, Gifting committee, Royal Military Colleges Club Foundation	
6496	Brigadier-General (Retired) Charles Émond CD ADC	1994–1997	He has served as commandant of both the RMC (1994–1997) and le Collège militaire royal de Saint-Jean (1992–1994).; RRMC and CMR closed in 1995.; Because of a large induction of francophone students from CMR, RMC was transformed into a bilingual university; The sport teams were renamed RMC Paladins from RMC Redmen to reflect a bilingual and coed institution.; He has served on RMC Board of Governors (2006–present).	
S123	Colonel (Ret`d) Howie Marsh ADC	1996–1997 (acting)		
6719	BGen (Ret'd) Michel Matte (CMR 1965)	1993–1996		
8790	Brigadier-General (Ret'd) Jean Boyle CMM, CD, ADC (RMC 1971)	1991–1993	Later became Chief of Defence Staff (CDS) (1996)	
4459	Commodore (Ret'd) Edward Murray OMM, CD, ADC ((RMC 1959)	1987–1991		
3543	BGen (Ret) Walter Niemy CD, ADC ((RMC 1956)	1985–1987		
3572	BGen (Ret) Frank J. Norman CD, ADC ((RMC 1956)	1982–1985	RMC is first and foremost a place of academic learning, set in a military environment; higher education and college degrees were more significant to the success of the officer corps in the military; Football was dropped as a varsity sport	
3173	BGen (Ret) John A. Stewart CD, ADC ((RMC 1953)	1980–1982	Women were admitted to RMC; Visit by Queen Elizabeth and Prince Philip, 21 May 1980; RMC became co-educational in 1980.; Novice boxing was dropped in 1980	
4860	BGen (Ret) John de Chastelain, CD, ADC ((RMC 1960)	1977–1980	Later became Chief of Defence Staff (CDS) (1989–93, 1994–95); Later became Canadian ambassador to the US (1993–94)	
2816	BGen (Ret) William W. Turner CD, ADC (RMC 1940)	1973–1977	The Cadet Wing paraded on Parliament Hill to celebrate the college's centennial; BGen Turner, colonel commandant of The Royal Regiment of Canadian Artillery 1 September 1979 – 31 August 1986 provided the W.W. Turner trophy for the Ottawa Gunners to present to the best third-year artillery cadet at the RMC. The trophy is in Observation Post de Hart (Op de Hart) – Home of the Ottawa Gunners, 2nd floor of the Army Officers Mess in Ottawa.	
2530	BGen (Ret) William Kirby Lye MBE CD, ADC (RMC 1936)	1970–1973	Lake Lye (near Williams Lake, British Columbia is named in BGen (Ret) William Kirby Lye's honour.; cadets were permitted to marry, with the permission of the commandant.; RMC was a military institution within an academic environment.	
2576	Commodore William Prine Hayes CD, ADC	1967–1969	4th-year cadets are permitted to wear civilian attire out on leave; The Cadet Wing paraded on Parliament Hill to celebrate Canada's centennial	
2364	Air Commodore Leonard Birchall OBE, DFC, CD, ADC	1963–1967	Graduate courses were added in 1964.	
2424	Brigadier G.H. Spencer OBE, CD, ADC	1962–1963		
2265	Brigadier William Alexander Beaumont Anderson OBE, CD, ADC	1960–1962	The `LGen W.A.B. Anderson march` (2/4) for bagpipes was composed in his honour	
2184	Commodore Desmond Piers DSC, CD, ADC	1957–1960	Commodore Piers participated in the invasion in France during World War II.; RMC became a degree-granting institution in 1959.; Queen Elizabeth and Prince Philip visit 1959	
2140	Air Commodore Douglas Bradshaw, DFC, CD, ADC	1954–1957	Air Vice-Marshal (ret`d) Douglas Bradshaw was the first president of Confederation College of Applied Arts and Technology from 6 March 1967, to 1974.	
1137	Brigadier-General Donald Agnew CB, CD, ADC LLD	1947–1954	The New One Hundred Opening Ceremonies 20 September 1948; The Old Brigade, for alumni celebrating 50 years since they entered one of the military Colleges, was inaugurated by Agnew in 1950.; Princess Elizabeth and Prince Philip visit 12 October 1951; The Collège militaire royal de Saint-Jean was founded in 1952; Pipes and Drums founded 1953	
H-2727	Major-General John Whiteley, CB, CBE, MC, ADC	1947		
2120	Brigadier-General J. Desmond B. Smith, CBE, DSO, ADC	1945–1946	first postwar Staff Course held June 1946 to June 1947; Barriefield Military School Board, first in the Canadian Army, teaches children of personnel; Barriefield complex provides housing for 13 married officer students & families.	
1841	Brigadier D.G. Cunningham DSO, ED, ADC	1944–1945	He was member of a subcommittee of the RMC Club which urged the reopening of the college.; He served as president of the RMC Club of Canada in 1946.	
H-2727	Major General Halfdan Fenton Harboe Hertzberg * CMG, DSO, MC, ADC	1940–1944	The last class graduated in 1942; RRMC in British Columbia founded in 1942.	
816	Brigadier General Kenneth Stuart, DSO, MC, ADC	1939–1940	Chief of the General Staff 1941–1943, educator	
749	Brigadier General, The Honourable Harry Crerar PC, CH, CB, DSO, CD, KStJ, ADC (RMC 1909)	1938–1939	Commandant of RMC when war broke out in 1939. Crerar commanded the First Canadian Army from 1944 to 1945.; RMC closed as a cadet college during World War II.: Crerar served as a field commander of First Canadian Army in World War II, 1944 to 1945 and after retirement, served as a diplomat and Privy Councillor.	
	Brigadier Henry H. Matthews, CMG, DSO, ADC	1935–1938		
624	Brigadier William Henry Pferinger Elkins, CB, CBE, DSO, ADC	1930–1934		
621	Brigadier Charles Francis Constantine, DSO, ADC	1925–1930	Constantine arena at RMC was named in his honour	
151	Lieutenant-General Sir Archibald Macdonell K.C.B., CMG, DSO, ADC, LL.D.	1919–1925	first Canadian commandant, assembled a Canadian military staff, Professional associations & universities negotiate to accept RMC graduates; authorized publication of RMC biannual review (alumni magazine)	
	Brigadier-General Charles Noel Perreau, CMG, ADC	1915–1919	Assembled RMC museum artefacts	
	Brigadier-General L. R. Carleton, DSO, ADC	1913–1914	Assembled RMC museum artefacts	
	Colonel J.H.V. Crowe, ADC	1909–1913	Every cadet who did not enter the British army or the Canadian Permanent Force on graduation (1910) was required to become attached to the Militia within 2 years of leaving the college and to attend two militia camps; Reported in 1910 that for the first time, every RMC graduate took a commission.	
45	Lieutenant-Colonel Edward Thornton Taylor, ADC	1905–1909	First Canadian commandant of RMC (as member of British military); introduced ice hockey to Kingston as an RMC student in 1877; competitive entrance examination, with half-yearly examinations; 3-year curriculum: civil engineering, civil & hydrographic surveying, physics, chemistry, French, English, gymnastic drills and outdoor exercises of all kinds; five imperial army commissions awarded annually; $750–$1,000 cost included board, uniform, materials and extras	
	Colonel Raymond Northland Revell Reade, ADC	1901–1905		
	Lieutenant-Colonel Gerald C. Kitson, ADC	1896–1900	replaced British civilian staff with British military personnel, tightened discipline, emphasised military training, cut the curriculum to three years; appointed Military Attache of the British Embassy in Washington in November 1900; later Major General Sir Gerald C. Kitson ADC; Commandant of Sandhurst	
	Major-General Donald Roderick Cameron, CMG, ADC	1888–1896	Then commandant, recommended international pigeon post, which provided messenger service from 1891 to 1895 for marine search and rescue and military	
	Major-General John Ryder Oliver, CMG, ADC	1886–1888	Oliver Rock, Sudbury, Ontario was named in his honour	
	Colonel Edward Osborne Hewett CMG, ADC	1875–1886	first Commandant of the Military College in Canada, member of Royal Engineers, chose motto, Truth, Duty, Valour; assembled a British civilian staff, organized a 4-year curriculum, prepared site for use as a college; Hewett Shoal, Sudbury, Ontario, was named in his honour 46°4′23″ North 82°4′14″ West; character in opera Leo, the Royal Cadet by Oscar Ferdinand Telgmann was named in his honour.	

- The Commandant of the Royal Military College of Canada is appointed ex officio as honorary Aide-de-Camp to the Governor General of Canada

== RMC Club presidents ==
Year	Number	Name	Year	Number	Name	Year	Number	Name
1884–1885	7	Lukin Homphrey Irving (first)	1886–1887	18	Duncan MacPherson	1888	4	William Mahlon Davis
1889–1890	6	Septimus Julius Augustus Denison	1891	10	Victor Brereton Rivers	1892	86	Reuben Wells Leonard
1893–1894	37	E.H. Drury	1895–1896	15	Francis Joseph Dixon	1897	48	A.K. Kirkpatrick
1898	57	H.S. Greenwood	1899	14	John Bray Cochrane	1900	41	Robert Cartwright
1901	154	F.M. Gaudet	1902	47	Ernest Frederick Wurtele	1903	21	A.E. Doucet
1904	82	Wallace Bruce Matthews Carruthers	1905	188	W.A.H. Kerr	1906	186	V.A.S. Williams
1907	139	C.R.F. Coutlee	1908	232	John Houlison	1909	91	J.D. Gibson
1910	63	George Hooper	1911	255	H.A. Panet	1912	246	Major-General Sir Henry Edward Burstall
1913	268	Henry Robert Visart de Bury et de Bocarmé	1914; 1919	299	Col. Harry J. Lamb DSO, VD	1920	293	C.J. Armstrong
1920–1922	392	W.B. Kingsmill	1923	377	A.C. Caldwell	1924	140	G.S. Cartwright
1925	499	Edouard de B. Panet	1926	631	A.B. Gillies	1927	623	S.B. Coristine
1928	555	R.R. Carr-Harris	1929	667	E.G. Hanson	1929–1930	1945 (SUO)	G.D. de S. Wotherspoon
1930–1931	1119	J.H. Price	1932	472	A.R. Chipman	1933–1934	805	Colin W. G. Gibson
1935	727	D.A. White	1936–1937	877	G.L. Magann	1938–1939	1003	A.M. Mitchell
1940–1941	803	J.V. Young	1942–1943	1141	W.H. O'Reilly	1944	698	Everett Bristol
1945	982	D.W. MacKeen	1946	1841	D.G. Cunningham	1947	1230	S.H. Dobell
1948	1855	Ian S. Johnston	1949	1625	J.D. Watt	1950	1542	E.W. Crowe
1951	1860	Nicol Kingsmill	1952	1828	Ted G.E. Beament	1953	1620	R.R. Labatt
1954	1766	Ken H. Tremain	1955	1474	de L.H.M Panet	1956	2034	Paul Y. Davoud
1957	1954	W.P. Carr	1960	1379	H.A. Mackenzie	1961	2157	J.H.R. Gagnon
1962	2183	James E. Pepall	1963	2336	J.H. Moore	1964	2351	Guy Savard
1965	2749	James B. Cronyn	1966	2601	J. Fergus Maclaren	1967	2791	Jean P.W. Ostiguy
1968–1969	RCNC90	John F. Frank	1975–1976	3661	Terry Yates	1976–1977	5533	Glenn Allen
1977–1978	3172	Marshall Soule	1980–1981	3251	Jim Tremain	1981–1982	2897	Herb Pitts
1986–1987	5604	Ken Smee	1987–1988	3010	Peter McLoughlin	1992–1993	H3356	Robin Cumine
1993–1994	5244	Tony Downs	1994–1995	H7543	Senator Joseph A. Day	1995–1996	5739	Andre Costin
1996–1997	3550	Murray Johnston	1997–1998	8813	John D. Gibson	1998–1999	G0055	Valerie Keyes (first female)
1999–2000	8833	John Leggat	2000–2001	5758	Michael Morres	2001–2002	16461	Ian MacKinnon
2002–2003	6777	Michel Charron	2003–2004	7776	Chris Lythgo	2004–2005	7943	J. William K. Lye
2005–2006	10080	Robert Booth	2006–2007	12046	Pierre Ducharme	2007–2008	6776	Tim Sparling
2008–2009	15988	Jeff Kearns	2010	16412	Gord Clarke	2011	19307	David Benoit
2012	9889	Robert Benn	2013	M0058	Marc Drolet (first UTPNCM)			

== Principals / Director of Studies ==
Name	Year
Dr. Jill Scott	2024 – current
Dr. Philip Bates	2023 – 2024
Dr. Cecile Malardier-Jugroot	2022
Dr. Harry James Kowal	2013 – 2022
Dr. Joel Jeffrey Sokolsky	2008 – 2013
Dr. John Scott Cowan	1999 – 2008
Dr. John Plant	1984 – 1999
Dr. Donald Tilley	1978 – 1984
Dr. J.R. Dacey	1967 – 1978

== First 32 female cadets to enter college in 1980 ==
Shown with college numbers.

#	Name	#	Name	#	Name	#	Name	#	Name	#	Name
14481	Doctor Linda Newton	14423	Captain (Ret'd) Elizabeth E Caswell (Dyson)	14484	Jacqueline Pothier	14390	Captain (Ret'd) Kate Armstrong, CD	14397	Chris Best		
14433	Debbie Fowler	14396	Captain Kathleen Beeman	14512	Cheryl de Bellefeuille	14451	Captain Theresa Towns (Hutchings)	14467	Captain Jo-Anne MacIsaac	14478	Theresa Murphy
14448	Rebecca Horne	14400	Sylvie Bonneau	14504	Captain Brigitte Vachon	14412	Helen Davies	14491	Colonel Karen Ritchie	14444	Captain (Ret'd) Dorothy Hector
14487	Lieutenant Colonel Suzanne Raby	14510	Lieutenant Colonel Sue Wigg	14479	Sue Nadarozny	14460	Lorraine Kuzyk	14402	Charmaine Bulger	14501	Marie Thomson
14443	Major (ret'd) Kathryn Moore (Haunts)	14508	Captain (ret'd) Sheila Cornelisse (Walters)	14418	Marnie Dunsmore	14477	Brigitte Muehlgassner	14411	Ann David	14394	Laura Beare
14407	Captain (ret'd) Marie-Pier Clarke (Cloutier)	14419	Johanne Durand	14507	Julia Walsh						

== Wall of Honour ==
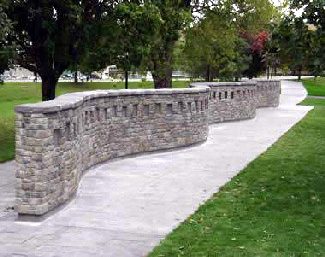
Wall of Honour, Royal Military College of Canada shown with college numbers

#	Name	#	Name	#	Name	#	Name	#	Name	#	Name
13	Aylesworth Bowen Perry	943	Billy Bishop	1681	Walter L. Gordon	1800	Hartland Molson	2399	William Landymore	2446	E. L. M. Burns
3528	Paul David Manson	4860	John de Chastelain	85	William J. Stewart	2364	Air Commodore Leonard Birchall	2791	Honorary Lieutenant-Colonel Jean P.W. Ostiguy	1921	RCMP Commissioner George Brinton McClellan, Jr., LL D (Hon)
2357	Brigadier-General William Denis Whitaker CM, DSO and Bar, ED, CD, DSc Mil (Hon)	2510	Brigadier-General Edward Alfred Charles "Ned" Amy DSO, OBE, MC, CD	4377	Lieutenant-General Richard (Rick) Joseph Evraire CMM, CD, BEng (Civil), BSc, MPA, DSc Mil (Hon)	101	Maj John Laing Weller	1248	Gen Sir Charles Falkland Loewen, GCB, KBE, DSO	1866	LCol Charles Cecil Ingersoll Merritt, VC, ED
8833	Col Lennox John Leggat, CD, PhD	13738	Colonel Chris Austin Hadfield, OC, OOnt, MSC, CD	749	General, the Honourable Henry Duncan Graham Crerar CH, CB, DSO, CD, PC	H2951	General Ramsey Muir Withers, CMM, CD, D Eng, D Mil Sc, P Eng	7860	Lieutenant-General, the Honourable Roméo Antonius Dallaire, OC, CMM, GOQ, MSC, CD	H8829	Colonel, the Honorable George Francis Gillman Stanley, CC, CD, DPhil, FRSC, FRHSC

=== Rhodes Scholars ===
As of 2011 there have been 13 Rhodes Scholars who were ex-cadets of RMC:

- 2565 Adrian A.W. Duguid (RMC 1937) Rhodes Scholar 1946, died 14 January 1968
- 4393 Doctor Desmond Morton (CMR RMC 1959) Rhodes Scholar 1959
- 5417 Colonel (ret) WK Megill (CMR RMC 1962) Rhodes Scholar 1962
- 6219 Doctor Robin Boadway (RRMC / RMC 1964) Rhodes Scholar 1964
- 6182 Doctor RB Harrison (RMC 1964) Rhodes Scholar 1964
- 6508 MGen (ret) John L Adams CMM CD (RMC 1965) Rhodes Scholar 1965
- 7291 Doctor T.A.J. Keefer (RMC 1967) Rhodes Scholar 1967
- 10419 Captain (N) (ret) David V Jacobson (CMR RMC 1975) Rhodes Scholar 1975
- 10941 Doctor Grant M Gibbs (RMC 1976) Rhodes Scholar 1976
- 15040 Mr Paul E Stanborough (RMC 1985) Rhodes Scholar 1985
- 15595 LCol (ret) WDE (Billy) Allan CD (RRMC RMC 1986) Rhodes Scholar 1987
- 23988 Mr Gino Bruni (RMC 2008) Rhodes Scholar 2010; Prairies & Jesus College, reading Jurisprudence
- 24862 2Lt Brendan Alexander (RMC 2011) Rhodes Scholar 2011, New College, Oxford to read International Relations

== Books ==
- 14390 Kate Armstrong (RMC 1984), author of memoir The Stone Frigate: The Royal Military College's First Female Cadet Speaks Out
- Walter S. Avis: Essays and articles selected from a quarter century of scholarship at the Royal Military College of Canada, Kingston (Occasional papers of the Department of English, R.M.C.) 1978
- 2141 Thomas T. L. Brock (RMC 1930) Fight the good fight: Looking in on the recruit class at the Royal Military College of Canada during a week in February 1931. 1964
- 19828 John-James Ford (RMC 1995), author of Bonk on the head, a description, in novel form, of a fictional officer-cadet's life at RMC
- G1397 Doctor Andrew A.B. Godefroy Professional training put to the test: the Royal Military College of Canada and Army Leadership in the South African War 1899–1902 The Army Doctrine and Training Bulletin 2005
- 6647 Major (Ret) Mitchell Kryzanowski (RMC 1965), wrote Currie Hall: Memorial to the Canadian Corps (Kingston: Hewson and White, 1989), a description of the decoration of Currie Hall
- S125 Major (Ret) William WJ Oliver, and S134 Mrs Rolande Oliver, RMC Hockey History Digest Eds. Red & White Books, Kingston, 2003
- 4237 Dr. Adrian Preston & Peter Dennis (Edited) Swords and Covenants Rowman And Littlefield, London. Croom Helm. 1976.
- H16511 Dr. Richard Arthur Preston To Serve Canada: A History of the Royal Military College of Canada 1997 Toronto, University of Toronto Press, 1969.
- H16511 Dr. Richard Arthur Preston Canada's RMC – A History of Royal Military College Second Edition 1982
- H16511 Dr. Richard Preston R.M.C. and Kingston: The effect of imperial and military influences on a Canadian community. 1968
- H1877 R. Guy C. Smith (editor) As You Were! Ex-Cadets Remember. In 2 Volumes. Volume I: 1876–1918. Volume II: 1919–1984. Royal Military College. [Kingston]. The R.M.C. Club of Canada. 1984
- A.G.G. Wurtele Not in Cooke. – Account of a tour by the first graduating class of the Royal Military College, Kingston, 1880.
- Richard A. Preston To Serve Canada: A History of the Royal Military College since the Second World War, Ottawa, University of Ottawa Press, 1991.
- 4669 Toivo Roht, (CMR RMC 1960) Collège militaire royal de Saint-Jean, Royal Roads Military College and Royal Military College 1955–2006 2007
- RMC Cadet Handbook Kingston: RMC, 2004
- Royal Military College of Canada: The Canadian Services Colleges 1962
- The Royal Military College of Canada 1876 to 1919
- Directory of Ex-Cadets, Royal Military College Club of Canada (RMC Club, Kingston, 1992) The book us a directory of students from Royal Military College of Canada (Kingston), Royal Roads Military College (Victoria), and College Militaire Royal de Saint-Jean (Saint-Jean-sur-Richelieu).

== See also ==
- List of Royal Military College of Canada Memorials
