= William Prine Hayes =

Canadian military officer (1919–2009)

- Born: 18 December 1919; Swift Current, Saskatchewan
- Died: 4 August 2009 (aged 89)
- Allegiance: Canada
- Branch: RCN
- Rank: Commodore
- Commands: RMC, Royal Roads Military College.
- Awards: CD, ADC

Commodore William Prine Hayes CD, ADC was a Canadian Commodore and educator. He served as the Commandant at Royal Military College of Canada from 1967 to 1969. He served as the Commandant at the Royal Roads Military College.

== Education ==
He was born in Swift Current, Saskatchewan. He graduated from the Royal Military College of Canada in Kingston, Ontario, in 1934, student #2576.

== Military career ==
Hayes served as a naval cadet, Royal Canadian Navy (Special Entry No. 49) in 1939. He was a midshipman with the Royal Canadian Navy in 1940. He was assigned to HMS Liverpool in 1940 for training. The cruiser was torpedoed near Leros by an Italian aircraft on 14 October, losing her bow. He was afterwards assigned to HMS York for training, which was later torpedoed at Suda Bay. He was posted to HMS Isis for training in 1941. She suffered damage after being hit by a bomb during the Syrian Campaign. He was posted to HMS Valiant for training in 1941, then to Naden in 1942. He served as First Lieutenant on HMCS Iroquois in 1942.

Hayes was mentioned in despatches as per Canada Gazette of 20 June 1945 and the London Gazette of 14 November 1944. He was posted to Stadacona in 1945. He served as First Lieutenant on HMCS Nootka in 1946.

He was posted to HMS Excellent for RN Long Gunnery School in 1946. he performed Gunnery Duties on HMCS Magnificent in 1948. He was posted to Stadacona for Gunnery School in 1949. He attended the Royal Navy Staff College Course in 1951. He was assigned to Niobe as Staff Officer (Gunnery) in 1951. He served as Commanding Officer of HMCS Cayuga (Tribal Class Destroyer - 218) from 23 February 1953, to 31 December 1954, (Korean War Service).

Hayes was promoted Commander in January 1954. He was posted to Naden as Executive Officer of RCN Barracks in 1955 and was then assigned to Naval HQ as Director of Naval Gunnery in 1956. He served at Naval HQ as Director Surface and Air Warfare 1957. He took the Naval Command Course for Senior Foreign Officers at United States Naval War College in 1958.

He was the officer to command HMCS Columbia from 7 November 1959 to 25 April 1961. He was promoted Captain in 1961 and made Commander Fifth Canadian Escort Squadron. He was posted to National Defence HQ (NDHQ) with Joint Missile Defence Staff in 1961. He served at NDHQ with Directorate of Strategic Studies in 1962. He served as Commandant, Royal Roads Military College from 1963 to 1965.

He was Commander Fourth Canadian Escort Squadron in 1965. He was posted to National Defence College of Canada (Course 20) in 1966. He was promoted to Commodore in 1967 and served as Commandant, Royal Military College of Canada from 1967 to 1969. He was made Honorary AdC to Governor General in 1967.

Hayes was Commander Canadian Flotilla Atlantic and Senior Officer Afloat in 1970. He served as Commandant Canadian Forces Staff College in Toronto, Ontario in 1971 and retired in 1973.

Academic offices
Preceded by Group Commander Alan Frederick Avant	Royal Roads Military College; 1963-65	Succeeded by Group Captain Wurtele
Preceded by William Kirby Lye	Commandant of the Royal Military College of Canada; 1967-1970	Succeeded by Leonard Birchall
