= General Rhodes =

General Rhodes may refer to:

- Charles Dudley Rhodes (1865–1948), U.S. Army major general
- Elisha Hunt Rhodes (1842–1917), Rhode Island Militia brigadier general
- Godfrey D. Rhodes (1886–1971), British Army brigadier general
- Rufus N. Rhodes (1856–1910), Alabama National Guard brigadier general

== See also ==
- Robert E. Rodes (1829–1864), Confederate States Army major general
