= Jean Boyle =

Canadian general (born 1947)

General Joseph Édouard Jean Boyle CMM CD
- Born: November 23, 1947 (age 78); Ottawa, Ontario
- Military career
- Allegiance: Canada
- Branch: Royal Canadian Air Force / Canadian Forces
- Rank: General
- Commands: Chief of the Defence Staff
- Awards: Commander of the Order of Military Merit; Canadian Forces' Decoration

General Joseph Édouard Jean Boyle, CMM, CD (born November 23, 1947) is a former Canadian Chief of Defence Staff. He resigned in disgrace less than a year after his appointment, when it was revealed he was involved in "almost every facet" of the attempt to manage the aftermath of the Somalia Affair, including the alteration of documents released to the media.

== Military career ==
Boyle joined the military in 1967, entering the Royal Military College of Canada as student #8790 and training under Brigadier General William Kirby Lye, whom he characterised as a "crusty old codger". He spent his first year at school in Fort Champlain, sharing a room with Brian D. Pashley, before moving on to spend his next three years living in the Stone Frigate; he participated in varsity football, handball and judo. He graduated with his Honours degree in Economics in 1971. He became Commanding Officer of the 4 Fighter Wing and Base Commander of CFB Baden-Soellingen in 1988.

He returned to the RMC as Commandant in 1991 and served for two years.

As a jet fighter pilot, he commanded 1 Canadian Air Division in Germany.

In 1995, he was made a Commander of the Order of Military Merit. As a General, Boyle fought against Canada's participation in the Ottawa Treaty to ban landmines.

Boyle was appointed the Chief of Defence Staff in January 1996, at the relatively young age of 48, being chosen ahead of more senior officers who were expected to be picked for the job. General Lewis MacKenzie later described Boyle's ascension, noting that he was "obviously out of his depth as [Chief of Defence Staff]". As the Somalian scandal was just beginning to make headlines, some suggested he was appointed specifically in the hopes that he would draw away the majority of public wrath onto himself.

== Somalia affair ==
Boyle was accused of overseeing the release of altered documents to an Access to Information request from CBC reporter Michael McAuliffe. It was later remarked that his error had been "almost ridiculously insignificant", as he had simply tried to evade persistent media questioning by providing altered documents. The military magazine Esprit de Corps labelled him "the spin doctor of the Somalia affair". With nine days of testimony, he was the most vocal witness called before the subsequent inquiry, where he "fought determinedly to defend his reputation and save his job".

While serving at National Defence Headquarters, Boyle supervised the Media Liaison Office and the Somalia Inquiry Liaison Team which was in charge of delivering documents to the military inquiry. He filed a court motion seeking to forbid the inquiry to reach any findings that would discredit him, but was unsuccessful.

On April 8, 1996, Boyle ordered the military to "stand down all but essential operations" to help conduct a search for files relating to Somalia that had not yet been provided to the Commission. Military planes were grounded, and 99% of staff; including military barbers and chaplains, were asked to go through their files. At the time, the troops referred to the effort as an Easter Egg hunt. The only noted exception was 1,000 peacekeeping troops serving in Bosnia, about whom there were conflicting media reports as to whether they had been forced to stand down for the day to join the hunt. While the move was widely ridiculed by the media, it led to the inexplicable discovery of logbooks belonging to 2^{er} Commando being found in a locked filing cabinet at CFB Petawawa. On April 15, he arrived at the Commission's office, "tired and haggard", with previously unseen documents which contradicted some of his earlier statements.

Around this time, Boyle told Col. Ralph Coleman, Director General of Public Affairs, that he was unhappy with how the media were portraying him. He was granted a $7,500 bursary with which to purchase a teleprompter and seven hours of verbal coaching from a civilian media expert on how to handle himself in front of reporters.

On August 12, 1996, Boyle's first day of testimony before the inquiry, he mistakenly took the Bible in his left hand, when asked to place his right hand upon it; a gaffe noted by commissioner Peter Desbarats. He was later recalled as handsome and confident, but criticised for appearing "tight-lipped and clenched" and providing "long and convoluted" answers to questions. The following day, he was noted to have absolved the media of any blame in the scandal, and agreed that the responsibility lay with the military itself. In late August, it was reported that Boyle had passed a polygraph test.

Through most of the inquiry, Roberto Gonzalez had maintained that, as Director General of Public Affairs at NDHQ, he had no memory of providing Boyle information about the intention to alter documents in the Media Liaison Office, but that he "must have"; a stance which Boyle refuted. On September 10, 1996, Gonzalez announced that he had remembered the details of giving the information to Boyle, Assistant Deputy Minister Robert Fowler and Dr. Ken Calder - although there were questions about his credibility. Boyle was criticised for failing to take responsibility for any of his alleged actions, and instead "began to heap blame on his subordinates", angering other military leaders.

The inquiry eventually found Boyle had "displayed poor and inadequate leadership" on three general allegations, that he had sought to provide misleading information on the military mission, that he had failed to take steps to support the inquiry's search for documents, and interact honestly with the liaison team set up to collect information.

If we want the chief of the defence staff to fall on his sword for every indiscretion committed during his command--all that guarantees us is an endless series of defence chiefs.

— Desmond Morton, Director of the McGill Institute for the Study of Canada.

Interviewed by CTV, Defence Minister David Collenette sought to correct those who suggested that he was strongly supporting Boyle. This gave commentators the view that he was distancing himself, to avoid being caught in the undertow of the scandal and survive with his political office intact. As Commissioner Peter Desbarats later summarised, it indicated "he perhaps has already decided to sacrifice Boyle in order to protect himself". When Collenette was forced to resign shortly afterwards, it was suggested that the government could not forgive Boyle "for endangering the Minister" and would leave him to figuratively fall on his own sword.

He tendered his resignation in October 1996, shortly after making a high-level visit to Japan in his position as chief of the Canadian military.

== Resignation and later life ==
Following his resignation, Boyle began using the anglicized name John and joined Boeing International, and served as Vice President of their International Business Development branch from 1997–1999, and as Managing Director of their European arm from 2000-2001. Since his appointment to the Defence Firm came only three months after his resignation, the Ethics Commissioner was asked to investigate, but reported that all routes were properly pursued and there was no wrongdoing.

In 1999, he was a guest speaker at the CANSEC defence and security trade show in Ottawa.

In 2002, he was named to the board of directors of military contractor Simula Incorporated. In 2003, Boyle spoke at a Freedom and Privacy convention hosted by BT Group, and gave a presentation on how a "bad [Freedom of Information] decision" had led to the resignation of both himself and Collenette and became an election issue; leading to a warning that the United Kingdom "will be at the same stage as Canada" within three years.

On August 18, 2005, he was elected to the board of directors for Liska Biometry, and resigned March 8, 2006. Four months later, he was named to the Advisory Board of Meta4hand.

He currently serves as the Canadian head of the Spectrum Group defence consultants, and CEO of JEBtek, a Canadian business consulting group which is a lobbyist in Canadian government for Titus International Inc.

== Rank history ==
- Major, 1977
- Lieutenant-Colonel, 1982
- Colonel, 1985
- Brigadier-General,
- Major-General, 1993
- Lieutenant-General, July 1, 1995
- General, Chief of Defence Staff, December 19, 1995

== Personal ==
Boyle's father Jean-Edouard Zotiac Boyle was also a graduate RMC (1930). <res><>

Academic offices
Preceded by Colonel Howie Marsh	Commandant of the Royal Military College of Canada; 1991	Succeeded by Commodore Edward Murray
Military offices
Preceded by A.J.G.D. de Chastelain	Chief of the Defence Staff; 1996	Succeeded by L.E. Murray
