= Frederick Carson =

Frederick Carson may refer to:

- Sir Charles Frederick Carson (1886–1960), Canadian Brigadier in the British Army
- Frederick Carson, character in Angel (1937 film)
- Fred Carson, secret identity of Wonder Man (Fox Publications)
- Freddie Carson, character in Night Heat
- Fred Carson, actor in Star Trek: The Original Series episode Operation -- Annihilate!
