= Kate Armstrong =

Kate Armstrong may refer to:

- Kate Armstrong (artist), Canadian artist, writer and curator
- Kate Armstrong (memoirist) (born 1962), Canadian author
