= John de Chastelain =

Canadian diplomat and soldier (born 1937)

General John de Chastelain CC CMM CD CH

Chairman of the Independent International Commission on Decommissioning
- In office 1997–2011

More...

Personal details
- Born: 30 July 1937 (age 89) Bucharest, Kingdom of Romania
- Spouse: Mary Ann (née Laverty)
- Children: 2
- Education: Royal Military College of Canada; Mount Royal University
- Awards: Order of the Companions of Honour (Member); Order of Canada (Companion); Legion of Merit (Commander); Order of Military Merit (Commander); Order of St. John (Commander); Canadian Forces' Decoration

Military service
- Allegiance: Canada
- Branch/service: Land Force Command
- Years of service: 1956–1995
- Rank: General
- Unit: Princess Patricia's Canadian Light Infantry; The Calgary Highlanders
- Commands: 2nd Battalion, PPCLI; CFB Montreal; Royal Military College; 4 Canadian Mechanized Brigade Group; Canadian Armed Forces
- Battles/wars: October Crisis; Oka Crisis

Alfred John Gardyne Drummond de Chastelain CC CMM CD CH (born 30 July 1937) is a Canadian former army officer and diplomat.

De Chastelain was born in Romania to Scottish and American parents and was educated in England and Scotland before his family emigrated to Canada in 1954. There, de Chastelain became a Militia private and enrolled in the Royal Military College of Canada, going on to pursue a career in the Canadian Army. He was commissioned into Princess Patricia's Canadian Light Infantry and rose eventually to be twice Chief of the Defence Staff, with a break of a year during which he served as Canada's ambassador to the United States. In 1995, de Chastelain became active in the Northern Ireland peace process and eventually focused on the disarmament of paramilitary groups in Northern Ireland.

== Early life and education ==
De Chastelain was born on 30 July 1937 in Bucharest, Romania, to Alfred Gardyne de Chastelain, a Scottish oil engineer then working in Bucharest for British Petroleum, (later an agent of SOE) and Marion Elizabeth de Chastelain, an American. He was educated in England and later at Fettes College, Edinburgh. The de Chastelain family emigrated to Canada in 1954, and a year later, after finishing his education at Fettes College, De Chastelain joined his family and attended Mount Royal College (now Mount Royal University) in Calgary. He married Mary Ann Laverty.

== Military ==
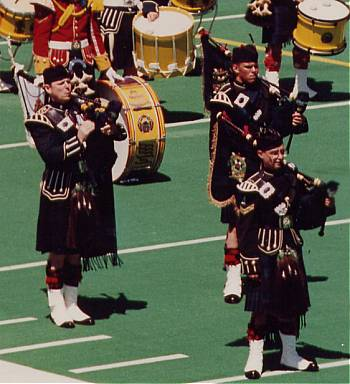
On parade with The Calgary Highlanders on 30 June 1990; General de Chastelain (top left)

De Chastelain started his military career as a Militia private in the Calgary Highlanders in which he served from January to September 1956. He was enrolled in the Royal Military College of Canada in September 1956 and graduated in 1960 with a Bachelor of Arts degree in history and a commission in Princess Patricia's Canadian Light Infantry (PPCLI), two years before he became a naturalized Canadian. Performing regimental duty in Canada, Germany, and Cyprus, de Chastelain subsequently attended the British Army staff college in Camberley in 1966 and was commanding officer of the Second Battalion PPCLI from 1970 to 1972.

As a colonel, he commanded CFB Montreal for a two-year period ending with the 1976 Summer Olympics in that city. He was also Deputy Chief of Staff of the United Nations Force in Cyprus (UNFICYP) and Commander of the Canadian contingent there. As a brigadier-general, he successively became Commandant of the Royal Military College of Canada in 1977, Commander of 4 Canadian Mechanized Brigade Group in Lahr, Germany in 1980 and Director General Land Doctrine and Operations at National Defence Headquarters in Ottawa, Ontario in 1982.

As a major-general, de Chastelain was Deputy Commander of the Canadian Army (then called Mobile Command) and Commander of the Mobile Command Division, which was exercised as such in 1985 on Exercise RV '85. As a lieutenant-general, he became Assistant Deputy Minister for Personnel in 1986 and then Vice-Chief of the Defence Staff in 1988. In 1989, he was promoted to the rank of general and appointed Chief of the Defence Staff.

In 1993, he transferred to the Reserves and was appointed Ambassador to the United States by Brian Mulroney. In 1994, shortly after the election of Jean Chrétien, he was recalled to Regular Force duty and re-appointed Chief of the Defence Staff, replacing Admiral Anderson and vacating the office of Ambassador for Raymond Chrétien. de Chastelain served as Chief of Defence Staff until his retirement in December 1995.

== Civilian ==
From November 1995, de Chastelain was involved in the Northern Ireland peace process and from 1997 to 2011 he was Chairman of the Independent International Commission on Decommissioning, which was responsible for ensuring the decommissioning of arms by paramilitary groups in Northern Ireland. He has made an impact on the way that Britain has viewed the IRA since the decommissioning has begun. As part of the Good Friday Agreement an independent neutral adjudicator was selected to look over the disarmament of Republican and Loyalist paramilitary weapons in Northern Ireland.

== Honours ==
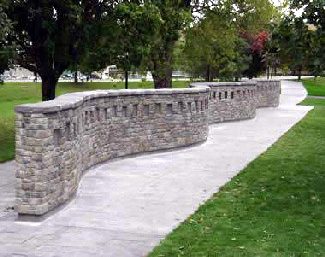
Wall of Honour, Royal Military College of Canada

In 1985, de Chastelain was appointed Commander of the Order of Military Merit and in 1991, Commander of the Order of St John; in 1993, he received the Commendation Medal of Merit and Honour of Greece, and was appointed Officer of the Order of Canada; in 1995, he was appointed Commander of the Legion of Merit (U.S.A.); in 1999, he was made a Member of the Order of the Companions of Honour; and in 2014, he was promoted to Companion of the Order of Canada. Archie Cairns composed a jig for bagpipes in his honour in 1992. A piobaireached named for him was also written by Pipe Major Robert Henderson of The Calgary Highlanders.

De Chastelain had an honorary Doctor of Military Science degree from the Royal Military College of Canada, an honorary Doctor of Laws (Conflict Resolution) degree from Royal Roads University in British Columbia, an honorary Doctor of Education degree from Nipissing University, an honorary Doctor of Laws degree from Carleton University, an honorary Doctor of Laws degree from Queen's University, Kingston, an honorary Doctor of Civil Law degree from Saint Mary's University, an honorary Doctor of Laws degree from Brock University, an honorary Doctor of Laws degree from Concordia University, an honorary Doctor of Laws degree from Mount Allison University and a Doctorate Honoris Causa from the University of Edinburgh, and an honorary Doctor of Laws degree from Mount Royal University. He is an Honorary Fellow of Lady Margaret Hall, Oxford. De Chastelain was a recipient of the Vimy Award in 1992.

Academic offices
| Preceded by William W. Turner | Commandant of the Royal Military College of Canada; 1977–1980 | Succeeded by John A. Stewart |
Military offices
| Preceded by J.E. Vance | Vice Chief of the Defence Staff; 1988–1989 | Succeeded by C.M.W. Thomas |
| Preceded by P.D. Manson | Chief of the Defence Staff; 1989–1993 | Succeeded by J.R. Anderson |
| Preceded by J.R. Anderson | Chief of the Defence Staff; 1994–1995 | Succeeded by J.E.J. Boyle |
Diplomatic posts
| Preceded by Derek Burney | Canadian Ambassador Extraordinary and Plenipotentiary to the United States of America; 1993–1994 | Succeeded by Raymond Chrétien |
Political offices
| Preceded by new position | Chairman of the Independent International Commission on Decommissioning; 1997–2011 | Succeeded by none |
