= J.O. Michel Maisonneuve =

Canadian general

- Military career
- Allegiance: Canada
- Branch: Canadian Army
- Service years: 1972-2007
- Rank: Lieutenant-General
- Conflicts: United Nations Peacekeeping Force in Cyprus (UNFICYP); Bosnian War; Kosovo War
- Awards: Commander of the Order of Military Merit; Meritorious Service Cross; Canadian Forces' Decoration

Lieutenant-General J.O. Michel Maisonneuve, CMM, MSC, CD is a former Canadian Army officer who has served as the Assistant Deputy Chief of the Defence Staff of Canada and Chief of Staff of NATO's Allied Command Transformation in Norfolk. He is also the 30th recipient of the Vimy Award.

== Education ==
Maisonneuve obtained a Bachelor of Arts degree from the Royal Military College of Canada in 1976 and later he graduated with a Masters in Management and Defence Policy from the Royal Military College of Canada.

== Military career ==
Maisonneuve joined the Canadian Armed Forces (CAF) in 1972 as an armoured officer and after graduating from Royal Military College of Canada, he would be a part of 12e Régiment blindé du Canada out of Valcartier. He would be deployed to the United Nations Peacekeeping Force in Cyprus and later the Bosnian War and Kosovo War. During his time in Kosovo he was assigned to Headquarters of the Organization for Security and Cooperation in Europe (OSCE) as a Brigadier-General from November 1998 to May 1999 where he would later be awarded a Meritorious Service Cross for his service.

He would later serve as Assistant Deputy Chief of the Defence Staff of Canada and Chief of Staff of NATO's Allied Command Transformation in Norfolk.

In 2007 he would retire from the CAF and became the Academic Director at the Royal Military College Saint-Jean.

== Medals and awards ==

Ribbon	Description	Notes
	Order of Military Merit (CMM)	
	Meritorious Service Cross (MSC)	
	Special Service Medal	With 2 Bars
	Canadian Peacekeeping Service Medal	
	NATO Mission to Cyprus	With "3" Numeral
	UN Protection Force (Yugoslavia)	With "2" Numeral
	125th Anniversary of the Confederation of Canada Medal	
	Queen Elizabeth II's Diamond Jubilee Medal	
	Canadian Forces' Decoration (CD)	2 Clasps; 32 years of service in the Canadian Forces
	NATO Meritorious Service Medal	
	Legion d'Honneur	Degree of Officer; From France
	Legion of Merit	Degree of Officer; From United States of America

- 30th recipient of the Vimy Award

== Controversy ==
On November 9, 2022, Maisonneuve delivered an acceptance speech for the Vimy Award at a gala hosted by the Conference of Defence Associations Institute. The speech was broadly critical of many progressive aspects of society and the direction of Canada's military. In subsequent reporting, Youri Cormier, executive director of the Conference of Defence Associations and CDA Institute noted that "many attendees were offended by LGen (ret’d) Maisonneuve’s speech. His remarks do not reflect those of the CDA Institute." The speech was also publicly criticized by the Minister of National Defence, Anita Anand, and the Canadian Armed Forces' Chief, Professional Conduct and Culture (CPCC).

However, he was invited to speak as a keynote speaker by the Conservative Party of Canada at their policy convention on 7 September 2023 and once again received applause from delegates after endorsing Pierre Poilievre at said speech.

== Legacy ==
The Maisonneuve Bursaries and Shield Award at the Royal Military College Saint-Jean is named in his honour; it is awarded to the two 1st year Officer Cadets with the highest academic averages in Social Sciences and Sciences.
