= Edward Thornton Taylor =

Canadian soldier and amateur athlete

Colonel Edward Thornton Taylor
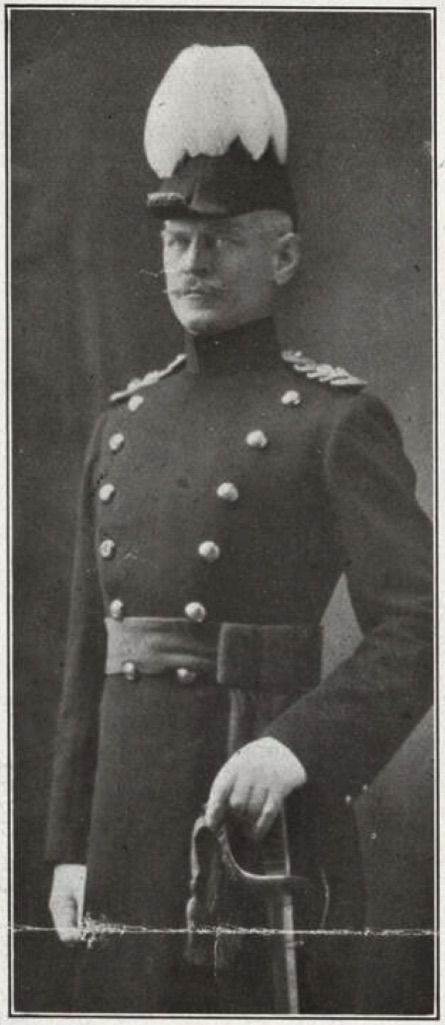

Personal details
- Born: September 13, 1858 Montreal, Quebec, Canada
- Died: January 25, 1922 (aged 63) Mandla Central Province, India
- Education: Royal Military College of Canada
- Profession: Soldier

Military service
- Allegiance: Canada
- Branch/service: Canadian Army, Canadian Forces Land Force Command
- Rank: Colonel

Edward Thornton Taylor (September 13, 1858 – January 25, 1922) was a Canadian soldier and amateur athlete. He was the first Canadian-born commandant of the RMC. He was the first commandant who was a graduate of the Royal Military College. He introduced ice hockey to Kingston, Ontario, as an RMC student in 1878.

== Education ==
Taylor was born in Montreal in 1858. He graduated from McGill University in 1878 and went on to RMC, where he introduced ice hockey to Kingston (student # 45). As a cadet at RMC, Taylor won the sword of honour in 1882 and the sword is in the collection of the RMC museum. He served as battalion sergeant-major at RMC.

== Military career ==
He was the first RMC cadet to attend the staff college course at Camberly (1895). He joined the 2nd Battalion of the Cheshire regiment. He served with his regiment and on the staff in India and Burma, often in instructional positions. He was fond of climbing and shooting tigers. He was an energetic man of great physical endurance who possessed an almost boyish enthusiasm. Lieutenant Colonel Taylor served as the sixth Commandant at RMC, (1905-9). At the time, about 80 cadets were in training. Cadets had to pass a competitive examination on entering, with half-yearly examinations afterwards to obtain diplomas. Although the college was organized on a strictly military basis, a thoroughly practical and complete course of study in civil engineering, civil and hydro-graphic surveying, physics, chemistry, French and English was provided. The practice of gymnastic drills and outdoor exercises of all kinds ensured good health and fine physical condition. Five commissions in the imperial army were awarded yearly to the cadets who stand highest. The length of the course was three years, in three terms of nine and a half months' residence each. The total cost of the course, including board, uniform, instructional material and all extras, was from $750 to $1,000. As Commandant, he indicated the difficulty involved if RMC graduates who did not take a commission in the British army or Canadian Permanent Active Force were required to serve for a stated time in the Non-Permanent Active Force. This compulsory military service would be difficult since graduates did not always live near militia units. He recommended that graduates be posted to a unit of their choice rather than simply be placed on the reserve of officers. In 1906, the practice began at the RMC club annual dinner of calling the roll by having each member rise in place in turn and announce their college number and name in order of seniority. In 1907, the loving cup was circulated for the first time around the table at the RMC club annual dinner. Although Taylor , promoted on 4 April 1910 to colonel, retired in 1916, he commanded the labour corps in France in 1917.

Taylor died on January 25, 1922, in Mandla district, India.

Academic offices
Preceded by Colonel J.H.V. Crowe	Commandant of the Royal Military College of Canada; 1905-9	Succeeded by Colonel Raymond Northland Revell Reade
