= Vimy Award =

The Vimy Award is an award presented by the Conference of Defence Associations Institute (CDA Institute) to the "Canadian who has made a significant and outstanding contribution to the defence and security of Canada and the preservation of (its) democratic values". The "VIMY AWARD", a 1/4-scale statue of a World War I officer by André Gauthier, was commissioned for the CDA Institute. The award, first presented in 1991, is given annually in November at a dinner held at the Canadian War Museum. The 2013 Vimy Award went to Brigadier-General Don Macnamara, a former President of the CDA Institute and member of the CDA Institute's Board of Directors; the CDA is the sponsor of the Vimy Award since 1991. The Award honours the bravery and sacrifices of the Canadian soldiers who were victorious at the Battle of Vimy Ridge in April 1917.

== Past winners ==
Past recipients of the Vimy Award are:

1991 Joe Clark, Right Honourable
1992 John de Chastelain, General
1993 Lewis MacKenzie, Major-General
1994 William Howard, Major-General
1995 Roméo Dallaire, Major-général
1996 Jack Granatstein, Doctor
1997 Brian Dickson, Right Honourable
1998 Larry Murray, Vice-Admiral
1999 Charles H. Belzile, Lieutenant-général
2000 Barnett Danson, Right Honourable
2001 Leonard Birchall, Air Commodore
2002 John Allen Fraser, Colonel, the Honourable
2003 Paul David Manson, General
2004 David Bercuson, Doctor
2005 Gordon Hamilton Southam
2006 David Fraser, Brigadier-General
2007 Ray Henault, General
2008 Rick Hillier, General
2009 William Kenneth MacDonald, Warrant Officer
2010 Adrienne Clarkson, Right Honourable
2011 Jonathan Vance, Major-General
2012 Federick Mannix, Honorary Colonel
2013 Don Macnamara, Brigadier-General (Ret’d)
2014 Blake Goldring, Honorary Colonel
2015 Hugh Segal, Senator
2016 James Boutilier, Doctor
2017 William Graham, Honourable
2018 Christine Whitecross, Lieutenant-General
2019 Richard Fadden, OC
2020 J.O. Michel Maisonneuve, Lieutenant-général
2023 Jacqueline O'Neill, Ambassador
2024 Walt Natynczyk, General (Ret'd)
