= Bonk on the Head =

2005 novel by John-James Ford

- Author: John-James Ford
- Publisher: Nightwood Editions
- Publication date: June 24, 2005
- ISBN: 978-0-889-71204-1

Bonk on the Head is a 2005 novel by Canadian poet and writer John-James Ford, published by Nightwood Editions. it is about coming of age in a journey that takes the protagonist through the final years of high school, a reserve regiment and the Royal Military College of Canada.

The novel was reviewed in Books in Canada, Broken Pencil, The Globe and Mail, and the Calgary Herald.

Bonk on the Head tied with The Sundog Season by John Geddes in winning the 2006 Ottawa Book Award in the English fiction category.
