= Leonard Birchall =

Canadian Air Force officer (1915–2004)

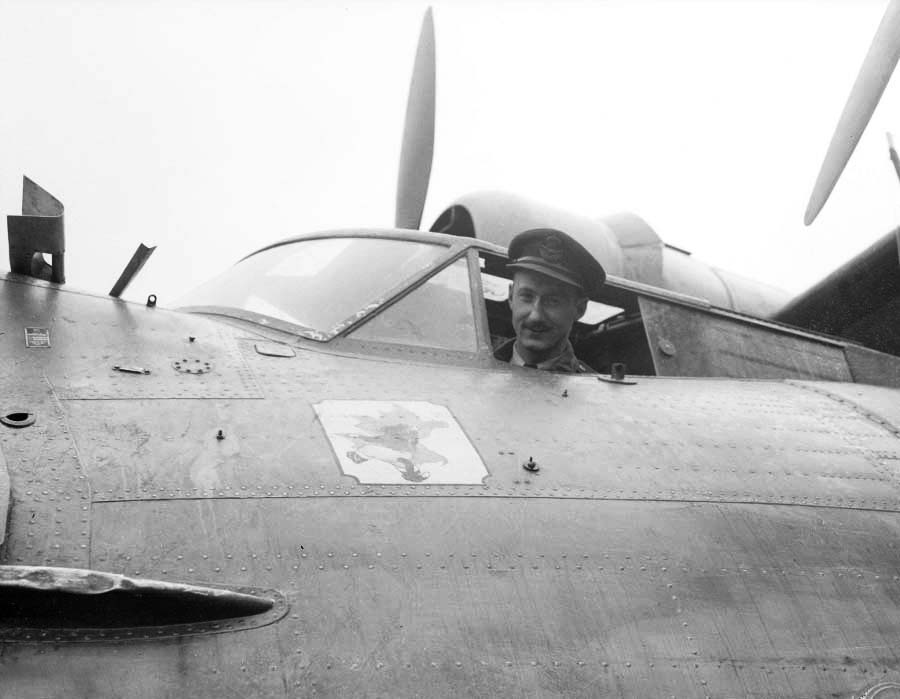
- Squadron Leader Leonard Birchall aboard a Consolidated PBY Catalina in 1942
- Born: 6 July 1915; St. Catharines, Ontario
- Died: 10 September 2004 (aged 89); Kingston, Ontario
- Military career
- Allegiance: Canada
- Branch: Royal Canadian Air Force
- Service years: 1933–1967
- Rank: Air Commodore
- Commands: Royal Military College of Canada; No. 413 Squadron RCAF
- Conflicts: Second World War
- Awards: Member of the Order of Canada; Officer of the Order of the British Empire; Distinguished Flying Cross; Order of Ontario; Canadian Forces' Decoration; Officer of the Legion of Merit (United States)

Air Commodore Leonard Joseph Birchall, CM, OBE, DFC, OOnt, CD (6 July 1915 – 10 September 2004), "The Saviour of Ceylon", was a Royal Canadian Air Force (RCAF) officer who warned of a Japanese attack on the island of Ceylon during the Second World War.

== Early life ==
Birchall was born in St. Catharines, Ontario and graduated from St. Catharines Collegiate. He was always interested in flying, and worked odd jobs around St. Catharines to pay for flying lessons.

== Military service ==
After serving in the Royal Canadian Corps of Signals, Birchall enrolled as a cadet at the Royal Military College of Canada in Kingston, Ontario (student #2364) in 1933. He was commissioned in the Royal Canadian Air Force (RCAF) upon graduation in 1937 and was trained as a pilot.

=== Second World War ===
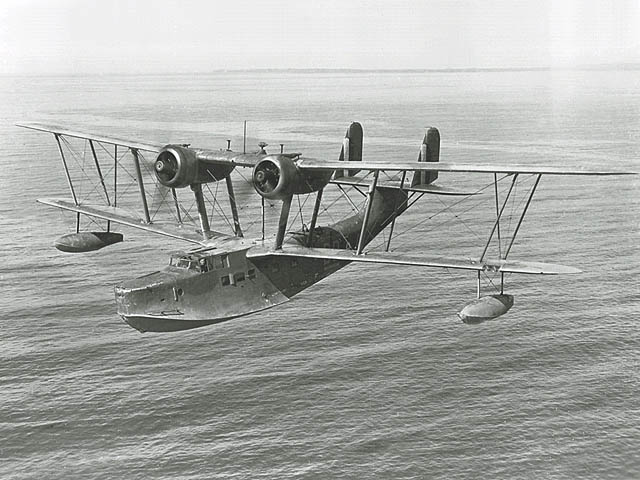
RCAF Stranraer in wartime camouflage

At the outbreak of the Second World War in 1939, Flying Officer Birchall flew convoy and anti-submarine patrols from Nova Scotia flying with No. 5 Squadron RCAF. The squadron was equipped with the Supermarine Stranraer.

On June 10, 1940, Birchall was responsible for the capture of an Italian merchant ship, the Capo Nola, in the Gulf of Saint Lawrence, hours after Canada declared war on Italy. Birchall had been tasked with locating any Italian vessels still in Canadian waters as the outbreak of war became imminent. On June 10, he found the Capo Nola. Birchall had been informed of the declaration of war by radio so made a low pass over the freighter, as if making an attack. This panicked the captain into running his vessel aground against a sandbank. Birchall then touched down nearby and waited until Royal Canadian Navy vessels reached the scene. The Capo Nola's crew were the first Italian prisoners taken by the Allies during the war.

In early 1942, he joined No. 413 Squadron RCAF, then based in the Shetland Islands and flew patrols over the North Sea. After the Japanese successes in southeast Asia, the squadron was sent to Ceylon to provide a reconnaissance force.

On 4 April 1942, only two days after his arrival, Squadron Leader Birchall was flying a PBY Catalina flying boat (AJ155/QL-A) that was patrolling the ocean to the south of Ceylon. Nine hours into the mission, as the plane was about to return to base, ships were spotted on the horizon. Investigation revealed a large Japanese fleet, the Nagumo Task Force (Responsible for the attack on Pearl Harbor), including five aircraft carriers, heading for Ceylon, which at that time was the base for the Royal Navy's Eastern Fleet. Birchall's crew managed to send out a radio message, but the Catalina was soon shot down by six A6M2 Zero fighters from the carrier Hiryū.

The Japanese continued to strafe the wreck seriously wounding Sergeant John Henzell in the front turret. He was lost when the aircraft sank along with Warrant Officer Lucien "Louis" Colarossi. The Japanese continued their attack on those survivors in the water killing Sgt. Davidson. The remaining six crew members were eventually picked up by the Japanese destroyer Isokaze.

The Easter Sunday Raid went ahead despite Birchall's signal, but his warning put the defenders on alert and allowed the harbour to be partially cleared before the Japanese attacked Colombo.

=== Prisoner of war ===
The survivors from the Catalina, including Birchall, spent the rest of the war as prisoners of war (POWs).

For many captured servicemen, a trip to a Japanese camp meant death. As the senior Allied officer in four successive Japanese prisoner of war camps, Birchall repeatedly stood up to the Japanese and demanded fair treatment of the prisoners, in compliance with the Geneva Convention. In his first camp, he struck a Japanese soldier who was forcing a wounded Australian to work. This earned Birchall a severe beating and solitary confinement, but won him the respect of the other POWs. In 1944, Birchall encountered a situation in which sick men were being forced to work on the docks. He ordered all of the men to stop working until the sick were excused. Birchall was beaten and sent to a special discipline camp, where he again was beaten. He saved many ill soldiers by taking their beatings. His actions helped to reduce the Allied death rate in the camps where he was interned from an average of 30% to less than 2%.

Birchall was liberated on 27 August 1945 by American troops. His wife Dorothy had not known whether he was dead or alive for two years. His diaries, written during his captivity and buried, formed the basis of a number of Allied wartime trials at which Birchall testified.

== Postwar ==
In the immediate postwar years, Birchall served on the Canadian attaché staff in Washington, D.C., then was a member of the Canadian NATO delegation in Paris. He later commanded a fighter base and was commandant of the Royal Military College of Canada from 1963 until his retirement from the Canadian Forces in 1967. He retired from the RCAF rather than be associated with the unification of the Armed Forces. He later served as honorary colonel of 400 Tactical Helicopter and Training Squadron in the Air Reserve and No. 413 Squadron Regular Forces.

From 1967 to 1982 Birchall was chief executive and administrative officer of the Faculty of Administrative Studies at York University, which awarded him the degree of Doctor of Laws honoris causa on the occasion of his retirement in 1982.

In the 1994 general election in Sri Lanka, Birchall was an official observer.

Birchall died in Kingston, Ontario at the age of 89.

== Honours ==
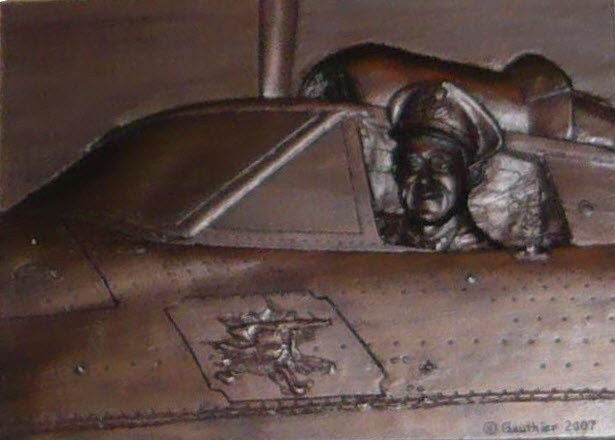
Air Commodore Leonard Birchall Leadership Award, at Royal Military College of Canada; bas-relief bronze by Colonel (ret’d) Andre Gauthier

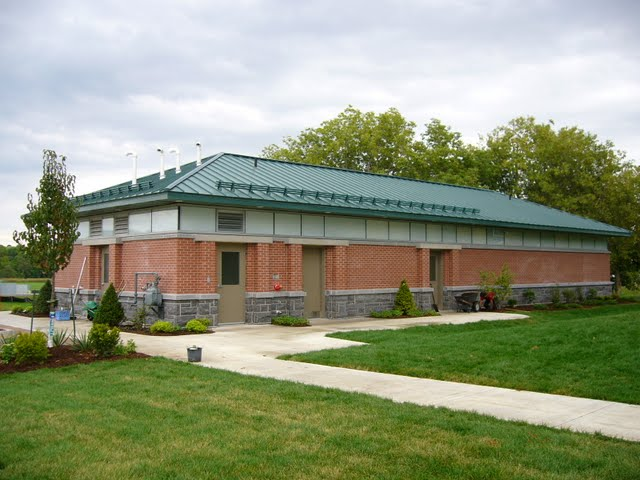
Birchall Pavilion, Royal Military College of Canada

Birchall was made an Officer of the Order of the British Empire (OBE) in 1946, after his return to Canada for his work at prisoner of war camps. The citation, in part, read: "he continually displayed the utmost concern for the welfare of fellow prisoners with complete disregard for his own safety. His consistent gallantry and glowing devotion to his men were in keeping with the finest traditions of the service". Birchall was also awarded the Distinguished Flying Cross (DFC) for his part in detecting the attack on Ceylon and for alerting the Allies during that 1942 flight. The presentation was made on 29 April 1946 at the Embassy of Ceylon in Washington, D.C., United States. Hume Wrong, the Canadian Ambassador to the United States, presented the OBE and the DFC to Birchall, in the presence of the Ambassador of Ceylon, Sir Claude Corea.

When citizens of his hometown, St. Catharines, Ontario, heard Birchall was missing in action, students of Connaught school planted a memorial tree. The Len Birchall Memorial Circle is also in St. Catharines.

In 1950, U.S. President Harry Truman appointed Birchall an Officer of the Legion of Merit, saying: "His exploits became legendary throughout Japan and brought renewed faith and strength to many hundreds of ill and disheartened prisoners."

In 2000, Birchall was appointed a Member of the Order of Canada. In 2001, he was inducted into Canada's Aviation Hall of Fame. He was honorary colonel at the Royal Military College of Canada. Birchall was the only member of the Canadian military to have earned five clasps for his Canadian Forces' Decoration (CD), representing 62 years of service with the air force. The only other person with five clasps was Queen Elizabeth The Queen Mother.

As a recipient of the 2001 Vimy Award, Birchall was recognized as a Canadian who made a significant and outstanding contribution to the defence and security of Canada and the preservation of Canada's democratic values. He was also honoured for his years of service to the community, including building a facility in 1993 at a Kingston Girl Guide camp at his own cost.

The Leonard Birchall Sports pavilion at the Royal Military College of Canada, in the area of the Navy Bay sports fields, was constructed in his honour, from December 2008 to September 2009. The road leading to the terminal and hangars at Kingston's Norman Rogers Airport is named Len Birchall Way.

Birchall was honoured in 2009 as one of the 100 most influential Canadians in aviation and had his name emblazoned directly behind the starboard roundel on the fuselage with the others on the 2009 CF-18 Centennial of Flight demonstration Hornet.

His widow Kathleen Birchall donated money to the Air Cadet League of Canada to set up a scholarship in his name. On 9 November 2011, 883 Air Commodore Leonard Birchall Squadron of the Royal Canadian Air Cadets based in Markham, Ontario was formed.

In 2011, Air Commodore Birchall's name was also added to the wall of honour at the Royal Military College of Canada.

Birchall was dubbed the "Saviour of Ceylon" by the Canadian press and not, as claimed by many, by Winston Churchill.

== Full medal entitlement ==
The full medal entitlement of Air Commodore Leonard Birchall is as follows:

| Ribbon | Description | Notes |
| | Order of Canada (CM) | Member; 21 October 1999 |
| | Order of the British Empire (OBE) | Officer; Military Division; 1946 |
| | Order of Ontario (O.Ont) | Member; 1989 |
| | Distinguished Flying Cross (DFC) | 1946 |
| | 1939–1945 Star | |
| | Atlantic Star | |
| | Africa Star | |
| | Pacific Star | With BURMA Clasp |
| | Canadian Volunteer Service Medal | With Overseas Clasp |
| | War Medal | |
| | Special Service Medal | With NATO-OTAN Clasp |
| | Queen Elizabeth II Coronation Medal | 1953 |
| | Canadian Centennial Medal | 1967 |
| | Queen Elizabeth II Silver Jubilee Medal | 1977; Canadian Version of this Medal |
| | 125th Anniversary of the Confederation of Canada Medal | 1992 |
| | Queen Elizabeth II Golden Jubilee Medal | 2002; Canadian Version of this Medal |
| | Canadian Forces' Decoration (CD) | George VI Version; 5 Bars |
| | Legion of Merit | Officer; 1950; Awarded By the United States |

Academic offices
| Preceded by Commodore W.P. Hayes | Commandant of the Royal Military College of Canada; 1963–1967 | Succeeded by Brigadier G.H. Spencer |
