= Paul David Manson =

Canadian general (1934–2023)

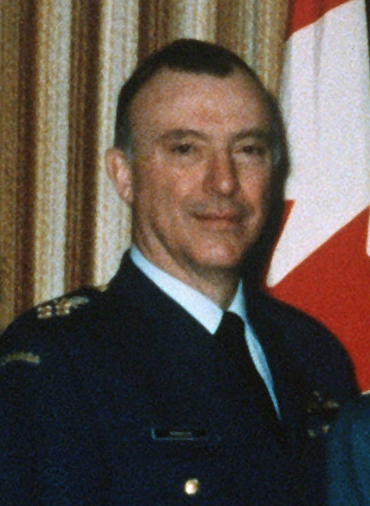
- Manson in 1987
- Born: August 20, 1934; Trail, British Columbia, Canada
- Died: July 1, 2023 (aged 88)
- Military career
- Branch: Air Command (Note: Known as Royal Canadian Air Force until 1968)
- Service years: 1952–1989
- Rank: General
- Commands: 441 Tactical Fighter Squadron; 1 Canadian Air Group; Air Command; Chief of the Defence Staff
- Awards: Commander of the Order of Military Merit; Canadian Forces' Decoration
- Other work: Chairman of Lockheed Martin Canada

General Paul David Manson OC CMM CD (August 20, 1934 – July 1, 2023) was a Canadian Forces officer, fighter pilot and businessman.

== Early life and education ==
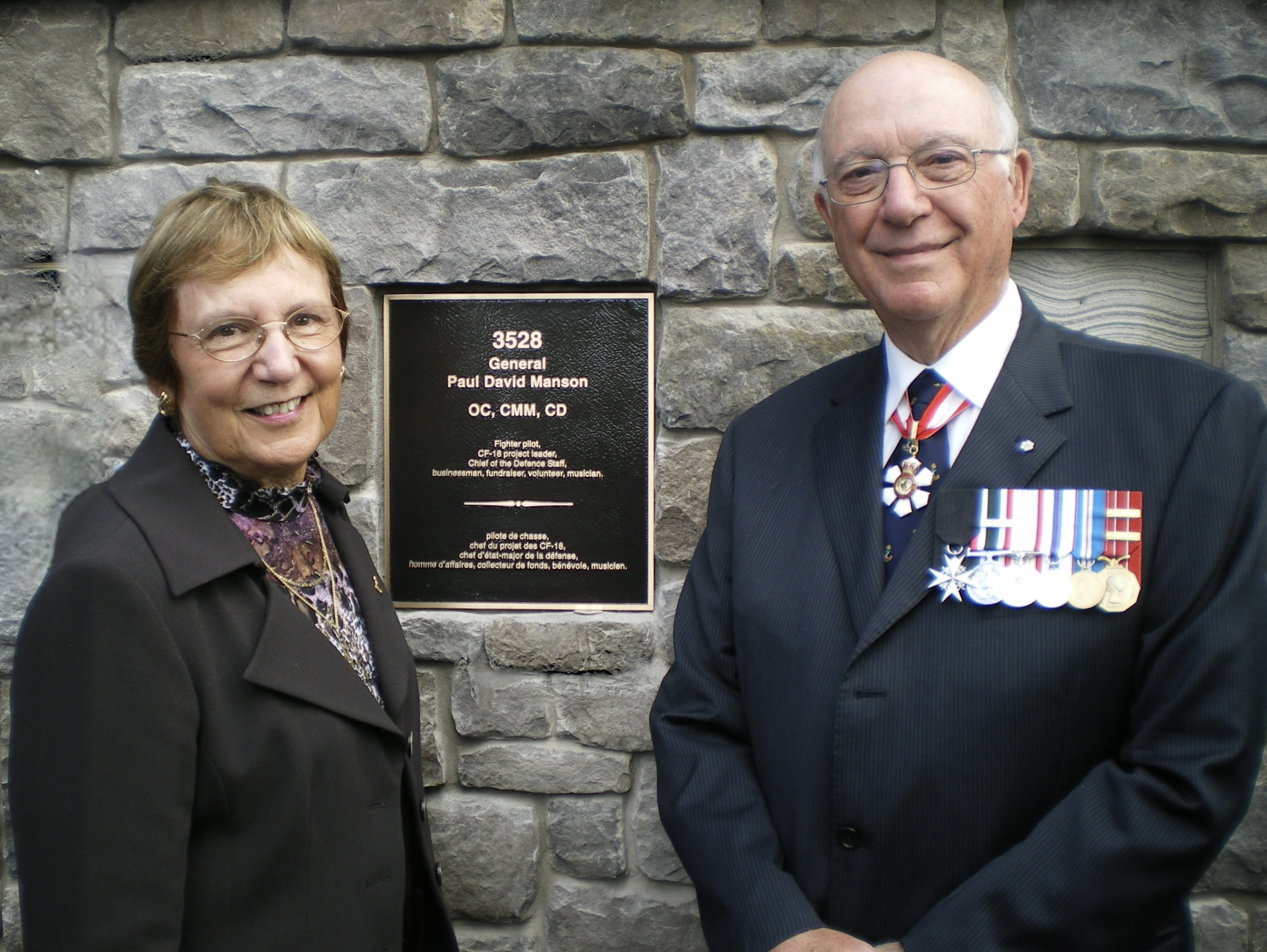
Manson with his wife

Born in Trail, British Columbia, Manson attended both Royal Roads and Royal Military College of Canada. He was appointed Cadet Wing Commander in both colleges winning the H.E. Sellars Award at Royal Roads and the Sword of Honour at RMC. After graduating from RMC in 1956, he attended Queen's University in Kingston, and received a Bachelor of Science in Electrical Engineering in 1957.

Manson was a graduate of the Canadian Forces Staff College and attended National Defence College from 1973-1974.

== Military career ==
Manson received his wings in 1957 and subsequently served as a fighter pilot in Germany, France and Canada. He flew the CF-100, F-86 Sabre, the CF-104 Starfighter and the CF-101 Voodoo. He served as Commanding Officer of 441 Tactical Fighter Squadron before becoming Program Manager of the New Fighter Aircraft Program in 1977, which led to the selection of the CF-18 Hornet. He went on to be Commander 1 Canadian Air Group in 1980, Commander, Air Command in 1983 and Assistant Deputy Minister in the Department of National Defence in 1985. In 1986, Prime Minister Brian Mulroney appointed him Canada's Chief of the Defence Staff, a position he held until his retirement from the military in 1989.

== Business career ==
Following his military service, he was the president of Paramax, a Montreal-based aerospace company, eventually retiring from business as Chairman of Lockheed Martin Canada in 1997.

== Volunteer work ==
Upon retiring from the business world, Manson worked full-time from 1997 until 2005 as volunteer Chairman of the "Passing the Torch" campaign, which raised $16.5 million in support of the new Canadian War Museum. He was on the Board of Trustees of the Canadian Museum of Civilization Corporation from 2000 to 2006, and during that time, he chaired the Canadian War Museum Committee and the Canadian War Museum Building Committee for the new museum, which opened in 2005. He was Chairman of the Aerospace Industries Association of Canada and Canada's Aviation Hall of Fame.

== Death ==
Manson died on July 1, 2023, at the age of 88.

== Honours ==
In 1980, Manson was invested as a Commander of the Order of Military Merit. In 1987 he became an Officer of the Order of St. John, and in 1989 he became a Commander of the United States Legion of Merit. He received the C.D. Howe Award in 1992 "for achievement in the fields of planning, policy-making and leadership in aeronautics and space". In 2002, he was made an Officer of the Order of Canada for being "an exemplary and inspirational military leader, business executive and volunteer" and for having "served his country with honour and distinction". In 2003, he was a recipient of the Vimy Award, which "recognizes Canadians who have made outstanding commitments to Canadian security and defence and towards preserving our democratic values." In 2009, Manson was added to the Wall of Honour at the Royal Military College of Canada, and in 2018, he was inducted into Canada's Aviation Hall of Fame. General Manson is the recipient of honorary Doctorate of Military Science degrees from both Royal Roads and Royal Military College.

== Notes ==
Military offices
Preceded by Kenneth Lewis	Commander, Air Command; 1983–1985	Succeeded by Donald McNaughton
Preceded by Gérard Charles Édouard Thériault	Chief of the Defence Staff; 1986–1989	Succeeded by John de Chastelain
