= John-James Ford =

Canadian poet and writer

John-James Ford (born 1972) is a Canadian poet and fiction writer.

Born in Kindersley, Saskatchewan, Ford studied at the Royal Military College of Canada in Kingston, Ontario, and at the University of New Brunswick in Fredericton.

His poetry and short fiction have been published in Grey Borders, Papertiger, qwerty, Carousel, Prairie Fire, stonestone, Veritas, and sub-Terrain.

His first novel Bonk on the Head was published by Nightwood Editions in 2005.

Ford won the 2006 Ottawa Book Award in the English fiction category (tied with The Sundog Season by John Geddes).

== Published works ==
- Bonk on the Head (2005)
- they call me babo (2025)
