= William J. Stewart (hydrographic surveyor) =

- Born: September 9, 1891; Ottawa, Ontario
- Died: May 5, 1925 (aged 33) Ottawa, Ontario
- Buried: Beechwood Cemetery, Ottawa
- Allegiance: Canada
- Rank: Captain
- Awards: an island, a rock and a ship were named after him
- Other work: Canada's First Chief Hydrographic Surveyor

William J. Stewart was Canada's first Chief Hydrographic Surveyor. Stewart Island, Algoma District, Ontario, and Stewart Rock, Owen Channel, Manitoulin District, Ontario, were named after him, as was the Canadian Hydrographic vessel William J. Stewart.

== Education ==
William J. Stewart was born in Ottawa on January 23, 1863, the son of a contractor in Ottawa and also Commanding Officer (Major) of the Ottawa Field Battery. He studied at Ottawa Collegiate School (now Lisgar Collegiate Institute) in Ottawa, Ontario. On February 5, 1880, at the age of 17, he joined Royal Military College of Canada (RMC) in Kingston, Ontario, having taken first place in entrance marks in his class of seventeen. As Company Sergeant-Major in the Cadet Battalion, he graduated on June 26, 1883, at the top of his class. He was presented with the Governor General of Canada's Gold Medal, awarded to the cadet standing first in General Proficiency, as determined from the date of joining to that of graduation. RMC records show that he was 5′7″ tall, with dark complexion, brown hair and hazel eyes.

== Career ==
He started work for the Rideau Canal Office, Ottawa, and joined the one-year-old Georgian Bay Survey (later to become the Canadian Hydrographic Service) on March 22, 1884, at an annual salary of $550. He took over as Canada's First Chief Hydrographic Surveyor in 1893 and continued to survey in Georgian Bay and the North Channel until 1894. In 1891, he surveyed Burrard Inlet in British Columbia. In 1895-97, he with his ship Bayfield was in Lake St. Clair, Lake Erie and Lake Huron. In 1898, he was back at Parry Sound. During 1901, he took part in the first year of the Lake Winnipeg survey, but for the next two years, he was in Lake Superior surveying with a new Bayfield. He obtained his Master's Certificate, Inland Waters in 1897, though he never commanded his own survey ship.

He was a member of the International Waterways Commission in 1909. In 1912-13, he was appointed by the Dominion Government to determine the effect of the Chicago drainage scheme on the level of the lower St. Lawrence River. At the request of the British Government, he went to Europe to assist in layout the new international boundaries as determined by the 1919 Treaty of Versailles.

== Honours ==
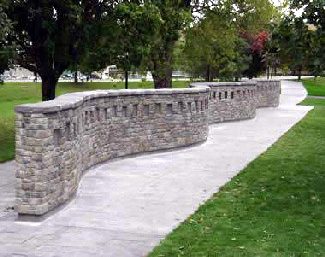
Wall of Honour, Royal Military College of Canada

To Canada's first Chief Hydrographer, Mr. R.J. Fraser wrote this tribute in later years, "about 170 navigation charts of Canada are either the product of his own skilled hand or result from the responsible planning and production during the years of his personal administration of the Service." A noble and parting tribute to a man who devoted forty-one years of his life in recharting Canada's inland and coastal waters, and to the heritage he left his successors.

He died on May 5, 1925, leaving his wife, Clara Lasher, and two unmarried daughters, Avis and Sybil. He was buried in Beechwood Cemetery, Ottawa.

In 2011, 85 William J Stewart was added to the wall of honour at the Royal Military College of Canada in Kingston, Ontario.
