= Godfrey D. Rhodes =

Canadian general (1886–1971)

Godfrey Dean Rhodes
- Born: 18 July 1886; British Columbia
- Died: 21 February 1971 (aged 84)
- Military career
- Allegiance: United Kingdom
- Branch: British Army
- Service years: 1907–1926; 1941–1944
- Rank: Brigadier-General
- Service number: 4075
- Unit: Royal Engineers
- Other work: General Manager, Kenya and Uganda Railways and Harbours, 1934-1941

Brigadier-General Sir Godfrey Dean Rhodes CB CBE DSO (18 July 1886 – 21 February 1971) was a Canadian-born and -educated soldier who served with the British Army in Canada, Turkey, Bulgaria, Kenya, Uganda, Persia-Iraq and India.

== Education ==
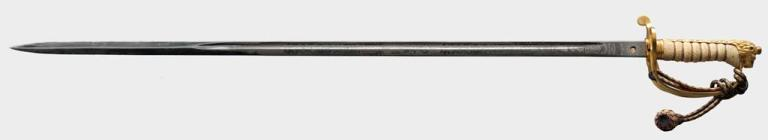
Sword of Honour at Royal Military College of Canada

He was born in Victoria, British Columbia, was educated at Trinity College School, Port Hope, Ontario. He enrolled at the Royal Military College of Canada in Kingston, Ontario from 1903 to 1907. He was first in his class, served as College Battalion Sergeant-Major in 1906–07 and won the Sword of Honour. He graduated with honours, and won the Governor-General's Gold Medal.

== Military service ==
On graduation, he was commissioned by the Imperial Army and served with the Royal Engineers. He was promoted Second Lieutenant in the Corps of Royal Engineers on 27 June 1907. He initially serviced in India with the 9 Railway Company Sappers. During the war of 1914–1918, he served in France and the Near East. Following the collapse of Turkey he went to Constantinople to take over the Turkish State Railways. He later took over the Bulgarian Railway Lines.

== Family ==
He married Marion Jessie "Mollie" Topping in July 1915 in London, England. The couple had two sons and a daughter. Rhodes was appointed General Manager, Kenya and Uganda Railways and Harbours, with effect from 30 October 1934 until he was seconded to military duty in 1941.

== Civilian career ==
As a Major with the Royal Engineers he was an associate civil engineer in Rhodes, Macpherson Fox Smith (Cape Town). Prior to World War II, he served as Chief Engineer and later General Manager of the Kenya and Uganda Railways and Harbours. He was active in the Boy Scout movement and served as Chief Scout Commissioner for Kenya prior to World War II.

While in Kenya in 1941, he oversaw the burial of Lieutenant-General The 1st Baron Baden-Powell.

== Return to military service ==
In 1941, he went to Iran, to inaugurate the "Aid to Russia" service and was known as "The Saviour of Stalingrad". Since it looked as if Iraq, Persia and Turkey would become a battle area, the British forces in these areas were strengthened. A new Command called Persia and Iraq Force (PAIFORCE) was formed in September, 1942. In 1942, he became Deputy Quartermaster General Movements and Transportation for the Persia and Iraq Force with headquarters at Baghdad. In March, 1945, he was appointed Regional Port Director of Calcutta, under the Government of India.

== Awards and recognition ==
He was appointed Companion of the Order of the Bath, Commander of the Order of the British Empire, and Companion of the Distinguished Service Order. He was mentioned in despatches three times. He received the Legion of Honour, the Order of the Redeemer, the Order of the White Eagle from Serbia. The King bestowed a Knighthood on him on 1 Jan 1934.
