= Kate Armstrong (memoirist) =

Canadian author (born 1962)

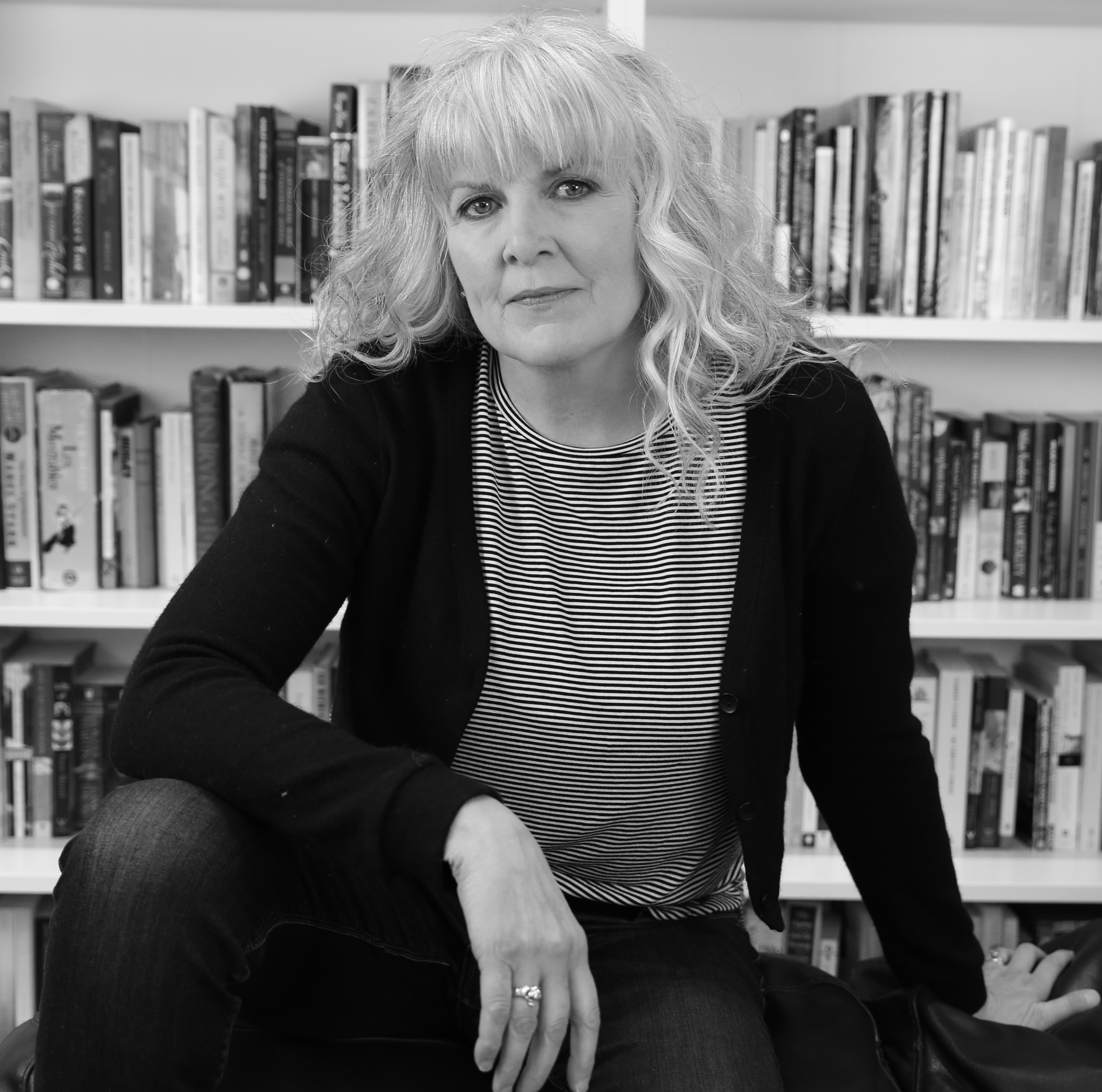
- Born: 1962 (age 63–64); Flin Flon, Manitoba, Canada
- Education: University of British Columbia MFA in Creative Writing; Royal Military College of Canada
- Occupation: Writer
- Known for: Member of the first cohort of female officer cadets to graduate from The Royal Military College of Canada in Kingston, Ontario in the Class of 1984; First woman to be assigned a cadet College number at RMC: 14390.
- Notable work: The Stone Frigate: The Royal Military College's First Female Cadet Speaks Out (Dundurn Press 2019) https://www.dundurn.com/books_/t22117/a9781459744059-the-stone-frigate
- Awards: Winner of the 2019-20 Ontario Historical Society Alison Prentice Award; Finalist for the 2020 Kobo Emerging Writer Nonfiction Prize

Kate Armstrong (born 1962) is a Canadian author. She won the Ontario Historical Society Alison Prentice Award for her debut memoir, The Stone Frigate: The Royal Military College's First Female Cadet Speaks Out (Dundurn Press 2019) and was a finalist for the 2020 Kobo Emerging Writer Nonfiction Prize.

== Biography ==
Kathryn Anne Armstrong was born in Flin Flon, Manitoba; her father worked for Eaton's Catalogue and moved the family frequently due to his work. Armstrong spent the majority of her childhood in British Columbia: Kelowna, Fort St John, Williams Lake, Vernon, and Abbotsford. She studied commerce at the Royal Military College in Kingston Ontario, where she was the first woman to receive a cadet College number: 14390. She graduated in the Class of 1984.

Captain (Ret'd) K.A. Armstrong, CD, served as a Supply Logistics Officer (Air) in the Canadian Armed Forces (1980–1993) at CFB Kingston, NDHQ Ottawa, and 1CFSD Toronto. Upon her release, Armstrong moved to Vancouver, BC, and worked for BC Hydro (1993–2013). She started in Labour Relations, and later worked as a Customer Service Area Manager and a Transmission Scheduling Manager. Eventually Armstrong transferred to the wholly owned subsidiary of Powerex Corp, and worked in the newly deregulated electricity market, at first as a Real Time Electricity Trader and later as a Marketing Manager negotiating long term electricity trade and renewable energy deals.

In 2013, Armstrong left her corporate career to pursue her dream of becoming a writer.

== The Stone Frigate ==
In 1980, Armstrong was in the first small cohort of female officer candidates attending Canada's official military academy. She encountered harassment there. In 2019, she published The Stone Frigate: The Royal Military College's First Female Cadet Speaks Out, about her experiences at RMC. The book was nominated for a Kobo Emerging Writer Prize. In 2020, the Ontario Historical Society gave the book its 2019–2020 Alison Prentice Award.

According to the Abbotsford News Armstrong learned that a group of older students targeted her, and tried to "break" her, because they saw her as having leadership material.

A March 2019 review in the eVeritas, a publication for the students and alumni of Canadian Military Colleges, said Armstrong went to the Royal Military College as a way to "escape from a traumatic childhood". The review praises Armstrong for choosing not to apply a "modern lens" to practices that were routine decades ago: "The author does not apply a modern lens, nor does she claim RMC to have been any worse or better than anywhere else. She simply tells the truth: what was done to her and her peers, how it made her feel, and how it impacted her life. A courageous act."

Armstrong and 31 other women had been enabled to attend RMC by the passage of the Canadian Human Rights Act. Armstrong and 20 other female officer candidates graduated and became officers.

== Works ==
- The Stone Frigate : The Royal Military College's First Female Cadet Speaks Out (2019)

== Awards and honours ==
- 2020: The Stone Frigate was winner of the 2019-20 Ontario Historical Society Alison Prentice Award
- 2020: The Stone Frigate was a finalist for the 2020 Kobo Emerging Writer Nonfiction Prize

== Personal life ==
Armstrong lives in Nelson, British Columbia, with her husband, Rick, and their three black Labrador retrievers. Armstrong received her Master of Fine Arts in Creative Writing Degree from the University of British Columbia in 2025 and is working on her first novel.
