= Charles Frederick Carson =

Canadian soldier and engineer

Sir Frederick Carson
- Born: Charles Frederick Carson; 10 February 1886; Kingston, Ontario
- Died: 3 May 1960 (aged 74); Montreal, Canada
- Military career
- Allegiance: United Kingdom
- Branch: British Army
- Rank: Brigadier
- Service number: 4250
- Unit: Royal Engineers

Brigadier Sir Charles Frederick Carson CBE MC (10 February 1886 – 3 May 1960) was a Canadian soldier and engineer who saw active service in both World Wars as a member of the British Army.

== Education ==
Carson was born in Kingston, Ontario, the son of Canadians Robert James Carson and Emma Lavinia Casey. He was enrolled at the Royal Military College of Canada in from 1905 to 1909. He served as college battalion sergeant-major in 1907–08.

== Military service ==
Carson was commissioned as a regular officer of the Royal Engineers. He was posted to India in 1911 with the 9 Railway Company Sappers. He served as general manager of the North West Railway of India. During the First World War, he served in France and was awarded the Military Cross in 1917:

For conspicuous gallantry and devotion to duty. He was responsible for building a cavalry track enabling the cavalry to pass through and beyond the infantry during an attack. Having successfully completed his work under heavy artillery fire, he went forward and reconnoitred a crossing over a river under very heavy fire of all kinds, and brought back most valuable information. His fearless example and determination throughout were admirable.

— London Gazette, 11 October 1918

In 1941, he served as director of transportation, 10th Army, with headquarters at Baghdad with the Persia-Iraq Force in the maintenance of railways. Since it looked as if Iraq, Persia and Turkey would become a battle area during World War II, the British forces in these areas were strengthened. A new command called Persia and Iraq Force (PAIFORCE) was formed in September, 1942, with headquarters at Baghdad. Carson served as director of transportation for Iraq and Persia.

== Civilian career ==
Carson was appointed executive vice president of Montreal Locomotive Works Ltd, manufacturers and suppliers from 1944 to 1951.

== Awards and recognition ==
Carson was knighted in the 1941 New Year Honours for his work on railways. He was appointed Commander of the Order of the British Empire in 1943 in recognition of his services in Persia-Iraq. He was awarded a MC in the 1917 New Year Honours.

== Family ==
Carson married Dorothy Anne Brownfield, with whom he had three sons, Colonel Robert John Carson, Colonel Frederick Sinclair Carson and Peter James Carson, and a daughter, Patricia.
