= William Kirby Lye =

Canadian soldier

- Nickname: Bill
- Born: 1918; Ottawa, Ontario
- Died: 2009 (aged 90–91) Ottawa, Ontario
- Allegiance: Canada
- Branch: Canadian Forces.
- Service years: 1936-1973
- Rank: Brigadier General
- Commands: RMC
- Awards: MBE CD, ADC
- Other work: educator

Brigadier General William Kirby Lye OBE (1918-2009) was a Canadian soldier.

== Education ==
Lye's father O. G. Lye was the officer commanding the 11th Field Regiment R.F and former mayor of Guelph, Ontario. Lye was raised in Guelph and attended the Royal Military College (RMC) from 1936.

== Career ==
Lye served in Canada from the start of the Second World Was until posted overseas in 1941 with 16th Field Company. He was later Second-in-Command of 1st Field Company. In England, he served as Chief Instructor of the Engineer Reinforcement Unit. In 1944, he served as Staff Officer Royal Engineers, Headquarters 2 Canadian Corps; he returned to Canada in June 1945. BGen Lye's post-war appointments include: Deputy Commander, Canadian Forces Base Units, Middle East (United Nations Emergency Force); Commander, Camp Chilliwack and Commandant, Royal Canadian School of Military Engineering; Commander Canadian Base Units (Europe); Commander, Nova Scotia and Prince Edward Island Area; Chief of Staff, Administration, at Headquarters Mobile Command; Senior Assistant Adjutant General and Director General Ordnance Systems and Director General Land Operations in Canadian Forces Headquarters. BGen Lye retired in 1973 after his assignment as Commandant RMC in Kingston.

== Honours ==
He was Mentioned in Despatches and appointed a Member of the Order of the British Empire for his distinguished service in 1944 as Staff Officer Royal Engineers, Headquarters 2 Canadian Corps. Lake Lye in the Chilcotin Training Area near Williams Lake, British Columbia is named in his honour.

Academic offices
Preceded by William W. Turner	Commandant of the Royal Military College of Canada; 1970-1973	Succeeded by Commodore W.P. Hayes
