= List of 1989 Canadian incumbents =

== Crown ==
- Head of State - Queen Elizabeth II

== Federal government ==
- Governor General - Jeanne Sauvé

=== Cabinet ===
- Prime Minister - Brian Mulroney
- Deputy Prime Minister - Don Mazankowski
- Minister of Finance - Michael Wilson
- Secretary of State for External Affairs - Joe Clark
- Secretary of State for Canada - Lucien Bouchard then Gerry Weiner
- Minister of National Defence - Perrin Beatty then Bill McKnight
- Minister of National Health and Welfare - Jake Epp then Perrin Beatty
- Minister of Regional Industrial Expansion - Robert de Cotret then Harvie André
- Minister of the Environment - Lucien Bouchard
- Minister of Justice - Joe Clark (acting) then Doug Lewis
- Minister of Transport - Benoît Bouchard
- Minister of Communications - Lowell Murray (acting) then Marcel Masse
- Minister of Fisheries and Oceans - Tom Siddon
- Minister of Agriculture - Don Mazankowski
- Minister of Public Works - Otto Jelinek then Elmer MacKay
- Minister of Employment and Immigration - Barbara McDougall
- Minister of Indian Affairs and Northern Development - Bill McKnight then Pierre Cadieux
- Minister of Energy, Mines and Resources - Marcel Masse then Jake Epp
- Minister of Veterans Affairs - Gerald Merrithew

== Parliament ==
See: 34th Canadian parliament

=== Party leaders ===
- Progressive Conservative Party of Canada - Brian Mulroney
- Liberal Party of Canada - John Turner
- New Democratic Party- Ed Broadbent then Audrey McLaughlin
- Reform Party of Canada - Preston Manning

=== Supreme Court Justices ===
- Chief Justice: Brian Dickson
- William McIntyre then Beverley McLachlin
- Bertha Wilson
- Antonio Lamer
- Gérard V. La Forest
- John Sopinka
- Jean Beetz then Peter deCarteret Cory
- Claire L'Heureux-Dubé
- Gerald Eric Le Dain then Charles D. Gonthier

=== Other ===
- Speaker of the House of Commons - John Allen Fraser
- Governor of the Bank of Canada - John Crow
- Chief of the Defence Staff - General P.D. Manson then General John de Chastelain

== Provinces ==
=== Premiers ===
- Premier of Alberta - Don Getty
- Premier of British Columbia - Bill Vander Zalm
- Premier of Manitoba - Gary Filmon
- Premier of New Brunswick - Frank McKenna
- Premier of Newfoundland - Brian Peckford then Thomas Rideout then Clyde Wells
- Premier of Nova Scotia - John Buchanan
- Premier of Ontario - David Peterson
- Premier of Prince Edward Island - Joe Ghiz
- Premier of Quebec - Robert Bourassa
- Premier of Saskatchewan - Grant Devine
- Premier of the Northwest Territories - Dennis Patterson
- Premier of Yukon - Tony Penikett

=== Lieutenant-governors ===
- Lieutenant-Governor of Alberta - Helen Hunley
- Lieutenant-Governor of British Columbia - David Lam
- Lieutenant-Governor of Manitoba - George Johnson
- Lieutenant-Governor of New Brunswick - Gilbert Finn
- Lieutenant-Governor of Newfoundland and Labrador - James Aloysius McGrath
- Lieutenant-Governor of Nova Scotia -Alan Abraham then Lloyd Roseville Crouse
- Lieutenant-Governor of Ontario - Lincoln Alexander
- Lieutenant-Governor of Prince Edward Island - Robert Lloyd George MacPhail
- Lieutenant-Governor of Quebec - Gilles Lamontagne
- Lieutenant-Governor of Saskatchewan - Sylvia Fedoruk

== Mayors ==
- Toronto - Art Eggleton
- Montreal - Jean Doré
- Vancouver - Gordon Campbell
- Ottawa - James A. Durrell

== Religious leaders ==
- Roman Catholic Bishop of Quebec - Cardinal Archbishop Louis-Albert Vachon
- Roman Catholic Bishop of Montreal - Cardinal Archbishop Paul Grégoire
- Roman Catholic Bishops of London - Bishop John Michael Sherlock
- Moderator of the United Church of Canada - Sang Chul Lee

== See also ==
- 1988 Canadian incumbents
- Events in Canada in 1989
- 1990 Canadian incumbents
- Governmental leaders in 1989
- Canadian incumbents by year
