= List of 1990 Canadian incumbents =

== Crown ==
- Head of State - Queen Elizabeth II

== Federal government ==
- Governor General - Jeanne Sauvé then Ray Hnatyshyn

=== Cabinet ===
- Prime Minister - Brian Mulroney
- Deputy Prime Minister - Don Mazankowski
- Minister of Finance - Michael Wilson
- Secretary of State for External Affairs - Joe Clark
- Secretary of State for Canada - Gerry Weiner
- Minister of National Defence - Bill McKnight
- Minister of National Health and Welfare - Perrin Beatty
- Minister of Industry, Science and Technology - Benoît Bouchard (position created February 23, 1990)
- Minister of Regional Industrial Expansion - Harvie André (position discontinued February 22, 1990)
- Minister of the Environment - Lucien Bouchard then Frank Oberle (interim) then Robert de Cotret
- Minister of Justice - Doug Lewis then Kim Campbell
- Minister of Transport - Benoît Bouchard then Doug Lewis
- Minister of Communications - Marcel Masse
- Minister of Fisheries and Oceans - Tom Siddon then Bernard Valcourt
- Minister of Agriculture - Don Mazankowski
- Minister of Public Works - Elmer MacKay
- Minister of Employment and Immigration - Barbara McDougall
- Minister of Indian Affairs and Northern Development - Pierre Cadieux then Tom Siddon
- Minister of Energy, Mines and Resources - Jake Epp
- Minister of Forestry - Frank Oberle (position was created on February 23, 1990)
- Minister of Veterans Affairs - Gerry Merrithew

== Parliament ==
See: 34th Canadian parliament

=== Party leaders ===
- Progressive Conservative Party of Canada - Brian Mulroney
- Liberal Party of Canada - John Turner then Jean Chrétien
- Bloc Québécois - Lucien Bouchard (party first formed May 21, 1990)
- New Democratic Party- Audrey McLaughlin
- Reform Party of Canada - Preston Manning

=== Supreme Court Justices ===
- Chief Justice: Brian Dickson then (from July 1) Antonio Lamer
- Beverley McLachlin
- Bertha Wilson
- William Stevenson (arrived on September 17, to replace Lamer who had previously been promoted to Chief Justice)
- Gérard V. La Forest
- John Sopinka
- Peter deCarteret Cory
- Claire L'Heureux-Dubé
- Charles D. Gonthier

=== Other ===
- Speaker of the House of Commons - John Allen Fraser
- Governor of the Bank of Canada - John Crow
- Chief of the Defence Staff - General John de Chastelain

== Provinces ==
=== Premiers ===
- Premier of Alberta - Don Getty
- Premier of British Columbia - Bill Vander Zalm
- Premier of Manitoba - Gary Filmon
- Premier of New Brunswick - Frank McKenna
- Premier of Newfoundland - Clyde Wells
- Premier of Nova Scotia - John Buchanan then Roger Bacon
- Premier of Ontario - David Peterson then Bob Rae
- Premier of Prince Edward Island - Joe Ghiz
- Premier of Quebec - Robert Bourassa
- Premier of Saskatchewan - Grant Devine
- Premier of the Northwest Territories - Dennis Patterson
- Premier of Yukon - Tony Penikett

=== Lieutenant-governors ===
- Lieutenant-Governor of Alberta - Helen Hunley
- Lieutenant-Governor of British Columbia - David Lam
- Lieutenant-Governor of Manitoba - George Johnson
- Lieutenant-Governor of New Brunswick - Gilbert Finn
- Lieutenant-Governor of Newfoundland and Labrador - James Aloysius McGrath
- Lieutenant-Governor of Nova Scotia - Lloyd Roseville Crouse
- Lieutenant-Governor of Ontario - Lincoln Alexander
- Lieutenant-Governor of Prince Edward Island - Robert Lloyd George MacPhail then Marion Reid
- Lieutenant-Governor of Quebec - Gilles Lamontagne then Martial Asselin
- Lieutenant-Governor of Saskatchewan - Sylvia Fedoruk

== Mayors ==
- Toronto - Art Eggleton
- Montreal - Jean Doré
- Vancouver - Gordon Campbell
- Ottawa - James A. Durrell

== Religious leaders ==
- Roman Catholic Bishop of Quebec - Cardinal Archbishop Louis-Albert Vachon then Archbishop Maurice Couture
- Roman Catholic Bishop of Montreal - Cardinal Archbishop Paul Grégoire then Cardinal Archbishop Jean-Claude Turcotte
- Roman Catholic Bishops of London - Bishop John Michael Sherlock
- Moderator of the United Church of Canada - Sang Chul Lee then Walter H. Farquharson

== See also ==
- 1989 Canadian incumbents
- Events in Canada in 1990
- 1991 Canadian incumbents
- Governmental leaders in 1990
- Canadian incumbents by year
