= List of 1986 Canadian incumbents =

== Crown ==
- Head of State - Queen Elizabeth II

== Federal government ==
- Governor General - Jeanne Sauvé

=== Cabinet ===
- Prime Minister - Brian Mulroney
- Deputy Prime Minister - Erik Nielsen then Don Mazankowski
- Minister of Finance - Michael Wilson
- Secretary of State for External Affairs - Joe Clark
- Secretary of State for Canada - Benoît Bouchard then David Crombie
- Minister of National Defence - Erik Nielsen then Perrin Beatty
- Minister of National Health and Welfare - Jake Epp
- Minister of Regional Industrial Expansion - Sinclair Stevens then Don Mazankowski (acting) then Michel Côté
- Minister of the Environment - Thomas McMillan
- Minister of Justice - John Crosbie then Ray Hnatyshyn
- Minister of Transport - Don Mazankowski then John Crosbie
- Minister of Communications - Marcel Masse then Flora MacDonald
- Minister of Fisheries and Oceans - Tom Siddon
- Minister of Agriculture - John Wise
- Minister of Public Works - Roch LaSalle then Stewart McInnes
- Minister of Employment and Immigration - Flora MacDonald then Benoît Bouchard
- Minister of Indian Affairs and Northern Development - David Crombie then Bill McKnight
- Minister of Energy, Mines and Resources - Pat Carney then Marcel Masse
- Minister of State (Forestry) - Gerald Merrithew

== Parliament ==
See: 33rd Canadian parliament

=== Party leaders ===
- Progressive Conservative Party of Canada - Brian Mulroney
- Liberal Party of Canada - John Turner
- New Democratic Party- Ed Broadbent

=== Supreme Court Justices ===
- Chief Justice: Brian Dickson
- William McIntyre
- Bertha Wilson
- Antonio Lamer
- Gérard V. La Forest
- John Sopinka
- Jean Beetz
- Julien Chouinard
- Gerald Eric Le Dain

=== Other ===
- Speaker of the House of Commons - John William Bosley then John Allen Fraser
- Governor of the Bank of Canada - Gerald Bouey
- Chief of the Defence Staff - General G.C.E. Thériault then General P.D. Manson

== Provinces ==
=== Premiers ===
- Premier of Alberta - Don Getty
- Premier of British Columbia - Bill Bennett then Bill Vander Zalm
- Premier of Manitoba - Howard Pawley
- Premier of New Brunswick - Richard Hatfield
- Premier of Newfoundland - Brian Peckford
- Premier of Nova Scotia - John Buchanan
- Premier of Ontario - David Peterson
- Premier of Prince Edward Island - James Lee then Joe Ghiz
- Premier of Quebec - Robert Bourassa
- Premier of Saskatchewan - Grant Devine

=== Lieutenant-governors ===
- Lieutenant-Governor of Alberta - Helen Hunley
- Lieutenant-Governor of British Columbia - Robert Gordon Rogers
- Lieutenant-Governor of Manitoba - Pearl McGonigal then George Johnson
- Lieutenant-Governor of New Brunswick - George F.G. Stanley
- Lieutenant-Governor of Newfoundland and Labrador - William Anthony Paddon then James Aloysius McGrath
- Lieutenant-Governor of Nova Scotia -Alan Abraham
- Lieutenant-Governor of Ontario - Lincoln Alexander
- Lieutenant-Governor of Prince Edward Island - Robert Lloyd George MacPhail
- Lieutenant-Governor of Quebec - Gilles Lamontagne
- Lieutenant-Governor of Saskatchewan - Sylvia Fedoruk

== Mayors ==
- Toronto - Art Eggleton
- Montreal - Jean Drapeau then Jean Doré
- Vancouver - Michael Harcourt then Gordon Campbell
- Ottawa - James A. Durrell

== Religious leaders ==
- Roman Catholic Bishop of Quebec - Cardinal Archbishop Louis-Albert Vachon
- Roman Catholic Bishop of Montreal - Cardinal Archbishop Paul Grégoire
- Roman Catholic Bishops of London - Bishop John Michael Sherlock
- Moderator of the United Church of Canada - Robert F. Smith then Anne M. Squire

== See also ==
- 1985 Canadian incumbents
- Events in Canada in 1986
- 1987 Canadian incumbents
- Governmental leaders in 1986
- Canadian incumbents by year
