= List of 1991 Canadian incumbents =

== Crown ==
- Head of State - Queen Elizabeth II

== Federal government ==
- Governor General - Ray Hnatyshyn

=== Cabinet ===
- Prime Minister - Brian Mulroney
- Deputy Prime Minister - Don Mazankowski
- Minister of Finance - Michael Wilson then Don Mazankowski
- Secretary of State for External Affairs - Joe Clark then Barbara McDougall
- Minister of National Defence - Bill McKnight then Marcel Masse
- Minister of National Health and Welfare - Perrin Beatty then Benoît Bouchard
- Minister of Industry, Science and Technology - Benoît Bouchard then Michael Wilson
- Minister of the Environment - Robert de Cotret then Jean Charest
- Minister of Justice - Kim Campbell
- Minister of Transport - Doug Lewis then Jean Corbeil
- Minister of Communications - Marcel Masse then Perrin Beatty
- Minister of Fisheries and Oceans - Bernard Valcourt then John Crosbie
- Minister of Agriculture - Don Mazankowski then Bill McKnight
- Minister of Public Works - Elmer MacKay
- Minister of Employment and Immigration - Barbara McDougall then Bernard Valcourt
- Minister of Energy, Mines and Resources - Jake Epp
- Minister of Forestry - Frank Oberle
- Minister of Veterans Affairs - Gerry Merrithew

== Parliament ==
See: 34th Canadian parliament

=== Party leaders ===
- Progressive Conservative Party of Canada - Brian Mulroney
- Liberal Party of Canada - Jean Chrétien
- Bloc Québécois - Lucien Bouchard
- New Democratic Party- Audrey McLaughlin
- Reform Party of Canada - Preston Manning

=== Supreme Court justices ===
- Chief Justice: Antonio Lamer
- Beverley McLachlin
- Bertha Wilson then Frank Iacobucci
- William Stevenson
- Gérard V. La Forest
- John Sopinka
- Peter deCarteret Cory
- Claire L'Heureux-Dubé
- Charles D. Gonthier

=== Other ===
- Speaker of the House of Commons - John Allen Fraser
- Governor of the Bank of Canada - John Crow
- Chief of the Defence Staff - General John de Chastelain

== Provinces and territories ==
=== Premiers ===
- Premier of Alberta - Don Getty
- Premier of British Columbia - Bill Vander Zalm then Rita Johnston then Michael Harcourt
- Premier of Manitoba - Gary Filmon
- Premier of New Brunswick - Frank McKenna
- Premier of Newfoundland - Clyde Wells
- Premier of Nova Scotia - Roger Bacon then Donald Cameron
- Premier of Ontario - Bob Rae
- Premier of Prince Edward Island - Joe Ghiz
- Premier of Quebec - Robert Bourassa
- Premier of Saskatchewan - Grant Devine then Roy Romanow
- Premier of the Northwest Territories - Dennis Patterson then Nellie Cournoyea
- Premier of Yukon - Tony Penikett

=== Lieutenant-governors ===
- Lieutenant-Governor of Alberta - Helen Hunley then Gordon Towers
- Lieutenant-Governor of British Columbia - David Lam
- Lieutenant-Governor of Manitoba - George Johnson
- Lieutenant-Governor of New Brunswick - Gilbert Finn
- Lieutenant-Governor of Newfoundland and Labrador - James Aloysius McGrath then Frederick Russell
- Lieutenant-Governor of Nova Scotia - Lloyd Roseville Crouse
- Lieutenant-Governor of Ontario - Lincoln Alexander then Hal Jackman
- Lieutenant-Governor of Prince Edward Island - Marion Reid
- Lieutenant-Governor of Quebec - Martial Asselin
- Lieutenant-Governor of Saskatchewan - Sylvia Fedoruk

== Mayors ==
- Toronto - Art Eggleton, then June Rowlands
- Montreal - Jean Doré
- Vancouver - Gordon Campbell
- Ottawa - James A. Durrell then Marc Laviolette then Jacquelin Holzman

== Religious leaders ==
- Roman Catholic Bishop of Quebec - Archbishop Maurice Couture
- Roman Catholic Bishop of Montreal - Cardinal Archbishop Jean-Claude Turcotte
- Roman Catholic Bishops of London - Bishop John Michael Sherlock
- Moderator of the United Church of Canada - Walter H. Farquharson

== See also ==
- 1990 Canadian incumbents
- Events in Canada in 1991
- 1992 Canadian incumbents
- Governmental leaders in 1991
- Canadian incumbents by year
