= List of 1993 Canadian incumbents =

== Crown ==
- Head of State – Queen Elizabeth II

== Federal government ==
- Governor General – Ray Hnatyshyn

=== Progressive Conservative Cabinet (until November 3) ===
- Prime Minister – Brian Mulroney then Kim Campbell
- Deputy Prime Minister – Don Mazankowski then Jean Charest
- Minister of Finance – Don Mazankowski then Gilles Loiselle
- Secretary of State for External Affairs – Barbara McDougall then Perrin Beatty
- Minister of National Defence – Marcel Masse then Kim Campbell then Tom Siddon
- Minister of National Health and Welfare – Benoît Bouchard then Mary Collins
- Minister of Industry, Science and Technology – Michael Wilson then Jean Charest
- Minister of the Environment – Jean Charest then Pierre Vincent
- Minister of Justice – Kim Campbell then Pierre Blais
- Minister of Transport – Jean Corbeil
- Minister of Communications – Perrin Beatty then Monique Landry
- Minister of Fisheries and Oceans – John Crosbie then Ross Reid
- Minister of Agriculture – Bill McKnight then Charlie Mayer
- Minister of Public Works – Elmer MacKay then Paul Wyatt Dick
- Minister of Employment and Immigration – Bernard Valcourt
- Minister of Energy, Mines and Resources – Arthur Jacob Epp then Bill McKnight then Bobbie Sparrow
- Minister of Forestry – Frank Oberle then Bobbie Sparrow
- Minister of Veterans Affairs – Gerald Merrithew

=== Liberal Cabinet (from November 4) ===
- Prime Minister – Jean Chrétien
- Deputy Prime Minister – Sheila Copps
- Minister of Finance – Paul Martin
- Secretary of State for External Affairs – André Ouellet
- Minister of National Defence – David Collenette
- Minister of National Health and Welfare – Diane Marleau
- Minister of Industry, Science and Technology – John Manley
- Minister of Intergovernmental Affairs – Marcel Massé
- Minister of the Environment – Sheila Copps
- Minister of Justice – Allan Rock
- Minister of Transport – Doug Young
- Minister of Communications – Michel Dupuy
- Minister of Fisheries and Oceans – Brian Tobin
- Minister of Agriculture – Ralph Goodale
- Minister of Public Works – David Dingwall
- Minister of Employment and Immigration – Lloyd Axworthy
- Minister of Energy, Mines and Resources – Anne McLellan
- Minister of Forestry – Anne McLellan

== Parliament ==
See: 34th Canadian parliament then 35th Canadian parliament

=== Party leaders ===
- Bloc Québécois – Lucien Bouchard
- Liberal Party of Canada – Jean Chrétien
- New Democratic Party- Audrey McLaughlin
- Progressive Conservative Party of Canada – Brian Mulroney then Kim Campbell then Jean Charest
- Reform Party of Canada – Preston Manning

=== Supreme Court Justices ===
- Chief Justice: Antonio Lamer
- Beverley McLachlin
- Frank Iacobucci
- John C. Major
- Gérard La Forest
- John Sopinka
- Peter deCarteret Cory
- Claire L'Heureux-Dubé
- Charles D. Gonthier

=== Other ===
- Speaker of the House of Commons – John Allen Fraser
- Governor of the Bank of Canada – John Crow
- Chief of the Defence Staff – General John de Chastelain then Admiral John Anderson

== Provinces ==
=== Premiers ===
- Premier of Alberta – Ralph Klein
- Premier of British Columbia – Mike Harcourt
- Premier of Manitoba – Gary Filmon
- Premier of New Brunswick – Frank McKenna
- Premier of Newfoundland – Clyde Wells
- Premier of Nova Scotia – Donald Cameron then John Savage
- Premier of Ontario – Bob Rae
- Premier of Prince Edward Island – Joe Ghiz then Catherine Callbeck
- Premier of Quebec – Robert Bourassa
- Premier of Saskatchewan – Roy Romanow
- Premier of the Northwest Territories – Nellie Cournoyea
- Premier of Yukon – John Ostashek

=== Lieutenant-governors ===
- Lieutenant-Governor of Alberta – Gordon Towers
- Lieutenant-Governor of British Columbia – David Lam
- Lieutenant-Governor of Manitoba – Yvon Dumont then George Johnson
- Lieutenant-Governor of New Brunswick – Gilbert Finn
- Lieutenant-Governor of Newfoundland and Labrador – Frederick Russell
- Lieutenant-Governor of Nova Scotia – Lloyd Roseville Crouse
- Lieutenant-Governor of Ontario – Hal Jackman
- Lieutenant-Governor of Prince Edward Island – Marion Reid
- Lieutenant-Governor of Quebec – Martial Asselin
- Lieutenant-Governor of Saskatchewan – Sylvia Fedoruk

== Mayors ==
- Toronto – June Rowlands
- Montreal – Jean Doré
- Vancouver – Gordon Campbell then Philip Owen
- Ottawa – Jacquelin Holzman

== Religious leaders ==
- Roman Catholic Bishop of Quebec – Archbishop Maurice Couture
- Roman Catholic Bishop of Montreal – Cardinal Archbishop Jean-Claude Turcotte
- Roman Catholic Bishops of London – Bishop John Michael Sherlock
- Moderator of the United Church of Canada – Stan McKay

== See also ==
- 1992 Canadian incumbents
- Events in Canada in 1993
- 1994 Canadian incumbents
- Governmental leaders in 1993
- Canadian incumbents by year
