= List of 1994 Canadian incumbents =

== Crown ==
- Head of State – Queen Elizabeth II

== Federal government ==
- Governor General – Ray Hnatyshyn

=== Cabinet ===
- Prime Minister – Jean Chrétien
- Deputy Prime Minister – Sheila Copps
- Minister of Finance – Paul Martin
- Secretary of State for External Affairs – André Ouellet
- Minister of National Defence – David Collenette
- Minister of National Health and Welfare – Diane Marleau
- Minister of Industry, Science and Technology – John Manley
- Minister of Intergovernmental Affairs – Marcel Massé
- Minister of the Environment – Sheila Copps
- Minister of Justice – Allan Rock
- Minister of Transport – Doug Young
- Minister of Communications – Michel Dupuy
- Minister of Citizenship and Immigration – Sergio Marchi (position created June 30, 1994)
- Minister of Fisheries and Oceans – Brian Tobin
- Minister of Agriculture – Ralph Goodale
- Minister of Public Works – David Dingwall
- Minister of Employment and Immigration – Lloyd Axworthy
- Minister of Energy, Mines and Resources – Anne McLellan
- Minister of Forestry – Anne McLellan

== Members of Parliament ==
See: 35th Canadian parliament

=== Party leaders ===
- Liberal Party of Canada – Jean Chrétien
- Bloc Québécois – Lucien Bouchard
- New Democratic Party – Audrey McLaughlin
- Progressive Conservative Party of Canada – Jean Charest
- Reform Party of Canada – Preston Manning

=== Supreme Court Justices ===
- Chief Justice: Antonio Lamer
- Beverley McLachlin
- Frank Iacobucci
- John C. Major
- Gérard V. La Forest
- John Sopinka
- Peter deCarteret Cory
- Claire L'Heureux-Dubé
- Charles D. Gonthier

=== Other ===
- Speaker of the House of Commons – John Allen Fraser then Gilbert Parent
- Governor of the Bank of Canada – John Crow then Gordon Thiessen
- Chief of the Defence Staff – General John de Chastelain General Jean Boyle

== Provinces ==
=== Premiers ===
- Premier of Alberta – Ralph Klein
- Premier of British Columbia – Mike Harcourt
- Premier of Manitoba – Gary Filmon
- Premier of New Brunswick – Frank McKenna
- Premier of Newfoundland – Clyde Wells
- Premier of Nova Scotia – John Savage
- Premier of Ontario – Bob Rae
- Premier of Prince Edward Island – Catherine Callbeck
- Premier of Quebec – Robert Bourassa then Daniel Johnson, Jr. then Jacques Parizeau
- Premier of Saskatchewan – Roy Romanow
- Premier of the Northwest Territories – Nellie Cournoyea
- Premier of Yukon – John Ostashek

=== Lieutenant-governors ===
- Lieutenant-Governor of Alberta – Gordon Towers
- Lieutenant-Governor of British Columbia – David Lam
- Lieutenant-Governor of Manitoba – Yvon Dumont
- Lieutenant-Governor of New Brunswick – Gilbert Finn then Margaret Norrie McCain
- Lieutenant-Governor of Newfoundland and Labrador – Frederick Russell
- Lieutenant-Governor of Nova Scotia – Lloyd Roseville Crouse then James Kinley
- Lieutenant-Governor of Ontario – Hal Jackman
- Lieutenant-Governor of Prince Edward Island – Marion Reid
- Lieutenant-Governor of Quebec – Martial Asselin
- Lieutenant-Governor of Saskatchewan – Sylvia Fedoruk then Jack Wiebe

== Mayors ==
- Toronto – Barbara Hall
- Montreal – Jean Doré then Pierre Bourque
- Vancouver – Philip Owen
- Ottawa – Jacquelin Holzman

== Religious leaders ==
- Roman Catholic Bishop of Quebec – Archbishop Maurice Couture
- Roman Catholic Bishop of Montreal – Cardinal Archbishop Jean-Claude Turcotte
- Roman Catholic Bishops of London – Bishop John Michael Sherlock
- Moderator of the United Church of Canada – Stan McKay then Marion Best

== See also ==
- 1993 Canadian incumbents
- Events in Canada in 1994
- 1995 Canadian incumbents
- Governmental leaders in 1994
- Canadian incumbents by year
