= Carmen Lansdowne =

Former Moderator of the United Church of Canada 2022–2025

The Very Reverend Dr. Carmen Lansdowne
- 44th Moderator of the United Church of Canada
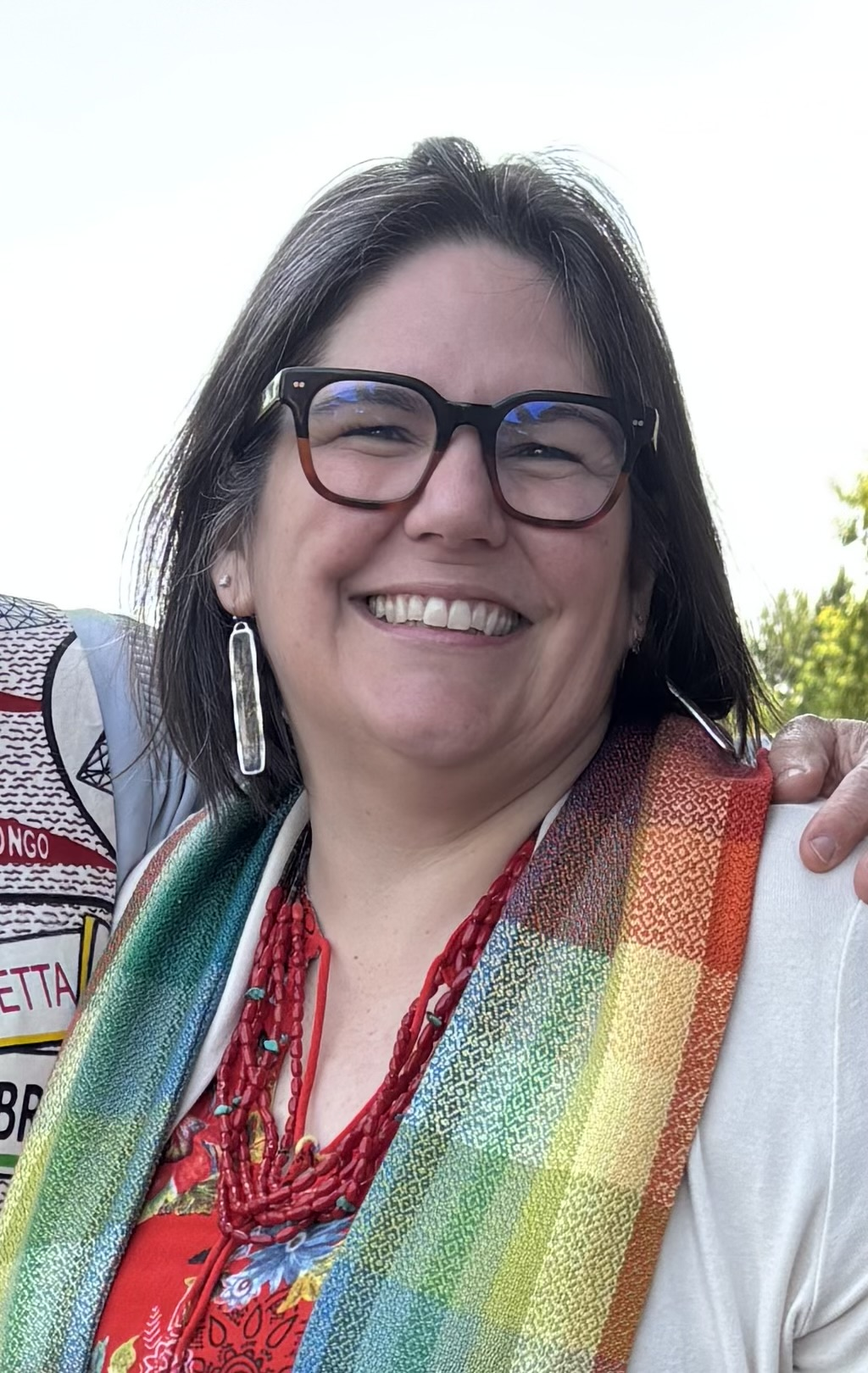
- Carmen Lansdowne in 2025
- Church: United Church of Canada
- Elected: July 23, 2022
- Term ended: August 11, 2025
- Predecessor: Richard Bott
- Successor: Kimberly Heath

Orders
- Ordination: 2007

Personal details
- Born: 1975 (age 50–51) Alert Bay, British Columbia, Canada

Carmen Lansdowne (born 1975) is an academic and minister of the United Church of Canada who was the 44th Moderator of that church. Lansdowne was the first Indigenous woman to lead a religious denomination in Canada.

== Early life and education ==
Lansdowne was born in Alert Bay on the West Coast of Canada as a member of the Heiltsuk First Nation. She earned an M.Div from Vancouver School of Theology (VST) in 2007, and was subsequently ordained as a minister of the United Church of Canada. She then earned a ThM from VST in 2011, and a PhD from Graduate Theological Union in Berkeley, California in 2016.

== Ministry ==
In 2017, Lansdowne became the executive director of First United Church Community Ministry Society in Vancouver. She is a Christ Institute Fellow with the Westar Institute.

== Moderator ==
Lansdowne was the only nomination to be 44th moderator, and was elected at the 44th General Council of the church in July 2022, the processes of the United Church having no option for acclamation. She was the first Indigenous woman chosen to be moderator, and only the second Indigenous person, the first being Stan McKay in 1992. Her election, Lansdowne said, spoke to "the time in which we live, as Canadians become more educated and aware of the calls to action from the Truth and Reconciliation Commission, as well as the several hundred recommendations from the final report of the Royal Commission on Aboriginal People and the calls to justice from the National Inquiry on Murdered and Missing Indigenous Women and Girls. These are all catalysts, alongside the confirmation of unmarked graves at residential schools, for the need for deeper dialogue and learning about a relationship between Indigenous and non-Indigenous Canadians."

At the start of her term, Lansdowne said she planned "To build new connections and rebuild old ones. To work towards social change that sees a world cared for, and human dignity honoured. To walk together every day in repentance and reconciliation. To march and fight and change unjust systems together. To pray together. To sing together. To discern together."

== Academic career ==
Following the end of her term as moderator, Lansdowne became an assistant professor of United Church of Canada Studies at Emmanuel College, Toronto.

Religious titles
Preceded by Richard Bott	Moderator of the United Church of Canada; 2022–2025	Succeeded by Kimberly Heath
