= Gary Paterson =

The Very Reverend Gary Paterson
- 41st Moderator of the United Church of Canada
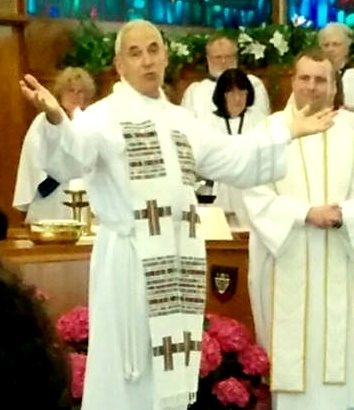
- Paterson on Easter Sunday, April 20, 2014
- Church: United Church of Canada
- In office: August 18, 2012 - August 13, 2015
- Predecessor: Mardi Tindal
- Successor: Jordan Cantwell

Orders
- Ordination: 1977

Personal details
- Born: 1949 (age 76–77) Whitehorse, Yukon, Canada
- Spouse: Tim Stevenson
- Children: 3
- Education: University of British Columbia; Queen's University; Andover Newton Theological School; Vancouver School of Theology

Gary J. Paterson (born 1949) was the Moderator of the United Church of Canada from 2012 to 2015. He was the first openly gay person to take the post since the church was formed in 1925 and the first in the world to lead a major Christian denomination.

== Early life and education ==
Paterson was born in Whitehorse, Yukon in 1949, and as an "army brat", lived in Toronto, Ontario and Germany before his family settled in Vancouver, British Columbia.

He earned two degrees in English literature and became a sessional lecturer at University of British Columbia.

== Ministry ==
Paterson studied theology in Boston and the Vancouver School of Theology before being ordained by the United Church of Canada in 1977. He served as minister at several rural and urban churches, became a staff member of the British Columbia Conference of the United Church, then served as minister at three churches in Vancouver: Ryerson United Church, First United Church, and his current church, St. Andrew's-Wesley United Church, where he is Lead Minister.

== Moderator ==
Paterson was nominated to be Moderator in 2012, and at the 41st General Council of the church, he was elected to the position on August 16, 2012, after six ballots, and was installed as Moderator two days later.

In an interview following his election, Paterson acknowledged that the United Church faced many challenges, but while in office, he hoped to bring inspiration and hope during times of change.

== Honours and personal life ==
Paterson received an honorary doctorate from the Vancouver School of Theology in 2012.

Paterson lives in Vancouver with his spouse, Tim Stevenson, a Vancouver city councillor who, in 1992, was the first openly gay person to be ordained by the United Church. Paterson has three children from a previous marriage.

Religious titles
Preceded by Mardi Tindal	Moderator of the United Church of Canada; 2012-2015	Succeeded by Jordan Cantwell
