= Gilles Rocheleau =

Canadian politician (1935–1998)

Member of Parliament for Hull—Aylmer
- In office 1988–1993
- Preceded by: Gaston Isabelle
- Succeeded by: Marcel Massé

Member of the National Assembly of Quebec for Hull
- In office 1981–1988
- Preceded by: Jocelyne Ouellette
- Succeeded by: Robert LeSage

Personal details
- Born: 28 August 1935 Hull, Quebec, Canada
- Died: 27 June 1998 (aged 62) Hull, Quebec, Canada
- Party: Quebec Liberal Party; Liberal Party of Canada → Bloc Québécois
- Education: University of Ottawa
- Occupation: Businessman

Gilles Rocheleau (French pronunciation: [ʒil ʁɔʃlo]) 28 August 1935 – 27 June 1998) was a Canadian businessman and politician who served in the National Assembly of Quebec from 1981 to 1988 and House of Commons of Canada from 1988 to 1993. He co-founded the Bloc Québécois with Lucien Bouchard in 1990.

== Biography ==
Rocheleau was born in Hull, Quebec, he was a businessman by career. His post-secondary education was at the University of Ottawa. He became a city councillor in 1967, then mayor from 1974 to 1981. He was elected as a member of the National Assembly of Quebec in 1981 in Hull as a member of the Liberal Party of Quebec. He was again elected to the Assembly in 1985 and became a cabinet minister in Premier Robert Bourassa's administration.

He left provincial politics to campaign in the 1988 federal election in the Hull—Aylmer electoral district for the national Liberal party. He served in the 34th Canadian Parliament until he left the party on 2 July 1990 following the implosion of the Meech Lake Accord. After several months as an independent, he became a charter member of the Bloc Québécois party on 20 December 1990.

However, Rocheleau's embrace of Quebec sovereigntism did not play well in his strongly federalist riding, and he was roundly defeated by Liberal candidate Marcel Massé in the 1993 federal election, losing almost half of his vote from 1988.

He was married twice: to Denise Gagné in 1956 and then later to Hélène Roy.

Rocheleau died in Hull at the age of 62.

== Electoral record (partial) ==
1993 Canadian federal election
Party	Candidate	Votes	%	±%
Liberal	Marcel Massé	27,988	53.26	+3.43
Bloc Québécois	Gilles Rocheleau	14,293	27.20	
Independent	Tony Cannavino	4,583	8.72	
Progressive Conservative	Pierre Chénier	3,244	6.17	-25.70
New Democratic	Francine Bourque	1,346	2.56	-12.83
Green	George Halpern	468	0.89	
Natural Law	Robert Mayer	401	0.76	
Marxist–Leninist	Françoise Roy	162	0.31	
Abolitionist	Linda Dubois	63	0.12	
Total valid votes		52,548	100.00	

1988 Canadian federal election
Party	Candidate	Votes	%	±%
Liberal	Gilles Rocheleau	23,218	49.83	+9.26
Progressive Conservative	Nicole Moreault	14,849	31.87	-5.15
New Democratic	Danielle Lapointe-Vienneau	7,170	15.39	-4.23
Rhinoceros	Denis Le Citron Patenaude	661	1.42	
Independent	Glen Kealey	559	1.20	
Independent	Serge Lafortune	134	0.29	
Total valid votes		46,591	100.00	

1981 Quebec general election: Hull
Party	Candidate	Votes	%	±%
Liberal	Gilles Rocheleau	15,572	49.76	
Parti Québécois	Jocelyne Ouellette	15,116	48.30	
Union Nationale	Joe McGovern	263	0.84	–
Workers	Gilles Bourque	153	0.49	
Independent	Gilles Bégin	96	0.31	
Communist	Marc Bonhomme	59	0.19	
Marxist–Leninist	Pierre Soublière	35	0.11	
Total valid votes		31,294	100.00	
Rejected and declined votes		530		
Turnout		31,824	80.19	
Electors on the lists		39,686		
