= Richard Bott =

Former moderator of the United Church of Canada

The Very Reverend Richard Bott
- 43rd Moderator of the United Church of Canada
- Church: United Church of Canada
- Elected: July 26, 2018
- Term ended: July 23, 2022
- Predecessor: Jordan Cantwell
- Successor: Carmen Lansdowne

Orders
- Ordination: 1994

Personal details
- Born: 1968 (age 57–58) Marathon, Ontario, Canada

Richard Bott (born 1968) is a minister of the United Church of Canada who served as the 43rd Moderator of that church from 2018 to 2022.

== Early life and education ==
Bott was born in Marathon, Ontario and grew up there. Following his graduation from high school, he attended University of Ottawa, where he earned his Bachelor of Social Sciences degree in 1990. He then earned his Master of Divinity (M.Div.) degree from Queen's University in 1994.

== Ministry ==
Following his graduation, Bott was ordained as a minister of the United Church. Over the next 24 years he served at five churches in Ontario and British Columbia. During that time, he earned a Diploma in Stewardship Studies from Queen's Theological College (1996), a Certificate in Dispute Resolution from Laurentian University (1998) and a Doctor of Ministry from Ashland Theological Seminary (2003).

In 2000, Bott also became a liturgical writer, publishing articles, prayers and liturgy in a variety of Christian publications.

== Moderator ==
Bott was nominated to be moderator in 2018, and at the 43rd General Council of the church in Oshawa, Ontario, he was elected after five ballots. Following his election, Bott said, "I am excited about the possibilities that are in front of the church and hopeful that we are going to live into them together."

During his installation service, Bott spoke of the feeding of the multitude, when a small child offered Jesus five small loaves and two small fish in order to feed a large crowd: "This child offered what they had, knowing that they might stay hungry. The child is us at our best, and the child is the world at its best; when we are ready to offer without having any idea what the end result might be — trusting that what God does with the gift, and with us, will be enough to satisfy the hunger, the hunger of all the world, and more."

As all moderators since 1994, Bott was due to serve for three years until his successor was chosen at the 44th General Council of the United Church in August 2021. However, due to the COVID-19 pandemic, the General Council was postponed a year, and Bott's term was subsequently extended until then.

== Return to pastoral ministry ==
After stepping down as Moderator in 2022, Bott returned to pastoral ministry, becoming the minister of Grace United Church in Burlington, Ontario.

Religious titles
Preceded by Jordan Cantwell	Moderator of the United Church of Canada; 2018–2022	Succeeded by Carmen Lansdowne
