= Kimberly Heath =

Moderator of the United Church of Canada since 2025

The Right Reverend Dr. Kimberly Heath
- 45th Moderator of the United Church of Canada
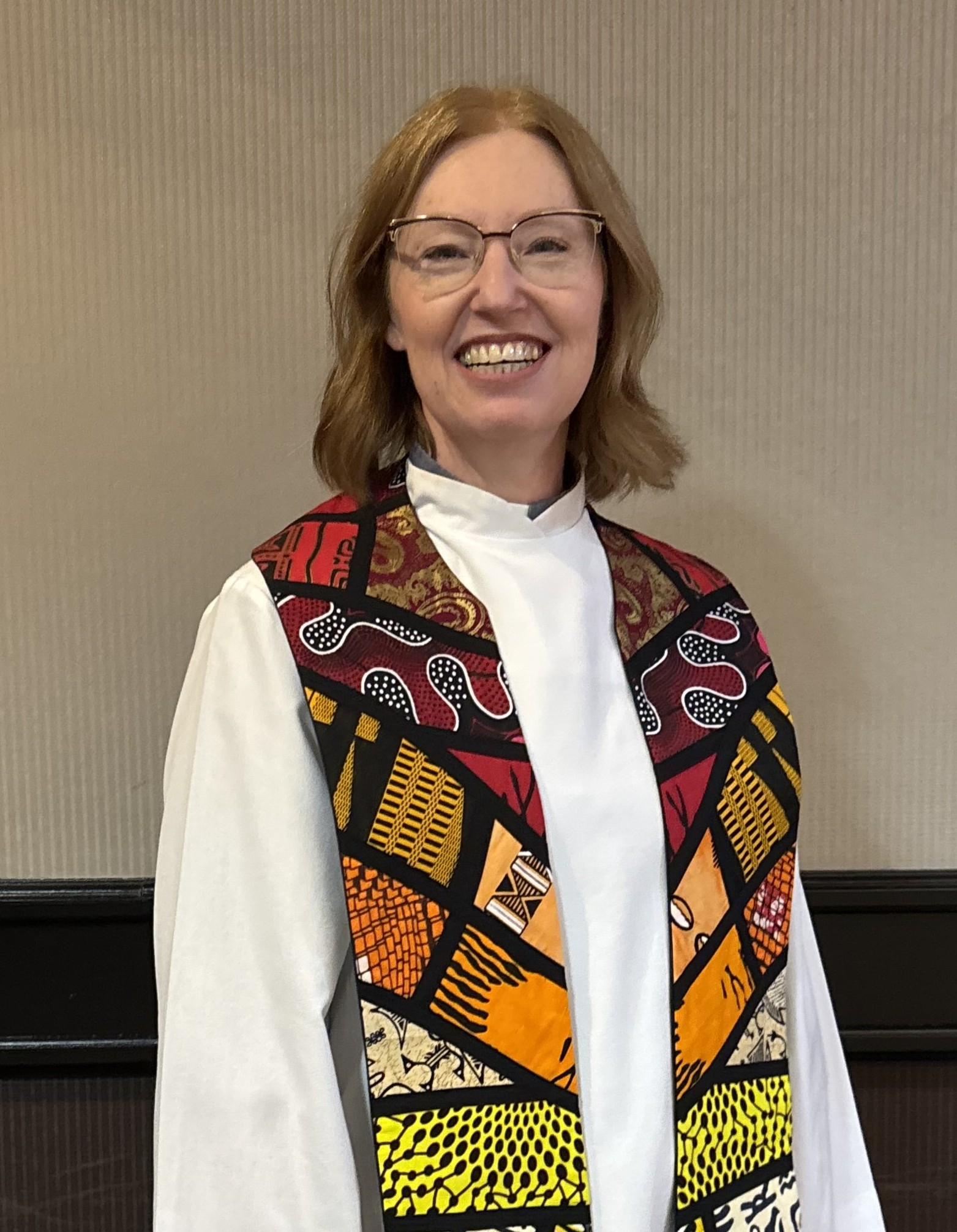
- Rev. Dr. Kimberly Heath in 2026
- Church: United Church of Canada
- Elected: August 9, 2025
- Predecessor: Carmen Lansdowne

Orders
- Ordination: 1999

Personal details
- Born: 1972 or 1973 (53–54) Lusaka, Zambia
- Children: 4

Kimberly Heath is a Zambia-born Canadian minister who is the 45th Moderator of the United Church of Canada, serving since 2025.

== Early life and education ==
Kimberly Heath was born in Lusaka, Zambia, where her Canadian parents, Rev. Alan & Wendy Bennett, were serving as teachers through the United Church of Canada. After her parents moved back to Canada, Heath spent her early years in small towns across Canada as her father moved from church to church. She earned a bachelor's degree from McGill University in Montreal, and a Master of Divinity at Emmanuel College, Toronto.

== Ministry ==
Heath was ordained a minister of the United Church of Canada in 1999, and her first post was a two-point charge in Claresholm and Stavely, Alberta. After eight years in Western Canada, Heath returned to Ontario in 2007 to be the minister of Wall St. United Church in Brockville, a post she filled until her election as Moderator.

In 2023, Heath completed a three-year Doctorate in Ministry from McCormick Theological Seminary. Her thesis "Aware, Repair, Renew: Preaching Into Transformation in a Mainline Church", reframed the 12 steps of Alcoholics Anonymous into three movements — awareness, reparation and renewal — that would enable everyone to experience transformation.

== Moderator ==
In 2025, Heath was nominated for the role of Moderator. Writing about the church before the election, Heath noted, "We are smaller than we used to be, and we are going to be smaller still. Rather than fear this, it’s time to embrace being small. Why? It’s our reality, and God seems to like small. You only need a little bit of yeast to make bread rise. You only need a little bit of salt to flavour a meal or seriously irritate an eye ... God makes the small vibrant, vital and courageous ... More than anything as a church we are called: called by God to join the movement, join the resistance, join the life."

On 9 August 2025, at the 45th General Council of the United Church in Calgary, Heath, one of five nominees, was elected to the post of Moderator on the third ballot. She was installed as Moderator two days later. At her installation service, Heath said, "Your hopes for me, your hopes for this church, they lie in you. The spirit has given you these gifts to shine into the church ... Faithfulness is often not very sexy or exciting. It's humble. It's committed. And I'm grateful for all of you who do so much to keep the lamp of God burning. To keep that oil in the lamp."

== Personal life ==
Heath is married to a lawyer and has four children.

Religious titles
Preceded by Carmen Lansdowne	Moderator of the United Church of Canada; 2025–present	Incumbent
