= Jocelyne Ouellette =

Canadian politician

MNA for Hull
- In office 1976–1981
- Preceded by: Oswald Parent
- Succeeded by: Gilles Rocheleau

Personal details
- Born: April 6, 1944 Hull, Quebec
- Died: August 20, 2015 (aged 71)
- Party: Parti Québécois

Jocelyne Villeneuve Ouellette (April 6, 1944 – August 20, 2015) was a Canadian politician, who represented the electoral district of Hull in the National Assembly of Quebec from 1976 to 1981. She served as the Minister of Public Works and Supply in the government of René Lévesque.

She was a member of the Parti Québécois.

Political offices
Preceded by Lucien Lessard	Minister of Public Works and Supply of Quebec; 1976–1981	Succeeded by Alain Marcoux
