= Oswald Parent =

Canadian politician (1925–2011)

MNA for Hull
- In office 1956–1976
- Preceded by: Alexandre Taché
- Succeeded by: Jocelyne Ouellette

Personal details
- Born: September 30, 1925 Hull, Quebec
- Died: July 4, 2011 (aged 85)
- Party: Quebec Liberal Party

Oswald Parent (September 30, 1925, in Hull, Quebec – July 4, 2011) was a Quebec politician and chartered accountant. He was the Member of the National Assembly of Quebec from 1956 to 1976 (Legislative Assembly of Quebec from 1956 to 1968) for the riding of Hull. A member of the legislature for 20 years, Parent was the longest-serving MLA/MNA for the Hull riding.

Parent graduated from Queen's University, where he obtained a degree in commerce. He later worked as a clerk at the Hull branch of the provincial bank, an auditor and a chartered accountant from 1946 to 1965. He also worked for the Youth Chamber of Commerce of Hull and of Canada, the Western Quebec Chamber of Commerce, became a member of the Knights of Columbus and the director of the Societe Saint-Jean-Baptiste.

Parent was first elected as a Quebec Liberal Party MLA, defeating the Union Nationale's Alexandre Taché in 1956 . He was re-elected for five other terms until 1976, when he was defeated by the Parti Québécois candidate, Jocelyne Ouellette. He served as the Minister for intergovernmental affairs and Finances Minister from 1971 to 1975 as well as the Minister of Public Works from 1972 to 1976.

After his defeat, Parent returned to practicing his profession until his retirement in 1995.
