= Marion Best =

Moderator of the United Church of Canada from 1994 to 1997

Marion Best (born 1932) was the 35th Moderator of the United Church of Canada from 1994 to 1997. Best succeeded Stan McKay as the spiritual leader and chief officer of the church.

Best is a well-known lay leader in the United Church of Canada and in 1998 began serving as a vice-Moderator for the World Council of Churches. Best has served as President of British Columbia Conference and on the United Church's General Council Executive-the body that deals with the specific assignments from the broad vision that the General Council endorses every three years.

Best is also known for being the first Moderator of the United Church to serve a three-year term as the General Council deemed its work to be more fruitful that way.

Religious titles
Preceded by Stan McKay	Moderator of the United Church of Canada; 1994–1997	Succeeded by Bill Phipps
