= Jordan Cantwell =

Moderator of the United Church of Canada

The Very Reverend Jordan Cantwell
- 42nd Moderator of the United Church of Canada
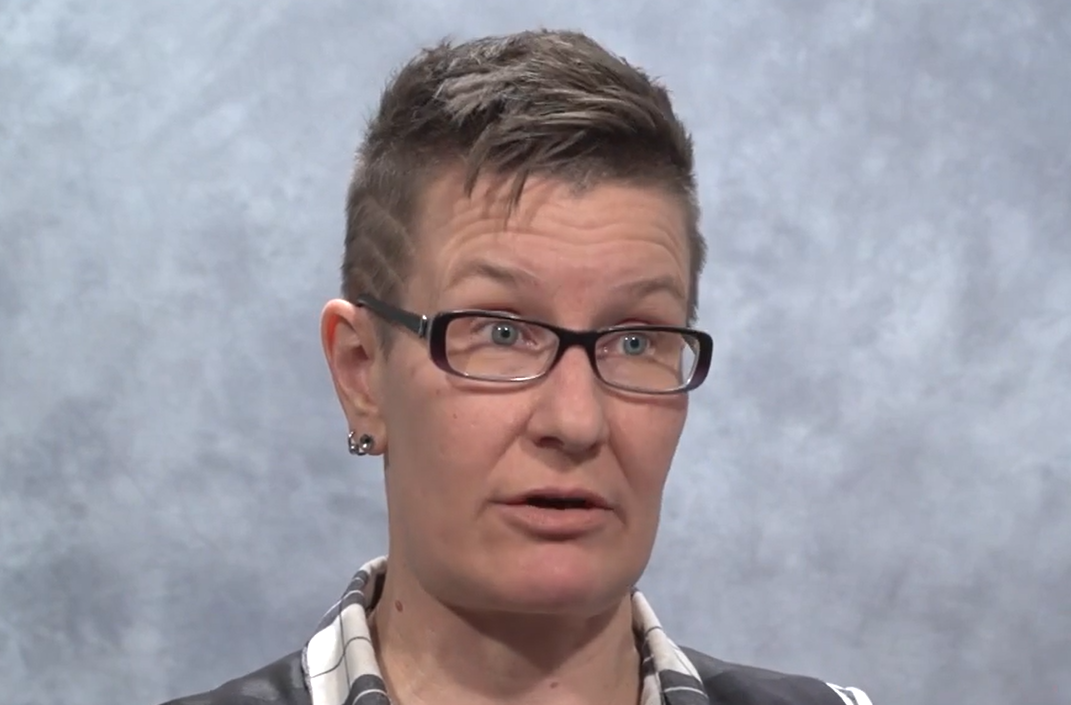
- Jordan Cantwell in 2017
- Church: United Church of Canada
- Elected: August 13, 2015
- Term ended: July 26, 2018
- Predecessor: Gary Paterson
- Successor: Richard Bott

Orders
- Ordination: 2010

Personal details
- Born: 1967 (age 58–59) New York
- Spouse: Laura Fouhse
- Education: St. Andrew's College

Jordan Cantwell (born 1967) was the Moderator of the United Church of Canada from 2015 to 2018. She was ordained as a minister of the United Church in 2010, and was elected to the position of Moderator at the 42nd General Council of the church in Corner Brook, Newfoundland and Labrador, in 2015.

== Life ==
Cantwell was born in New York in 1967; when she was in grade two, the family moved to the Canadian Prairies. Her mother being Methodist and her father Roman Catholic, she was raised in the Anglican church, but left it when she was in her twenties. Cantwell became involved in social justice issues such as the anti-apartheid movement of the late 1980s, and in 1993, the United Church of Canada sent her to South Africa as an international observer through the World Council of Churches.

Cantwell joined the United Church in the 1990s, and began to work for the Centre for Christian Studies in Winnipeg, Manitoba, where she met her future spouse, Laura Fouhse, a diaconal minister of the United Church. She also worked as a staff associate – a part-time lay minister – at Augustine United Church in Winnipeg. She was one of the co-plaintiffs in Vogel v Canada, the court case which ultimately legalized same-sex marriage in Manitoba.

In 2006, at the age of 39, Cantwell made the decision to become an ordained minister of the United Church; however, she would need to first earn a Master of Divinity degree. She and her family subsequently moved to Saskatoon, Saskatchewan so that she could attend St. Andrew's College. Upon graduation in 2010, she was ordained and was settled as a "three-quarters time" minister of Delisle-Vanscoy United Church in Delisle, Saskatchewan. (The small rural congregation could only afford the equivalent of three-quarters of a full-time position.)

She also took on various roles within the national church. Over the years, several people suggested that she consider running for the role of Moderator. After some thought, Cantwell agreed to be nominated, and at the 42nd General Council of the church in 2015, she was one of twelve candidates. On August 13, 2015, on the fifth ballot, delegates chose her as the new Moderator. She was installed the next day, and remained in that post until the 43rd General Council in 2018.

In an interview following her election, Cantwell acknowledged that although the United Church was in a state of change due to falling membership, "We are fundamentally a people of hope. Our story is one of hope, and when we tap into that I think we are our best selves and we are what we are called to be and we have something to offer the world." She also acknowledged that this was a difficult time for many church members. "People will be in all kinds of different places on the journey. Some will be in a time of lament. Some will be in a time of panic. Some will be in celebration and excitement. My intention would be to journey with folks where they are and to remind us that the stories of our faith teach us that God is with us on our journey, wherever we are."

At her installation service, she spoke of the feeding of the multitude, where Jesus fed several thousand people with only a few fish and loaves of bread: "Jesus did something far more radical and amazing than stretching five loaves to feed five thousand... He reminded them that they were a people constituted by an alternative vision of how the world might be, a whole different set of principles and values and therefore a whole different set of possibilities than the ones offered by the dominant culture."

== Personal ==
Cantwell is the second openly gay person to be elected to the post, and the second to lead a major Christian denomination, the first in both cases being her predecessor, Gary Paterson.

She and her spouse, Laura Fouhse, have a daughter, Hope, and reside in Saskatoon.

Religious titles
Preceded by Gary Paterson	Moderator of the United Church of Canada; 2015-2018	Succeeded by Richard Bott
