= Sang Chul Lee =

Korean Canadian pastor (1924–2017)

The Very Reverend Sang Chul Lee

11th Chancellor of Victoria University, Toronto
- In office 1992–1998
- President: Eva Kushner; Roseann Runte
- Preceded by: Northrop Frye
- Succeeded by: Kenneth D. Taylor

32nd Moderator of the United Church of Canada
- In office 1988–1990
- Preceded by: Anne M. Squire
- Succeeded by: Walter H. Farquharson

Personal details
- Born: February 29, 1924 Siberia
- Died: January 28, 2017 (aged 92) Newmarket, Ontario, Canada
- Children: 3
- Website: The United Church of Canada

Religious life
- Ordination: 1954

- Sang Chul Lee
- Hangul: 이상철
- RR: I Sangcheol
- MR: I Sangch'ŏl

Sang Chul Lee (February 29, 1924 – January 28, 2017) was the 32nd Moderator of the United Church of Canada and the first person of Asian descent to hold the position. He was elected by the 32nd General Council of the United Church of Canada at their meeting in Victoria, British Columbia. He was married and had three daughters.

== Early life ==
Lee was born in 1924 to Korean immigrant parents in Siberia during the reign of Joseph Stalin. At the age of seven, his family moved to Japanese-occupied Manchuria, where he attended a mission high school operated by Canadian missionaries, and against the wishes of his parents - who were devout Shamans - he converted to Christianity. After World War II, Lee moved to South Korea. Lee saw Christianity as a way to cope with the brutality he had experienced in both Manchuria and Korea and was particularly interested in the Exodus story of Moses and the Israelites. He received theological education in South Korea, Switzerland and Canada.

The United Church of Canada had inherited overseas missions in Asia from their founding denominations, who established the Korean mission in 1893. The United Church maintained this mission after church union in 1925 and it blossomed into a vital and growing community of faith. This was how Lee became exposed to Christianity and he was ordained as a minister of the United Church of Canada in 1954, remaining in South Korea to serve their overseas mission there.

== Life in Canada ==
Lee accepted a call to a Japanese congregation in Vancouver, British Columbia and immigrated to Canada with his family in 1965. This was a largely immigrant congregation and Lee's ministry made a point of creating a community of faith for new Asian immigrants to Canada. It was during this time that Canadian immigration policies were changing and it was becoming easier for Asians to both immigrate to and remain in Canada as landed immigrants. It was for this reason that Lee himself settled in Canada and was able to strengthen the United Church's ministry to new immigrants. After serving in Vancouver for four years, in 1969, Lee moved to Toronto and began with his own Korean congregation. There, he served for twenty years.

As Moderator, Lee spoke on issues such as the ordination of homosexual persons, racial equality, indigenous and other human rights issues. He also continued to work to build bridges between the church and the Korean and other immigrant communities in Canada. The marriage of his daughter, which Lee himself performed, was the first inter-racial marriage performed in the United Church of Canada and opened the door to the acceptance of inter-racial marriages in the Canadian Christian community. In 1989, Lee was named Rainbow Chief of the All Native Circle Conference.

He said the United Church had a special role in the world. “The religious community is the one constantly supplying dreams and visions and hopes, not despair and destruction,” he once said. “Sometimes our dreams are so small. God’s dream is so much larger than ours.”

After his term as Moderator was finished, Lee went on to become the chancellor of Victoria University at the University of Toronto, holding that position from 1992 until 1998.

== Death and legacy ==
Lee died at his home in Newmarket, Ontario on January 28, 2017, at the age of 92.

Upon news of his death, the current Moderator at the time, Right Reverend Jordan Cantwell said, "He provided leadership for the church in a time of great division and nastiness in the church. I remember someone telling me that when he was asked how he felt about leading the church through such a fraught time, he responded that he had lived through occupations, revolutions, and brushes with death, so he thought he could handle some church controversy.”

Religious titles
Preceded by Anne M. Squire	Moderator of the United Church of Canada; 1988–1990	Succeeded by Walter H. Farquharson
