= Vancouver School of Theology =

Graduate school affiliated with the University of British Columbia

Coordinates: 49°16′15.79″N 123°15′2.44″W

- Established: 1971; 55 years ago
- Affiliations: ATS
- President: Richard R. Topping
- Dean: Mari Joerstad
- Students: approx. 200
- Location: 6015 Walter Gage Road, Vancouver, BC, V6T 1Z1, Canada
- Campus: University of British Columbia
- Website: vst.edu

The Vancouver School of Theology is a Christian ecumenical divinity school located on the campus of and affiliated with the University of British Columbia.

== History ==
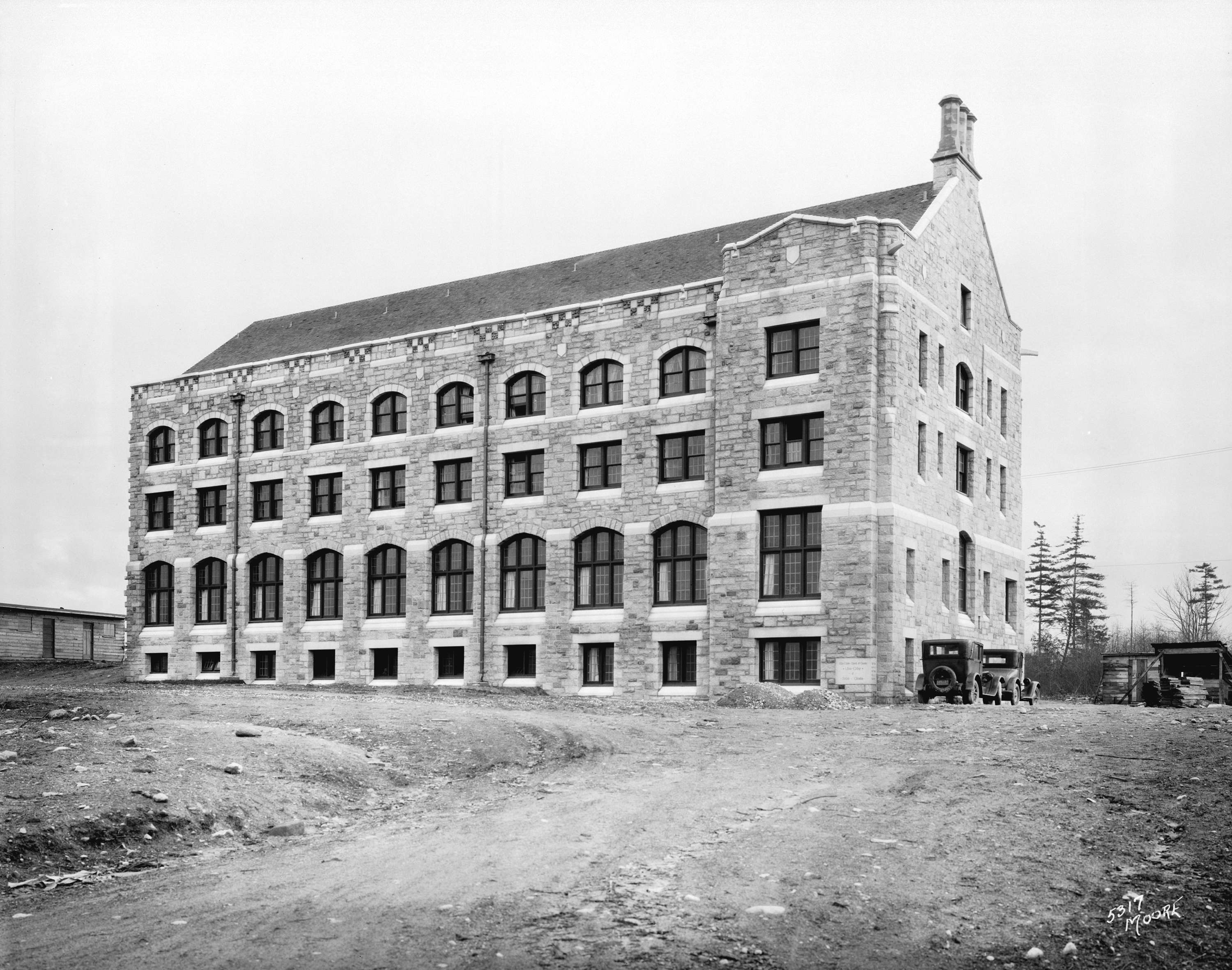
Union College of British Columbia building in 1928

Vancouver School of Theology was established in 1971, as an amalgamation of the Anglican Theological College (ATC) and Union College of British Columbia (UCBC), affiliated with the United Church of Canada. The two colleges had existed side by side for a number of years prior to the amalgamation.

ATC was formed in 1920 as a merger of two Anglican seminaries. The evangelical Latimer Hall was founded in 1910, while the more liberal and high church St Mark's Hall followed two years later at a nearby location. The merged ATC moved into the Chancellor Building at UBC in 1927.

Westminster Hall (formerly Presbyterian) was the first formal theological college in Vancouver, and classes started in 1908, first at McGill University Vancouver (1907–1915) Campus, then in their own building at 1600 Barclay Street from the fall of 1908 until 1927, when the first part of UCBC (west wing of the Iona Building at UBC) was ready for use. Ryerson College formerly Methodist, and named after educator Egerton Ryerson, was meeting in Westminster Hall since classes began in 1923. It was an extension of the Columbian College started in New Westminster in 1892. There is little available data on the Congregational College of British Columbia, as according to the United Church of Canada's First General Council's Minutes, in 1925, the college was incorporated, but never held any classes.

The tower section of the Iona Building was completed during the 1930s.

From initial discussions with Anglican and the then separate Methodist and Presbyterian groups in 1922, there has been open discussion on joint studies, and was a reason Ryerson Hall never constructed a separate building. Throughout the 1960s, the two colleges cooperated in offering courses and access to materials, and discussions started regarding the creation of a new theological school to serve the area. The current-day Vancouver School of Theology was formed in 1971. The creation of VST occurred in a climate in which full communion between the Anglican Church of Canada and United Church was under serious consideration, although this union did not take place.

Saint Andrew's Hall, a residence established by the Presbyterian Church in Canada during the 1950s, officially became affiliated with the VST. The school has also been recognized by the Presbyterian Church (USA) and the United Methodist Church, both of the United States, as a training institution for their clergy.

The Institute for stained glass in Canada has documented the stained glass at Vancouver School of Theology.

== Academics ==
=== Degrees awarded ===
Vancouver School of Theology currently offers the following degrees and certifications:

- Certificate in Theological Studies (also offered via continuing education)
- Diploma in Theological Studies
- Diploma in Denominational Studies
- Graduate Diploma in Theological Studies
- Master of Divinity
- Master of Divinity by extension through the Native Ministry Program
- Master of Arts in Theological Studies
- Master of Arts in Indigenous and Inter-Religious Studies
- Master of Theology in Indigenous and Inter-Religious Studies
- Master of Theology
- Master of Public and Pastoral Leadership

=== Academic awards and scholarships ===
Vancouver Theological Seminary awards annual prizes for Excellence in Writing and Excellence in Preaching named in honor of American theologian and author, Frederick Buechner. The Seminary also award the Angus MacMillan prize for proficiency in preaching, and the Lockhart Award for homiletics. Additionally, Vancouver Theological Seminary recognises missiological promise with the Henrietta DeWolfe Prize, and the John C. Sibley Prize. Excellence in the study of Church History is awarded with various prizes, including the Runnalls Award, the Dr. Kosaburo Shimizu Prize, the George R. Gordon Prize, and the Ellis Weston Memorial Award. Students that achieve excellence in the area of Biblical studies are recognised with the Lloyd Gaston Memorial Fund, the Rev. Dr. Robert Robinson Morrison Prize, and the Professor S. Vernon Fawcett Prize in Hebrew Bible.

Students at the Vancouver Theological Seminary are also eligible to apply for a range of scholarships, awarded both by the School and external organisations. Awarding organisations include the Anglican Foundation of Canada, the B.C. Paraplegic Foundation, the Beatty Ryckman Trust, the Canadian Armed Forces, the Canadian Hard of Hearing Association, the Ecole Biblique, the Knights Templar, the Leonard Foundation, the P.E.O. Sisterhood, the Prayer Book Society of Canada, the Presbyterian Church in Canada, the Royal Canadian Legion, the United Church of Canada, the Working Parent College Scholarship Program, the World Alliance of Reformed Churches, and the Canadian Federation of University Women.

== Move from Iona Drive ==
On January 8, 2014, the Vancouver Sun reported that University of British Columbia had purchased the 85-year-old Vancouver School of Theology building on Iona Drive for $28 million and will convert it to the new home of UBC's Vancouver School of Economics (VSE) since the building was too large and costly for VST's 115 full- and part-time students to maintain. The Christian graduate school will move—in the summer of 2014—to a smaller building "on the north side of the UBC campus, called Somerville House. The school will retain its A-frame Chapel of Epiphany". While the 1927 9,290-square-metre (100,000 sq ft) Iona building is the longtime home of the Vancouver School of Theology, it needs only about a "quarter of the space" and it is finding it difficult to keep up with operating costs. VST will use a portion of the sale proceeds to relocate their operations to more suitable space in the UBC theological neighbourhood and place the balance of the funds in an endowment to support its educational mission and operations. Vancouver School of Economics later moved into the Iona building in January 2016.

== Gallery ==
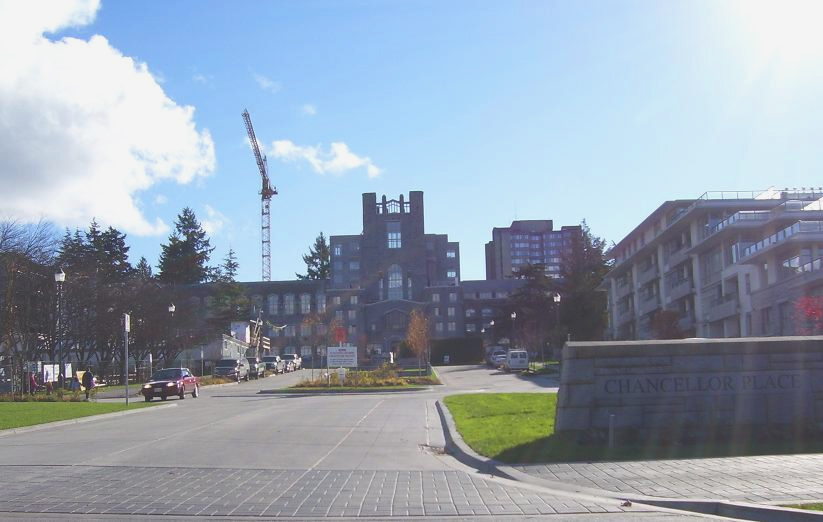
Chancellor Place and the Iona Building, previously home to the Vancouver School of Theology

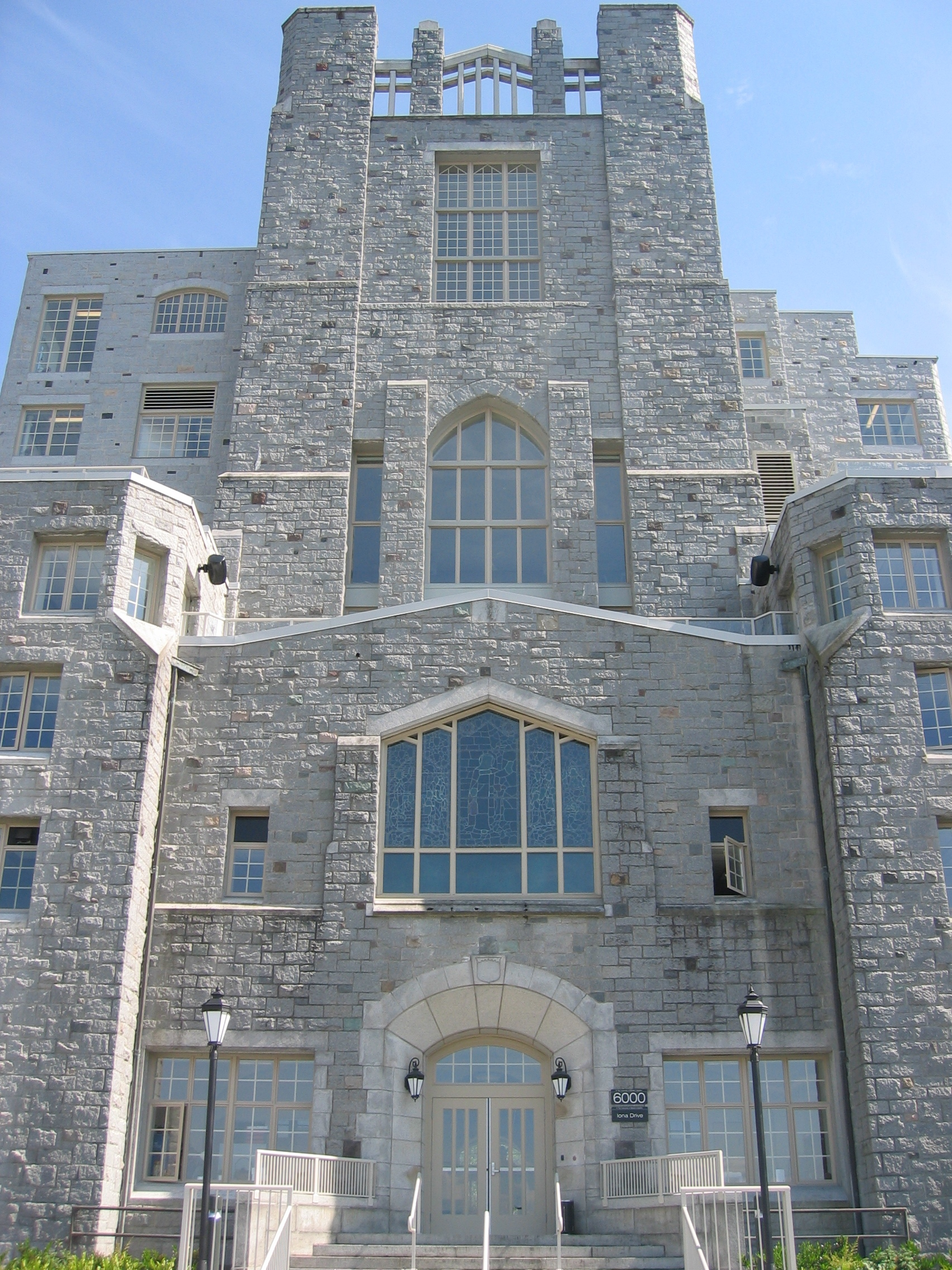
The Iona Building, previously home to VST

== History ==
- William S. Taylor 'Step by Step by Step: An Anecdotal History of the Growth of Union College, 1948-1971 Vancouver School of Theology and University Hill United Church' (Vancouver: 1993)
- Ralph C. Pybus, 'The Story of Union College' (Vancouver: Board of Governors, Union College of British Columbia, 1971 Pamphlet)

== See also ==
- University of British Columbia
- University Endowment Lands
- List of evangelical seminaries and theological colleges
