= Marcel Massé =

Canadian politician (born 1940)

The Honourable Marcel Massé PC OC KC

President of the Treasury Board
- In office January 25, 1996 – August 2, 1999
- Prime Minister: Jean Chrétien
- Preceded by: Art Eggleton
- Succeeded by: Lucienne Robillard

President of the Queen's Privy Council for Canada
- In office November 4, 1993 – January 24, 1996
- Prime Minister: Jean Chrétien
- Preceded by: Pierre Blais
- Succeeded by: Stéphane Dion

Minister of Intergovernmental Affairs
- In office November 4, 1993 – January 24, 1996
- Prime Minister: Jean Chrétien
- Preceded by: position created
- Succeeded by: Stéphane Dion

Member of Parliament for Hull—Aylmer
- In office October 25, 1993 – September 10, 1999
- Preceded by: Gilles Rocheleau
- Succeeded by: Marcel Proulx

Personal details
- Born: June 23, 1940 (age 86) Montreal, Quebec, Canada
- Party: Liberal
- Education: McGill University; Pembroke College, Oxford

Marcel Massé PC OC KC (French pronunciation: [maʁsɛl mase]; born June 23, 1940) is a Canadian former politician and retired civil servant who was the Liberal member of Parliament (MP) for Hull—Aylmer from 1993 to 1999 and held a number of ministerial offices in the Chrétien Ministry.

== Biography ==
Massé was born in Montreal, Quebec in 1940 and graduated from McGill University and Pembroke College, Oxford (as a Rhodes Scholar in 1963). He served as Clerk of the Privy Council in 1979 during the government of Prime Minister Joe Clark. In his distinguished public service career, he also served as President of the Canadian International Development Agency, on two occasions; was undersecretary for external affairs; and represented Canada as its executive director at the International Monetary Fund, World Bank and Inter-American Development Bank.

Massé's career in elected politics began when he ran as a candidate for Jean Chrétien's Liberal Party in the 1993 federal election. He was elected to the House of Commons of Canada as Member of Parliament for Hull—Aylmer. The incumbent, Gilles Rocheleau, had joined the sovereigntist Bloc Québécois in 1990 after the Meech Lake Accord failed. However, Rocheleau found himself running as a sovereigntist in a strongly federalist riding. Massé routed him by almost 13,700 votes, reverting the seat to its traditional status as a Liberal stronghold; before Rocheleau's brief stint in the Bloc, the riding had been in Liberal hands without interruption since its creation in 1914.

Following the election, he was appointed to the Canadian Cabinet as Minister of Intergovernmental Affairs, President of the Queen's Privy Council for Canada and Minister responsible for Public Service Renewal.

In 1996, a Cabinet shuffle moved him to the positions of President of the Treasury Board and Minister responsible for Infrastructure.

Massé was re-elected in the 1997 election, but retired from Cabinet in 1999 and resigned his seat in the House of Commons.

In 1985, he was made an Officer of the Order of Canada.

After the Liberal Party of Canada's leadership convention in December 2006 he was asked to join the transition team of newly elected leader Stéphane Dion. He served as Dion's Principal Secretary in the Office of the Leader of the Official Opposition for a period after Dion's selection as leader. He later left the post for health reasons.

== Electoral record ==
1997 Canadian federal election: Hull—Aylmer
Party	Candidate	Votes	%	Expenditures
Liberal	Marcel Massé	25,835	54.11	$47,001
Bloc Québécois	Ginette Tétreault	9,922	20.78	$31,255
Progressive Conservative	Stéphane Rondeau	8,461	17.72	$7,680
New Democratic	Peter Piening	1,317	2.76	$665
Reform	Camille Fortin	935	1.96	$1,308
Green	Gail Walker	586	1.23	$116
Christian Heritage	Ron Gray	275	0.58	$1,320
Natural Law	Robert Mayer	266	0.56	$0
Marxist–Leninist	Pierre Soublière	151	0.32	$0
Total valid votes/expense limit		47,748	100.00	$61,239
Total rejected ballots		1,114		
Turnout		48,862	70.44	
Electors on the lists		69,366		
Sources: Official Results, Elections Canada and Financial Returns, Elections Canada.

1993 Canadian federal election: Hull—Aylmer
Party	Candidate	Votes	%	±%	Expenditures
Liberal	Marcel Massé	27,988	53.26	–	$54,753
Bloc Québécois	Gilles Rocheleau	14,293	27.20		$38,257
Non-Affiliated	Tony Cannavino	4,583	8.72		$53,805
Progressive Conservative	Pierre Chénier	3,244	6.17		$49,356
New Democratic Party	Francine Bourque	1,346	2.56		$12,759
Green	George Halpern	468	0.89		$473
Natural Law	Robert Mayer	401	0.76		$225
Marxist-Leninist	Françoise Roy	162	0.31		$80
Abolitionist	Linda Dubois	63	0.12		$0
Total valid votes/expense limit		52,548	100.00	–	$56,938
Total rejected ballots		873			
Turnout		53,421	76.95		
Electors on the lists		69,419			
Source: Thirty-fifth General Election, 1993: Official Voting Results, Published by the Chief Electoral Officer of Canada. Financial figures taken from official contributions and expenses provided by Elections Canada.

Parliament of Canada
Preceded by Gilles Rocheleau	Member of Parliament from Hull—Aylmer; 1993–1999	Succeeded by Marcel Proulx
26th Canadian Ministry (1993–2003) – Cabinet of Jean Chrétien
Cabinet posts (3)
Predecessor	Office	Successor
Art Eggleton	President of the Treasury Board; 1996–1999	Lucienne Robillard
position created	Minister of Intergovernmental Affairs; 1993–1996	Stéphane Dion
Pierre Blais	President of the Queen's Privy Council for Canada; 1993–1996	Stéphane Dion
Special Cabinet Responsibilities
Predecessor	Title	Successor
Art Eggleton	Minister responsible for Infrastructure; 1996–1999	?
position created	Minister responsible for Public Service Renewal; 1993–1996	position abolished
