= Walter H. Farquharson =

The Very Reverend Walter H. Farquharson
- 33rd Moderator of the United Church of Canada
- Church: United Church of Canada
- Elected: 1990
- Term ended: 1992
- Predecessor: Sang Chul Lee
- Successor: Stan McKay

Orders
- Ordination: 1960

Personal details
- Born: 30 May 1936 (age 90) Near Rosetown, Saskatchewan
- Education: University of Saskatchewan

Walter Henry Farquharson (born 30 May 1936) is a Canadian clergyman who was Moderator of the United Church of Canada from 1990–1992. Born near Rosetown, Saskatchewan, he was educated at the University of Saskatchewan (BA, 1957) and St Andrew's College in the University of Saskatchewan (BD, 1961). After his ordination in 1960 he did a year of post-graduate study in Edinburgh, where he was also assistant minister at Morningside Parish Church. Returning to Canada he became the minister of the United Church in Saltcoats, Saskatchewan, where he remained until his retirement, and also, believing that ministry involves the whole of life, an English teacher in the local high school.

He is a noted hymn-writer; three of his hymns were published in The Hymn Book (Anglican and United Churches of Canada, 1971); one of his best-known, "Men go to God when they are sorely placed", a translation of Dietrich Bonhoeffer's Menschen gehen zu Gott in ihrer Not, also appeared in The Australian Hymn Book (Anglican, Methodist, Presbyterian, Congregational and Roman Catholic). Voices United, the United Church's successor hymnal to The Hymn Book (1971) contains thirteen Farquharson hymns. The Farquharson/Klusmeier collaboration "Walls That Divide" is sung at worship in churches throughout the world.

Religious titles
Preceded by Sang Chul Lee	Moderator of the United Church of Canada; 1990–1992	Succeeded by Stan McKay
