= Anne M. Squire =

31st Moderator of the United Church of Canada from 1986 to 1988

- 31st Moderator of the United Church of Canada
- Church: United Church of Canada
- Elected: 1986
- Predecessor: Robert F. Smith
- Successor: Sang Chul Lee

Personal details
- Born: October 17, 1920 Amherstburg, Ontario, Canada
- Died: April 24, 2017 (aged 96) Ottawa, Ontario, Canada
- Denomination: United Church of Canada
- Spouse: Bill Squire
- Children: Marni, Lauri, and Fran
- Education: Carleton University

Anne Marguerite Squire (née Park; October 17, 1920 – April 24, 2017), 31st Moderator of the United Church of Canada from 1986 to 1988, was the first female lay person elected to that post. Her time as Moderator was marked by controversy over the question of whether members of the LGBTQ community should be ordained.

== Early life ==
Anne Park was born in Amherstburg, Ontario to a Methodist mother and Anglican father. After graduating from high school in 1938, she became a public school teacher. She met Bill Squire at a Hallowe'en dance, and they were married in 1943. She left teaching in 1945 to raise a family, and became a Sunday School teacher.

== Moderator ==
After her children were grown up, Squire enrolled at Carleton University in Ottawa and received her B.A. in 1974, and an M.A. in Religion in 1975. She then taught at Carleton's Lay School of Theology from 1975 until 1982.

In 1982, she was appointed Secretary of the United Church Division of Ministry, Personnel and Education. It was during this period that Squire, as a member of Ottawa Presbytery's Education and Student's Committee, first studied the issue of gay ordination; the committee came to the decision that there "were no theological or policy reasons for refusing to ordain someone who was gay or lesbian." The committee recommended a church-wide study, which was implemented.

In 1986 she became the first laywoman elected to the post of United Church Moderator. (Robert McClure, 23rd Moderator 1968–1971, was the first layperson elected to the post.) During her time in office, Squire was the target of much vitriolic correspondence from church members who opposed the ongoing study on human sexuality and ministry. In 1987, Squire told Maclean's magazine, "“It is difficult to find a neutral person. It touches the emotions of people at a deep level [...] I think the church is being tested by fire. It could be burned to ashes — but it could be strengthened and tempered like steel.” As part of her final days as Moderator, Squire presided over the 32nd General Council of the United Church, where the report Gift, Dilemma, and Promise: A Report and Affirmations of Human Sexuality was received. The report stated that "all persons, regardless of sexual orientation, who profess their faith in Jesus Christ are welcome to be or become members of The United Church of Canada" and that "all members of the United Church are eligible to be considered for ordered ministry." After much debate, the report was accepted, opening the door to ordination of members of the LGBTQ community.

Of her time as Moderator, a role traditionally filled by an ordained minister, Squire wrote, "My theology of ministry is that all ministry is the ministry of Jesus Christ, and we are invited to participate in that. Lay people have as much to offer as those in the Order of Ministry. All that I have done is to help that concept of ministry be accepted by the church."

== Honours ==
- Doctor of Divinity, McGill University (1980)
- Doctor of Divinity, Queen's University (1985)
- Doctor of Laws, Carleton University (1988)
- Senate medal, Carleton University (1972)

Religious titles
Preceded by Robert F. Smith	Moderator of the United Church of Canada; 1986–1988	Succeeded by Sang Chul Lee
