= Robert Gordon Rogers =

Lieutenant Governor of British Columbia

The Honourable Robert Gordon Rogers OC, OBC

24th Lieutenant-Governor of British Columbia
- In office 15 July 1983 – 9 September 1988
- Monarch: Elizabeth II
- Governors General: Edward Schreyer; Jeanne Sauvé
- Premier: Bill Bennett; Bill Vander Zalm
- Preceded by: Henry Pybus Bell-Irving
- Succeeded by: David Lam

Personal details
- Born: August 19, 1919 Montreal, Quebec
- Died: May 21, 2010 (aged 90) Victoria, British Columbia

Robert Gordon Rogers, OC OBC (August 19, 1919 – May 21, 2010) was the 24th Lieutenant Governor of British Columbia from 1983 to 1988.

Born in Montreal, he was a graduate of the University of Toronto Schools, the University of Toronto, and the Royal Military College of Canada in Kingston. During the Second World War, he served with the 1st Hussars of the Royal Canadian Armoured Corps, landing on Juno Beach on D-Day in 1944.

From 1991 to 1996, he served as Chancellor of the University of Victoria.

In 1989, he was made an Officer of the Order of Canada. In 1990, he was awarded the Order of British Columbia.

Rogers died on May 21, 2010.
