= Alan Abraham =

Lieutenant governor of Nova Scotia from 1984 to 1989

The Honourable Alan Rockwell Abraham CM ONS CD

27th Lieutenant Governor of Nova Scotia
- In office 1 February 1984 – 20 February 1989
- Monarch: Elizabeth II
- Governors General: Edward Schreyer; Jeanne Sauvé
- Premier: John Buchanan
- Preceded by: John Elvin Shaffner
- Succeeded by: Lloyd Crouse

Personal details
- Born: Alan Rockwell Abraham; February 1, 1931 Halifax, Nova Scotia
- Died: October 2, 2020 (aged 89) Halifax, Nova Scotia

Alan Rockwell Abraham CM ONS CD (1 February 1931 – 2 October 2020) was the 27th Lieutenant Governor of Nova Scotia.

== Career ==
Abraham, an engineering graduate from Saint Mary's University was involved in federal politics and helped with the organization of Prime Minister Pierre Trudeau's tours of the Maritimes. In 1983, Governor General Edward Schreyer, on the advice of Prime Minister Trudeau, appointed Abraham Lieutenant Governor of Nova Scotia. Abraham was the second youngest appointee as Lieutenant Governor of Nova Scotia since Confederation at the time of his appointment. He was then age 53; one of his predecessors, Hon. James Robson Douglas of Amherst, was 49 when he was appointed in 1925. Abraham died in 2020 at the age of 89.

== Awards and recognition ==
In 1996, he was made a Member of the Order of Canada. He received the Order of Nova Scotia when it was established in 2002.
