= Stan McKay =

Moderator of the United Church of Canada from 1992 to 1994

The Very Reverend Stan McKay
- 34th Moderator of the United Church of Canada
- Church: United Church of Canada
- Elected: August 17, 1992
- Term ended: 1994
- Predecessor: Walter H. Farquharson
- Successor: Marion Best

Orders
- Ordination: 1971

Personal details
- Born: Stanley John McKay; 1942 (age 83–84) Fisher River Cree Nation, Manitoba, Canada
- Education: University of Winnipeg

Stanley John McKay (born 1942), known as Stan McKay, is a Canadian Protestant minister from Fisher River Cree Nation, Manitoba. He served as the 34th Moderator of the United Church of Canada and is the first Indigenous person to have led a mainline Protestant denomination in Canada. He won an Indspire Award for Culture, Heritage, and Spirituality in 1997.

Religious titles
Preceded by Walter H. Farquharson	Moderator of the United Church of Canada; 1992–1994	Succeeded by Marion Best
