= Art Eggleton =

Canadian politician

The Honourable Art Eggleton PC
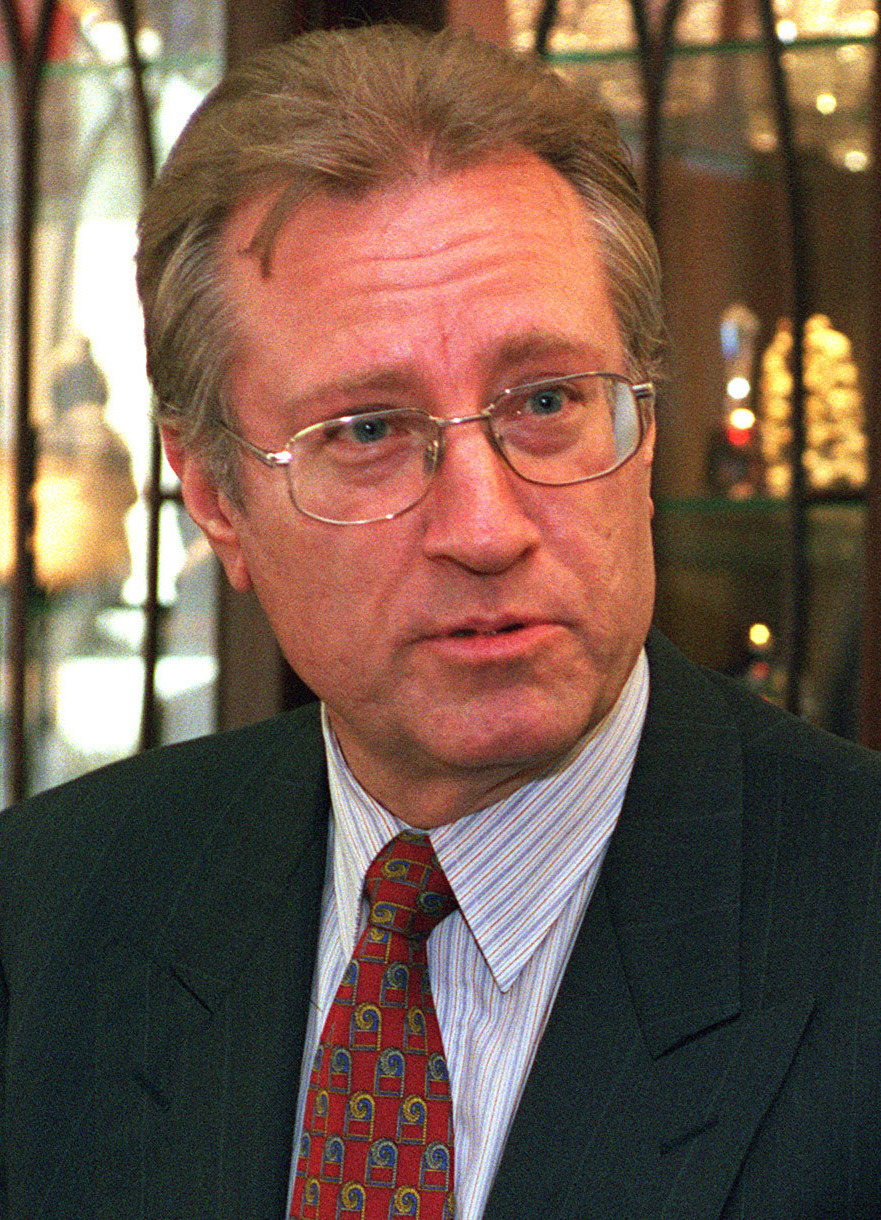
- Eggleton in 1999

Canadian Senator from Ontario
- In office March 24, 2005 – September 29, 2018
- Nominated by: Paul Martin
- Appointed by: Adrienne Clarkson

Member of Parliament for York Centre
- In office October 25, 1993 – June 28, 2004
- Preceded by: Bob Kaplan
- Succeeded by: Ken Dryden

59th Mayor of Toronto
- In office December 1, 1980 – November 30, 1991
- Preceded by: John Sewell
- Succeeded by: June Rowlands

Personal details
- Born: September 29, 1943 (age 82) Toronto, Ontario, Canada
- Party: Independent Liberal
- Other party: Liberal (until 2014)
- Spouse(s): Brenda Eggleton (m. 1978, div. 1994), Camille Bacchus
- Children: Stephanie Vass
- Occupation: Accountant
- Cabinet: Minister of National Defence (1997–2002); Minister for International Trade (1996–1997); Minister responsible for Infrastructure (1993–1996); President of the Treasury Board (1993–1996)

Arthur C. Eggleton PC (born September 29, 1943) is a retired Canadian politician who served as the 59th and longest-serving mayor of Toronto from 1980 to 1991. He was elected to Parliament in 1993, running as a Liberal in York Centre and served as a member of Parliament (MP) until 2004 when he declined to seek re-election. Eggleton held a number of cabinet positions from 1993 to 2002 including Treasury Board president, minister of infrastructure, minister of international trade, and minister of national defence. He was appointed to the Senate in 2005, serving until he reached the mandatory retirement age of 75 in 2018.

== City council ==
Eggleton, an accountant by profession, was first elected to Toronto City Council in the 1969 municipal election as the junior alderman for Ward 4. He served as budget chief in the council elected in 1973 under David Crombie. He was the Liberal Party candidate in the October 16, 1978, federal by-election held in Toronto's west-end Parkdale electoral district in which he was defeated by Progressive Conservative candidate Yuri Shymko. He ran for re-election to Toronto City Council in Ward 4. finishing first in a field of 10 candidates to become Ward 4's senior alderman on council (at the time, two alderman were elected from each ward).

== Mayor of Toronto ==
Eggleton was a member of Toronto City Council and the Metropolitan Toronto Council for 22 years. He was Mayor of Toronto from 1980 to 1991, when he retired from municipal politics as the longest-serving mayor in Toronto history.

In 1980, he was elected Mayor of Toronto, defeating incumbent John Sewell. The city moved forward on implementing its new official plan, which resulted in several new significant buildings in the downtown west, or the railway lands area, including the Convention Centre, the SkyDome, and the CBC Broadcast Centre. During Eggleton's time as mayor, he prioritized social and economic development, and the City of Toronto produced a record level of social housing projects for low-income people; 50 acres (20 ha) of new parks; and innovative new responses to the problems of the homeless and emotionally-troubled with projects like Street City, the Singles Housing Opportunities Program, and the Gernsteins Centre.

As Canada's economic centre moved from Montreal to Toronto in response to the then-separatist government of Quebec, Toronto saw a significant increase in economic growth during his time as Mayor, with steadily decreasing unemployment through the 1980s and into the early 1990s.

Eggleton established the Mayor's Committee on Community and Race Relations to help bring about the successful integration of people from different cultural, racial, and ethnic backgrounds.

Eggleton supported the expansion and improvement of Toronto's parks and green spaces, including the creation of new parks and the development of existing ones. In 1984, Eggleton assisted the Minister of Environment in opening the Martin Goodman Trail, named for the president and editor-in-chief of the Toronto Star, who died three years previously.

In the 1980s Mayor Eggleton was instrumental in the creation of "FoodShare", an organization that advocates for the right to food, in a bid to prevent dependence on food charity from becoming embedded in the city. In June 2018 Eggleton introduced a bill to the Senate to create Canada's first National Food Program, which received support from the Government of Canada in 2019.

During his tenure as mayor, Eggleton faced criticism for steps he took in addressing the concerns of Torontonians in the LGBTQ community. After Operation Soap in 1981, where there were mass arrests of men in the city's gay bathhouses, despite stating he had no foreknowledge that the raids would take place, Eggleton and Toronto City Council commissioned law student and journalist Arnold Bruner to conduct an inquiry into the relationship between the gay community and the police. Bruner's report Out of the Closet: Study of Relations Between Homosexual Community and Police, was released in 1981. It recognized the gay community as a legitimate community and called for a permanent dialogue between the LGBTQ community and the Toronto Police. The report contained 16 recommendations, although many were only implemented decades later.

In Eggleton's first term as mayor, Pride Toronto was created partly as a response to Operation Soap. During this time, Eggleton faced some criticism for choosing not to designate a recognized City of Toronto day for the Pride Parade, and not attending Pride Parades. In 1990, Toronto Pride organizers filed a complaint with the Ontario Human Rights Commission after Eggleton did not officially declare the day. Eggleton later acknowledged these concerns and stated that "I did not at the time see the parade as being the usual kind of event for a mayor’s declaration", that he had "come to see it differently and in more recent times…participated in the parade. I see it as part of celebrating an inclusionary society and the contributions of the LGBTQ community in Toronto". During his mayoralty, the city bid for Expo 2000, losing to Hanover, Germany.

As mayor, Eggleton appeared before a committee of the provincial legislature advocating for an amendment to the Human Rights Code to include sexual orientation in the anti-discrimination clause. Eggleton also voted in favour of Bill C-38 also known as the Civil Marriage Act which legalized same-sex marriage in Canada.

Eggleton's only serious re-election challenge occurred at the 1985 Toronto municipal election when city councillor Anne Johnston, a fellow Liberal, ran against Eggleton for the mayoralty. Eggleton won by a significant margin, receiving 92,994 votes to Johnston's 59,817.

In recognition of his service to the city, Eggleton received Toronto's highest honour, the Civic Award of Merit in 1992.

== Member of Parliament and Cabinet Minister ==
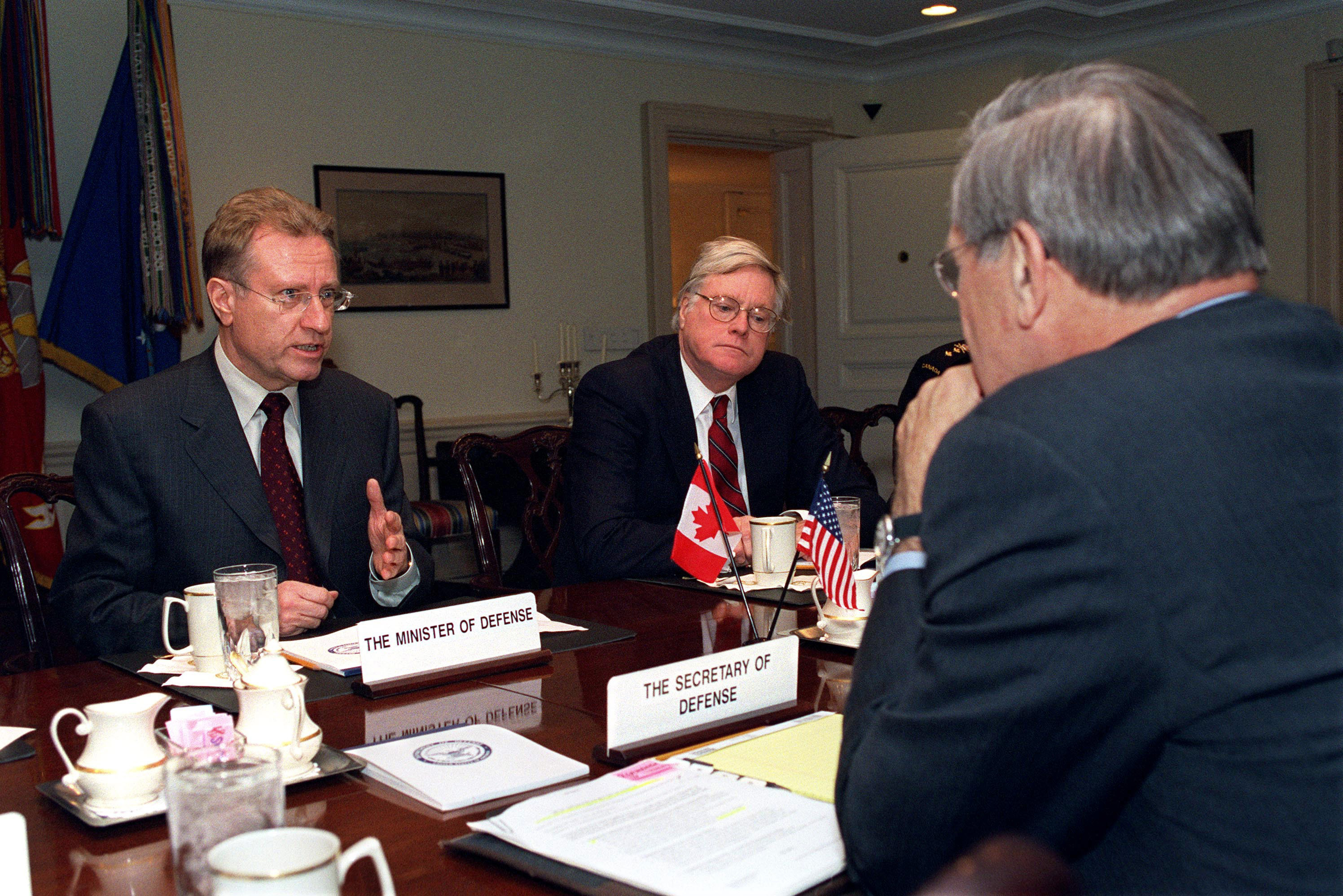
Defence Minister Art Eggleton (left) and the Canadian Ambassador to the U.S. Michael Kergin (center) meets the Honorable Donald H. Rumsfeld (right), U.S. Secretary of Defense in 2001

Eggleton ran in the 1993 election in the suburban Toronto riding of York Centre, again as a Liberal, and won election. He was appointed to the position of President of the Treasury Board and Minister for Infrastructure in the new cabinet.

From January 1996 to June 1997, he served as Minister for International Trade. Eggleton retained his seat in the 1997 election, and was appointed Minister of National Defence. In 1999, Eggleton supported Canada's involvement in NATO's campaign in Kosovo.

He was re-elected again in the 2000 election, and continued as Minister of Defence, focusing on sweeping changes to the National Defence Act which implemented changes to the military justice system, including the set up of several oversight entities including the nation's first ever Military Ombudsman and a Military Police Complaints Commission. These entities would provide another level of conflict resolution for military members and civilian employees. He also improved compensation and benefits for Canadian Forces personnel and their families dedicating roughly $700 million in funding to provide housing and pay under the quality of life program. In November 1999, Eggleton established a new ministerial advisory board focused on gender integration and employment equity in the Canadian Armed Forces.

During his tenure, Canada continued to contribute to international peacekeeping ventures in the Balkans, the Central African Republic, and the Persian Gulf. Eggleton led Canadian participation in the NATO intervention in Kosovo pushing Serbian troops out of the region. Eggleton at the time defended Canadian participation in the NATO air campaign stating he was convinced it was the right thing to do, citing the effects of the Serb military assault, and the mass graves containing the bodies of ethnic Albanians. Eggleton toured Canadian peacekeeping forces in Bosnia-Herzegovina, Macedonia, Kosovo and the Central African Republic.

The Canadian Forces Disaster Assistance Response Team (DART) was also deployed to Honduras for the first time to aid Hurricane Mitch relief efforts. In addition to peacekeeping, Eggleton continued Canadian participation within the United Nations, NORAD and NATO.

Eggleton pushed for increased procurement of equipment and the continued modernization of the Canadian Armed Forces during his time as Minister for National Defence.

In January 2002, Chrétien and Eggleton were accused of misleading Parliament. Both Chrétien and Eggleton when asked in Question Period if Canadian troops had handed over captured Taliban and al-Qaeda members in Afghanistan to the American forces amid concerns about the treatment of POWs at Guantanamo Bay, replied that was in Chrétien's words only a "hypothetical question" and that the Canadians had taken no POWs. Critics of the government such as Joe Clark then proceeded to point out that in the previous week, the Toronto newspaper the Globe & Mail had run on its frontpage a photo of Canadian soldiers turning over POWs to American troops. Eggleton maintained that he and the rest of the Cabinet had been kept unaware that the Canadian Forces were taking POWs in Afghanistan and turning them over to the Americans, claiming that he had only learned of the policy of handing over POWs several days after the photo had appeared in the Globe & Mail.

Eggleton stepped down from cabinet in May 2002, amid allegations of a breach of cabinet minister conflict guidelines by hiring a former girlfriend for a research contract and after ethics counsellor, Howard Wilson, concluded Eggleton breached conflict guidelines for cabinet ministers. Conservative Leader Joe Clark criticized Jean Chrétien's decision to move Eggleton to the backbenches, citing similar accusations towards another Liberal MP Don Boudria and their continued membership in Chrétien's cabinet. Stephen Harper also criticized Chrétien's decision stating "He's sending the message that he defends his friends, and he sticks by his own positions." This happened during the growing leadership turmoil between Prime Minister Jean Chrétien and Paul Martin, who left the cabinet the following week in disputed circumstances. Increased scrutiny on Chrétien's government and cabinet may have contributed to Prime Minister Jean Chrétien pressuring him to resign.

Eggleton then became a member of the Standing Committee on Foreign Affairs and Trade. On May 13, 2004, Eggleton announced he would not be a candidate in the 2004 federal election, making way for the nomination of Ken Dryden as the Liberal candidate in York Centre.

== Senator for Ontario ==
He was appointed to the Senate by Paul Martin on March 24, 2005. He served as both chair and Deputy Chair of the Standing Senate Committee on Social Affairs, Science, and Technology for 12 years in which his focus was on social justice and health care issues. He served on the Bureau of Liberal International, representing the Liberal Party of Canada, as a vice-president for two years and treasurer for one year. He was co-opted to the Bureau of Liberal International as a vice president at the 185th Executive Committee in Cape Town, South Africa in November 2010. Art Eggleton also served on the Senate Modernization Committee, and at different times on the National Finance, Transportation and Communications committees.

On January 29, 2014, Liberal Party leader Justin Trudeau announced all Liberal Senators, including Eggleton, were removed from the Liberal caucus, and would continue sitting as Independents. The Senators will refer to themselves as the Senate Liberal Caucus even though they are no longer members of the parliamentary Liberal caucus.

Eggleton's recent focus has been Toronto's community housing. On the Social Affairs Committee he has been instrumental in studies and reports on such matters as poverty, housing, and homelessness; early learning and child care; autism; the Health Accord; prescription pharmaceuticals; obesity; and dementia. In 2012, he founded the All-Party, Anti-Poverty Caucus.

He also started and convened the Open Caucus a non-partisan discussion open to all Senators and MPs on major issues of the day bringing together expert panelists to dialogue with parliamentarians.

In 2015–16, in addition to his Senate work, he served as the volunteer chair of the Toronto Mayor's Task force on Toronto Community Housing which recommended substantive reforms for the largest social housing provider in Canada. Many of the recommendations are now in different stages of implementation.

Eggleton retired from the Senate on September 29, 2018, upon reaching the mandatory retirement age of 75.

== Notable work ==
In July 2018, Eggleton wrote, with fellow Canadian Senator Raymonde Saint-Germain, calling for an update to Canadian privacy legislation, adapting it to protect people's data given the rise of new technologies.

Eggleton was the Chair of the World Council on City Data's advisory board. The World Council on City Data is an organization that tracks standardized city data across the world to help achieve sustainable development goals.

In the early stages of the COVID-19 pandemic in April 2020, Eggleton wrote with Canadian political commentator Hugh Segal arguing for a basic income program in Canada, both supporting efforts in the Canadian Senate to establish such a policy.

In November 2021, Eggleton, with a human rights activist Rabia Khedr, called for Canada to fast track the Canada Disability Benefit and follow through with legislation to reduce disability poverty tabled by the Canadian government. Eggleton also published an e-book with four other authors make the case for basic income in Canada.

Eggleton serves on the board of directors of Toronto Kiwanis Boys and Girls Club, a charity that offers social service to youth in Toronto. As a boy in the late 1940s and early 1950s, Eggleton attended and is now a member of the Kiwanis Club of Toronto.

He is also a vice-president of Liberal International, an international consortium of liberal and progressive democratic political parties and citizen groups headquartered in London, England and promoting liberal democracy and liberal values as well as being president of the Canadian Group of Liberal International.

Parliament of Canada
26th Canadian Ministry (1993–2003) – Cabinet of Jean Chrétien
Cabinet posts (3)
Predecessor	Office	Successor
Doug Young	Minister of National Defence; 1997–2002	John McCallum
Roy MacLaren	Minister for International Trade; 1996–1997	Sergio Marchi
Jim Edwards	President of the Treasury Board; 1993–1996	Marcel Massé
Special Cabinet Responsibilities
Predecessor	Title	Successor
position created	Minister responsible for Infrastructure; 1993–1996	Marcel Massé
