= Bill McKnight =

Canadian politician (1940–2019)

The Honourable Bill McKnight PC SOM
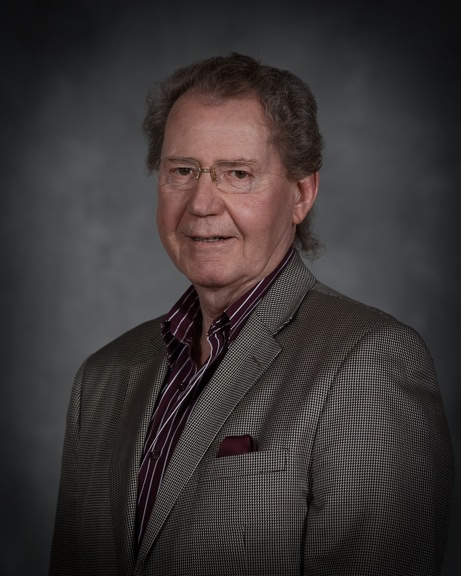

Minister of Energy, Mines, and Resources
- In office January 4, 1993 – June 24, 1993
- Prime Minister: Brian Mulroney
- Preceded by: Arthur Jacob Epp
- Succeeded by: Bobbie Sparrow

Minister of Agriculture
- In office April 21, 1991 – January 3, 1993
- Prime Minister: Brian Mulroney
- Preceded by: Don Mazankowski
- Succeeded by: Charles Mayer

Minister of National Defence
- In office January 30, 1989 – April 20, 1991
- Prime Minister: Brian Mulroney
- Preceded by: Perrin Beatty
- Succeeded by: Marcel Masse

Minister of Indian Affairs and Northern Development
- In office June 30, 1986 – January 29, 1989
- Prime Minister: Brian Mulroney
- Preceded by: David Crombie
- Succeeded by: Pierre Cadieux

Minister of Labour
- In office September 17, 1984 – June 30, 1986
- Prime Minister: Brian Mulroney
- Preceded by: André Ouellet
- Succeeded by: Pierre Cadieux

Member of Parliament for Kindersley—Lloydminster
- In office May 22, 1979 – October 25, 1993
- Preceded by: Riding established
- Succeeded by: Elwin Hermanson

Personal details
- Born: William Hunter McKnight; July 12, 1940 Elrose, Saskatchewan, Canada
- Died: October 4, 2019 (aged 79) Saskatoon, Saskatchewan, Canada
- Party: Progressive Conservative
- Occupation: Politician, farmer

William Hunter McKnight PC SOM (July 12, 1940 – October 4, 2019) was a Canadian politician who served in the Canadian House of Commons from 1979 to 1993. During the government of Brian Mulroney, he served in various cabinet roles such as Minister of National Defence and Minister of Agriculture. He also served as the Treaty Commissioner for the Province of Saskatchewan.

== Biography ==
Born in Wartime, Saskatchewan, he served as Minister of Agriculture, Minister of Indian Affairs and Northern Development, Minister of National Defence during the first Gulf War, Minister of Energy, Mines and Resources and Minister of Labour in the Progressive Conservative government of Brian Mulroney. He was sworn into the Queen's Privy Council for Canada on September 17, 1984. He was the Honorary Chief of the Muskeg Lake Cree Nation. A 36-acre (15 ha) parcel of commercial land in Saskatoon was named after McKnight by the Muskeg Lake Cree Nation in recognition of his role in creating federal policy for Land Claims Settlements. It is known as the McKnight Commercial Centre. McKnight died in Saskatoon on October 4, 2019, at the age of 79.

== Honours ==
He was a Member of the Saskatchewan Order of Merit.

== Archives ==
There is a William Hunter (Bill) McKnight fonds at Library and Archives Canada.

Parliament of Canada
| Preceded by None | Member of Parliament from Kindersley—Lloydminster; 1979–1993 | Succeeded by Elwin Hermanson |
Political offices
| Preceded by André Ouellet | Minister of Energy, Mines and Resources; 1993 | Succeeded by Bobbie Sparrow |
| Preceded by David Crombie | Minister of Indian Affairs and Northern Development; 1986–1989 | Succeeded by Pierre Cadieux |
