= Gilbert Finn =

Canadian politician

The Honourable Gilbert Finn OC ONB

26th Lieutenant Governor of New Brunswick
- In office August 20, 1987 – June 21, 1994
- Monarch: Elizabeth II
- Governors General: Jeanne Sauvé; Ray Hnatyshyn
- Premier: Richard Hatfield; Frank McKenna
- Preceded by: George Stanley
- Succeeded by: Margaret McCain

Personal details
- Born: September 3, 1920 Inkerman, New Brunswick, Canada
- Died: January 7, 2015 (aged 94) Moncton, New Brunswick, Canada
- Profession: Businessman

Gilbert Finn OC ONB (September 3, 1920 – January 7, 2015) was a Canadian businessman and was the 26th Lieutenant Governor of New Brunswick from 1987 to 1994.

Born in Inkerman, New Brunswick, he received a Bachelor of Arts degree from Laval University in 1944. In 1974 he was made a Member of the Order of Canada and was promoted to Officer in 1979. In 2008 he returned his insignia of the Order in protest of the appointment of Henry Morgentaler, but never formally resigned his appointment to the Order.

== Arms ==
Coat of arms of Gilbert Finn

Notes
The arms of Gilbert Finn consist of:
Crest
Above a helmet mantled Azure doubled Or on a wreath Or and Azure a demi-boar Or armed Argent unguled and wearing a coronet of maple leaves alternating with fiddlehead fronds Azure holding between its forelegs a hand of justice terminating in a fleur-de-lys Gules winged Argent garnished Or.
Escutcheon
Azure a mullet anglé of five mullets Or.
Supporters
Dexter a sea deer Or attired and gorged with a collar Azure charged with bezants sinister a sea cougar Or gorged with a like collar.
Compartment
A grassy mound sprinkled with purple violets proper rising above waves of the sea Azure crested Argent.
Motto
Ensemble Nous Sommes Forts

== See also ==
- Université Laval
