= John Crow =

Governor of the Bank of Canada from 1987 to 1994

5th Governor of the Bank of Canada
- In office February 1, 1987 – February 1, 1994
- Appointed by: Mulroney Ministry
- Preceded by: Gerald Bouey
- Succeeded by: Gordon Thiessen

Personal details
- Born: John William Crow; 22 January 1937 (age 89) London, England
- Education: Balliol College, Oxford

John William Crow OC (born 22 January 1937) is a Canadian economist who was the fifth governor of the Bank of Canada from 1987 to 1994, succeeding Gerald Bouey. He was succeeded by Gordon Thiessen.

Born in London, England, he went to Parmiter's School also he served with the Royal Air Force for two years before receiving a degree in Philosophy, Politics and Economics from the University of Oxford in 1961. He spent the next decade at the International Monetary Fund and was appointed Chief of the North American division in 1970.

In 1973, he joined the research department of the Bank of Canada as Deputy Chief and became chief about a year later. He was appointed Adviser to the Governor in 1979 and Deputy Governor in May 1981.

He was a director of Placer Dome from 1999 until it was acquired by Barrick Gold in 2006. He is also the president of J&R Crow Inc.

In 2009, he was made an Officer of the Order of Canada "for his leadership in the area of Canada’s monetary policy, notably as governor of the Bank of Canada, and for his involvement with the International Monetary Fund".
