= Benoît Bouchard =

Canadian politician

The Honourable Benoît Bouchard PC CM

Canadian commissioner at the International Joint Commission
- In office 2013–2017

Chair of the Transportation Safety Board of Canada
- In office 1996–2001

Member of Parliament for Roberval
- In office September 4, 1984 – June 17, 1993
- Preceded by: Suzanne Beauchamp-Niquet
- Succeeded by: Michel Gauthier

Personal details
- Born: April 16, 1940 (age 85) Roberval, Quebec, Canada
- Party: Progressive Conservative
- Occupation: teacher, public official, politician

Benoît Bouchard PC CM (French pronunciation: [bənwa buʃaʁ]; born April 16, 1940) is a Canadian public official and former politician.

== Biography ==
After a career as a professor and teacher, Bouchard was elected to the House of Commons of Canada as the Progressive Conservative Member of Parliament for Roberval in the 1984 election. He was immediately elevated to Prime Minister Brian Mulroney's Cabinet as Minister of State for Transport.

In 1985, he was promoted to Secretary of State for Canada. He subsequently served as Minister of Employment and Immigration (June 30, 1986 – March 30, 1988), Minister of Transport (March 31, 1988 – February 22, 1990), Minister of Industry, Science and Technology (February 23, 1990 – April 20, 1991), and Minister of National Health and Welfare (April 21, 1991 – June 1993).

In 1989, the federal budget mandated fiscal cuts to a broad range of departments and agencies, one of which was Bouchard's ministry at Transport Canada. As part of his department's efforts to cut its budget, Bouchard authorized Transport Canada to slash the subsidy to the national intercity passenger railway, Via Rail by 55%. Responding to the cuts, Bouchard said in a television interview several weeks later: "Ten years from now, no one will remember Benoît Bouchard cut Via Rail".

He retired from politics in June 1993 to accept an appointment as Canada's Ambassador to France.

In 1996, Bouchard returned to Canada and was appointed Chair of the Transportation Safety Board of Canada by Liberal Prime Minister Jean Chrétien. He oversaw the Canadian portion of the investigation of the Swissair Flight 111 air crash. He retired from the board in 2001.

In 2012, he was made a Member of the Order of Canada. Between 2013 and 2017, Benoît Bouchard was a Canadian commissioner at the International Joint Commission.

Diplomatic posts
Preceded by Claude Talbot Charland	Ambassador Extraordinary and Plenipotentiary to France; 1993–1996	Succeeded by Jacques Sylva Roy
