= John Allen Fraser =

Canadian politician (1931–2024)

The Honourable John Allen Fraser PC OC OBC CD KC
- Fraser in 1987

32nd Speaker of the House of Commons
- In office September 30, 1986 – January 16, 1994
- Preceded by: John Bosley
- Succeeded by: Gilbert Parent

Minister of Fisheries and Oceans
- In office September 17, 1984 – September 23, 1985
- Prime Minister: Brian Mulroney
- Preceded by: Herb Breau
- Succeeded by: Erik Nielsen (interim)

Minister of the Environment
- In office June 4, 1979 – March 2, 1980
- Prime Minister: Joe Clark
- Preceded by: Leonard Marchand
- Succeeded by: John Roberts

Member of Parliament for Vancouver South
- In office October 30, 1972 – October 25, 1993
- Preceded by: Arthur Laing
- Succeeded by: Herb Dhaliwal

Personal details
- Born: December 15, 1931 Yokohama, Empire of Japan
- Died: April 7, 2024 (aged 92) Vancouver, British Columbia, Canada
- Party: Progressive Conservative

John Allen Fraser PC OC OBC CD KC (December 15, 1931 – April 7, 2024) was a Canadian politician who was speaker of the House of Commons from 1986 to 1994. He also served as Canada's Minister of the Environment, Minister of Fisheries and Oceans and Ambassador to the United Nations for the Environment.

== Life and career ==
Fraser was born on December 15, 1931, in Yokohama, Japan, where his father was working as a lumber salesman. His parents returned to British Columbia when Fraser was four years old. He grew up and was educated there and graduated from the University of British Columbia Faculty of Law in Spring 1954. Fraser first won a seat in Parliament in the 1972 general election as a Progressive Conservative from Vancouver. He stood as a candidate at the 1976 Progressive Conservative leadership convention to replace Robert Stanfield, but did poorly and withdrew after the first ballot. He was re-elected in 1974, 1979, 1980, 1984, and 1988.

In 1979, Fraser became Minister of the Environment in the short-lived government of Joe Clark, returning to the Opposition benches in 1980. He returned to the Cabinet in the wake of Brian Mulroney's landslide victory in the 1984 federal election and became Minister of Fisheries and Oceans. He was forced to resign in 1985 as a result of the "Tainted Tuna" affair.

In 1986, he became Speaker of the House of Commons of Canada, the first to be elected by fellow Members of Parliament, and served in that capacity until his retirement from politics in 1993.

In January 1994, Fraser was appointed as Canada's Ambassador to the United Nations for the Environment, a post he served until December 1997.

Fraser died in Vancouver on April 7, 2024, at the age of 92.

== Honours ==
In 1995, he was made an Officer of the Order of Canada. In 2002, he was the recipient of the Vimy Award, which recognizes a Canadian "who has made a significant and outstanding contribution to the defence and security of our nation and the preservation of our democratic values."

== Arms ==
Coat of arms of John Allen Fraser
Crest Issuant from a coronet rim Argent set with maple leaves Gules alternating with thistle flowers Argent a demi cougar Azure holding in its dexter forepaw the baton of office of the Speaker of the House of Commons of Canada; that is a rod Vert at either end tipped and dovetailed inwards Argent ensigned with a lion sejant Argent its dexter forepaw resting on a coronet érablé Argent the rim set with twelve jewels Gules Escutcheon Azure on a chevron between three fraises Argent three roses Gules Supporters On a grassy mound strewn with shamrocks Vert two cougars Sable semé of fraises Or gorged with wing collars Argent Motto NOUS SOMMES PREST (French for 'We Are Ready') Orders Officer of the Order of Canada: Desiderantes meliorem patriam (English for 'They desire a better country'); Member of the Order of British Columbia Badge A cougar's head erased Azure gorged with a coronet erablé Or the rim charged with three fraises Gules
