= History of the United Church of Canada =

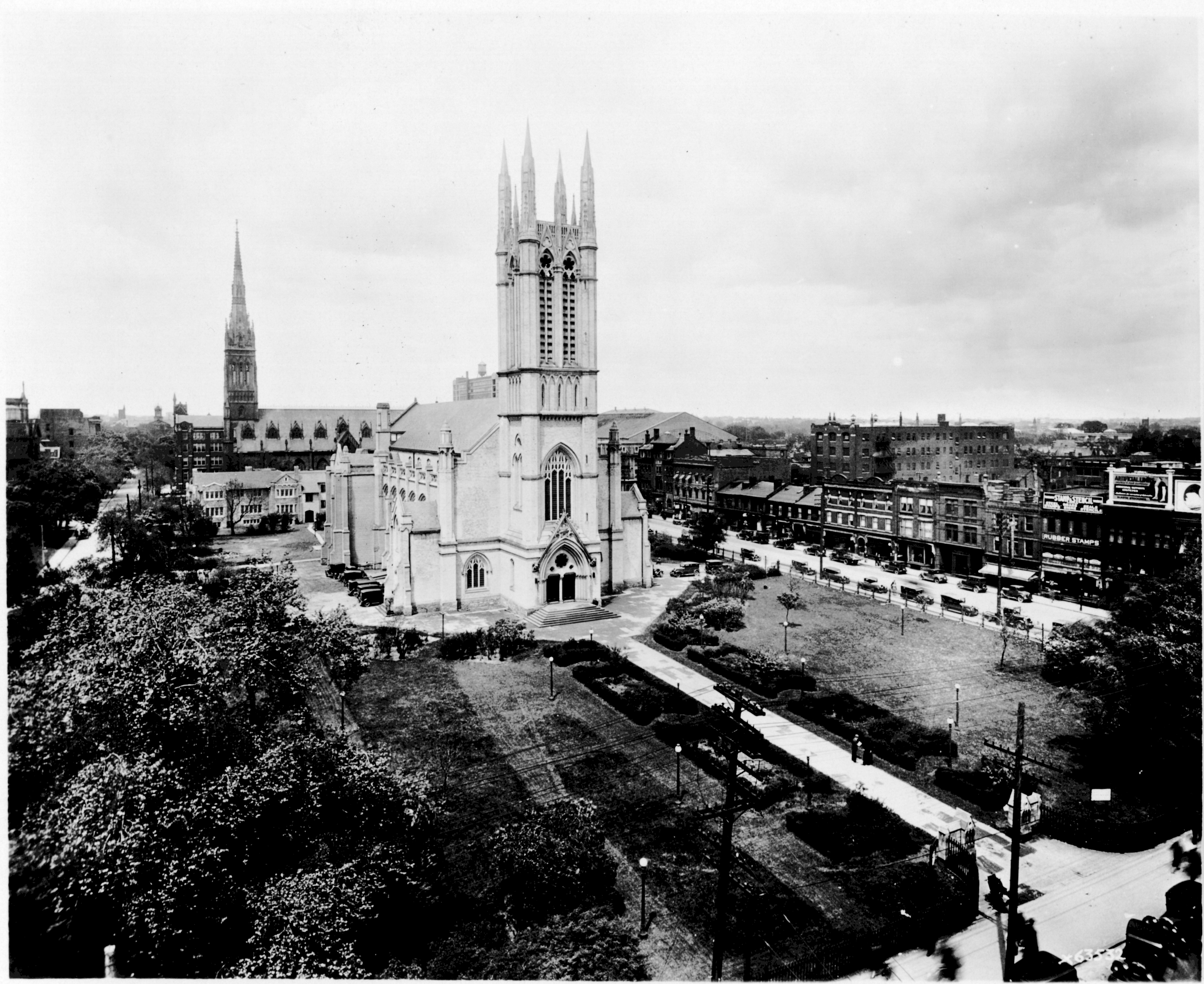
Metropolitan United Church, formerly Metropolitan Methodist Church, hosted the United Church of Canada's first General Council.

The history of the United Church of Canada begins in the early 20th century and followed the establishment of national organizations for several Christian denominations in Canada. Three major denominations supported a national church for Protestants in Canada: Presbyterians, Methodists, and Congregationalists. Negotiations between these denominations culminated in the formation of the United Church of Canada in 1925. Though the union included nearly all Methodist congregations in Canada, a minority of Presbyterians voted against union and remained separate from the other denominations as the Presbyterian Church in Canada.

At the time of formation, the United Church was the largest Protestant denomination in Canada. Its early activities included the establishment of the Woman's Missionary Society, the running of hospitals, international missions, and residential schools for the assimilation of Indigenous children. The church also supported the establishment of a Canadian welfare state and ordained its first female minister in 1936. During the Second World War, the church was embroiled in a debate over pacifism; church leadership generally supported the war effort but resisted the implementation of conscription in Canada. After reaching its peak membership in the 1960s, the United Church and other Protestant churches in Canada began to lose affiliates. The church introduced the theologically liberal New Curriculum in 1962 and sponsored draft evaders from the United States during the Vietnam War. The last residential school run by the United Church closed in 1973; after the abuse of Indigenous students at residential schools was brought to public attention, the church apologized for the schools in 1998.

After failed merger negotiations with the Anglican Church of Canada, the church experienced further losses in membership. These losses were compounded after the ordination of gays and lesbians was permitted within the church. The United Church continued to endorse progressive campaigns into the 21st century: it supported the legalization of same-sex marriage in Canada and was against the criminalization of abortion. In the 2010s, the church boycotted goods from Israeli settlements and investigated Gretta Vosper, an atheist minister; the boycott and ultimate decision to allow Vosper to minister was the source of controversy within and outside the church. Due to a continued decline in membership, several United Church buildings were sold or redeveloped to carry housing.

== Beginnings ==
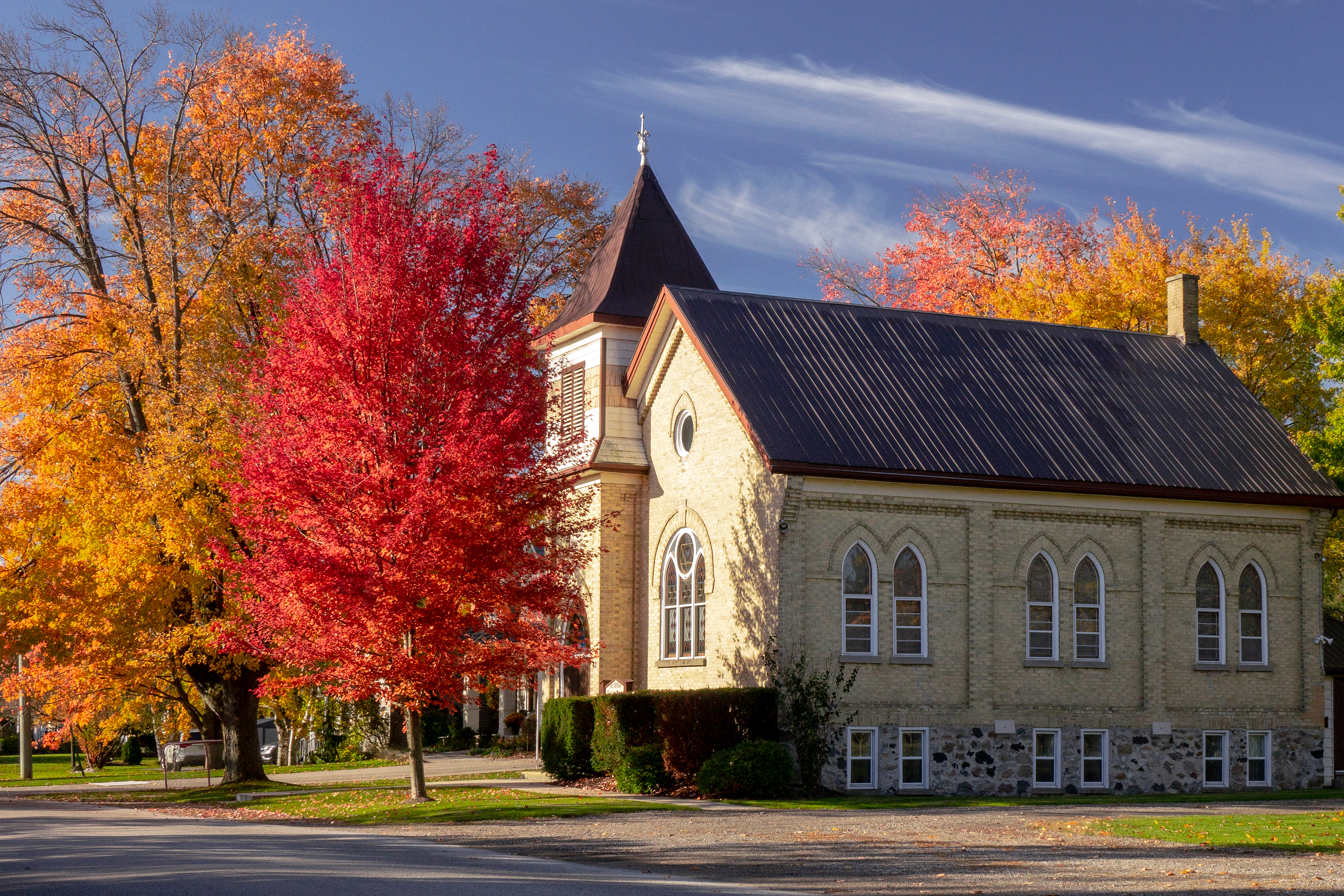
Example of a United Church in a small community (West Montrose, Ontario; built c. 1907)

After the formation of national organizations for Canadian Presbyterians in 1875, Methodists in 1884, and Congregationalists in 1906, several conferences were held between these denominations to discuss a united Protestant church within the country. These discussions coincided with the establishment of local churches in the Prairies that served Methodists and Presbyterians alike, many of whom came together to form the General Council of Local Union Churches in 1912. Motivated by a de facto union in the western provinces and the desire to have a national church for English-speaking Canadians, a committee of Congregationalists, Methodists, and Presbyterians produced a document called the Basis of Union in 1908. The document, which outlined the Protestant doctrines and governance structure of the proposed united church, was soon ratified by the national Methodist and Congregationalist organizations. The Basis of Union de-emphasized theological differences between the uniting denominations; neither the doctrine of predestination characteristic of Presbyterian faith nor Methodist concept of entire sanctification were named. As a condition for their entry into the union, Congregationalists stipulated that ministers could be in "essential agreement" with the church's doctrines instead of literally subscribing to the tenets, as their denomination historically eschewed creeds in favor of personal declarations of faith.

In 1921, the General Council of Local Union Churches entered the church merger process in 1921, leaving the uniting church with four denominations in total. However, not all elements of the churches involved were happy with the idea of uniting under one roof; a substantial number of Presbyterians remained unconvinced of the virtues of church union. The Presbyterian Church held several votes at the congregation level regarding merger with the Methodists and Congregationalists, concluding in a final vote in 1925 in which a third of Presbyterian congregations chose to remain separate from the other denominations as a continuing church.

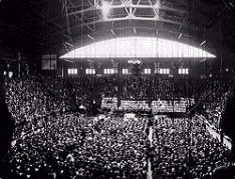
Inauguration of United Church at Mutual Street Arena, Toronto, on June 10, 1925

To finalize the process of church union, church leaders approached individual provinces and the government of Canada to pass legislation on the transfer of property rights. The resultant bill passed swiftly in Manitoba, but faced a period of opposition in Prince Edward Island and Ontario. With the provision that individual churches could vote to remain outside the union, the federal United Church of Canada Act passed, June 27, 1924, and was effective June 10, 1925. On the same day, the United Church of Canada was inaugurated at a large worship service at Toronto's Mutual Street Arena, becoming the first major interdenominational union in the English-speaking world. Hymns from its major denominations were printed on a 38-page order of service and sung: "All people that on earth do dwell" from the Presbyterians; "O for a thousand tongues to sing" by the Methodist leader Charles Wesley; "O God of Bethel" from the Congregationalists; and "When I survey the wondrous cross" by the nonconformist hymn-writer Isaac Watts.

The ecumenical tone of the new church was set at its first General Council, which was held at the formerly Methodist Metropolitan United Church. The former Methodist General Superintendent, Samuel Dwight Chown, was considered by the General Council to be the leading candidate to become the United Church's first Moderator because of his denomination's overwhelming support for union. However, in a surprise move, Chown stepped aside in favour of George C. Pidgeon, the moderator of the Presbyterian Church and principal spokesperson for the uniting Presbyterians, in hopes of preventing partisanship from emerging between the union's two largest denominations. The United Church became Canada's largest Protestant denomination after its 1925 incorporation, and was joined by the Synod of the Wesleyan Methodist Church of Bermuda in 1930. The Canadian church's early activities included the establishment of the Woman's Missionary Society, the running of hospitals, international missions, and residential schools for the assimilation of Indigenous children.

== Early 20th Century ==
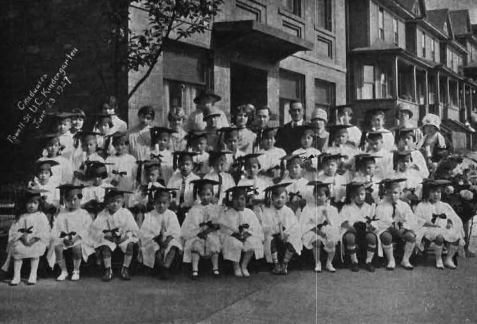
A graduating kindergarten class of Japanese immigrants to Canada, taught by the Woman's Missionary Society

The church's finances were devastated by the Great Depression, leading to the closure of several pastoral charges. Competing social movements within the church advocated for different responses to the era's crises. This ranged from the Fellowship for a Christian Social Order, which championed radical Christian socialist ideals, to the conservative Oxford Group, which emphasized personal morality. Church leadership occupied a middle position; they were invited to the Royal Commission on Dominion–Provincial Relations and supported measures that would lead to the Canadian welfare state, such as the federal funding of pensions. Along with supporting the legalization of divorce on grounds of adultery in 1932, the United Church began to ordain women during the 1930s. Though some Methodists had been ordaining women from 1880 in the United States, it was not until 1936 that the Reverend Lydia Emelie Gruchy of the Saskatchewan Conference became the first woman in the United Church to be ordained and, in 1953, she became the first Canadian woman to receive an honorary Doctor of Divinity degree. However, the church maintained its predominantly male clergy for decades afterwards; only 4% of the clergy was female by 1978.

The church's response to the Second World War was divided between pacifists and those who supported the war effort. 65 clergy members signed the pacifist declaration A Witness Against War in 1939, and the General Council declined to support the national implementation of conscription. At the same time, the church provided chaplaincy services to the military and saw to profit from members purchasing war bonds in its name. Responding to the forced relocation of Japanese Canadians, the General Council announced in 1942 that it "recognizes the need of such action" and that it planned "to follow them with its ministry and to assure them of sympathy." Local church leaders in British Columbia directly opposed the government's measure by establishing an Emergency Japanese Committee to advocate for those who were relocated, while the Woman's Missionary Society provided education to interred teenagers in lieu of the provincial government. With the goal of furthering ecumenical dialogue, the United Church was one of the founding bodies of the Canadian Council of Churches in 1944 and the World Council of Churches in 1946.

== Late 20th Century ==
The period between 1945 and the early 1960s was marked by a surge in active members, brought on by the baby boom and evangelistic campaigns in Canada. In 1962, two women's auxiliary organizations, Woman's Association and Woman's Missionary Society, joined to form the United Church Women. The high tide mark of membership was reached in 1965 when the church recorded 1,064,000 members; it was followed by the addition of new congregations after the eastern Canada Conference of the Evangelical United Brethren merged with the United Church in 1968.

However, there were already rumblings of discontent in the church: the theologically liberal New Curriculum, unveiled in 1962 by the church's educational ministries, was met with both internal and external criticism and was followed by the loss of 100,000 children from its Sunday school services, exacerbating a downward trend that had begun years prior. These trends were accompanied the release of Pierre Berton's book The Comfortable Pew, a bestseller which castigated Canadian Protestant churches for their "outdated theological and ethical positions." In 1966, the United Church lost 2,027 members, marking the first time since amalgamation that membership had fallen. The loss was concurrent with similar drops in affiliation within the major Protestant denominations in Canada. During the late 1960s, the United Church moved away from traditional evangelism with its National Project, an outreach campaign that prioritized social concerns such as poverty and war.

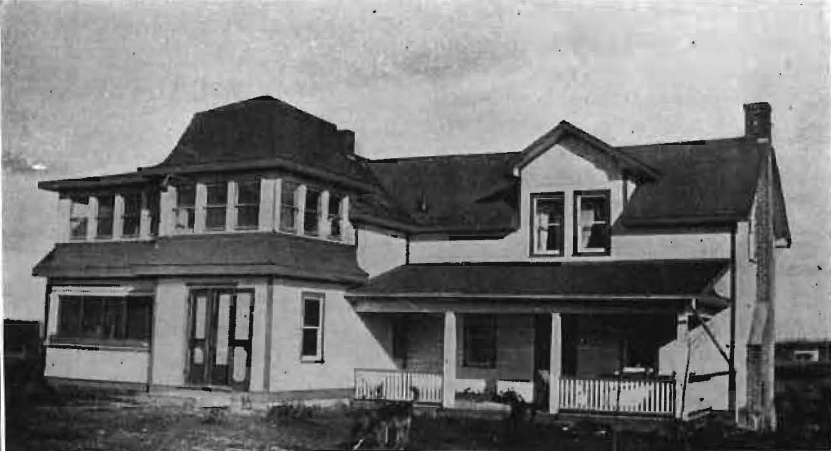
The United Church operated Rosedale Memorial Hospital (pictured) in rural Matheson, Ontario from the 1920s, and ended its services after a new hospital was built in 1958.

The church continued to develop its official agenda on domestic issues: in the 1950s, the General Council softened its position of total abstinence towards alcohol use and called for the adoption of universal health care. The church relinquished its rural hospitals as a response to an increasing number of rural Canadians who were able to access government-funded municipal hospitals. In 1962, delegates from the General Council affirmed their support for remarriage after divorce, contraception for married couples, and the legitimacy of employing women in the workforce. The last United Church residential school closed in 1973, but the abuse that occurred during the school's operation was not revealed to the public until two decades after.

Regarding foreign relations, the General Council recognized the People's Republic of China in 1952. Though the General Council asked the federal government to do the same, Canada would not follow suit until the 1970s. The Vietnam War brought new controversies to the church when the secretary of the national Evangelism and Social Service Committee (E&SS), Ray Hord, organized sponsorships of American draft evaders in 1968. The General Council Executive initially disavowed the action, but ultimately provided a grant to E&SS to support the campaign. Relations with Canadian Jewish community reached a nadir in 1972, when A. C. Forrest, the editor of the United Church Observer, published an article titled “How Zionists Manipulate Your News". The article received criticism from individual members of the United Church and from B'nai Brith Canada.

In 1975, Anglican leadership withdrew from talks concerning union with the United Church of Canada. This put an end to a series of intermittent negotiations that began with an invitation from the Anglican Church in 1943 and led to the production of several joint publications, including the Principles of Union in 1965, a hymn book in 1971, and a Plan of Union between the Anglicans, United Church, and the Disciples of Christ in 1973. Merger with the Disciples of Christ also failed to come to fruition when their negotiations with the United Church ended in 1985. However, the Anglican, Lutheran, Presbyterian, Catholic, and United churches did agree to recognize the validity of Christian baptisms performed in any of these denominations in 1975.

The church elected its first female Moderator, Lois Wilson, in 1980. The same year also saw the commissioning of diaconal ministers as a part of ordered ministry, which allowed the diaconate to administer sacraments, as well as a report on sexual ethics titled In God's Image, which recommended the admission of homosexuals into the ministry and tolerance of premarital sex. Although the report accepted abortion under qualified circumstances, it rejected abortion on demand. In 1986, the church apologized to First Nations congregations for its role in colonization, which was acknowledged but not accepted by The All Native Circle Conference of Indigenous congregations.

The controversies of the 1980s exacerbated an already declining active membership, and the church itself became increasingly marginalized in Canada. The national leadership’s attempts to address sexuality in particular led to great internal controversy and widespread concern that the national church was “out of touch” with the people in the congregations. All of this contributed to growing financial and structural concerns within the United Church.

— Tracy J. Trothen, The United Church of Canada: A History

From the publication of In God's Image onward, the issue of ordination for gays and lesbians became a major controversy within the church. In 1988, the church chose to end investment in South Africa and elected the first Moderator of Asian descent, Sang Chul Lee. However, the issue of human sexuality dominated the 1980s; debate began when the commissioners of the General Council passed a statement called Membership, Ministry and Human Sexuality that stated "all persons, regardless of sexual orientation, who profess their faith in Jesus Christ are welcome to be or become members of The United Church of Canada" and that "all members of the United Church are eligible to be considered for ordered ministry." Taken together, these two statements opened the door for openly gay men and women to join the ministry.

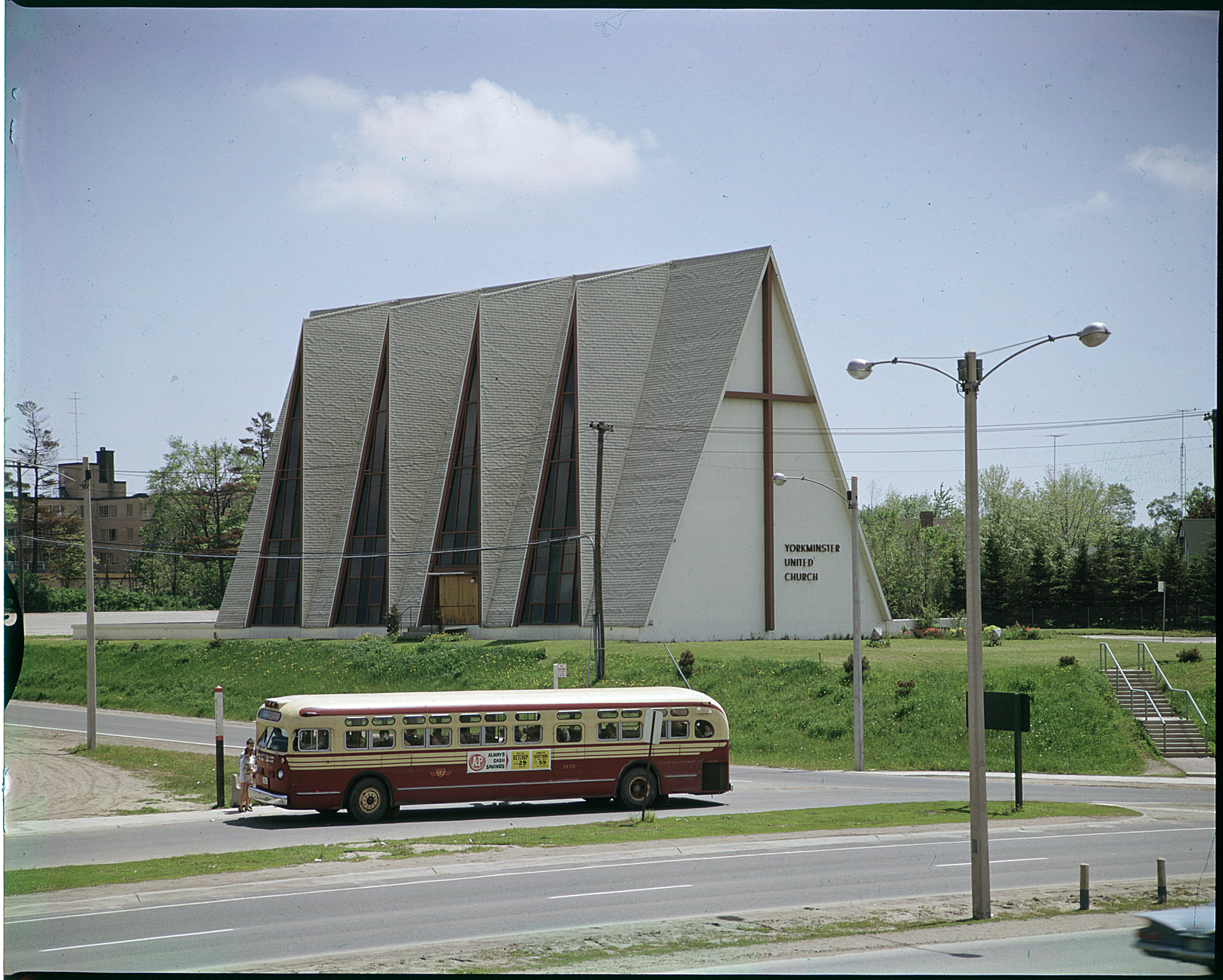
Yorkminster United Church was sold to the Salvation Army in 1984 during a string of church sales and amalgamations in Toronto.

Many members opposed this; Thomas G Bandy, the church's officer of Congregational Mission and Evangelism, reported in 1993 that the controversy "cost the church an estimated 25,000 members". These losses included split congregations and the resignation of ministers. Opposition against the General Council's decision was led by in-church conservative groups such as The Renewal Fellowship and the then newly-formed Community of Concern. Both groups saw their membership decline as dissenters opted to leave the church entirely. The United Church went on to ordain its first openly gay minister, Tim Stevenson, in 1992.

Lawsuits filed in the late 1980s by students of residential schools operated by the United Church preceded the church's formal apologies and restitution for the child abuse that occurred in its residential schools., and a 1998 apology to former students of its residential schools. In 1992, Stan McKay of the Fisher River Cree Nation became the church's first Indigenous moderator. This was followed by the establishment of a donation-led fund for Indigenous communities. These internal reckonings were accompanied by appeals from the church to the federal government regarding social issues. In 1990, the church testified against Bill C-43, a proposed law that would have banned abortion in Canada unless the woman's life or health was threatened. The bill later failed in the Senate. Beginning in 1999, the church supported the legal recognition of same-sex unions through civil unions.

Bill Phipps, elected Moderator in 1997, advocated for a "moral economy" that ran counter to capitalism. On the same year of his election, Phipps oversaw an amelioration of tensions with the Canadian Jewish community when the Bearing Faithful Witness report was sent to the General Council. Phipps echoed the report's recommendations against the conversion of Jews, and stated that “Christianity does not supersede Judaism.” Controversy again descended on the church when, soon after his election, Phipps stated in an interview that he neither believed Jesus was God nor that Jesus physically rose from the dead. Phipps later elaborated on his stance, reiterating that Jesus did not "embody all of God" while affirming that "Jesus is the son of God, the word made flesh, God Incarnate".

== 21st Century ==
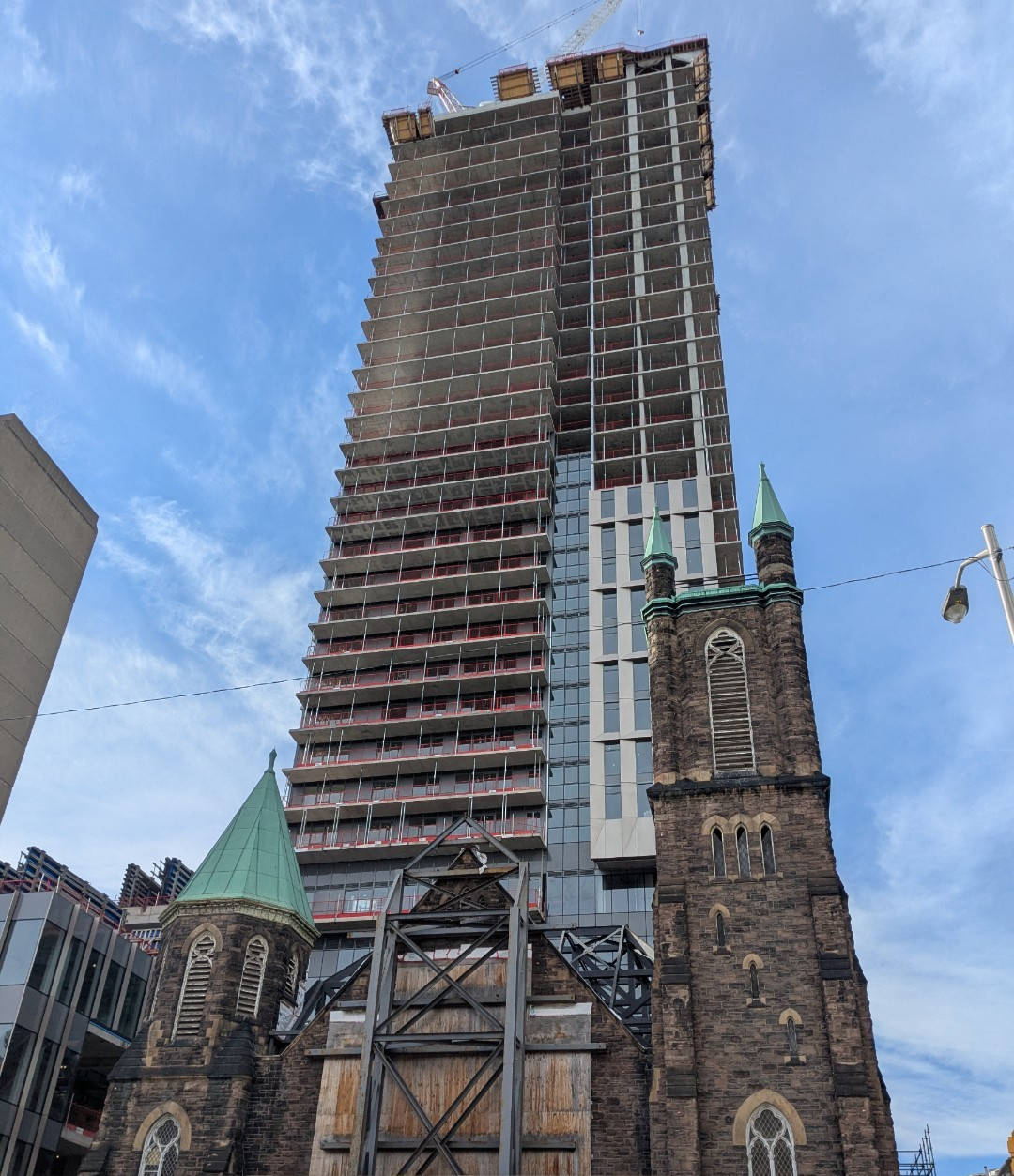
Bloor Street United Church in the process of redevelopment. A condominium tower and offices for the General Council will be built on its premises.

The church continued its social advocacy for legal recognition of same-sex couples into the 21st century; it endorsed same-sex marriage in 2003 and called upon the Canadian government to do the same. After the Civil Marriage Act passed in 2005, the church urged the government not to reopen the issue. In 2012, the 41st General Council elected Gary Paterson as the first openly gay Moderator. The same council also approved a boycott of goods from Israeli settlements in the West Bank. This was the church's first boycott since an anti-apartheid boycott against South Africa in the 1980s. According to the church report that proposed the boycott, the authors consulted with Canadian-based Palestinian organizations, as well as "Jewish rabbis, individuals and organizations" among others. Still it incited controversy, with Canadian senators who affiliated with the United Church and the Centre for Israel and Jewish Affairs protesting the decision.

In 2015, Gretta Vosper, the minister of West Hill United Church and an avowed atheist, faced dismissal from her position by church governance. Initially found to be unsuitable for ministry by the Toronto Conference in 2016, Vosper reached a settlement in 2018 that allowed her to continue as the minister of West Hill United. In response to this internal decision, the offices of the General Council released a statement saying, "This [decision] doesn't alter in any way the belief of the United Church of Canada in God, a God most fully revealed to us as Christians in and through Jesus Christ. Our church's statements of faith over the years have all been grounded in this understanding." A survey of 1,353 "United Church ministry personnel" published by the Vancouver Sun found that "a majority of the respondents (almost 95%) affirmed a belief in God, with a large number (almost 80%) affirming a belief in a supernatural, theistic God".

Several reforms were proposed at the 42nd General Council in 2015, including a reorganization from a four-court structure to a three-council structure and the elimination of "settlement", the practice of telling newly ordained ministers where they would first serve. These changes were subsequently approved by the wider church, and ratified at the 43rd General Council in July 2018.

During the early 21st century, the United Church experienced a significant decline in membership: from 640,000 in 2001 to 350,000 in 2021. In 2006, the church organized the "Emerging Spirit" outreach program for 30- to 40-year-olds, which included an advertising campaign and an online chat room. In the face of decreasing attendance, the General Council reduced its number of staff and the size of its grant program in 2013. Dwindling funds and congregations has led to church land, such as Deer Park United Church in Toronto and Sackville United Church in New Brunswick, being sold to property developers.

With the stated intent of "[keeping] real estate in the United Church" by constructing affordable homes on church land, the church formed the United Property Resource Corporation (UPRC) in 2020. Beginning in 2022, the church has funded Kindred Works, a for-profit company that is majority-owned by the church, to redevelop unused church land and existing buildings into rental properties. As the asset manager for UPRC, Kindred Works has received loans from the United Church and the Canada Mortgage and Housing Corporation. Most of Kindred Works' projects, such as St Luke's United Church, are located in Ontario and are designed by KPMB Architects. As of 2026, the church has completed 131 homes towards its aim of 5,000.
