= Marion Pardy =

The Very Reverend Marion Pardy
- 37th Moderator of the United Church of Canada
- Church: United Church of Canada
- Elected: August 2000
- Term ended: August 16, 2003
- Predecessor: Bill Phipps
- Successor: Peter Short

Orders
- Ordination: 1969

Personal details
- Born: May 9, 1942 (age 84) Gander, Newfoundland and Labrador
- Education: York University, Boston University School of Theology

Marion Pardy (born May 9, 1942), a diaconal minister and author, was the 37th Moderator of the United Church of Canada from 2000 to 2003.

== Early life ==
Pardy was born in Gander, Newfoundland. In 1961, at age 19, she moved to Belleville, Ontario to work at Albert College, as well as to complete entrance requirements at night school for Covenant College in Winnipeg (now the Centre for Christian Studies).

== Vocation ==
In 1968 she was designated as a deaconess at Gower Street United Church in St. John's Newfoundland, and ordained as a diaconal minister.

Pardy pursued and received Bachelor of Arts and Master of Arts degrees from York University in Toronto. Her MA thesis, "Models of Biblical Authority", was published in 1988 by Harper and Row Publishers as Teaching Children the Bible. She received her Doctor of Ministry degree from Boston University School of Theology in 1997. For her thesis, Biblical Understanding in the Local Congregation, she examined how to narrow the gap between theological education and biblical education in the congregation.

== Moderator ==
In 2000, Pardy was nominated to be Moderator, and in August of that year, she was elected for a three-year term at the 37th General Council, becoming the first diaconal minister to become Moderator. Asked about the challenges facing the United Church, Pardy responded, "We live in a changing church and in a changing world. Our challenge is to seek God in the midst of change, to be daring enough to implement and critique change, knowing that we will make mistakes but also recognizing that 'stagnation unto death' is worse."

== After her term as moderator ==
Following her term as Moderator, she represented the United Church on the Governing Board of the Canadian Council of Churches, where she served as Vice-President from 2004 until she stepped down in 2009.

In 2013, the Premier of Newfoundland and Labrador awarded Pardy a Queen’s Jubilee Medal in recognition of her contributions to the community.

Religious titles
Preceded by Bill Phipps	Moderator of the United Church of Canada; 2000–2003	Succeeded by Peter Short
