= Peter Short (clergyman) =

Moderator of the United Church of Canada (born 1948)

The Very Reverend Peter B. Short
- 38th Moderator of the United Church of Canada
- Installed: August 16, 2003
- Term ended: August 19, 2006
- Predecessor: Marion Pardy
- Successor: David Giuliano

Orders
- Ordination: 1969

Personal details
- Born: July 22, 1948 (age 78) Kingston, Ontario
- Residence: Fredericton, New Brunswick
- Education: Emmanuel College, Toronto

Peter B. Short (born July 22, 1948) is an ordained minister and was the 38th Moderator of the United Church of Canada from 2003 until 2006. He was elected Moderator at the denomination's meeting of the 38th General Council in Wolfville, Nova Scotia.

== Early life and career ==
Short was born in Kingston, Ontario and grew up in Arnprior and Braeside, Ontario. In 1978, he graduated from Emmanuel College, and was ordained by the Maritime Conference of the United Church of Canada. He subsequently served as minister to a number of congregations in eastern and northern Canada.

Short was elected as Moderator at the 38th General Council of the United Church in August 2003. Shortly after his election, he said, "Our identity as The United Church of Canada is not in our denomination, and has never been in our denomination. Our identity is in following Jesus Christ and crossing boundaries that divide people, that alienate people and that condemn people, until we stand on common ground and there is a place at the table for all." As Moderator he strove to "turn on the lights of our mission work, the critical work for justice, peace and reconciliation".

Following the passage of same-sex marriage legislation by the Canadian federal government in June 2005, Short noted in a pastoral letter to all congregations of the United Church that the topic was deeply divisive. But he urged church members to not simply be for or against the issue. "This would be a bad time to be carried off by the songs of victory or by the laments of resentment. Beneath the louder music of public ideologies there is a gospel invitation that is being sounded, an invitation to a great banquet. And 'blessed is anyone who will eat bread in the Kingdom of God.'"

== Personal ==
Short is married to Susan Crawford. They have four children.

Religious titles
Preceded by Marion Pardy	Moderator of the United Church of Canada; 2003–2006	Succeeded by David Giuliano
