= Bill Phipps =

Canadian politician (1942–2022)

The Very Reverend Bill Phipps
- 36th Moderator of the United Church of Canada
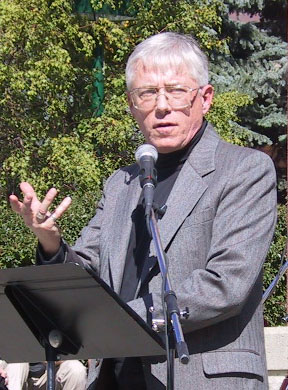
- Phipps speaking at an interfaith prayer vigil in 2001
- Church: United Church of Canada
- Elected: August 1997
- Predecessor: Marion Best
- Successor: Marion Pardy

Orders
- Ordination: 1969

Personal details
- Born: May 4, 1942 Toronto, Ontario, Canada
- Died: March 4, 2022 (aged 79) Calgary, Alberta, Canada
- Education: McCormick Theological Seminary
- Political party: New Democratic Party

William Frederick Allen Phipps (May 4, 1942 – March 4, 2022) was a Canadian ordained minister of the United Church of Canada, lawyer and social activist. He served as the 36th Moderator of the United Church of Canada from 1997 to 2000, and engendered controversy for expressing support for gay ordination and not believing in a physical Resurrection of Jesus.

== Early life and ministry ==
Phipps was born in Toronto, the son of Cora Stinson and Reginald Phipps. He graduated from Osgoode Law School in 1965, but felt a call to ministry rather than the law, and enrolled at McCormick Theological Seminary in Chicago. During his studies, he worked with community activist Saul Alinsky, and marched with Martin Luther King. After graduation in 1968, Phipps moved to Toronto to article for his law degree and opened the first Poverty law office in Canada. He was ordained by the United Church of Canada in 1969, and became the minister first of Thorncliffe United Church, and then Trinity-St. Paul's United Church. During his time in Toronto, he advocated for LGBTQ rights, the poor, and homelessness.

In 1986, he moved to Edmonton, Alberta to work in church administration for seven years. In 1993, he moved to Calgary to become the minister of Scarboro United Church.

== Moderator of the United Church of Canada ==
=== Controversy ===
Phipps was elected to the post of Moderator at the 36th General Council of the United Church in August 1997. Shortly after being installed, Phipps was interviewed by many journalists and newspapers, including the editorial board of the Ottawa Citizen. The subsequent editorial published by the Citizen, which criticized his views on the ordination of gays, economic justice for the poor, and especially his theological views, ignited nation-wide controversy, During the interview, Phipps had questioned the Resurrection of Jesus as a scientific fact, added he was undecided on the question of the afterlife, and "I don't believe Jesus was God." Although several contemporary theologians and scholars were surprised by the fierce backlash, saying that Phipps' theological views were not considered radical, the controversy resulted in discussions and debates in United Church congregations across the country. As the Globe & Mail noted in his obituary, "Some called him saint; others, a heretic." In an interview with Maclean's, Phipps further explained his views on the Resurrection of Jesus, saying, "There’s no question that Jesus’ followers [...] believed with all their being that Jesus was alive and with them and energizing them to carry forward his ministry. Something very real happened to those people and it has been giving power to the Christian community ever since. But the body that he was crucified with — dying and coming back and walking around the earth and then ascending into heaven in a three-storey universe — that doesn’t make sense. If I have to put it in those terms, it loses its power because it’s not credible to me."

Four months after the controversy started, the United Church's General Council executive issued a statement of support for Phipps.

=== Apology for residential schools ===
In October 1998, speaking on behalf of the United Church, Phipps apologized on behalf of the United Church to Canada's indigenous First Nations for abuse in church-run residential schools earlier in the century, saying in part, "To those individuals who were physically, sexually, and mentally abused as students of the Indian Residential Schools in which The United Church of Canada was involved, I offer you our most sincere apology. You did nothing wrong. You were and are the victims of evil acts that cannot under any circumstances be justified or excused."

=== Other initiatives ===
Phipps travelled across Canada to speak to people in an initiative called "Faith and the Economy". He also co-authored Bearing Faithful Witness: United Church–Jewish Relations Today with Rev. Clint Mooney, about the church's relationship with Judaism.

== Later life and death ==
Following his time as moderator, Phipps returned to ministry at Scarboro United in Calgary. In 2000, he co-founded Faith and the Common Good with Rev. Ted Reeve, an interfaith group dedicated to working together on projects for the common good. Their main initiative became known as "Greening Sacred Spaces."

Phipps continued to be a community organizer, hospital chaplain and adult educator.

In 2002, Phipps was the New Democratic Party candidate in the Calgary Southwest by-election contested by newly elected Canadian Alliance leader Stephen Harper. Phipps challenged Harper's conservative economic and social views. During the campaign, Harper commented that he "despise[d]" Phipps, and declined to participate in debates with him. In the election, Phipps came in second with just over 20 per cent of the vote.

In 2005, Phipps was awarded the Alberta Centennial Medal.

Phipps retired from ministry in 2007, but stayed actively involved with community projects. He died on March 4, 2022, at the age of 79.

=== Electoral record ===
Canadian federal by-election, May 13, 2002: Calgary Southwest Resignation of Preston Manning
Party	Candidate	Votes	%	±%	Expenditures
Alliance	Stephen Harper	13,200	71.66	+6.84	$58,959.16
New Democratic	Bill Phipps	3,813	20.70	+16.73	$34,789.77
Green	James Stephen Kohut	660	3.58	–	$2,750.80
Independent	Gordon Barrett	428	2.32	–	$3,329.34
Christian Heritage	Ron Gray	320	1.74	–	$27,772.78
Total valid votes		18,421	99.47		
Total rejected ballots		98	0.53	+0.23	
Turnout		18,519	23.05	–39.88	
Eligible voters		80,360			
Alliance hold		Swing		–4.94	
Source: Elections Canada

Religious titles
Preceded by Marion Best	Moderator of the United Church of Canada; 1997–2000	Succeeded by Marion Pardy
