= David Giuliano =

Canadian church minister (born 1960)

David W. Giuliano

39th Moderator of the United Church of Canada
- In office August 19, 2006 – August 15, 2009
- Preceded by: Peter Short
- Succeeded by: Mardi Tindal

Personal details
- Born: May 16, 1960 (age 66) Hamilton, Ontario
- Spouse: Pearl Giuliano
- Children: Jeremiah Ryall and Naomi Pearl
- Education: University of Guelph, Queen's Theological College
- Profession: Minister, Author
- Website: davidgiuliano.ca

David W. Giuliano (born May 16, 1960) was the 39th Moderator of the United Church of Canada from 2006 to 2009.

== Early life and education ==
Giuliano grew up in Windsor, Ontario, in his words, "a descendant of deeply faithful Southern Ontario Quakers, born-again Baptists, and Italian-American immigrant Catholics." While in attending high school in Windsor, Ontario, he met his future wife Pearl at a church youth group.

Giuliano earned a Bachelor of Arts and a Master's of Science from the University of Guelph and a Master of Divinity and a Master of Theology from Queen's University. He received an Honorary Doctorate from Huntington University, Sudbury.

== Vocation ==
Following graduation, Giuliano moved to Marathon, Ontario to serve at St. John's United Church. He also worked for the University of Guelph as human rights commissioner, conference co-ordinator, and residence manager. In 1980, he and his wife spent four months volunteering at a vocational school in Cap Haïtien, Haiti.

He is active in community development, and was the founding chairperson of several groups, including a regional restorative justice program, a food bank and thrift store co-operative, a school community council, and an anti-racism committee. He also co-chaired the municipal community development committee.

== Moderator ==
In 2006, Giuliano was nominated as a candidate for the post of Moderator. In August of that year at the 39th General Council of the United Church at Lakehead University in Thunder Bay, Ontario, he was elected as the Moderator for a three-year term.

During his tenure as moderator, Giuliano tried to prepare the United Church for a new vision of its mission in Canada's post-Christian society, saying "Don't be afraid" and that concerns about falling attendance and revenue should not stand in the way of change, for "God is getting ready to do something new and is inviting us to be part of that."

Shortly after his election as moderator, Giuliano discovered that a cancer he had fought into remission several years previously had recurred. While recovering from surgery and during other treatment, Giuliano shared his journey of faith, hope and discovery with the wider church through letters, articles and videos. In the December 2008 issue of The United Church Observer, he wrote:

If we played the [Christmas] pageant together, who would you be this year? ...

This year I would be the donkey, I suppose. I would be a donkey who used to be a warrior horse. The ravages of failure, age and illness, though, have transformed me into something more humble and comical — and I say that with no disrespect toward donkeys. It feels as though maybe I am only beginning to understand what it means to carry the promised Christ on my back. Only just beginning to understand this remarkable journey, but even in my stubborn single-mindedness I have been invited to a place of honour on the journey.

Giuliano was succeeded by Mardi Tindal in August 2009 at the 40th General Council.

== Author ==
Giuliano is the author of more than 90 articles, essays, and poems, including Postcards from the Valley: Encounters with Fear, Faith and God, a Canadian best seller, and It's Good to Be Here: stories we tell about cancer. He has also published two illustrated children's books: The Alligator in Naomi’s Pillow and Jeremiah and the Letter e. The Undertaking of Billy Buffone, was published by Latitude 46 in April, 2021. The Upending of Wendall Forbes was published by Latitude 46 in September, 2025.

== Personal ==
In addition to the Bachelor of Arts and Master of Divinity degrees earned before his ordination, Giuliano also has a Master of Theology, a Master of Science in Adult and Experiential Learning, a certificate in Spiritual Direction, and a certificate in Expressive Arts. In 2007, he received an honorary Doctorate of Divinity from Huntington University.

He and his wife Pearl have two children, Jeremiah Ryall and Naomi Pearl.

Guiliano retired from active ministry in 2017, and continues to live in Marathon and write.

Religious titles
Preceded by Peter Short	Moderator of the United Church of Canada; 2006–2009	Succeeded by Mardi Tindal
