= Homosexuality and the United Church of Canada =

Although the United Church of Canada is one of the few mainstream Christian denominations to both ordain LGBTQ clergy and consecrate same-sex marriages, support for these issues have caused deep divisions within the church.

== LGBTQ clergy ==
At the time of its inception in 1925, the United Church of Canada considered homosexuality a sin, and openly LGBTQ persons were rejected as candidates for ministry. By the 1970s, attitudes had changed, and as early as 1977, the United Church urged Canada's Parliament to amend human rights laws to protect gay men and lesbians against discrimination.

Although openly gay candidates were still rejected for ministry, that began to change on August 17, 1980, when a United Church of Canada task force released In God's Image... Male and Female, its report on sexual ethics, which stated "there is no reason in principle why mature, self-accepting homosexuals, any more than mature, self-accepting heterosexuals, should not be ordained or commissioned." That same year, however, an openly lesbian candidate's application for ordination was rejected.

In 1988, a task force released Gift, Dilemma, and Promise: A Report and Affirmations of Human Sexuality that stated that all human beings, regardless of sexual orientation, are persons made in the image of God, and recommended that the church welcome sexually active gay men, lesbians, and bisexuals into all aspects of the Church, including the ministry.

A poll taken within the church revealed that only 28% of members supported this concept, and conservative factions vowed to defeat the proposal that would be tabled at the 32nd General Council later that year. However, the General Council commissioners, by a 3-to-1 majority, endorsed a statement called Membership, Ministry and Human Sexuality that stated "all persons, regardless of sexual orientation, who profess their faith in Jesus Christ are welcome to be or become members of The United Church of Canada" and that "all members of the United Church are eligible to be considered for ordered ministry." Taken together, these two statements opened the door for openly gay men and women to join the ministry.

Many conservative church members were vehemently opposed this, and over the next four years, membership fell by 78,184. In some cases, congregations split, with a sizeable faction — sometimes led by the minister — leaving to form an independent church. In some cases, entire congregations elected to leave the church, some of these joining other Protestant denominations like the re-constituted Congregational Christian Churches in Canada or the Presbyterian Church in Canada.

In 1992, Tim Stevenson became the first openly gay man to be ordained as a minister by the United Church.

In 2012, the church elected Gary Paterson (the husband of Tim Stevenson) as its Moderator, the first openly gay man elected to lead the church, and the first openly gay leader of a major Christian denomination in Canada.

== Same-sex marriage ==
In 1992, although same-sex marriages did not exist in Canada, the 34th General Council called for liturgical and pastoral resources for same-sex covenants be made available to congregations. In 1999, representatives of the Church appeared before Parliament's Standing Committee on Justice and Human Rights to speak in favour of a bill extending survivor pension rights to same-sex couples on the same basis as those in heterosexual relationships. In 2000, the 37th General Council resolved to support the civil recognition of same-sex partnerships. In 2003, at the 37th General Council, commissioners affirmed that "human sexual orientations, whether heterosexual or homosexual, are a gift from God and part of the marvellous diversity of creation." When later that year, courts in Ontario and British Columbia ruled in favour of same-sex marriage, church leadership called upon the government of Canada to extend these rulings across the country. Representatives of the church appeared before the Justice Committee considering a bill to authorize same-sex marriages. Moderator Peter Short editorialized in national newspapers and wrote to Members of Parliament on behalf of the church.

Coming seventeen years after the divisions caused by the issue of gay ordination, the same-sex marriage issue again divided liberal congregations willing to consecrate same-sex weddings from those that did not. This caused some more members to step away from the United Church.

Although there are many United Church congregations that now allow same-sex marriages to take place within their sanctuaries, there are many that do not. Nonetheless, the schisms that divided the church appear to be healing as acceptance of gay ordination and same-sex marriage become more widespread. Conservative factions such as the United Church Renewal Fellowship (UCRF) and the National Alliance of Covenanting Congregations have seen their membership decline since 2000, with the latter now only claiming 75 of the United Church's more than 2000 congregations as members.
