= Gretta Vosper =

Minister of the United Church of Canada

The Reverend Gretta Vosper
- Born: Margaret Ann Vosper; 6 July 1958 (age 68); Kingston, Ontario, Canada
- Education: Mount Allison University; Queen's University (MDiv)
- Spouses: Bill Ferguson (div. 1986) Michael Kooiman (m. 1990, divorced); Richard Scott Kearns (m. 2004)
- Children: 2

Ecclesiastical career
- Church: United Church of Canada
- Congregations: United Church in Kingston; St. Matthew's United Church; West Hill United Church
- Website: grettavosper.ca

Margaret Ann "Gretta" Vosper (born 1958) is an ordained minister of the United Church of Canada who is a self-professed atheist. Her beliefs have caused controversy both within and outside of the United Church. In 2016, following the Charlie Hebdo shooting in Paris, her public statement that the belief in a supernatural God promoted hatred led the United Church of Canada to institute an official review of her suitability as a minister. In 2018, that process was discontinued when Vosper and the United Church reached an agreement that left her free to continue as a minister. Her published works include With or Without God: Why The Way We Live is More Important Than What We Believe and Amen: What Prayer Can Mean in a World Beyond Belief.

== Early life and education ==
Vosper was born in Kingston, Ontario, the second of four children. As a child, she attended the local United Church but claims that she never strongly believed in the existence of God, although she says her parents sometimes overheard her talking to Jesus, and she once told them that Jesus helped her learn to skate. Of her teen years, she said, "I was wild. I lied to my parents. I drove a car at 13; I drank underage."

At age 17, she left high school a year early and enrolled at Mount Allison University to study literature, psychology and religion. After earning her bachelor's degree, she briefly considered studying for ministry, but instead moved to the Northwest Territories, where she met and married Bill Ferguson, and had a daughter Hazel. They moved to Winnipeg, and divorced in 1986.

As a single mother, she moved back to Kingston, where she enrolled in Queen's Theological College as a candidate for ministry, and changed her name to Gretta.

In 1990, she earned her Master of Divinity, and she married a fellow student, Michael Kooiman. Their son Izaak was born in 1991.

== Ministry ==
Vosper worked for two years as a junior minister at United Church in Kingston before she and Kooiman moved to Toronto in 1993 as team ministers at St. Matthew's United Church.

In 1997, Vosper became the minister of West Hill United Church in Toronto. Over the next few years, she became increasingly aware that her views on God were changing, and she was becoming uncomfortable using traditional United Church liturgy. Her marriage to Kooiman ended as their theological views diverged.

In 2001, she told her congregation that she was a non-theist – although she believed in God as a concept, she no longer believed in God as a supernatural being who intervened in the affairs of humanity. Although she expected to be fired, the United Church instead settled with her. Regular attendance in her congregation declined from 150 to 40, especially after the Lord's Prayer was removed from the liturgy in 2003.

During her "non-theist" phase, Vosper was supported by leaders of the United Church. In 2011, Mardi Tindal, at the time United Church moderator, told a Toronto newspaper, "I celebrate Gretta and others like her who cause us to think more deeply about the nature of our faith. What Gretta has done has ignited a fresh conversation and invigorated the discussion."

In 2004, Vosper married Scott Kearns, the music director at her church.

== Atheism ==
In 2013, Vosper's beliefs shifted to atheism after she read about the plight of Bangladeshi bloggers who faced imprisonment and execution as blasphemers for questioning the existence of God. Although many inside and outside the wider church questioned how an avowed atheist could still be a minister, the United Church leadership still abstained from taking action.

In 2015, following the Charlie Hebdo shooting in Paris, the United Church published a prayer for those who had been killed. In response, Vosper wrote an open letter to Gary Paterson, then moderator of the United Church, arguing that the use of religious language in the prayer, namely the belief in a supernatural God, only reinforced the beliefs that had motivated the killings.

The United Church's Toronto Conference reacted in September 2016 by instituting a review of her ministry, stating that her atheism made her "not suitable to continue in ordained ministry". The matter was then referred to the church's General Council, initiating an ecclesiastical court hearing that might have led to Vosper being defrocked. Despite the controversy, much of her congregation remained staunchly supportive, and the publicity caused attendance to rise again.

In an interview on CBC's The National, Vosper estimated "it would be at least upwards of 50% of the clergy in the United Church who don't believe in a theistic, supernatural, God". A subsequent survey of 1,353 "United Church ministry personnel" by Richard Bott found that "a majority of the respondents (almost 95%) affirmed a belief in God, with a large number (almost 80%) affirming a belief in a supernatural, theistic God".

In November 2018, before the hearing could take place, Vosper and the United Church reached a settlement that allowed her to continue the work in her ministry, effectively ending the matter. Her lawyer, Julian Falconer, offered this comment: "Both parties took a long look at the cost-benefit at running a heresy trial and whether it was good for anyone (and) the results speak for themselves. They recognized there's a place for Gretta, and that there is no reason to separate the minister and the congregation." The United Church issued a statement that the settlement with Vosper "doesn't alter in any way the belief of The United Church of Canada in God, a God most fully revealed to us as Christians in and through Jesus Christ".

== Selected publications ==
- With or Without God: Why the Way We Live is More Important Than What We Believe. Canada: HarperCollins. 2008. ISBN 978-1-55468-400-7.
- Amen: What Prayer Can Mean in a World Beyond Belief. Canada: HarperCollins. 2012. ISBN 978-1-55468-647-6.
- Holy Breath: Prayers for Worship and Reflection. Toronto, Ontario, Canada: File 14. 1986. ISBN 0-9737752-0-3.
- Another Breath. Toronto, Ontario, Canada: File 14. 2009. ISBN 978-0-9737752-1-1.
- We All Breathe. Toronto, Ontario, Canada: File 14. 2012. ISBN 978-0-9737752-3-5.
