= Mardi Tindal =

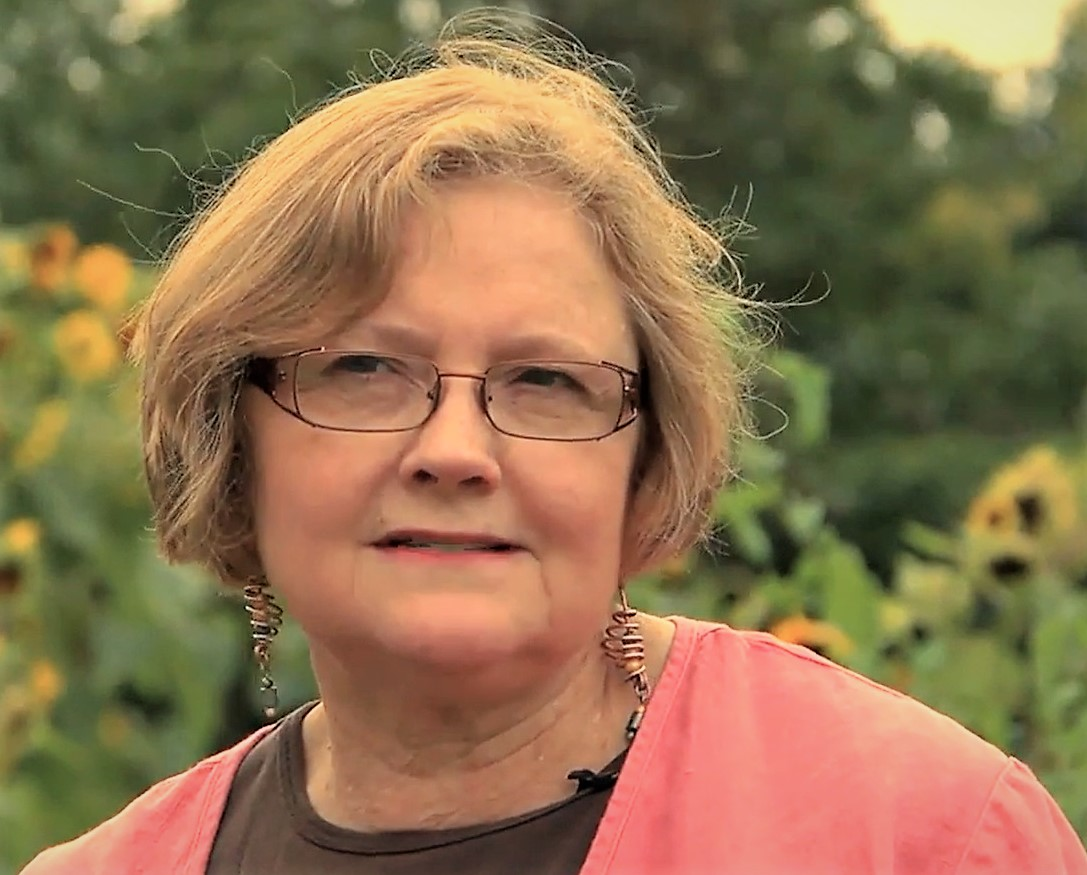
- Tindal in a UCC video in 2020

40th Moderator of the United Church of Canada
- In office August 15, 2009 – August 18, 2012
- Preceded by: David Giuliano
- Succeeded by: Gary Paterson

Personal details
- Born: 1952 (age 73–74)
- Spouse: Doug Tindal
- Education: University of Toronto

Mardi Tindal (born 1952) was the 40th Moderator of the United Church of Canada from 2009–2012, only the fourth layperson to take the post since the church was formed in 1925.

== Early life and vocation ==
Tindal was raised in the rural village of Victoria Square, Ontario, and earned an MA in psychology from the University of Toronto. Before her election, Tindal was already well known within the United Church of Canada as the co-host of a United Church television program, Spirit Connection. She was also an adult educator, author, video producer, led pilgrimages to Iona (Scotland), was involved in continuing education in Jamaica, and just prior to her election, was Executive Director of Five Oaks Centre, one of the United Church's education centres.

== Moderator ==
Timdal was nominated to be Moderator in 2009, and at the 40th General Council of the church, she was elected to the position after five ballots on August 14, 2009. She was installed as the 40th Moderator the next day, only the fourth layperson to be elected to the position since the United Church's inception in 1925.

In her remarks to the Council following her election, Tindal spoke of entering into a covenant with the church "as we live into ministry together." Meeting with reporters afterwards, her first wish was to support the church in its desire to live in covenant relationship with God and with each other in a caring stewardship of Creation. "I am committed to encouraging young leaders... I am deeply committed to [a] right relationship with creation, in and beyond our faith community... I will be inviting the church to imagine new ways of caring for creation ... We are called to portray the integrity of creation." Speaking about the United Church's current struggles with declining membership and depleted financial resources, Tindal said, "What's most important is to discern what's faithful, set a course, trust in God's abundance, and invite people into it."

== Personal ==
Tindal currently lives in Toronto, Ontario with her husband. She has two children, Chris, a candidate in the 2010 Toronto municipal election, and Alex, a comedy writer and performer.

== Footnotes ==
Religious titles
Preceded by David Giuliano	Moderator of the United Church of Canada; 2009–2012	Succeeded by Gary Paterson
