= Lydia Emelie Gruchy =

French-born Canadian Protestant minister

- Gruchy in 1937
- Born: September 5, 1894; Asnières-sur-Seine, Paris, France
- Died: April 9, 1992 (aged 97); White Rock, British Columbia, Canada
- Other names: Lydia Émelie de Gruchy
- Occupation: Church minister
- Known for: First ordained woman of the United Church of Canada

Lydia Emelie Gruchy (September 5, 1894 – April 9, 1992) was a French-born Canadian who became the first woman ordained to the ministry of the United Church of Canada. She was the first woman to enroll in theological studies, to graduate from a Presbyterian theological college and also the first woman to be granted an honorary Doctor of Divinity degree in Canada.

== Early life ==
Lydia Emelie Gruchy was born on 5 September 1894 in Asnières-sur-Seine, Paris, France to Mary Ann (née Hicks) and Charles Herbert de Gruchy from the Island of Jersey, in the Channel Islands. She grew up in France and England, and in 1913, immigrated with her family to Strasbourg, Saskatchewan.

== Career ==
She began teaching in schools around Strasbourg and attended Nutana Collegiate, which at the time housed the Saskatoon Normal School, earning her teaching certificate. She soon followed a brother to the University of Saskatchewan and graduated with honors in 1920 with her bachelor's degree. With the encouragement of the principal, Edmund Oliver, Gruchy entered the Presbyterian Theological College in Saskatoon, becoming the first woman to enroll as a theological student and graduated with honors in 1923. Upon graduation, she became the first woman to have graduated from a Canadian Presbyterian theological college. She applied to be ordained by the Presbyterian Church in Canada and was rejected. In 1925, with the merger of the Methodists and Congregational churches of Canada, she applied for ordination with them and was denied.

Gruchy began her work at the Veregin Church near Kamsack. She preached, taught religious education, and conducted all services except administering communion. She also served as pastor at Wakaw and later at Kelvington. Every two years, her presbytery sought approval from the General Council for her ordination and for thirteen years their pleas were denied. Arguments against her ordination ranged from she was not representative of other women because she was the only one requesting ordination, proving that women did not want to be ordained; ordination would discriminate against married women who could not properly fulfill their duties to their spouses and children and simultaneously pastor; ordination would cause women to lose their "womanliness"; and that ordaining women would undermine the ability to attract male clergy. Finally, in 1934, the Saskatchewan Council, rather than asking the General Council to approve, made it clear that they were going to ordain Gruchy unless there were objections. When put to a vote, the General Council easily passed the sole question, "Do you approve of the ordination of women?" On 4 November 1936, Lydia Emelie Gruchy was ordained at St. Andrew's United Church of Moose Jaw, becoming the first female ordained minister of the United Church of Canada.

Immediately following her ordination, she became the assistant minister at the church where she was ordained and then in 1939, she was relocated to Toronto and appointed as the Secretary for the Deaconess Order and Women Workers of the United Church. Then in 1940, she also began serving as the acting principal of the Deaconess Training School. Gruchy returned to ministering in 1943 serving at small churches throughout Saskatchewan for the next twenty years. In 1953, she was awarded an honorary Doctor of Divinity degree from her alma mater, which was then called St. Andrew’s Theological College and a part of the University of Saskatchewan. When the degree was bestowed, she became the first woman in Canada to be so honored. She retired in 1962 and relocated to White Rock, British Columbia.

Gruchy died on April 9, 1992, at White Rock.
