= Centre for Christian Studies =

Protestant theological school in Winnipeg, Manitoba

Coordinates: 49°52′50.16″N 97°9′40.86″W

- Type: Theological school
- Established: 1969
- Affiliations: Anglican Church of Canada; United Church of Canada
- Principal: Marcie Gibson (interim)
- Students: 60
- Location: Winnipeg, Manitoba, Canada
- Campus: Urban
- Language: English
- Website: ccsonline.ca

The Centre for Christian Studies is a Canadian Protestant theological school in Winnipeg, Manitoba, that is affiliated with the Anglican and United churches of Canada. It is a training centre for those becoming deacons and diaconal ministers; it provides continuing education for ministers and offers a variety of programs and workshops for others seeking to deepen their faith or explore theology. The centre's primary areas of study include pastoral care, social justice, collaborative learning, transformative education, and social ministry.

== History ==
The Centre for Christian Studies is historically rooted in the diaconal training schools of the Methodist, Presbyterian, and Anglican churches established in Canada in the late nineteenth century. The Social Gospel movement combined with the influence of early feminism, which was fighting for more vocational opportunities for women, as well as the increasing need of churches to fill overseas missionary sites were the major impetuses for the formation of these schools. In 1893, the Methodist National Training Centre was opened and the Presbyterian Missionary and Deaconess Training Home followed in 1897.
