= Sackville United Church =

Church in Sackville, New Brunswick, Canada

Coordinates: 45.8983°N 64.3683°W

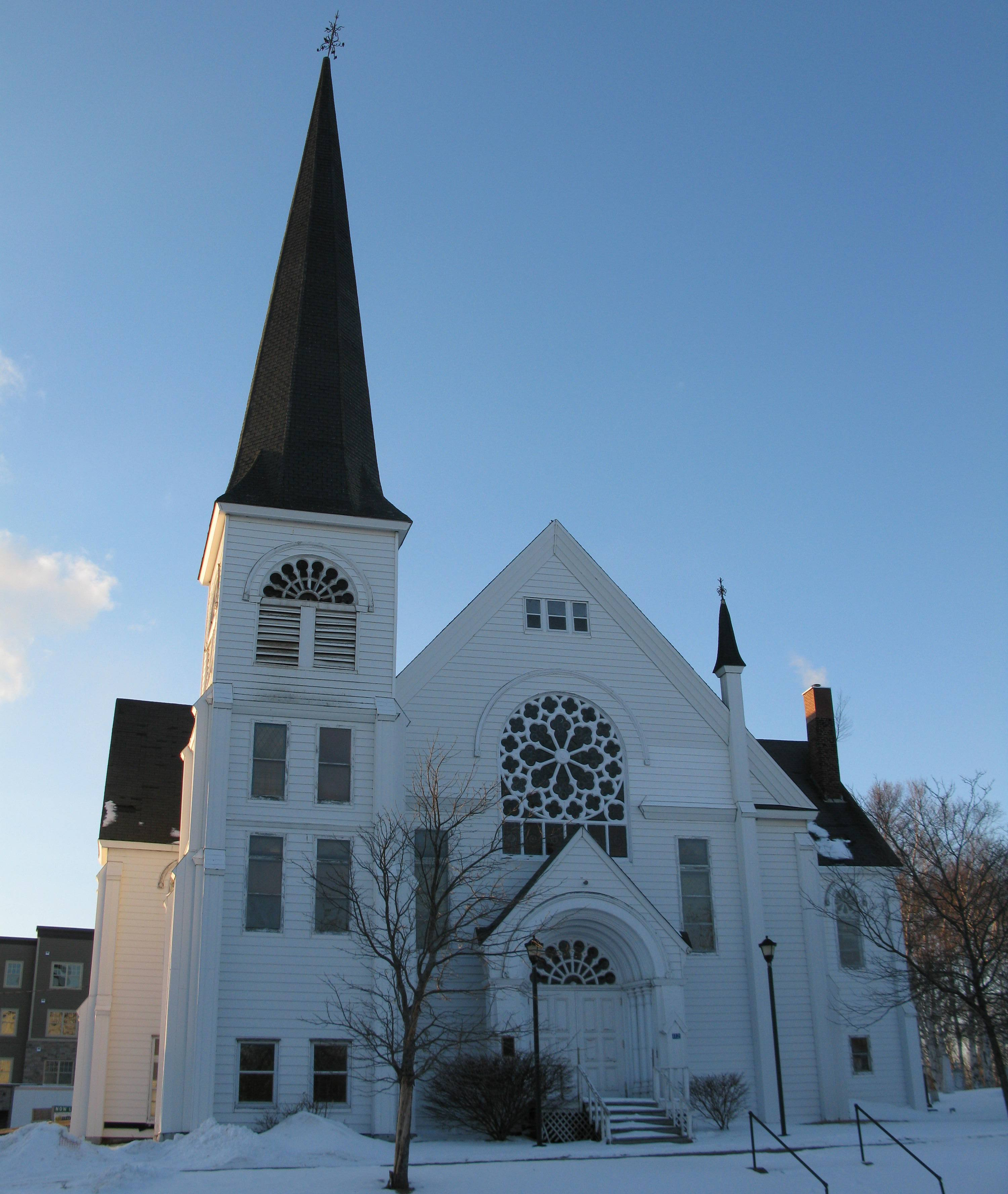
The now-demolished Sackville United Church

Sackville United Church was a 140-year-old historic landmark in the heart of Sackville, New Brunswick, Canada. The church was demolished in September 2015 following years of community debate about its future. Prior to its demolition, the church had been placed on the National Trust for Canada’s top 10 endangered places list for 2015.

== History ==
The church, built in 1875, was expanded in 1898 in the shape of a Greek cross designed by the noted architect H.H. Mott. Four-metre stained glass “rose” windows, created by J.C. Spence & Sons, adorned the four points of the cross. The church also featured a spire that rose 40 metres, a cast-iron bell weighing more than 500 kilograms, two large transepts, two balconies and a massive, 1928 organ built by Casavant Frères of Saint-Hyacinthe, Quebec with a total of 1,769 pipes. The building was an example of the Gothic Revival style which the town of Sackville describes in its guide to heritage architecture as a 19th-century "picturesque style characterized by applied delicate ornament."

The town installed a plaque in 1999 recognizing the Sackville United Church as a place where many generations of Methodists had worshipped after settlers from Yorkshire brought their religion to the area in the 1770s. The church became known as Sackville United Church in 1925 when the Methodists joined with other Protestant denominations to form the United Church of Canada. Historically, the church also had a close connection with nearby Mount Allison University, which was founded in the 1840s as a Wesleyan academy for boys by the local merchant Charles Frederick Allison after his conversion to Methodism. Allison's body lies in the church cemetery. Generations of Mount Allison students attended the church until the university established its own chapel in the mid 1960s.

== Sale and demolition ==
Amid dwindling attendance and $350,000 in repairs necessary, the congregation voted more than 70% in favour of selling the property and building and moving to a smaller adjacent building that previously housed town hall.

The property and building were subsequently purchased by local developer J.N. Lafford Realty Inc., who was willing to sell the building for $1, on the condition that it be removed from the property. A local group of citizens named Sackville People Leading Action to Save Heritage (SPLASH) sought to save the building, offering to purchase the building back from the local developer, and proposed that it be converted into a community centre. After no deal could be made, the Sackville Heritage Board voted four-to-one to approve a demolition permit, but allowed some historically significant elements of the church to be preserved and reused elsewhere. The church was subsequently added to the National Trust for Canada’s top 10 endangered places list for 2015, and SPLASH unsuccessfully appealed the demolition permit to the provincial government’s Assessment and Planning Appeal Board.

Subsequently, the church’s pipe organ, some floor boards, and small stained glass windows were removed, and the church was demolished in September 2015. The larger stained glass windows were demolished with the church, as they could not be safely be removed prior to. The church’s pipe organ was subsequently relocated to St. Paul of the Cross Catholic Church in Park Ridge, Illinois. The former church property is now the site of a four-story commercial-residential building.
