= United Church of Canada =

Protestant denomination in Canada

- Église unie du Canada
- The official crest of the United Church of Canada
- Abbreviation: UCCan, EUC
- Type: United church
- Classification: Mainline Protestant
- Orientation: Methodist and Reformed
- Scripture: Protestant Bible
- General Secretary: Michael Blair
- Moderator: Kimberly Heath
- Fellowships: Full communion; UCC; CC(DOC); Mutual Recognition of Ministries; PCRK; UCCP
- Associations: Canadian Council of Churches; World Communion of Reformed Churches; World Council of Churches; World Methodist Council
- Region: Canada and Bermuda
- Origin: June 10, 1925; 101 years ago Mutual Street Arena, Toronto, Ontario
- Merger of: Methodist Church (Canada); Congregational Union of Canada; Two-thirds of the Presbyterian Church in Canada
- Absorbed: Eastern Canadian Conference of the Evangelical United Brethren Church (1968)
- Congregations: 2,451
- Members: 325,315 baptized members
- Official website: united-church.ca

The United Church of Canada (UCCan; French: Église unie du Canada, abbreviated EUC) is the largest Protestant church in Canada. The history of the United Church of Canada began in 1925 with the merger of four Protestant denominations: the Methodist Church (Canada), the Congregational Union of Canada, two-thirds of the congregations of the Presbyterian Church in Canada, and the Association of Local Union Churches located in the Canadian Prairies.

Founded with the aim of becoming a national church, it supported the development of Canada's welfare state and was an active participant in the Canadian residential school system. Other historical priorities included evangelism and the temperance movement; following the 1960s, the church has broadly taken a progressive stance towards social issues and has endorsed religious pluralism. Membership peaked at 1.1 million in 1965 and significantly declined thereafter. In 2023, the church reported having 325,315 members.

The United Church of Canada is organized into 16 regional councils, which elect commissioners to the national General Council. The church's spiritual leader is the moderator, who is elected by the General Council and can either be a member of the laity or the clergy. Regional councils are responsible for ordaining ministers; both ordained and diaconal ministers are permitted to administer the sacraments. The ordination of women into ministry has been permitted from 1936 onwards.

A mainline Protestant church, it considers the Bible to be central to its beliefs and conducts two sacraments: baptism and communion. Baptism is performed with the Trinitarian formula, and communion is offered to both members and non-members. Worship styles vary across congregations; church service are structured through the voluntary use of lectionaries and liturgical books. The United Church of Canada affirms same-sex relationships and has faced controversy over its liberal stance on social issues.

== History ==
=== Beginnings ===
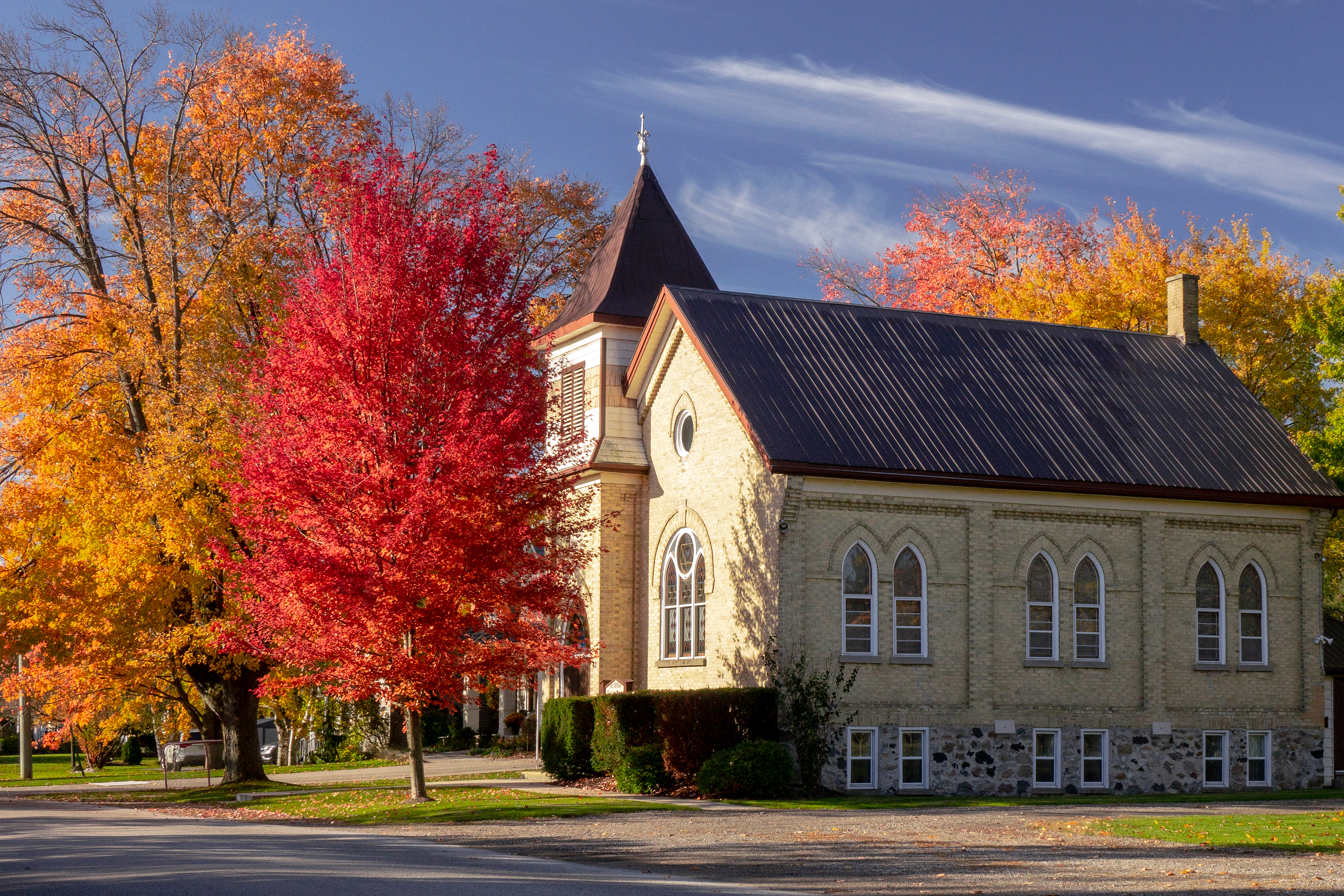
Example of a United Church in a small community (West Montrose, Ontario; built c. 1907)

By the early 20th century, several Protestant groups in Canada had formed national organizations for their respective denominations: these included the Presbyterian Church in Canada in 1875, the Methodist Church of Canada in 1884, and Congregational Union of Canada in 1906. In addition, local churches had been established in the Prairies that served Methodists and Presbyterians alike, many of whom came together to form the General Council of Local Union Churches in 1912. Motivated by a de facto union in the western provinces and the desire to have a single national church for English-speaking Canadians, a committee of Congregationalists, Methodists, and Presbyterians produced a document called the Basis of Union in 1908. The document, which outlined the Protestant doctrines and governance structure of the proposed united church, was soon ratified by the national Methodist and Congregationalist organizations. The General Council of Local Union Churches also entered the church merger process in 1921, which added a fourth denomination to the uniting church.

However, a substantial number of Presbyterians dissented from the movement to merge with the Methodists and Congregationalists, and several votes were held at the congregational level to settle the issue. A final ballot was cast in 1925, in which a third of Presbyterian congregations chose to remain separate from the other denominations as a continuing church.

Inauguration of United Church at Mutual Street Arena, Toronto, on June 10, 1925

To finalize the process of church union, church leaders approached individual provinces and the government of Canada to pass legislation on the transfer of property rights. With the provision that individual churches could vote to remain outside the union, the United Church of Canada came into being through an Act of Parliament that passed on June 27, 1924, and was effective June 10, 1925. On the same day, the church was inaugurated at a large worship service at Toronto's Mutual Street Arena. Hymns from its major denominations were printed on a 38-page order of service and sung: "All people that on earth do dwell" from the Presbyterians; "O for a thousand tongues to sing" by the Methodist leader Charles Wesley; "O God of Bethel" from the Congregationalists; and "When I survey the wondrous cross" by the nonconformist hymn-writer Isaac Watts. At the time of its founding, the United Church was Canada's largest Protestant denomination. The Synod of the Wesleyan Methodist Church of Bermuda joined the church union in 1930.

The ecumenical tone of the new church was set at its first General Council. The former Methodist General Superintendent, Samuel Dwight Chown, was considered by the General Council to be the leading candidate to become the United Church's first Moderator because of his denomination's overwhelming support for union. However, Chown stepped aside in favour of George C. Pidgeon, the pro-union moderator of the Presbyterian Church, in hopes of preventing partisanship from emerging between the union's two largest denominations. Chown typified the early United Church's theological beliefs through his efforts to reconcile evangelism with political action inspired by Social Gospel. The Canadian church's early activities included the establishment of the Woman's Missionary Society, the running of hospitals, international missions, and residential schools for the assimilation of Indigenous children.

=== Early 20th century ===
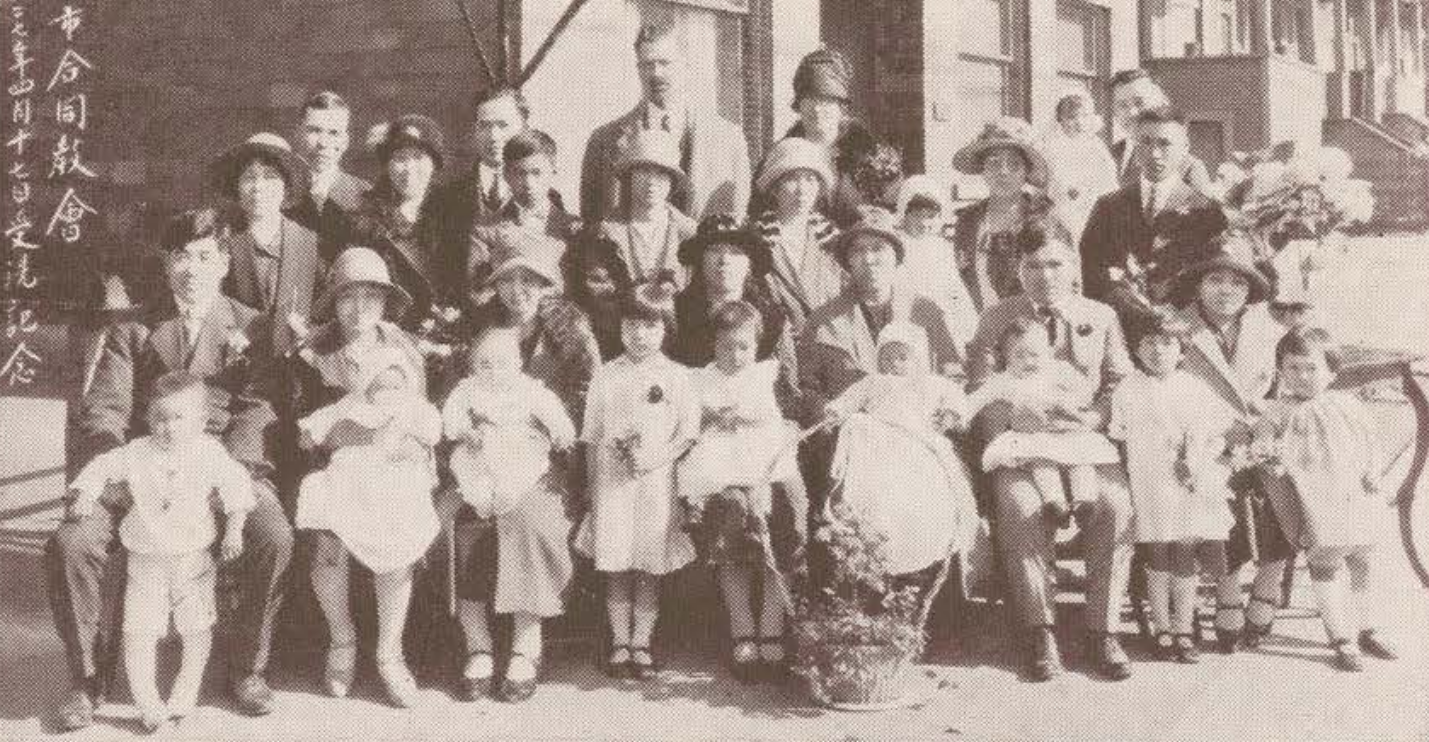
A 1926 baptismal class of the Japanese Mission in Vancouver. Members of the congregation were later interned by the government during World War II.

The church's finances were devastated by the Great Depression, leading to the closure of several pastoral charges. Competing social movements within the church advocated for different responses to the era's crises. This ranged from the Fellowship for a Christian Social Order, which championed radical Christian socialist ideals, to the conservative Oxford Group, which emphasized personal morality. Church leadership occupied a middle position; they were invited to the Royal Commission on Dominion-Provincial Relations and supported measures that would lead to the Canadian welfare state, such as the federal funding of pensions. Women entered ordained ministry for the first time in the United Church of Canada with the ordination of Lydia Emelie Gruchy in 1932. However, the church maintained its predominantly male clergy into the late 20th century; only 4% of its ordained ministers were female by 1978.

The church's response to World War II was divided between pacifists and those who supported the war effort. Several clergy members signed the pacifist declaration A Witness Against War in 1939, and church officials defended conscientious objectors. At the same time, the church provided military chaplains and saw to profit from members purchasing war bonds in its name. Responding to the internment of Japanese Canadians, the General Council announced in 1942 that it recognized "the need of such action" and that it planned "to follow [Japanese congregations] with its ministry and to assure them of sympathy." Local church leaders in British Columbia opposed the government's measure by establishing an Emergency Japanese Committee to advocate for those who were relocated, while the Woman's Missionary Society provided education to interred teenagers in lieu of the provincial government. The United Church of Canada pursued inter-church dialogue by becoming one of the founding bodies of the Canadian Council of Churches in 1944 and the World Council of Churches in 1946.

=== Late 20th century ===
Affiliates in the Canadian Census Over Time
Year	Affiliates
1941	2,208,658
1951	2,867,271
1961	3,664,008
1971	3,768,800
1981	3,758,015
1991	3,093,120

The period between 1945 and the early 1960s was marked by a surge in active members, brought on by the mid-20th-century baby boom and evangelistic campaigns in Canada. The high tide mark of membership was reached in 1965 when the church recorded around 1.1 million members; it was followed by the addition of new congregations after the eastern Canada Conference of the Evangelical United Brethren merged with the United Church in 1968.

The church experienced internal division in 1962 over its theologically liberal New Curriculum, which was followed by the loss of 100,000 students from its Sunday school services in a single year. In 1966, the United Church lost 2,027 members, marking the first time since amalgamation that membership had fallen. The church's Evangelism and Social Service Committee (E&SS) implemented an outreach campaign titled the National Program in the 1960s, which eschewed traditional evangelism for social advocacy. Official stances on domestic issues also shifted in the 1960s; the General Council called for the adoption of universal healthcare, softened its position of total abstinence regarding alcohol and supported remarriage after divorce.

The United Church of Canada recognized the People's Republic of China in 1952 through its General Council, and the E&SS organized sponsorships of Vietnam War draft evaders from the United States. Relations with Canadian Jewish community reached a nadir in 1972, when A. C. Forrest, the editor of the United Church Observer, published an article titled “How Zionists Manipulate Your News". Forrest, a longtime critic of Israel and a supporter of Palestine, received criticism from individual members of the United Church and from B'nai Brith Canada. In 1975, Anglican bishops vetoed a Plan of Union with the United Church of Canada due to the United Church's non-recognition of the historic episcopate. This put an end to a series of intermittent negotiations for union that began with an invitation from the Anglican Church in 1943.

The controversies of the 1980s exacerbated an already declining active membership, and the church itself became increasingly marginalized in Canada. The national leadership’s attempts to address sexuality in particular led to great internal controversy and widespread concern that the national church was “out of touch” with the people in the congregations. All of this contributed to growing financial and structural concerns within the United Church.

— Tracy J. Trothen, The United Church of Canada: A History

Beginning in the 1980s, the church experienced significant controversy and division over its stance on homosexuality. A 1988 statement by the General Council titled Membership, Ministry and Human Sexuality formally permitted the ordination of openly gay men and women. The controversy surrounding the change resulted in split congregations and the resignation of ministers. Organized opposition was led by in-church conservative groups such as the Renewal Fellowship and the then newly-formed Community of Concern. The United Church went on to ordain its first openly gay minister, Tim Stevenson, in 1992. From 1991 to 2001, the number of people claiming an affiliation with the United Church decreased by 8%, the third largest decrease among Canada's large Christian denominations.

The church's official relationship with the Indigenous peoples of Canada in the late 20th century was marked by several apologies, starting with a 1986 apology to First Nations congregations for the church's role in the colonization of Canada. Following lawsuits filed in the late 1980s against the United Church of Canada by students abused in its residential schools, church leadership made formal apologies for its role in the Canadian Indian residential school system. This was followed by the establishment of a donation-led fund for Indigenous communities by the church in 1994.

The church's internal shifts on sexuality and Indigenous relations were concurrent with appeals to the federal government on major social issues. In 1990, the church testified against Bill C-43, a proposed law that would have banned abortion in Canada unless the woman's life or health was threatened. Beginning in 1999, the church supported the legal recognition of same-sex unions through civil unions.

Bill Phipps, elected Moderator in 1997, advocated for a "moral economy" that ran counter to capitalism. On the same year of his election, Phipps oversaw an amelioration of tensions with the Canadian Jewish community when the Bearing Faithful Witness report was sent to the General Council. Phipps echoed the report's recommendations against the conversion of Jews to Christianity, and stated that “Christianity does not supersede Judaism.” Controversy again descended on the church when, soon after his election, Phipps questioned the divine nature of Jesus in an interview with the Ottawa Citizen.

=== 21st century ===
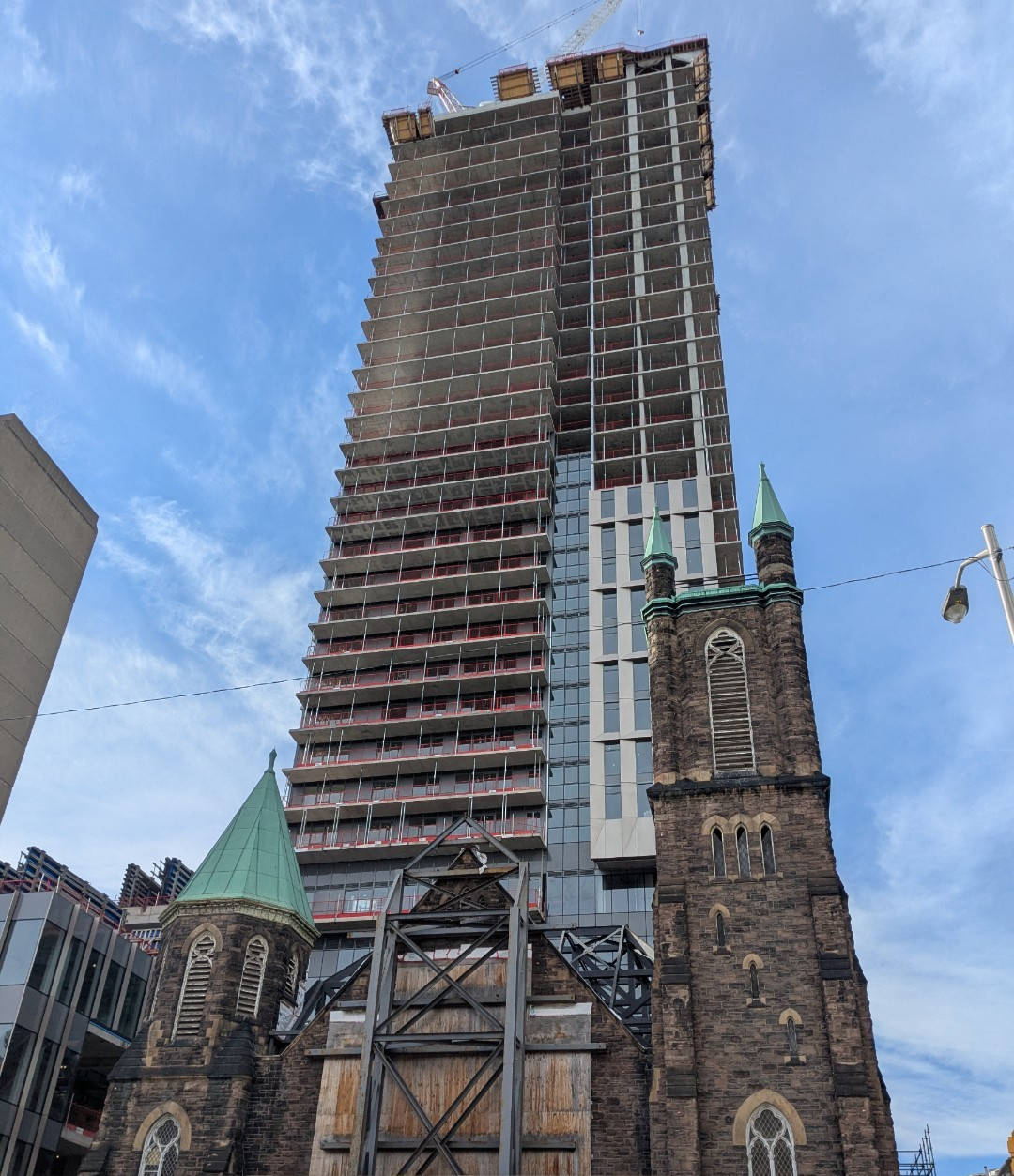
Bloor Street United Church in the process of redevelopment. A condominium tower and offices for the General Council will be built on its premises.

During the early 21st century, the United Church experienced a significant decline in membership: from 640,000 in 2001 to 350,000 in 2021. Several reforms were enacted by the General Council in 2018; the governance structure was reduced from four councils to three, and the practice of "settlement", in which newly ordained ministers were told where to first serve, was eliminated.

The church remained involved in social activism in the early 21st century; the General Council endorsed same-sex marriage in 2003 and called upon the Canadian government to do the same. In 2012, the 41st General Council elected Gary Paterson as the first openly gay Moderator. The same council also approved a boycott of goods from Israeli settlements in the West Bank; the Canadian Jewish Congress broke off its consultation with the Canadian Council of Churches in response.

Public debate around Gretta Vosper, a minister in the United Church, surged in response to a 2008 publication where Vosper argued that references to God had become obsolete in the church. By 2015, Vosper publicly identified as an atheist and faced dismissal from her position by church governance. Initially found to be unsuitable for ministry by the Toronto Conference in 2016, Vosper reached a settlement in 2018 that allowed her to continue as the minister of West Hill United.

Dwindling funds and congregations has led to church land, such as Deer Park United Church in Toronto and Sackville United Church in New Brunswick, being sold to property developers. With the stated intent of "[keeping] real estate in the United Church" by constructing affordable homes on church land, the church formed the United Property Resource Corporation (UPRC) in 2020. Beginning in 2022, the church has funded Kindred Works, a for-profit company that is majority-owned by the church, to redevelop unused church land and existing buildings into rental properties.

== Residential schools ==
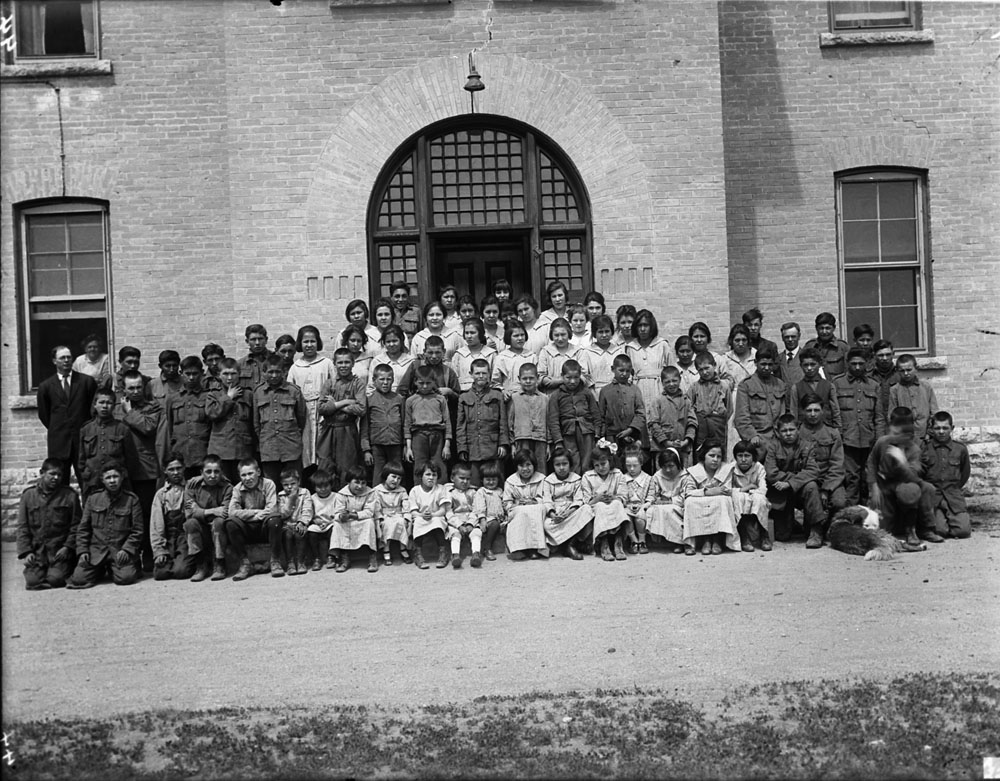
Students of United Church-operated Brandon Indian Residential School in 1946. The Truth and Reconciliation Commission of Canada stated that the school "took on many of the aspects of a jail."

The United Church of Canada was an active participant in the Canadian Indian residential school system, in which boarding schools were established to culturally assimilate Indigenous children in Canada. From its formation in 1925, the United Church assumed control over Methodist and Presbyterian residential schools that were established by its denominational predecessors in the late 19th century. By 1931, the United Church ran approximately 16 percent of Canada's residential schools. The United Church managed its residential schools through the Board of Home Missions and largely relied on funding from the federal government; significant internal fundraising also came from the Women's Missionary Society.

Residential schools carried out their goal of assimilation by prohibiting the usage of Indigenous languages and cultural practices. Schools operated by the United Church of Canada neglected Indigenous children and subjected them to physical and sexual abuse. Corporal punishment was commonplace, as was hunger and diseases such as tuberculosis. Several students suffered injuries or died during runaway attempts from school.

The United Church Indian Workers rejected a proposal from the Department of Indian Affairs to replace residential schools with day schools in 1936. The church's official stance on residential schools began to shift by the late 1950s, when day schools were affirmed by reports to the General Council. The United Church of Canada passed responsibility for its last residential school, located in Port Alberni, over to the Canadian government in 1969; the school was closed in 1973.

Described as a cultural genocide by the Truth and Reconciliation Commission of Canada, the residential school system has resulted in a painful legacy for many Indigenous people and their communities. The General Council gave an apology to Indigenous members of the church in 1986; it was the first institutional apology for residential schools in Canada. The All Native Circle Conference of Indigenous congregations chose to receive the apology instead of accepting it.

Former students of Alberni Indian Residential School filed a lawsuit against the United Church in 1996; the church denied that it was liable for the abuse that occurred in the school. The Supreme Court of Canada ultimately ruled that the church was responsible for paying 25 percent of the damages, with the federal government paying the remainder. Moderator Bill Phipps issued a formal apology for residential schools in 1998:

As Moderator of The United Church of Canada, I wish to speak the words that many people have wanted to hear for a very long time. On behalf of The United Church of Canada, I apologize for the pain and suffering that our church's involvement in the Indian Residential School system has caused. We are aware of some of the damage that this cruel and ill-conceived system of assimilation has perpetrated on Canada's First Nations peoples. For this we are truly and most humbly sorry. To those individuals who were physically, sexually, and mentally abused as students of the Indian Residential Schools in which The United Church of Canada was involved, I offer you our most sincere apology. You did nothing wrong. You were and are the victims of evil acts that cannot under any circumstances be justified or excused.

— Moderator Bill Phipps on behalf of the General Council Executive, October 27, 1998.

Reconciliation efforts in the 21st century from the United Church include its assent of the Indian Residential Schools Settlement Agreement and the establishment of a Healing Fund for Indigenous Canadians. The church has also financially supported Indigenous language revitalization efforts, and released its residential school records to the public.

== Organization ==
=== Governance ===
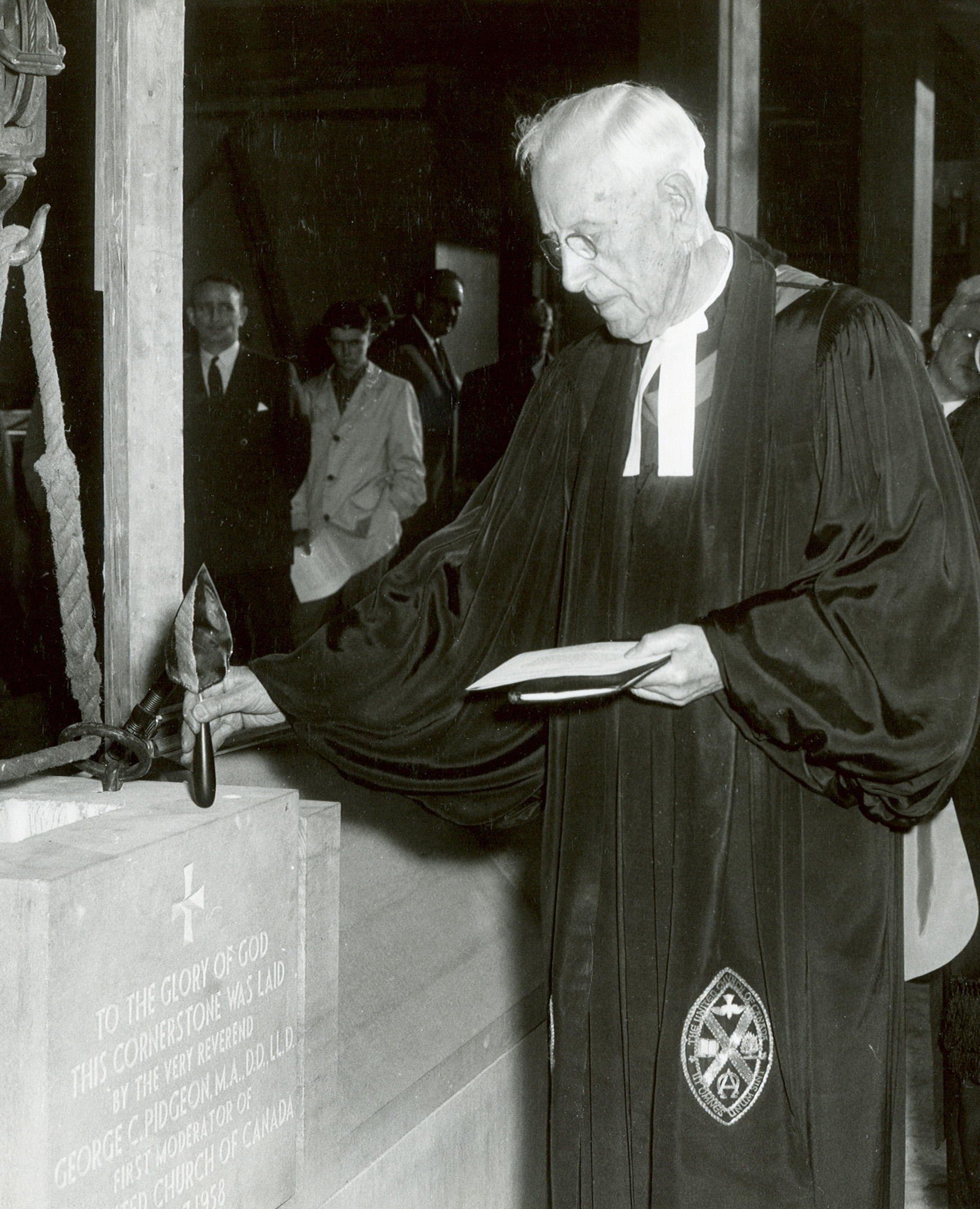
George C. Pidgeon, the first moderator of the United Church of Canada

The United Church has three layers of church governance: communities of faith, which preside over worship groups; regional councils, which operate sub-nationally; and the General Council, which oversees the church on a national level. Church governance is outlined in two documents: The Manual, which is regularly updated by the General Council, and the Basis of Union. The General Council has the power to introduce changes to the Basis of Union, but each change must be ratified by the lower councils.

The United Church has approximately 2,400 communities of faith, which are served by 16 regional councils. Communities of faith have a flexible form, allowing for both temporary, transitional and durable ministries. Many communities of faith are individual congregations and pastoral charges that manage one or more such congregations. Other communities of faith include outreach ministries, chaplaincies, faith-based communal livings, social justice ministries, house and student churches, and online communities. Communities of faith and their respective congregations control their own finances and select their own ministers. Regional councils have the authority to recognize new communities of faith and assist the pastoral relationship between ministers and their congregations. Members of a regional council include all clergy within the region and lay representatives from the region's communities of faith.

The General Council, legally known as the Denominational Council, is the national legislative organ of the United Church of Canada. It consists of clergy and lay commissioners, elected by the regional councils, who meet every three years to set church policy. Between these triennial meetings, the church is governed by the General Council Executive, whose members are appointed by the General Council to six-year terms. At every General Council meeting, a moderator of the United Church of Canada is elected to act as the church's spiritual leader and public representative. Both clergy members and laypeople have been elected to the position; the current moderator is the minister Kimberly Heath.

=== Ministry ===
Ministers in the United Church of Canada can be ordained, diaconal, or part of the laity. Ordained and diaconal ministers belong to a single Order of Ministry, have aligned salaries, and are permitted to administer the sacraments. The ordained ministry was originally limited to men in the United Church, while the diaconal ministry has been historically composed of women and was not permitted to administer the sacraments until 1980. A change to the Basis of Union allowed the ordination of women from 1936 onwards; the ordination of married women in particular was permitted after a 1964 General Council ruling. An internal survey in 2025 reported that 46% of ministers in the United Church were women. Lay ministers serve congregations on a temporary basis and require a license from their regional council to administer the sacraments.

The United Church of Canada operates several theological schools, often in conjunction with other denominations. These schools include Emmanuel College, which is affiliated with the University of Toronto, and the Centre for Christian Studies, which educationally supports the diaconal ministry. The national Office of Vocation accredits and oversees the church's ministers, while regional councils are responsible for their ordination. The church mutually recognizes ministers from the United Church of Christ in the Philippines and the Presbyterian Church in the Republic of Korea. The United Church of Canada is in full communion with United Church of Christ in the United States and the Disciples of Christ.

=== Missionaries ===
Missionaries from the United Church are sent by request to autonomous churches, who supervise the missionaries directly. Historically, the United Church sponsored and managed of its own overseas missions from Canada. Several missions in Asia, the Caribbean, and Africa were inherited from the church's founding denominations and continued to operate into the 1960s. These institutions were supervised by the Board of Overseas Missions, which was renamed the Board of World Mission in 1962.

During the mid 20th-century, the United Church experienced periods of external resistance against Christian evangelism and an internal theological shift towards pluralism. These factors contributed to several missionaries adopting a more liberal stance towards other religions, a view that was formally expressed through the World Mission report to the General Council in 1966. Authored by clergy, academics, and former missionaries, the report called for dialogue with non-Christians in lieu of traditional evangelism and that an egalitarian model of cooperation be adopted with churches unaffiliated with the United Church.

== Membership ==
Baptized members of the United Church are considered full members after they make a profession of faith before their congregation. Professions of faith are made by baptized adolescents as a rite of passage comparable to confirmation and during adult baptisms. Although professions of faith take place at the congregational level, full membership can be transferred freely from congregation to congregation. The right to serve on governing bodies and vote in congregational meetings is automatically given to full members. Voting rights can also be granted by full members during congregational meetings to "adherents", who are non-members who regularly attend church. Congregations may remove members for non-attendance, a practice which began in the 1960s.

=== Statistics ===
The United Church is the largest Protestant denomination in Canada. The church had more than 1,000,000 affiliates in the 2021 Canadian census, which accounted for 3.3% of the national population. Atlantic Canada has a greater proportion of United Church affiliates than the national average. In 2023, the church reported having 325,315 members in 243,689 households under pastoral care, of whom 110,878 attended services regularly. The church's low membership compared to census afilliates has been noted by historians Brian Clarke and Stuart MacDonald, who argue that the gap represents those who identify with the church but no longer attend services regularly. A 2019 survey by Statistics Canada found that affiliates of the United Church attended church at a below-average rate compared to other religious Canadians; 19% reported going to church on a monthly basis or more, which was comparable to Anglican respondents.

== Beliefs and practices ==
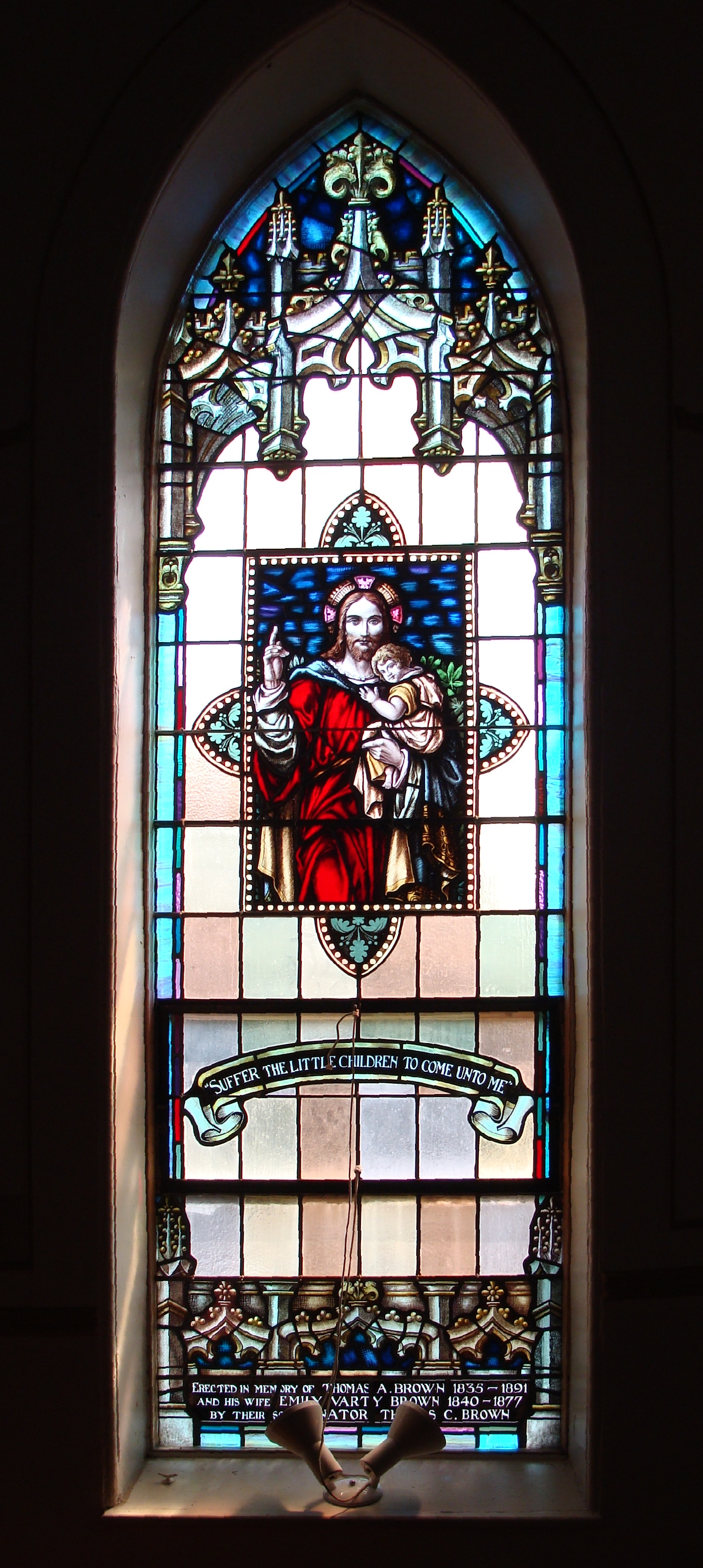
A stained glass window in a United Church in Deseronto, Ontario depicts Jesus with a quotation from the Bible.

The beliefs of the United Church have been articulated in four "faith statements" that have been published throughout its history, all of which are subordinate to the Bible. The first faith statement was the Basis of Union, which was drafted in 1908 and adopted in 1925. Subsequent faith statements include the Statement of Faith in 1940, A New Creed in 1968, and A Song of Faith in 2006. The church affirmed "the creeds of the ancient church" in the Basis of Union, and used Apostles' Creed during communion services into the 1960s.

Earlier faith statements remain in force even after newer statements are introduced. However, past doctrines are not binding. For instance, the church has de-emphasized the concept of eternal punishment in its latter two faith statements and revised earlier restrictions to allow women in ministry. The statement of faith found in the Basis of Union upholds the tenets of Evangelicalism. Later statements tend to reflect an ecumenical and pluralistic approach to religion.

The United Church is considered a mainline Protestant denomination, and has inherited doctrines from Methodist, Presbyterian, and Congregationalist traditions. In its Basis of Union, the church attempted to reconcile the doctrines of Calvinism and Arminianism to present a unified Protestant theology. The church requires ministers to be in "essential agreement" with doctrine as articulated in the faith statements. Members are also required to become followers of and make a profession of faith in Jesus Christ. Formal additions to the church's existing faith statements require both the General Council and the majority of all pastoral charges to vote in favour of the change. Beyond these core principles, the church has permitted a wide range of theological positions and is significantly influenced by liberal Christianity.

=== Bible ===
In its Basis of Union, the United Church of Canada states that the Bible is central to the Christian faith and inspired by God. Later theologians within the church, such as the Committee on Christian Faith in 1966, stressed that the Bible was recorded by fallible human witnesses to God's self-revelation. As such, they rejected biblical infallibility. The church uses several principles to interpret the Bible and states that its primary principle is Christocentrism, which involves reading the text in light of Jesus' life and ministry. Other principles of interpretation include the promotion of social justice and the historical-critical method, in which the Bible is interpreted in context with its time of authorship. According to the United Church, it rejects interpretations that condone slavery or condemn homosexuality.

=== Sacraments ===
The two sacraments of the United Church are baptism and communion, a feature that it shares with Reformed churches. All ordained ministers from the church can administer the sacraments, and diaconal ministers in active employment are automatically licensed to do the same. Leaders among the laity can also administer the sacraments with a license from their regional council. The United Church has emphasized different aspects of the sacraments over time: the Basis of Union defines them as a "means of grace" instituted by Jesus, while A Song of Faith eschews a formal definition by describing them as "the sacred in the midst of life."

==== Baptism ====
Baptism with water is the first step in church membership, and is done in the name of God the Father, God the Son, and the Holy Spirit. Since 1975, baptisms performed by the United Church have been recognized by Presbyterians, Lutherans, Catholics, and Anglicans. The United Church has permitted both infant and adult baptisms since its founding. Baptisms are performed in front of the congregation; in the case of infant baptism, at least one parent must profess their faith during the sacrament. The church states that baptism "requires no further ritual to make it complete," but allows for the Christian rite of confirmation in which the baptized make their own profession of faith.

==== Communion ====
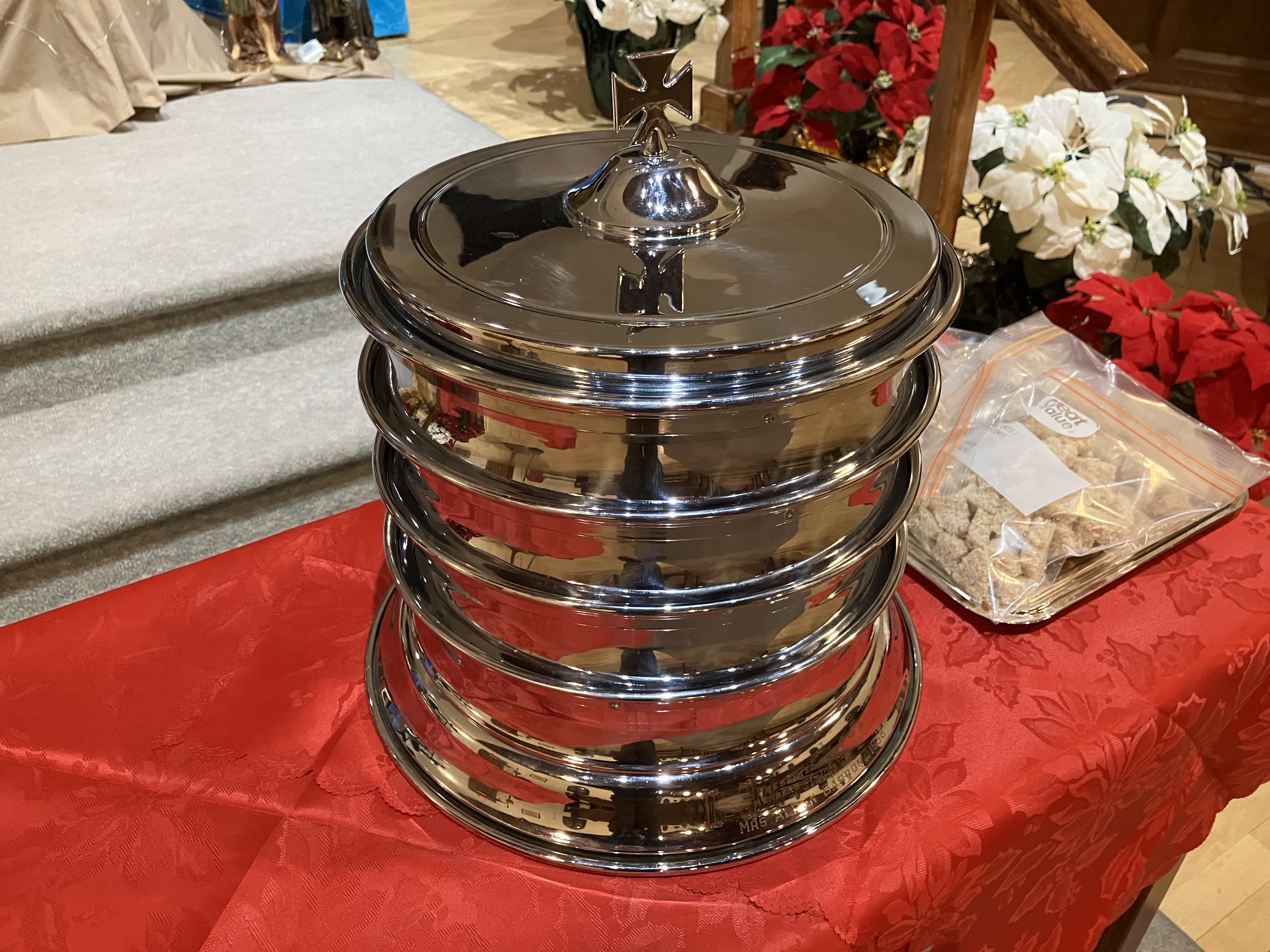
A communion tray used in a United Church to serve grape juice at communion.

The sacrament of communion involves prayers of thanksgiving, the remembrance of Jesus at the Last Supper, and the ritual sharing of bread and wine; in the United Church of Canada, grape juice is commonly used in place of wine. In light of the ecumenical liturgical movement that arose from the Second Vatican Council, several congregations in the United Church began to hold the sacrament on a monthly basis instead of four times a year. The church practices open communion, with no restriction regarding age, membership, or baptismal status. Though a policy in 1982 formally allowed children to receive communion, objections to the practice extended into the 2000s.

The sacrament is usually celebrated at a communion table at the front of the sanctuary, where the minister blesses the elements before they are distributed to the congregation. The actual distribution can take several forms: congregants may drink from a common chalice or engage in intinction by dipping a portion of bread into wine. The United Church's inaugural service involved simultaneous communion, in which congregants drank from individual cups of pasteurized grape juice in unison.

=== Liturgy ===
A variety of liturgical styles exist within the United Church, but liturgical books are periodically published by the church's national organization for voluntary use in worship. Nearly all congregations use a lectionary, with the most popular one being the Revised Common Lectionary. Contemporary Sunday worship, as described by the 2000 service book Celebrate God's Presence, involves the singing of hymns, Bible readings, a sermon, offerings, prayers of the people, and the conclusion of the service with a benediction.

The United Church's first service book was the Forms of Service in 1926, which incorporated liturgies from each of the church's main founding denominations. The majority of the content in Forms of Service corresponded to existing Presbyterian liturgies, themselves derived from the Book of Common Order used by the Church of Scotland. Subsequent service books in the early 20th century were less heterogeneous and reflected a greater unity of worship patterns within the church.

=== Music ===
Hymns are sung at several points during congregational worship in the United Church of Canada, often with the backing of a choir. Voices United, a hymnal widely used within the church, was published in 1996. It received a supplement titled More Voices in 2007. Both books are characterized by the inclusion of contemporary compositions and songs from churches outside Canada. The church also published a digital hymnal titled Then Let Us Sing! in 2025. Hymnals have consistently held liturgical significance within the church; church historian Bruce Harding named the 1930 Hymnary "the prayer book of The United Church of Canada", while Voices United contained the church's baptismal creeds instead of Celebrate God's Presence, its companion service book.

=== Marriage ===
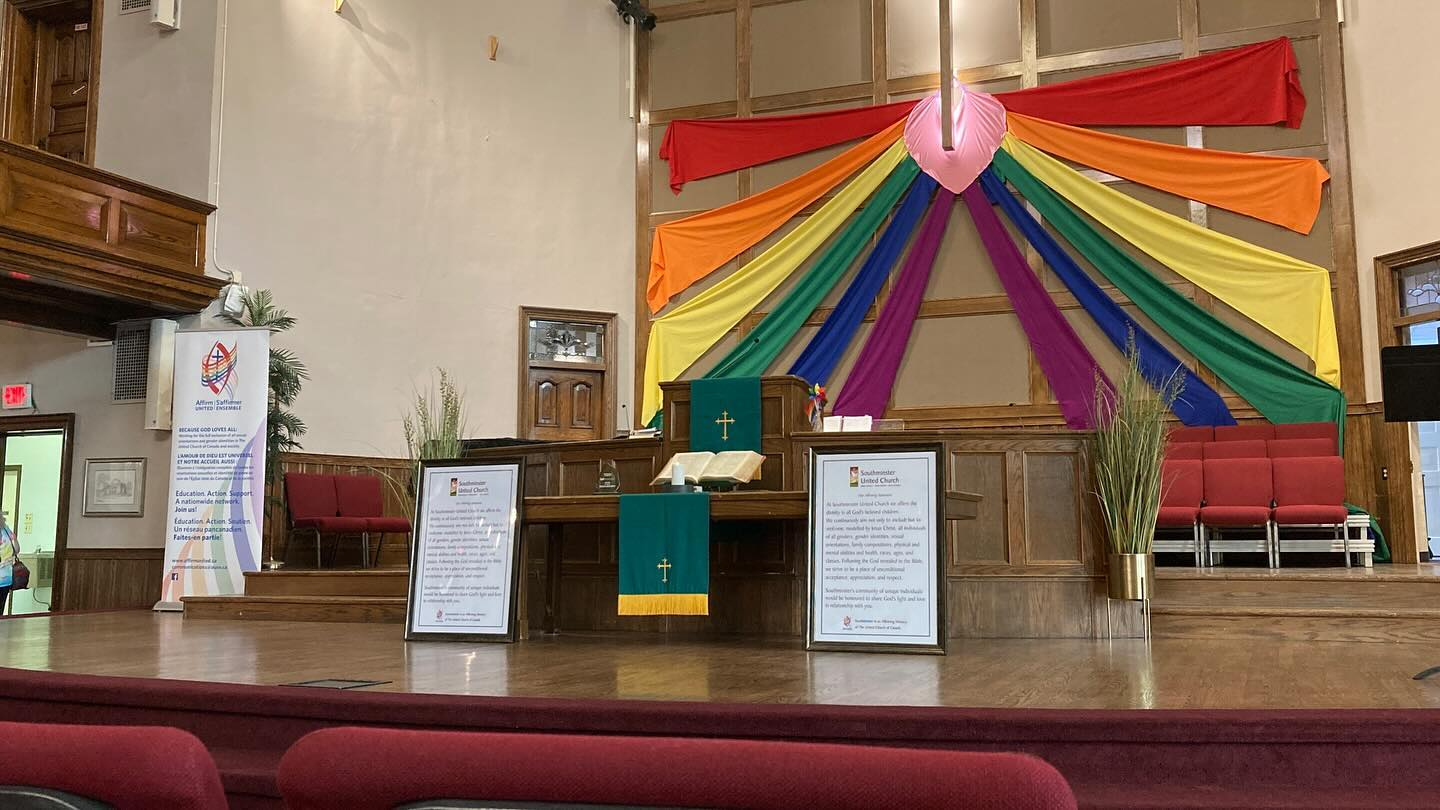
Several hundred congregations of the United Church, such as Southminster United Church in Lethbridge, formally affirm same-sex relationships.

Before and during the 1960s, the United Church generally espoused a conservative view of sexuality. A 1960 report to the General Council on sexuality cautioned against reading the Bible in a manner that would support "literalism and legalism". At the same time, it denounced abortion and described homosexuality as sinful. Similarly, the secretary of the Evangelism and Social Service Committee, Ray Hord, stated in a 1968 interview that homosexuality was an "aberration” that would preclude candidates from becoming ministers, but supported its decriminalization.

The church first permitted ministers to solemnize the marriages of previously divorced people in 1962, but did not make it mandatory. "Marriage breakdown" was ultimately recognized as valid grounds for divorce by the General Council in 1966. The church continued to liberalize its stance on sexual ethics in the 1970s; intimacy was deemed the primary purpose of marriage, which supplanted previous messaging on marriage that promoted procreation and parenthood. In 1988, the General Council described abortion as the "lesser of two evils" and called for the prevention of abortions through the improvement of contraception and family planning instead of legislation.

The church also affirms remarriage between the previously divorced and interfaith marriages.

In 1982, progressive churches founded the Affirm United/S'affirmer Ensemble network for the inclusion of LGBTQ people. It is renamed Affirm United/S’affirmer Ensemble in 1994. In 2000, the church endorsed the organization.

In 1995, the Church published Together in Faith: Inclusive Resources about Sexual Diversity for Study, Dialogue, Celebration, and Action provides liturgical and pastoral resources for same-sex covenants. In 1999, representatives of the Church appeared before Parliament's Standing Committee on Justice and Human Rights to speak in favour of a bill extending survivor pension rights to same-sex couples on the same basis as those in heterosexual relationships.

A 2000 resolution allows local churches to decide about blessings of same-sex unions.

It also spoke out in favor of same-sex marriage in Canada in 2005, in order to promote love, commitment, fidelity, and the sanctity of marriage within the LGBT community.

== Social issues ==
The founding denominations of the United Church were strong proponents of missionary activity and social reform. As such, the early United Church sought to influence the Canadian public towards evangelical Christian values such as temperance while tackling social issues such as class discrimination and labour relations. After the 1960s, the church's historical priority of regulating moral behavior began to give way to a focus on human rights and social justice.

The church's liberal stance on social issues is controversial among other Protestants. Mark Noll, a historian of Christianity in the United States, attributed the United Church's demographic decline to a "modernistic social gospel" that undermined its Christian identity, while the United Church historian Phyllis Airhart posited that the drop in membership was part of Christianity's broader decline in the English-speaking world.

=== Political involvement ===
Before the 1960s, the church played a significant role in Canadian political life: John G. Diefenbaker addressed its General Council in 1958, and notable figures such as Lester B. Pearson and the suffragist Nellie McClung were adherents of the church. However, the church's attempts to limit gambling and the liquor trade had little effect on government legislation. The church after the 1960s has been described as "the NDP at prayer" due to its progressive stances, a title that references Canada's left-wing New Democratic Party.

The contemporary church's attempts to influence Canadian politics has seen varying success. In 1990, the church testified against Bill C-43, a proposed law that would have banned abortion in Canada unless the woman's life or health was threatened. The bill later failed in the Senate. In a similar manner, the church lobbied for the recognition of same-sex marriage to the Canadian government before it was legalized in 2005. Later efforts to protest the policies of Stephen Harper's conservative government had minimal effect.

== Symbols ==
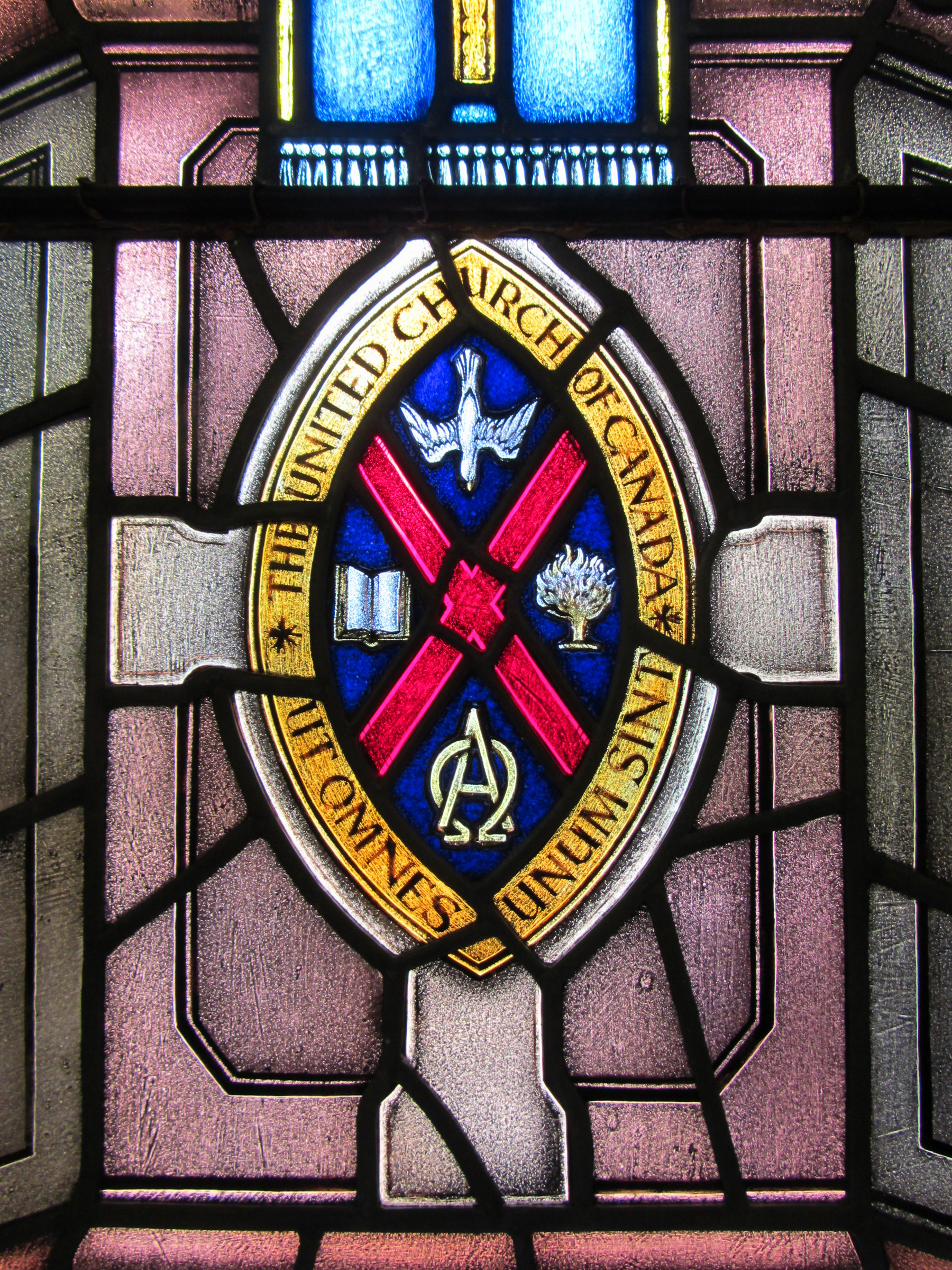
The previous crest of the United Church contained a single motto: Ut omnes unum sint.

=== Crest ===
Adopted in 1944, the crest of the United Church takes the shape of the vesica piscis, an early Christian symbol that evoked an upended fish (the initials of the phrase "Jesus Christ, Son of God, Saviour"; in Ancient Greek: ἰχθύς (ikhthús), ichthys, meaning "fish"). The crest features Saint Andrew's Cross, whose namesake is the patron saint of Scotland. Within three of the four quadrants are symbols of the founding churches: Presbyterianism (the burning bush), Methodism (the dove), and Congregationalism (the open Bible). In the bottom quadrant, the alpha and omega represents God as described by Revelation 1:8). The motto Ut omnes unum sint recalls Christ’s prayer in John 17:21: "That all may be one".

In 2012, the Mohawk language phrase "Akwe Nia'tetewá:neren" ("All my relations") was added to the perimeter, and the background colours of the four quadrants of the crest were changed to reflect the colours of an Indigenous medicine wheel.
