= List of electoral firsts in Canada =

This article lists notable achievements of women, ethnic minorities, people with disabilities, and gay/lesbian/bisexual and transgender people in Canadian politics and elections in Canada.

This list includes:

- Members of Parliament—Members of the House of Commons of Canada;
- Senators—Members of the Senate of Canada
- Governor-general—Canadian Governors General and Lieutenant Governors
- Members of the Legislative Assembly (MLAs);
- Members of Provincial Parliament (MPPs in Ontario);
- Members of the National Assembly (MNAs) in Quebec; and
- Members of the House of Assembly (MHAs) in Newfoundland and Labrador.

== Women ==
- First female elected in Canada:
  - Maria Grant is the first woman in Canada to be elected to any office, in 1895. She served six years on the Victoria School board and was presented to the future George V as the only woman elected as a school trustee in Canada.
- First female candidate in provincial election in Canada:
  - Margaret Haile ran as a candidate of the Canadian Socialist League in Toronto North for the 1902 Ontario provincial election, becoming the first woman ever to stand in a provincial election in Canada. She herself was not allowed to vote in the election.
- First woman elected to a Canadian government body (first woman in Canada elected at the federal, provincial or municipal government levels):
  - Hannah Gale, Alderman in Calgary, 1917. (This was the first city election in Canada where a proportional representation electoral system (Single transferable voting) was used.)
- First woman elected to a legislature in Canada:
  - Louise McKinney, first woman elected to a legislature anywhere in the British Empire, member 1917–1921 of the Legislative Assembly of Alberta for the Non Partisan League, a left-wing prohibitionist socialist party. (Roberta MacAdams, a member of the Canadian Army Medical Corps, was also elected in the 1917 Alberta general election by Albertans serving in the First World War. By the time the armed forces election was held, McKinney was already in the legislative assembly.)

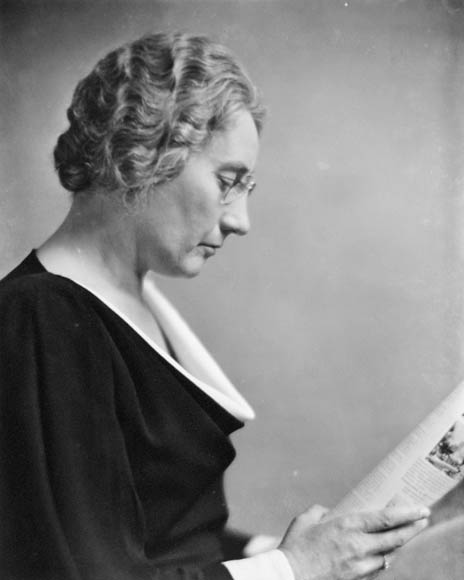
Agnes Macphail, Canada's first Woman MP

- First two women serving at the same time in a legislature anywhere in Canada:
  - Alberta MLAs Louise McKinney and Roberta McAdams, served 1917 to 1921
- First woman candidates in a federal election.
  - Five women ran in the first federal election in which women were allowed to run as candidates (1921). (Note: Some women had been granted the right to vote, but not to run as candidates, in the wartime election of 1917. Even in 1921, still many women were denied the right to vote – status Indians, those on the Indian Register, did not get the right to vote in federal elections until 1960.)
  - Harriet S. Dick, Winnipeg Centre, Independent; 2,314 (4th Place, 4/5)
  - Rose Mary Louise Henderson, St. Lawrence—St. George, Labour Party; 510 (Last Place, 3/3)
  - Elizabeth Bethune Kiely, Toronto East, Liberal; 52 votes (Last Place, 5/5)
  - Agnes Macphail, Grey Southeast, Progressive Party/United Farmers of Ontario; 6,958. Elected. (1st; 1/3)
  - Harriet Dunlop Prenter, Toronto West, Labour Party; 1,741 (Last Place, 3/3)
- First women to serve in the Canadian House of Commons:
  - Agnes Macphail, Progressive, United Farmers of Ontario, Labour, Co-operative Commonwealth Federation (CCF). She served as Ontario MP in ridings of Grey South and Grey—Bruce, from 1921 to 1940. She was also one of two women who were the first women MPPs in the Legislative Assembly of Ontario for the Ontario CCF (the forerunner to the New Democratic Party) for the riding of York East 1943–1945 and 1948–1951
  - Martha Black, Independent Conservative, MP Yukon, 1935–1940
  - Dorise Nielsen, Unity (Communist) and Labor-Progressive (Communist) MP North Battleford, Saskatchewan 1940–1945
  - Cora Taylor Casselman, teacher, Liberal MP, Edmonton East (Alberta). 1941 (by-election) –1945
  - Gladys Strum, teacher, CCF MP Qu'Appelle, Saskatchewan, 1945–1949
- First woman to run in for a federal seat in Quebec:
  - Idola Saint-Jean ran as Independent-Liberal candidate in 1930. (First woman to be elected as MP in Quebec—Monique Bégin, 1972.)
- First female prime minister:
  - Kim Campbell, Progressive Conservative Prime Minister 1993

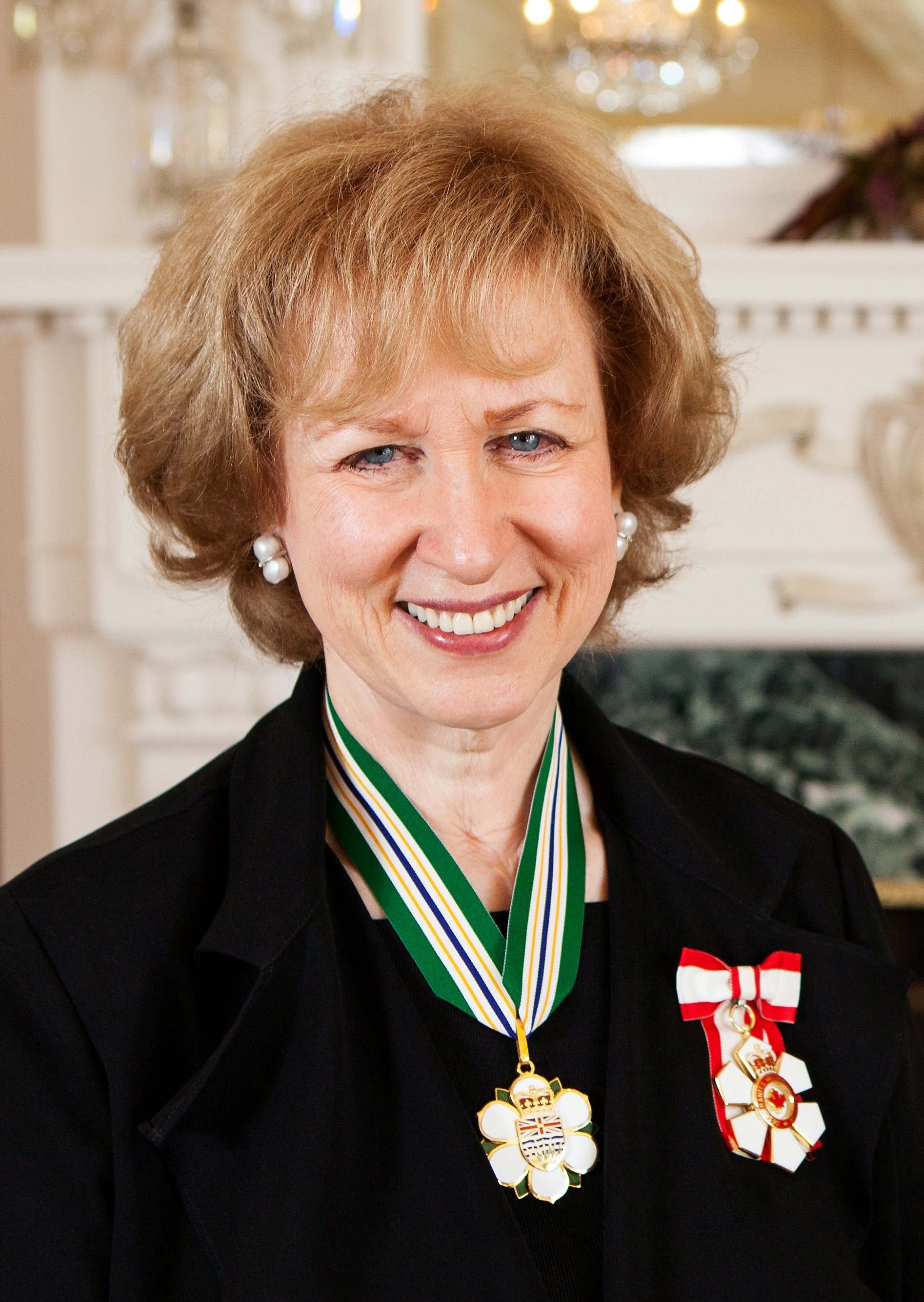
Kim Campbell, Canada's first female Prime Minister

First women in cabinet

- Provincial and Territorial:
  - Mary Ellen Smith, 1921, British Columbia, Independent Liberal
  - Irene Parlby, 1921, Alberta, United Farmers of Alberta
  - Marie-Claire Kirkland Casgrain, 1962, Quebec, Liberal
  - Thelma Forbes, 1966, Manitoba, Progressive Conservative
  - Hilda Watson, 1970, Yukon, Consensus government in Canada
  - Brenda Robertson, 1970, New Brunswick, Progressive Conservative
  - Margaret Birch, 1972, Ontario, Progressive Conservative
  - Jean Canfield, 1972, Prince Edward Island, Liberal
  - Hazel Newhook and Lynn Verge, Newfoundland and Labrador, Progressive Conservative
  - Joan Duncan and Patricia Anne Smith, 1982, Saskatchewan, Progressive Conservative
  - Nellie Cournoyea, 1984, Northwest Territories, consensus government
  - Maxine Cochran, 1985, Nova Scotia, Progressive Conservative
  - Manitok Thompson, 1999, Nunavut, consensus government
- Federal:
  - Ellen Fairclough, 1957, Progressive Conservative
  - Associate Minister of National Defence: Mary Collins
- First female cabinetmember with a portfolio: Tilly Rolston
- First female Speaker of the Canadian House of Commons:
  - Jeanne Sauvé, 1980–1984
- First female federal Justice Minister (Attorney General):
  - Kim Campbell (Progressive Conservative)
- First female Defence Minister:
  - Kim Campbell, (Progressive Conservative)
- First female Minister of Finance:
  - Chrystia Freeland, (Liberal)
- First female Speaker of the House
  - Nancy Hodges British Columbia Liberal, MLA 1941–1953, made speaker of British Columbia legislature in December 1949.
- First female senator:
  - Cairine Wilson, 1930
- First female Governor General of Canada:
  - Jeanne Sauvé, (1984–1990)
- First female premiers
  - Rita Johnston, British Columbia, 1991 (Social Credit)
  - Nellie Cournoyea, Northwest Territories, 1991–1995, (Consensus government)
  - Catherine Callbeck, Prince Edward Island, 1993–1996, (first elected female Premier) (Liberal)
  - Pat Duncan, Yukon, 2000–2002, (Liberal)
  - Eva Aariak, Nunavut, 2008–2013, (Consensus government)
  - Kathy Dunderdale, Newfoundland and Labrador, 2010–2014, (Progressive Conservative)
  - Alison Redford, Alberta, 2011–2014, (Progressive Conservative)
  - Pauline Marois, Quebec, 2012–2014, (Parti Québécois)
  - Kathleen Wynne, Ontario, 2013–2018, (Liberal)
  - Heather Stefanson, Manitoba, 2021–2023, (Progressive Conservative)
  - Susan Holt, New Brunswick, 2024–present (Liberal)

(Nova Scotia, and Saskatchewan have not yet had a female premier.)

- First female deputy premier in:
  - British Columbia: Grace McCarthy
- First female MLAs elected in British Columbia:
  - Mary Ellen Smith, Liberal MLA 1918–1928, elected to replace her late husband
- First female MLA elected in Alberta:
  - Louise McKinney, she was also the first woman elected anywhere in the British Empire, 1917–1921 Alberta Legislature for the Non Partisan League, a left-wing Prohibitionist socialist party.
- First female MLA elected in Saskatchewan:
  - Sarah Ramsland, Saskatchewan Liberal, Pelly 1919 by-election, 1925. Replaced her husband Max who won the seat in 1917 general election after his death. Was re-elected in 1921 and defeated in 1925.
- First female MLA elected in Manitoba:
  - Edith McTavish Rogers, Manitoba Liberal MLA 1920–1932
- First female MPPs elected in Ontario:
  - Agnes Macphail and Rae Luckock, CCF (the forerunner to the New Democratic Party MPPs for York East 1943–1945, 1948–1951 and for Bracondale 1943–1945 respectively
- First female MNA elected in Quebec:
  - Marie-Claire Kirkland, elected in 1961. Also first woman appointed a cabinet minister in Quebec, the first woman appointed acting premier, and the first woman judge to serve in the Quebec Provincial Court.
- First female MLA elected in New Brunswick:
  - Brenda Robertson, New Brunswick Progressive Conservative MLA, 1967–1984
- First female candidate in Prince Edward Island:
  - Hilda Ramsay, Prince Edward Island CCF candidate in 1951
- First female MLA elected in Prince Edward Island:
  - Jean Canfield, Prince Edward Island Liberal MLA 1970–1979
- First female MHA elected in Newfoundland and Labrador (pre-Confederation):
  - Helena Squires, MHA 1930–1932
- First female MLA elected in Nova Scotia:
  - Gladys Porter, Nova Scotia Progressive Conservative MLA 1960–1967
- First female MLA elected in Yukon:
  - G. Jean Gordon, non-affiliated, MLA 1967–1970
- First female MLA elected in Northwest Territories:
  - Lena Pedersen (Pederson) in 1970 to 1975
- First female MLA elected in Nunavut:
  - Manitok Thompson, Independent, 1999–2003 (Nunavut was created from the Northwest Territories in 1999, so Thompson served in its first legislature.)
- First female elected in a Nova Scotia municipal election:
  - Mary Teresa Sullivan, Halifax City Council, 1936+
- First female elected in an Ontario municipal election:
  - Constance Hamilton, Toronto City Council, 1920–21
- First female mayor, appointed:
  - Violet Barss, Delia, Alberta (1920–1922)
- First female mayor, elected:
  - Barbara Hanley, Webbwood, Ontario (1936–1944)
- First female mayor of a city:
  - Charlotte Whitton, Ottawa (1951–1956, 1960–1964)
- First female mayor of:
  - Kentville, Nova Scotia: Gladys Porter (1946–1960)
  - Ottawa, Ontario: Charlotte Whitton (1951–1956, 1960–1964)
  - Prince Rupert, British Columbia: Nora Arnold (1947–1950)
  - Edmonton, Alberta: Jan Reimer (1989–1995)
- First female city councillor in:
  - Vancouver: Helena Gutteridge in 1937.
- First female judge in
  - British Columbia: Helen Gregory MacGill in 1917
- First female chief justice in:
  - British Columbia: Beverley McLachlin in 1988
  - Canada: Beverley McLachlin in 2000
- Female presidents of 3 bishops at major political parties
  - Agnes Macphail, founding president of the Ontario CCF 1932–34
  - Gladys Strum, President of Saskatchewan CCF 1944-195?
- First female lieutenant governors
  - Pauline Mills McGibbon, 22nd lieutenant-governor of Ontario 1974–1980
  - Pearl McGonigal, 19th lieutenant-governor of Manitoba 1981–1986
  - Helen Hunley, 12th lieutenant-governor of Alberta 1985–1991
  - Sylvia Fedoruk, 17th lieutenant-governor of Saskatchewan 1988–1994
  - Marion Reid, 24th lieutenant-governor of Prince Edward Island 1990–1995
  - Margaret McCain, 27th lieutenant-governor of New Brunswick 1994–1997
  - Lise Thibault, 27th lieutenant-governor of Quebec 1997–2007
  - Myra Freeman, 29th lieutenant-governor of Nova Scotia 2000–2006
  - Iona Campagnolo, 27th lieutenant-governor of British Columbia 2001–2007
  - Judy Foote, 14th lieutenant-governor of Newfoundland and Labrador, taking office in 2018
- First female commissioners of Canadian territories
  - Ione Christensen, 10th commissioner of Yukon 1979
  - Helen Maksagak, 13th commissioner of the Northwest Territories 1995–1999
  - Helen Maksagak, 1st commissioner of Nunavut 1999–2000

== People with disabilities ==
- First hearing-impaired (deaf) person elected in Canada:
  - Gary Malkowski Ontario New Democratic Party MPP York East (East York) 1990–1995
- First paraplegic person elected in Alberta:
  - Percy Wickman Alberta Liberal Party MLA Edmonton-Whitemud (1989–1993), Edmonton-Rutherford (1993–2001)
- First quadriplegic person elected to a Canadian legislature:
  - Doug Mowat British Columbia Social Credit MLA Vancouver-Little Mountain 1983–1991
- First quadriplegic person elected to the House of Commons:
  - Steven Fletcher, Conservative, Charleswood—St. James, Manitoba, 2004–2015
- First quadriplegic mayor :
  - Sam Sullivan, Mayor of Vancouver, November 2005, December 2008
- First legally blind person elected to the House of Commons:
  - J. Trevor Morgan, Progressive Conservative, St. Catharines, Ontario, 1972–1974

== Gay, lesbian, bisexual, transgender ==
- First openly gay candidates in Canada
  - Peter Maloney, candidate for Toronto Board of Education in 1972, and for Toronto City Council in 1984, 1985 and 1988
  - Ian Maclennan, candidate for Ottawa Board of Education in 1976
  - Therese Faubert, League for Socialist Action candidate in Brampton in the 1977 Ontario provincial election
  - Frank Lowery, Ontario New Democratic Party candidate in Scarborough North in the 1977 Ontario provincial election
  - Dean Haynes, candidate for Toronto City Council in 1978; withdrawn before election day
  - Jim Monk, candidate for Windsor Board of Education in 1978
  - Robert Douglas Cook, Gay Alliance Toward Equality candidate in West Vancouver-Howe Sound in the 1979 British Columbia general election
  - George Hislop, candidate for Toronto City Council in 1980; independent candidate for St. George in the 1981 Ontario general election
- First transgender-identified candidates
  - Jamie Lee Hamilton, 1996 Vancouver municipal election
  - Micheline Montreuil, 2008 federal election (nomination withdrawn before election)
  - Christin Milloy, 2011 Ontario provincial election, Ontario Libertarian Party candidate in Mississauga-Brampton South
  - Jennifer McCreath, 2015 federal election, Strength in Democracy candidate in Avalon
- First transgender-identified officeholder
  - Municipal: Julie Lemieux, municipal councillor 2013–2017, later mayor 2017–present, of Très-Saint-Rédempteur, Quebec
  - Provincial: Estefania Cortes-Vargas, Alberta MLA 2015–2019
- First openly gay MP (male):
  - Svend Robinson, New Democratic MP for Burnaby—Douglas (1979–2004), came out publicly in 1988

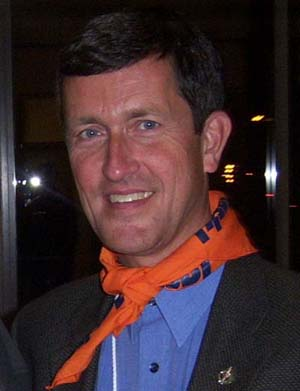
Svend Robinson, Canada's first openly gay MP

- First openly LGBT MP (female):
  - Libby Davies
- First openly two-spirit MP:
  - Blake Desjarlais
- First openly gay provincial premier (female):
  - Kathleen Wynne, Premier of Ontario (2013–2018)
- First openly gay provincial premier (male):
  - Wade MacLauchlan, Premier of Prince Edward Island (2015–2019)
- First openly gay members of provincial legislatures:
  - Maurice Richard, Quebec Liberal MNA for Nicolet (1985–89) and Nicolet-Yamaska (1989–94)
  - Ted Nebbeling, British Columbia Liberal MLA for West Vancouver-Garibaldi (1996–2005)
  - Tim Stevenson, British Columbia NDP MLA for Vancouver-Burrard (1996–2001)
  - George Smitherman, Ontario Liberal MPP for Toronto Centre (1999–2010)
  - Jim Rondeau, Manitoba NDP MLA for Assiniboia (1999–2016)
  - Gerry Rogers, Newfoundland and Labrador MHA for St. John's Centre (2011–2019)
  - Joanne Bernard, Nova Scotia MLA for Dartmouth North (2013–2017)
  - Michael Connolly and Ricardo Miranda, Alberta MLAs (2015–2019)
- First gays/lesbians to run for leadership of a major party
  - Svend Robinson, 1995 New Democratic Party leadership election—came in first on first ballot, but withdrew
  - Scott Brison, 2003 Progressive Conservative leadership election—came in third
  - Scott Brison, 2006 Liberal Party of Canada leadership election
- First openly gay leaders of political parties
  - Chris Lea, Green Party of Canada, 1990–1996
  - Allison Brewer, New Brunswick New Democratic Party, Sept 25, 2005–2006
  - André Boisclair, Parti Québécois, Nov 15, 2005–2007 (first openly gay leader of a party with seats in the legislature)
- First openly gay/lesbian senators
  - Laurier LaPierre, Liberal
  - Nancy Ruth (formerly Nancy Jackman) PC, first lesbian senator, appointed in 2006, came out in 1990
- First openly gay/lesbian cabinet ministers
  - Tim Stevenson, British Columbia, 2000–2001, first openly gay politician to be appointed to cabinet in Canada
  - André Boisclair, Quebec, 1996–2003, came out in 2000
  - Dale Eftoda, Yukon, 2000–2002, came out in 2001
  - Ted Nebbeling, British Columbia, 2001–2004
  - George Smitherman, Ontario, 2003–2009
  - Scott Brison, federal, 2004–2006
  - Jim Rondeau, Manitoba, 2004–2006
  - Kathleen Wynne, Ontario, 2006–2018
  - Jennifer Howard, Manitoba, (2009–2016)
  - Joanne Bernard, Nova Scotia, (2013–2017)
- First openly gay mayor
  - Overall: Maurice Richard, Bécancour, Quebec
  - Major city: Glen Murray, Mayor of Winnipeg (1998–2004)
- First openly gay city councillors:
  - Montreal: Raymond Blain, 1986–1993
  - Vancouver: Gordon Price, 1986–2002 (M); Ellen Woodsworth, 2002–2008 (F)
  - Winnipeg: Glen Murray, 1989–1998
  - Toronto: Kyle Rae, 1991–2010 (M); Kristyn Wong-Tam, 2010–2022 (F)
  - Ottawa: Alex Munter, 1991–2003 (M); Catherine McKenney, 2014–2022 (F)
  - Edmonton: Michael Phair, 1992–2007 (M); Sherry McKibben, 1994–1995 (F)
  - Saskatoon: Lenore Swystun, 2000–2003 (F); Darren Hill, 2006–present (M)
  - Halifax: Krista Snow, 2003–2008
  - Red Deer: Paul Harris, 2010–2017
  - Cumberland: Conner Copeman, 2011–present
  - Wabana, Bell Island: Donovan Taplin, 2013–2017
  - Hamilton: Aidan Johnson, 2014–2018
  - Prince Albert: Evert Botha, 2016–2020

== Indigenous people in Canada ==
- Year that status Indians were granted the right to vote in federal elections: 1960.
- Year that status Indians were granted the right to vote in Quebec provincial elections: 1969
- First Indigenous person elected to a legislature in Canada:
  - Solomon White, Ontario Conservative Party, 1878–1886 and 1890–1894 (first Native elected anywhere in Canada)
- First Indigenous person appointed to Canadian Senate (first Treaty Indian named a senator in Canada):
  - James Gladstone of Alberta, 1958
- First Indigenous person elected to the Canadian House of Commons (first Indigenous MP):
  - Leonard Marchand, Kamloops-Cariboo (British Columbia), Liberal Party, 1968–1979, as well as first to serve as a member of cabinet (1976)
- First Indigenous woman elected to the Parliament of Canada:
  - Ethel Blondin-Andrew, Liberal Party of Canada, Western Arctic, 1988–2006
- First Indigenous woman MLA elected in British Columbia:
  - Melanie Mark, British Columbia New Democratic Party MLA for Vancouver-Mount Pleasant, 2016–Present
- First Indigenous MLA elected in Alberta:
  - Mike Cardinal, Alberta Progressive Conservatives MLA Athabasca-Redwater 1989–2008
- First Indigenous MLA elected in Saskatchewan:
  - Lawrence Riel Yew Saskatchewan New Democratic Party MLA Cumberland, 1982–1986 and second was Keith Goulet MLA, Cumberland, 1986–2003
- First Indigenous woman MLA elected in Saskatchewan:
  - Joan Beatty, Saskatchewan New Democratic Party MLA for Cumberland, 2003 to 2009
- First Indigenous MLA elected in Manitoba
  - Pascal Breland, Independent, 1870-1874
- First Indigenous woman MLA elected in Manitoba:
  - Edith Rogers, Liberal 1920–1932
- First First Nations MLA electedin Manitoba:
  - Ken Dillen, NDP 1973-1977
- First Indigenous MPP elected in Ontario:
  - Solomon White, Ontario Conservative Party, 1878–1886 and 1890–1894
- First Indigenous MNA elected in Quebec:
  - Ludger Bastien, Quebec Conservative Party MLA for Québec-Comté 1924–1927
- First Indigenous MLA elected in New Brunswick:
  - T. J. Burke, NB Liberal MLA for Fredericton-Nashwaaksis 2006–2010
- First Indigenous MHA elected in Newfoundland and Labrador:
  - Kevin Aylward Newfoundland and Labrador Liberal MHA St. George's-Stephenville East, 1985–2003
- First Indigenous MLA elected in Yukon
  - Grafton Njootli, Progressive Conservative 1978–1982
- First Indigenous woman elected MLA in Yukon:
  - Kathie Nukon, Progressive Conservative 1982-1986, and
  - Margaret Commodore, NDP, 1982-1996 - also first First Nations woman elected to a cabinet position (1985) in Canada
- First Indigenous premier:
  - Richard Nerysoo, Northwest Territories, 1984–1985 (consensus government)
  - Paul Okalik, Nunavut, 1999–2008 (consensus government)
  - Wab Kinew, Manitoba, 2023–present
- First Indigenous speaker of a legislature:
  - Richard Nerysoo, Northwest Territories, 1989–1991
- First Indigenous leader of an official party in the Manitoba legislature:
  - Wab Kinew, Manitoba New Democratic Party, 2017–Present
- First Indigenous leader of an official party in the Newfoundland and Labrador legislature:
  - Kevin Aylward, Liberal Party of Newfoundland and Labrador, 2011
- First Métis elected to the House of Commons:
  - Pierre Delorme, Conservative, MP Provencher, Manitoba 1871–1872
- First Métis MHA elected in Newfoundland and Labrador:
  - Michael S. Martin, New Labrador, MHA Labrador South, 1972–1975
- First Métis Leader of an official party in the Newfoundland and Labrador legislature:
  - Yvonne Jones, Liberal Party of Newfoundland and Labrador, 2011
- First Inuk elected to the Canadian House of Commons (first Inuk MP):
  - Peter Ittinuar, New Democratic Party, MP Nunatsiaq, NWT 1979–1984
- First Inuk woman elected to the Canadian House of Commons (first female Inuk MP):
  - Nancy Karetak-Lindell, Liberal, MP Nunavut, 1997–2008
- First Inuk legislator elected in Canada:
  - Simonie Michael, member of the Northwest Territories Legislative Council, Eastern Arctic, 1966–1970
- First Inuk MLA elected in Manitoba:
  - George Hickes, Manitoba New Democratic Party MLA, Point Douglas, 1990–2011
- First Inuk MHA elected in Newfoundland and Labrador:
  - William Andersen III, Liberal MHA Torngat Mountains, 1993–1996
- First Inuk Premier:
  - Nellie Cournoyea, Northwest Territories, 1991–1995, (consensus government)
- First Inuk speaker of a legislature:
  - Levi Barnabas, Nunavut consensus government, Speaker 1999–2000
- First Inuk appointed to the federal cabinet:
  - Leona Aglukkaq, Conservative Party of Canada, Minister of Health, 2008.
- First Indigenous person elected mayor in British Columbia:
  - Allen Courtoreille, Chetwynd, British Columbia, October 20, 2018.

== Acadians ==
- First (Maritimes) Acadian MP:
  - Auguste Renaud, MP for Kent (1867–1872)
- First PEI Acadian MP:
  - Stanislaus Francis Perry, MP for Prince County (1874–1878)
- First Nova Scotian Acadian MP:
  - Vincent Pottier, MP for Shelburne—Yarmouth—Clare (1935–1945)
- First Maritimes Acadian female MP:
  - Pierrette Ringuette, MP for Madawaska—Victoria (1993–1997)

== Arab Canadians ==
- First Arab Canadian elected to the House of Commons (first Arab Canadian MP):
  - Pierre de Bané, MP Matane, Quebec from 1968 to 1984 (Palestinian)
- First female Arab Canadian elected to the House of Commons:
  - Maria Mourani, MP for Ahuntsic from 2006 to 2015 (Lebanese)
- First Arab Canadian premier:
  - Joe Ghiz Prince Edward Island 1986 – 25 January 1993
- First Arab Canadian in Cabinet
  - Pierre de Bané, Minister of Supply and Services 1978–1979 (Palestinian)
- First Arab Canadian leaders of political parties
  - Fonse Faour, Newfoundland New Democratic Party leader, 1980–1981
  - Joe Ghiz, Prince Edward Island Liberal Party, 1981–1993
  - Hassan Husseini, Communist Party of Ontario, 1998–2001
  - Lorraine Michael, Newfoundland New Democratic Party leader 2006–2015
- First Arab Canadian Senator:
  - Mac Harb, Liberal Senator 2003–2013

== Armenian Canadians ==
- First Armenian Canadian elected to the House of Commons (first Armenian Canadian MP):
  - Sarkis Assadourian Liberal MP (Syrian Armenian), Don Valley North, 1993–1997 and Brampton Centre, 1997–2004

== Black Canadians ==
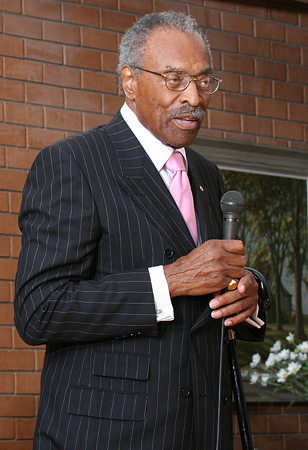
Rt. Hon Lincoln Alexander, first African-Canadian MP in Canada and the first African-Canadian Lt. Governor of Ontario

- Earliest Black Canadians elected in Canada:
  - Wilson Ruffin Abbott, Elected to Toronto city council in 1840.
  - Abraham D. Shadd, Councillor of Raleigh Township (from 1858)
  - Abner Hunt Francis, Elected as councillor of Victoria in 1865, however, he resigned after being sworn in since he was not listed on the 1863 Assessment Role.
  - Mifflin Wistar Gibbs, Councillor of Victoria (1867–1869)
  - John Waters, Town Councilor, Town of Niagara (Niagara-on-the-Lake), 1874–1876, 1877–1880
  - James W. Douglas, Victoria City, British Columbia MLA, 1875–1878 (his paternal grandmother was part Black. As well, his mother was Cree.)
  - Burr Plato, town council member, Town of Niagara Falls (from 1886);
  - William Hubbard, City of Toronto city council member (from 1894) and a member of the board of Control. To this day, by virtue of his being on the citywide elected Board of Control, the only visible minority ever elected citywide across Toronto.
- First Black MLA elected to the Legislative Assembly of Manitoba:
  - George Waldron Prout, Liberal representative for the constituency of Kildonan-St. Andrews, 1916-1920
- First Black candidate to run for the House of Commons:
  - Bill White, Spadina, CCF (the forerunner to the New Democratic Party) 1949
- First Black Canadian elected to the House of Commons:
  - Rt. Hon Lincoln Alexander, Hamilton West, Progressive Conservative MP 1968–1984
- First Black leader of a federal political party:
  - Vivian Barbot, Interim leader of the Bloc Québécois, 2011
- First Black leader of a provincial political party:
  - Stuart Parker, Leader of the Green Party of British Columbia, 1993–2000
- First Black candidate to run for the Ontario Legislature:
  - Stanley G. Grizzle, York East, ran for the Ontario CCF (the forerunner to the Ontario New Democratic Party) in the 1959 provincial general election.
- First Black Canadian elected to a Provincial Legislature in Canada:
  - James W. Douglas, Victoria City, British Columbia MLA, 1875–1878
- First Black woman elected to municipal council:
  - Virnetta Anderson, city councillor in Calgary from 1974 to 1977
- First Black woman elected in Canada:
  - Rosemary Brown Vancouver-Burrard, Burnaby-Edmonds, British Columbia New Democratic Party MLA 1972–1986

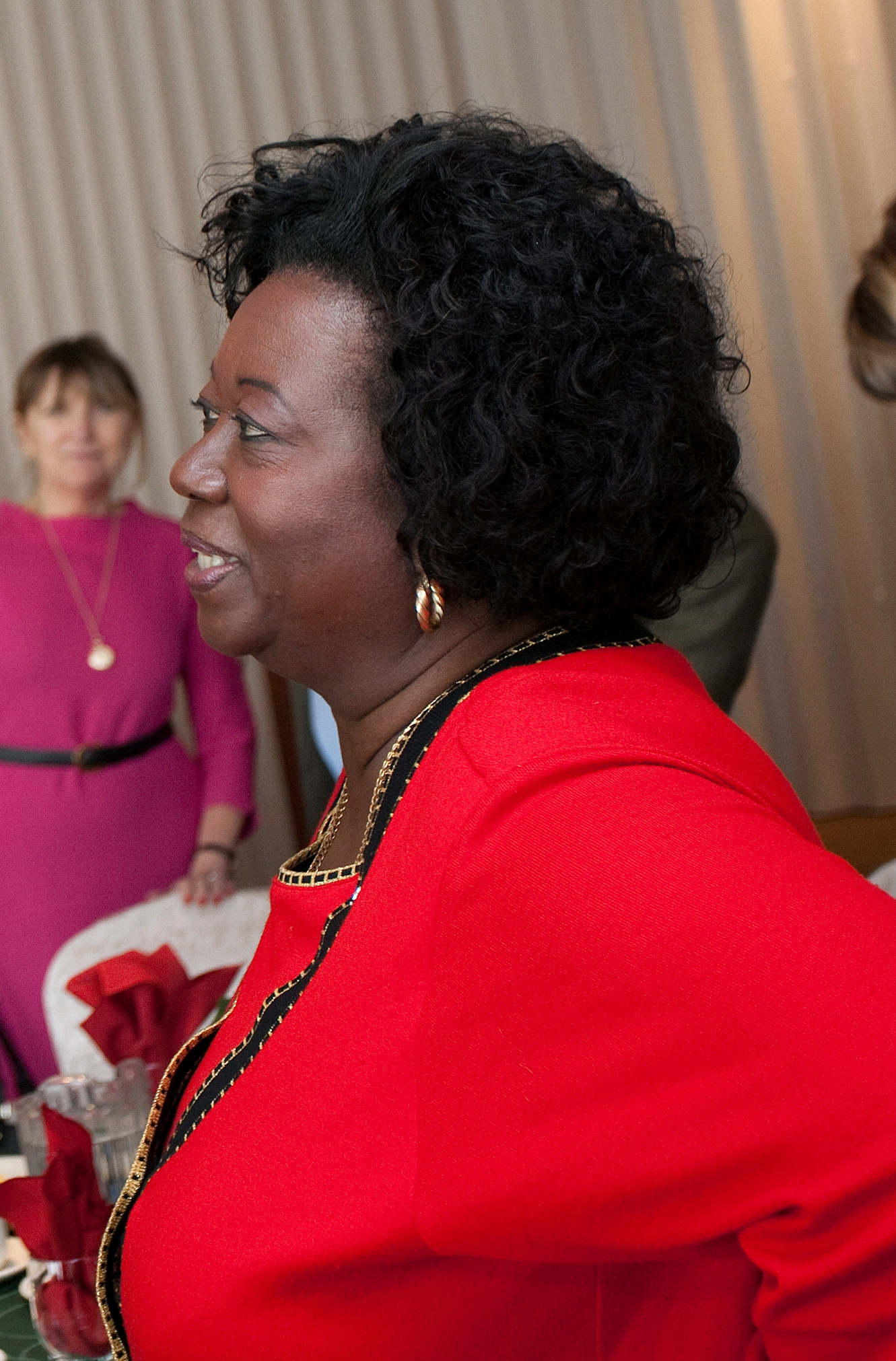
Jean Augustine, first Black woman elected to the House of Commons

- First Black woman elected to the House of Commons (first Black female MP)
  - Jean Augustine, Etobicoke—Lakeshore, Liberal MP, 1993–2006
- First Black provincial legislator:
  - Leonard Braithwaite, Etobicoke-York, Ontario Liberal MPP 1963–1975
- First Black MLA in British Columbia:
  - James W. Douglas, Victoria City, MLA 1875–1878
- First Black female MLA in
  - Canada (and British Columbia): Rosemary Brown, Vancouver-Burrard, British Columbia New Democratic Party MLA 1972–1986
- First Black MLA in Alberta:
  - George Rogers, Alberta Progressive Conservative MLA Leduc-Beaumont-Devon 2004–2015
- First Black MPP in Ontario:
  - Leonard Braithwaite, Etobicoke-York, Ontario Liberal MPP 1963–1975
- First Black female MPP in Ontario:
  - Zanana Akande, St. Andrew—St. Patrick, Ontario New Democratic Party MPP 1990–1994

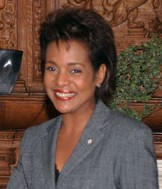
Michaëlle Jean, Canada's first Black Governor General

- First Black MNA in Quebec:
  - Jean Alfred, Papineau, Parti Québécois MNA 1976–1981
- First Black Canadian and Female City Councillor in Montreal:
  - Kettly Beauregard, Marie-Victorin, Parti Vision Montreal, 1994–2001
- First Black Canadian City Councillor in Fort Saskatchewan, Alberta:
  - Ajibola "Jibs" Abitoye, October 17, 2017
- First Black Canadian and Female City Councillor in London, Ontario:
  - Arielle Kayabaga, October 22, 2018
- First Black Female MNA in Quebec:
  - Yolande James, Nelligan, Liberal MNA 2003–present
- First Black MLA in Nova Scotia:
  - Wayne Adams, Nova Scotia Liberal MLA for Preston 1993–1998
- First Black female MLA in Nova Scotia:
  - Yvonne Atwell, Nova Scotia New Democratic Party MLA for Preston 1998–1999
- Black Speakers of Legislatures in Canada
  - Emery Barnes, British Columbia New Democratic Party MLA 1972–1996, Speaker in British Columbia Legislature 1993 to 1996 when he retired.
  - Alvin Curling, Ontario Liberal MPP 1985–2005, Speaker 2003–2005
- First Black woman in Cabinet:
  - Zanana Akande, St. Andrew—St. Patrick, Ontario New Democratic Party MPP 1990–1994
- First Black Governor General of Canada:
  - Michaëlle Jean Governor General of Canada, 2005–2010
- First Black Lieutenant Governor:
  - Rt. Hon Lincoln Alexander Lt. Governor of Ontario, 1985–1991
- first black female candidate for a Canadian federal party leadership
  - Rosemary Brown in the 1975 New Democratic Party leadership election
- First Black Senator:
  - Anne Cools, Liberal Senator 1983–2004, Conservative, 2004+
- First Black mayor:
  - Firmin Monestime, 1964
- First Black female mayor:
  - Daurene Lewis, 1984

== Chinese Canadians ==
- First Chinese-Canadian candidate in Canada:
  - Catherine Emily Ling, 1941 British Columbia provincial election for the Emancipation Party in Vancouver Point Grey
- First Chinese-Canadian MP:
  - Douglas Jung (鄭天華|鄭天華), Progressive Conservative MP for Vancouver Centre (1957–1962), first Chinese Canadian to hold elected office
- First Chinese-Canadian member of provincial legislature:
  - George Ho Lem (何榮禧), Alberta Social Credit MLA for Calgary-McCall (1971–75)
  - Bob Wong (黄景培), Ontario Liberal MPP for Fort York (1987–90)
  - Ida Chong (張杏芳), British Columbia Liberal MLA for Oak Bay-Gordon Head (1996–2013), together with Jenny Kwan were the first Chinese-Canadian women elected in Canada
  - Jenny Kwan (關慧貞|關慧貞), British Columbia NDP MLA for Vancouver-Mount Pleasant (1996–2015), together with Ida Chong were the first Chinese-Canadian women elected in Canada
- First Taiwanese-Canadian MP:
  - Meili Faille, Bloc Québécois MP for Vaudreuil—Soulanges (2004–2011)

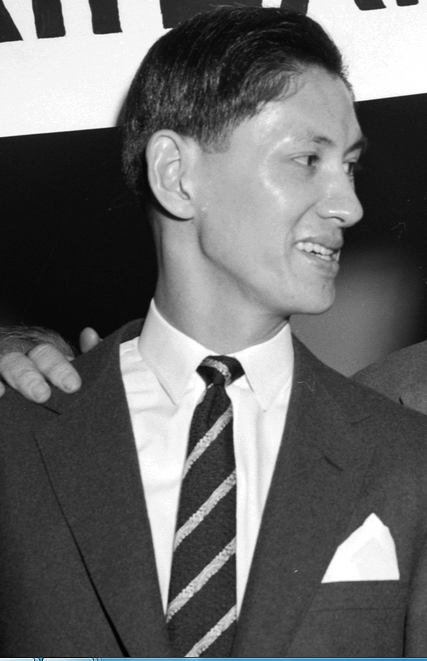
Douglas Jung, Canada's first Chinese MP

- First Chinese-Canadian leader of a political party (federally or provincially)
  - Arthur Lee (李僑棟), British Columbia Liberal leader, 1984–1987 (the British Columbia Liberals had no seats)
  - Victor Lau, Saskatchewan Green Party Leader 2006 (interim), 2011–present
- First Chinese-Canadian in Cabinet:
  - Bob Wong (黄景培), Ontario Liberal, Minister of Energy and Infrastructure (1987–89), Minister of Citizenship (1989–90)
  - Raymond Chan (陳卓愉|陳卓愉), Federal Liberal, Secretary of State (Asia-Pacific) (1993–2001), Minister of State (Multiculturalism)(2004–2006), First Chinese-Canadian federal cabinet minister
  - Gary Mar (馬健威), Alberta Progressive Conservative, Minister of International and Intergovernmental Relations, Minister of Health and Wellness, Minister of Learning, Minister of the Environment, and twice Minister of Community Development (1993–2007)
  - Jenny Kwan (關慧貞|關慧貞), British Columbia NDP, Minister of Municipal Affairs (1998–99), Minister of Women's Equality (1999–2000), Minister of Community Development, Cooperatives and Volunteers (2000–01)
  - Michael Chong (莊文浩|莊文浩), Federal Conservative, Minister of Intergovernmental Affairs and President of the Queen's Privy Council for Canada (2006)
  - Michael Chan, Ontario Liberal, Minister of Revenue (2007), Minister of Citizenship and Immigration (2007–2018)
  - Alice Wong (黃陳小萍|黃陳小萍), Federal Conservative, Minister of State for Seniors (2011–2021)
- First Chinese-Canadian senator:
  - Vivienne Poy (利德蕙|利德蕙), 1998–2012
- First Chinese-Canadian governor general of Canada:
  - Adrienne Clarkson (伍冰枝|伍冰枝), Governor General of Canada, 1999–2005
- First Chinese-Canadian lieutenant governors
  - David Lam (林思齊|林思齊), British Columbia Lieutenant Governor 1988–1995
  - Norman Kwong (林佐民|林佐民), Lieutenant Governor of Alberta 2005–2010
  - Philip S. Lee (李紹麟|李紹麟), Lieutenant Governor of Manitoba
- First Chinese-Canadian mayor in Canada:
  - Peter Wing (吳榮添), Mayor of Kamloops, first elected 1966, served for three terms

== Croatian Canadians ==
- First Croatian Canadian elected to a Legislature:
  - David Stupich, British Columbia MLA, Nanaimo and the Islands, 1963–1969, Nanaimo 1972–1988
- First Croatian-born Canadian elected to a Legislature:
  - John Sola, Ontario Liberal MPP, Mississauga East, 1987–1993 (expelled), Independent MPP 1993–1995
- First Croatian Canadian elected to the House of Commons (first Croatian Canadian MP):
  - David Stupich, New Democratic Party MP, Nanaimo—Cowichan, 1988–1993
- First Croatian-born Canadian elected to the House of Commons:
  - Janko Peric, Liberal MP, Cambridge, 1993–2004

== Czech Canadians ==
- First Czech Canadian MP:
  - Otto Jelinek PC MP 1972–1979 High Park-Humber Valley, 1979–1993 Halton
- First Czech Canadian cabinet minister:
  - Otto Jelinek, 1984–1993

== Dutch Canadians ==
- First Dutch-born Canadians elected to the House of Commons:
  - Simon De Jong, NDP MP for Regina East, 1979–1997
  - John Oostrom, PC MP for Willowdale 1984–1988
  - Peter Stoffer, NDP MP for Sackville-Eastern Shore, 1997–2015
- First Dutch-born Canadian Senator:
  - Roméo Dallaire, 2005–2014
- First Dutch-born Canadian Provincial Premier:
  - Bill Vander Zalm, Social Credit Premier for British Columbia, 1986–1991

== Filipino Canadians ==
Conrad Santos, First Filipino Canadian elected in Canada

- First Filipino elected in Canada:
  - Conrad Santos, Manitoba New Democratic Party MLA Burrows 1981–1988, Broadway 1990–1999, Wellington 1999–2007
- First Filipino Canadian Woman elected in Canada:
  - Flor Marcelino, Manitoba NDP MLA Wellington 2007–present
- First Filipino Canadian elected to the House of Commons (first Filipino Canadian MP):
  - Dr. Rey Pagtakhan, Winnipeg North, Liberal MP, 1988–2004
- First Filipino Canadian elected in Manitoba:
  - Conrad Santos, Manitoba New Democratic Party MLA Burrows 1981–1988, Broadway 1990–1999, Wellington 1999–present
- First Filipino Canadian Woman elected in Manitoba:
  - Flor Marcelino, Manitoba NDP MLA Wellington 2007–present
- First Filipino Canadian appointed to the Federal Cabinet:
  - Dr. Rey Pagtakhan, Secretary of State (Asia-Pacific) (2001–2002), Minister of Veterans Affairs (2002–2003), Secretary of State (Science, Research and Development) (2002–2003), Minister with political responsibility for Manitoba (2002–2003), Minister of Western Economic Diversification (2003–2004)
- First Filipino Canadian to run for the leadership of a major party:
  - Conrad Santos, Manitoba New Democratic Party leadership 1988

== German Canadians ==
- First German Canadian prime minister of Canada:
  - John Diefenbaker, 1957–1963
- First German Canadian governor general of Canada:
  - Edward Schreyer, 1979–1984
- First German Canadian Provincial Premier:
  - Edward Schreyer, Premier of Manitoba, 1969–1977

== Greek Canadians ==
- First Greek Canadian elected to the House of Commons (first Greek Canadian MP):
  - Gus Mitges, Progressive Conservative MP, Grey—Simcoe 1972–1993
- First Greek Canadian Senator:
  - Philippe Gigantès, Liberal Senator appointed in 1984
- First Greek elected to the Ontario legislature:
  - George Samis, Ontario New Democratic Party MPP 1974 by-election, 1985, Cornwall
- First Greek Minister in the Province of Nova Scotia:
  - Labi Kousoulis, Nova Scotia Liberal Party MLA, 2013–present

== Hungarian Canadians ==
- First Hungarian Canadian elected to the House of Commons (first Hungarian Canadian MP):
  - Tom Wappel, Liberal MP, Scarborough West 1988–2000; renamed Scarborough Southwest 2000–2008
- First Hungarian-born Canadian elected to the House of Commons:
  - Andrew Telegdi, Liberal MP Waterloo, 1993–2008

== Icelandic Canadians ==
- First Icelandic-Canadian elected to a legislature in Canada:
  - Sigtryggur Jonasson, Manitoba Liberal Party, 1896–1899, 1907–1910
- First Icelandic-Canadian Provincial Party Leader:
  - Boss Johnson, British Columbia Liberal Party, 1947–1952
- First Icelandic-Canadian premier:
  - Boss Johnson, British Columbia Liberal Party, 1947–1952

== Indian Canadians ==
- First Indian-Canadian elected as mayor, Municipal government in Ontario:
  - Floyd Pinto, Mayor of Township of Adjala-Tosorontio, Province of Ontario 2018-2022
- First Indian-Canadian elected as mayor in Simcoe County:
  - Floyd Pinto, Mayor of Township of Adjala-Tosorontio, County of Simcoe 2018-2022
- First Indian-Canadian elected as Simcoe County Councillor:
  - Floyd Pinto, Simcoe County Councillor, 2018-2022

== Iranian Canadians ==
- First Iranian Canadian elected to the Legislative Assembly of Ontario (1st Iranian Canadian Provincial MPP)
  - Reza Moridi, Liberal MPP, Richmond Hill, 2007–2018
- First Iranian Canadian elected to the Canadian House of Commons (1st Iranian Canadian MPs)
  - Ali Ehsassi, Liberal MP, Willowdale, 2015–present
  - Majid Jowhari, Liberal MP, Richmond Hill, 2015–present
- First Iranian Canadian elected to the Québec National Assembly (1st Iranian Canadian MNA)
  - Amir Khadir, Québec Solidaire MNA, Mercier, 2008–present. Also the first Iranian-Canadian co-spokesperson of a major provincial political party

== Italian Canadians ==
- First Italian Canadian to a provincial legislature
  - Phil Gaglardi, 1952=1968, also first cabinet minister of Italian origin 1955 onwards
- First Italian Canadian Elected to the House of Commons (1st Italian Canadian MP)
  - Hubert Badanai Liberal MP Fort William 1958–1972
- First Italian Canadian Cabinet Minister (Federal)
  - Monique Bégin, 1976.09.14 Appointed Minister of National Revenue
- First Italian Canadian Senator
  - Pietro Rizzuto, Liberal Senator appointed in 1976
- First Italian Canadian to run for the leadership of a major party (federally or provincially):
  - John Nunziata, Federal Liberal Leadership race 1990
  - Phil Gaglardi, provincial British Columbia Social Credit League leadership race 1952
  - Tony Silipo, Ontario NDP leadership race 1996
  - Greg Sorbara, Ontario Liberal leadership race 1992
- First Italian Canadian provincial party leader
  - Steven Del Duca, Ontario Liberal (2020–2022)

== Japanese Canadians ==
- First Japanese Canadian candidate in Canada:
  - Joan Kabayama, Grenville—Carleton New Democratic Party 1972 federal election
- First Japanese Canadian elected to the House of Commons (first Japanese Canadian MP):
  - Bev Oda, Conservative MP, Clarington—Scugog—Uxbridge, 2004–2012
- First Japanese Canadian elected to the Ontario Provincial Parliament (first Japanese Canadian MPP):
  - David Tsubouchi, Progressive Conservative, Markham, 1995–2003
- First Japanese Canadian elected to the British Columbia Legislature (first Japanese Canadian MLA):
  - Naomi Yamamoto, BC Liberal Party, North Vancouver-Lonsdale, 2009–2017
- First Japanese Canadian elected to the Alberta Legislature:
  - Rob Miyashiro, Alberta New Democratic Party, Lethbridge-West, 2024–present

== Jewish Canadians ==
- Extended full political rights:
  - 1831, in Lower Canada (Quebec)
- First Jewish Canadian elected to a Legislature in Canada:
  - Ezekiel Hart, elected in Lower Canada in the by-election of April 11, 1807
- First Jewish Canadian cabinet minister (provincial or federal):
  - David Croll, Ontario Liberal, Ontario Cabinet of Premier Mitchell Hepburn, 1934–1937
- First Jewish Canadian federal cabinet minister:
  - Herb Gray, Liberal, first appointed in 1969 as minister without portfolio by Pierre Trudeau (Liberal)

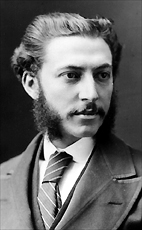
Henry Nathan, Canada's First Jewish MP

- First Jewish Canadians elected to the Canadian House of Commons (first Jewish Canadian MP)
  - Henry Nathan Jr., Liberal MP Victoria 1872–1874
  - A. A. Heaps, CCF (the forerunner to the New Democratic Party) MP, Winnipeg North 1935–1940
  - Fred Rose, Labor-Progressive (Communist) MP Cartier, Quebec 1943–1947
- First Jewish leader of a federal party:
  - David Lewis, New Democratic Party 1971–1975
- First Jewish premiers
  - Dave Barrett, British Columbia New Democratic Party premier 1972–1975
  - Tom Marshall, Newfoundland and Labrador Progressive Conservative Party, January 24, 2014 – September 26, 2014
- First Jewish Senator:
  - David Croll, Liberal, appointed 1955.
- First Jewish Leaders of provincial parties
  - Dave Barrett, British Columbia New Democratic Party, 1969 – May 20, 1984
  - Stephen Lewis, Ontario New Democratic Party, 1970–1978
  - Izzy Asper, Manitoba Liberal, 1970–75
  - Sidney Spivak, Manitoba Progressive Conservatives, 1971 to 1975
  - Stuart Smith, Ontario Liberal 1976–1982
  - Larry Grossman, Ontario Progressive Conservatives, November 22, 1985 – September 10, 1987
  - Tom Marshall interim, NL Progressive Conservative Party, January 24, 2014 – September 26, 2014
- First Jewish Supreme Court Judge:
  - Bora Laskin, 1970, subsequently Chief Justice
- First Jewish mayors
  - Lumley Franklin, Victoria, 1865–1866
  - David Oppenheimer, Vancouver, 1888–1891
  - David Croll, Windsor, 1931–1934
  - Leonard Arthur Kitz, Halifax, 1955–1957
  - Nathan Phillips, Toronto, 1955–1962
  - Vernon Singer, North York (Reeve), 1957–1958
  - Sidney Buckwold, Saskatoon, 1958–1963
  - Max Silverman, Sudbury, 1966
  - Sam Katz, Winnipeg, 2004–2014
  - Stephen Mandel, Edmonton, 2004–2013
  - Michael Applebaum, Montreal, 2012

== Korean Canadians ==
- First Korean Canadian candidates in Canada
  - Dr. David Kho, Ontario New Democratic Party, 1987 provincial election Scarborough—Agincourt
  - Raymond Cho, New Democratic Party, 1988 federal election, Scarborough—Rouge River
- First Korean Canadian elected to Parliament: Nelly Shin, British Columbia
- First Korean-Canadian elected to a legislature:
  - Sandy Lee, Northwest Territories
- First Korean-Canadian to hold federal public office:
  - Yonah Martin (Kim), Conservative, Senator, 2009–present

== Latvian Canadians ==
- First Latvian Canadian MP:
  - Sarmite Bulte, Liberal MP Parkdale—High Park, 1997–2006

== Macedonian Canadians ==
- First Macedonian Canadian MP
  - Lui Temelkovski, Liberal MP Oak Ridges-Markham 2004–2008

== Maltese Canadians ==
- First Maltese Canadian MP
  - Sue Barnes, Liberal MP London West 1993–2008

== Muslim Canadians ==
- First Canadian Muslim Cabinet Minister
  - Maryam Monsef, Minister of Democratic Institutions since November 2015.
- First Canadian Muslim Senator
  - Mobina Jaffer, one of the six senators for British Columbia since 2001.
- First Canadian Muslim MP
  - Rahim Jaffer, Reform MP for Edmonton Strathcona from 1997 till 2008.
- First Female Canadian Muslim MP
  - Yasmin Ratansi, Liberal MP for Don Valley East from 2004 till 2011 and 2015
- First Muslim MLA (Alberta) and Cabinet Minister
  - Larry Shaben, Alberta Progressive Conservative MLA for Lesser Slave Lake from 1975 till 1989. One of the first Muslims elected to higher political office in North America. Was the Minister of Utilities and Telephones from 1979 to 1982; the Minister of Housing (1982–1986) and Minister of Economic Development and Trade (1986–1989)
- First Canadian Muslim MPP (Ontario)
  - Khalil Ramal, Liberal MPP for London-Fanshawe from 2003 till 2011
  - Shafiq Qaadri, Liberal MPP for Etobicoke North from 2003 till 2018
- First Canadian Muslim president of a provincial political party
  - Yasir Naqvi, President of the Ontario Liberal Party from 2009 – ?
- First Canadian Muslim Mayor
  - Naheed Nenshi, Mayor of Calgary since 2010.

== Norwegian Canadians ==
- First Norwegian elected to a legislature in Canada
  - Hans Lars Helgesen, 1878–1886, Esquimalt, British Columbia MLA, first Scandinavian-Canadian member of a provincial legislature

== Polish Canadians ==
- First Polish Canadians elected to the House of Commons (first Polish Canadian MPs)
  - Alexandre-Édouard Kierzkowski, St. Hyacinthe, Quebec, Liberal MP, 1867–1872
  - Fred Rose, Labor-Progressive (Communist) MP 1943–1947, from Cartier, Quebec

== Portuguese Canadians ==
- First Portuguese Canadian elected to the House of Commons
  - John Rodriguez, Nickel Belt, New Democratic Party MP, 1974–1980, 1984–1993 (Guyanese Portuguese)

== Russian Canadians ==
- Russian Canadian leader of the opposition and leader of a major federal political party:
  - Michael Ignatieff, Liberal Party of Canada, 2008–2011

== Slovak Canadians ==
- First Slovak Canadian to run for the leadership of a major party:
  - Peter Kormos, Ontario New Democratic Party leadership 1996

== South Asian Canadians ==
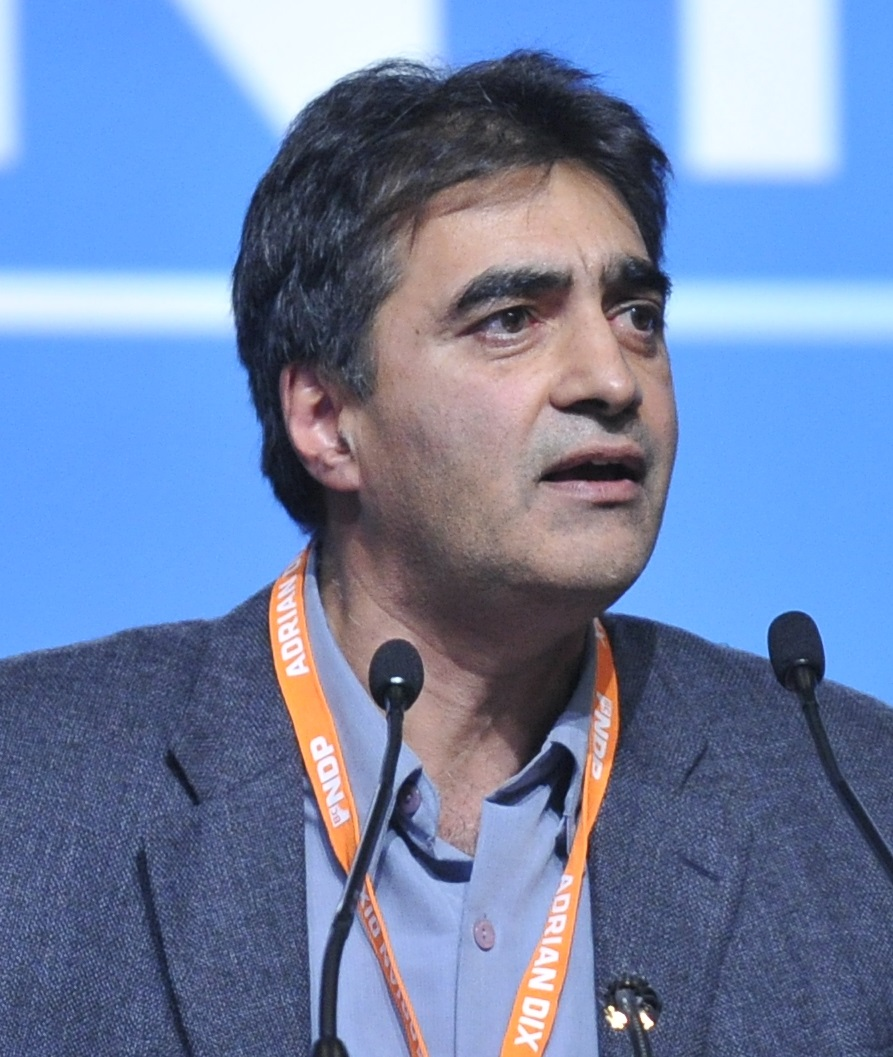
Moe Sihota, first South Asian Canadian elected to provincial parliament in Canada

- Note: South Asians include those of Indian, Pakistani, Sri Lankan, Nepalese, or Bangladeshi ancestry.
- First South Asian elected in Canada:
  - Naranjan Grewall, City Councilor Mission, 1950 (Punjabi-Canadian)
  - Naranjan Grewall, Mayor Mission, 1954
  - Johnder Basran, Mayor Lillooet, early 1960s (Punjabi-Canadian)
- First South Asian candidate in British Columbia:
  - Naranjan Grewall, British Columbia, Dewdney, CCF Party of British Columbia, 1956 provincial election
- First South Asian Canadian candidate in Canada:
  - Hardial Bains, Marxist–Leninist Party of Canada, Eglinton, 1972 federal election
- First South Asian Provincial Premier:
  - Ujjal Dosanjh, British Columbia New Democratic Party, February 24, 2000, to June 5, 2001 (Punjabi-Canadian)
- First South Asian Territorial Premier:
  - Ranj Pillai, Yukon Liberal Party, January 28, 2023 – present (Malayali-Canadian)
- First South Asian leaders of a major political party:
  - Raj Pannu, Alberta New Democratic Party February 2, 2000 – 2004 (MLA 1997–2008) (Punjabi-Canadian)

Note: Hardial Bains was the first South Asian Canadian to lead a political party. He founded and led the Marxist–Leninist Party of Canada from 1970 to 1997

- First South Asians elected to the House of Commons:
  - Gurbax Singh Malhi, Bramalea—Gore—Malton, Liberal MP 1993–2011 (Punjabi-Canadian)
  - Jag Bhaduria, Markham—Whitchurch—Stouffville, Liberal MP 1993–1997,
  - Herb Dhaliwal, Vancouver South, Liberal MP 1993–2003 (Punjabi-Canadian),
  - Hedy Fry, Vancouver Centre, Liberal MP 1993–present (Indo-Caribbean)
- First South Asian elected in Official Opposition of Canada:
  - Gurmant Grewal, M.P. Surrey Central 1997, as the deputy opposition house leader was the first Indo-Canadian appointed the officer of the house. He was also the first chairman of a joint committee of the House and Senate for Scrutiny of Regulations in 1998.
- First South Asian female MPs:
  - Hedy Fry, Vancouver Centre, Liberal MP 1993+ (Indo-Caribbean)
- First South Asian Sikh and Punjabi female MPs:
  - Ruby Dhalla, Brampton—Springdale, Conservative MP 2004–2011 (Indo-Canadian)
  - Nina Grewal, Fleetwood—Port Kells, Conservative MP 2004–2015 (Indo-Canadian)
- First South Asian MLA elected in British Columbia:
  - Moe Sihota, British Columbia New Democratic Party MLA, Esquimalt-Port Renfrew 1986–1991, Esquimalt-Metchosin, 1991–2001 (Punjabi-Canadian)
- First South Asian elected as mayor in Ontario:
- First South Asian Indian-Canadian elected as mayor, Municipal government in Ontario:
  - Floyd Pinto, Mayor of Township of Adjala-Tosorontio, Province of Ontario 2018-2022
- First South Asian Indian-Canadian elected as mayor in Simcoe County:
  - Floyd Pinto, Mayor of Township of Adjala-Tosorontio, County of Simcoe 2018-2022
- First South Asian Indian-Canadian elected as Simcoe County Councillor:
  - Floyd Pinto, Simcoe County Councillor, 2018-2022

- First South Asian MLA elected in Manitoba:
  - Gulzar Singh Cheema, Manitoba Liberal MLA Kildonan 1988–1990 (Punjabi-Canadian)
- First South Asian MPP elected in Ontario:
  - Murad Velshi, Ontario Liberal MPP Don Mills 1987–1990
- First South Asian MLA elected in Nova Scotia:
  - Leonard Preyra, Nova Scotia NDP MLA Halifax Citadel 2006–2013
- First South Asian School Board Trustee elected in Canada:
  - Neethan Shan, York Region District School Board 2006–present
- South Asian Canadian Senators
  - Mobina Jaffer, Liberal Senator, 2001–present
- South Asian presidents, vice presidents and secretaries of political parties
  - Sav Dhaliwal, president of the British Columbia NDP (2009) (Punjabi-Canadian)
  - Raj Sharan, former president of the Newfoundland and Labrador New Democratic Party

=== Tamil Canadians ===
- First Tamil-Canadian candidate to run for the House of Commons:
  - Joseph Thevarkunnel, NDP candidate in 2000 federal election for Oak Ridges
- First Tamil-Canadian candidate to run in Ontario
  - Chandran Mylvaganam, NDP Candidate in 1993 by-election in Don Mills
- First Tamil-Canadian elected in Canada
  - Logan Kanapathi, elected Councillor for Ward 7 in Markham, Ontario in 2006 and one of the first two to be elected as MPP in 2018
  - Neethan Shan, elected York School Board Trustee for Markham Wards 7 and 8
- First Tamil-Canadian Female elected in Canada
  - Juanita Nathan, elected York School Board Trustee for Markham Wards 7 and 8
- First Tamil-Canadian and Tamil Female elected House of Commons
  - Rathika Sitsabaiesan, elected Member of Parliament for Scarborough-Rouge River, Ontario from 2011 to 2015

== Turkish Canadians ==
- First Turkish Canadian MP
  - Sima Acan, Liberal MP Oakville West 2025–present

== Ukrainian Canadians ==
- First Ukrainian Canadian elected to a Legislature in Canada:
  - Andrew Shandro, Alberta Liberal Party MLA from Whitford, Alberta, 1913–1922
- First Ukrainian Canadian elected to the House of Commons (first Ukrainian Canadian MP):
  - Michael Luchkovich, United Farmers/CCF MP from Vegreville, Alberta, 1926–1935
- First Ukrainian Canadian Senator:
  - William Michael Wall, Liberal Senator from Manitoba, 1955–1962
- First Ukrainian Canadian cabinet minister:
  - Michael Starr, federal Progressive Conservative, Minister of Labour, 1957–1963
- First Ukrainian Canadian leader of a major political party:
  - Roy Romanow, Saskatchewan New Democratic Party leader 1987–2001
- First Ukrainian Canadian premier:
  - Roy Romanow, NDP premier of Saskatchewan, 1990–2001
- First Ukrainian Canadian governor general of Canada:
  - Ray Hnatyshyn, 1990–1995
- First Ukrainian Canadian mayor
  - William Hawrelak 1951–1959, 1963–1965, 1974–1975
  - Stephen Juba Winnipeg 1954–1977

== Vietnamese Canadians ==
- First Vietnamese Canadian elected to a legislature in Canada:
  - Hung Pham, Alberta Progressive Conservative MLA, Calgary-Montrose 1993–2008
- First Vietnamese Canadian MP:
  - Ève-Mary Thaï Thi Lac, Bloc Québécois MP, Saint-Hyacinthe—Bagot 2007–2011
  - Hoang Mai, New Democratic Party MP, Brossard—La Prairie 2011–2015
  - Anne Minh-Thu Quach, New Democratic Party MP, Beauharnois—Salaberry 2011–2019
- First Vietnamese Canadian deputy speaker of the legislature in Canada:
  - Wayne Cao 2008-2015

== Elections ==
- First election where a majority of women were able to vote: 1921 Canadian federal election
- First election where one party won every seat: 1935 Prince Edward Island general election
- First mail-in-only election: 2021 Newfoundland and Labrador general election

== See also ==
- Women in Canadian politics
- List of visible minority politicians in Canada
- List of electoral firsts in New Zealand
- List of electoral firsts in the United Kingdom
