= Bowinn Ma =

Canadian politician

Bowinn Ma MLA
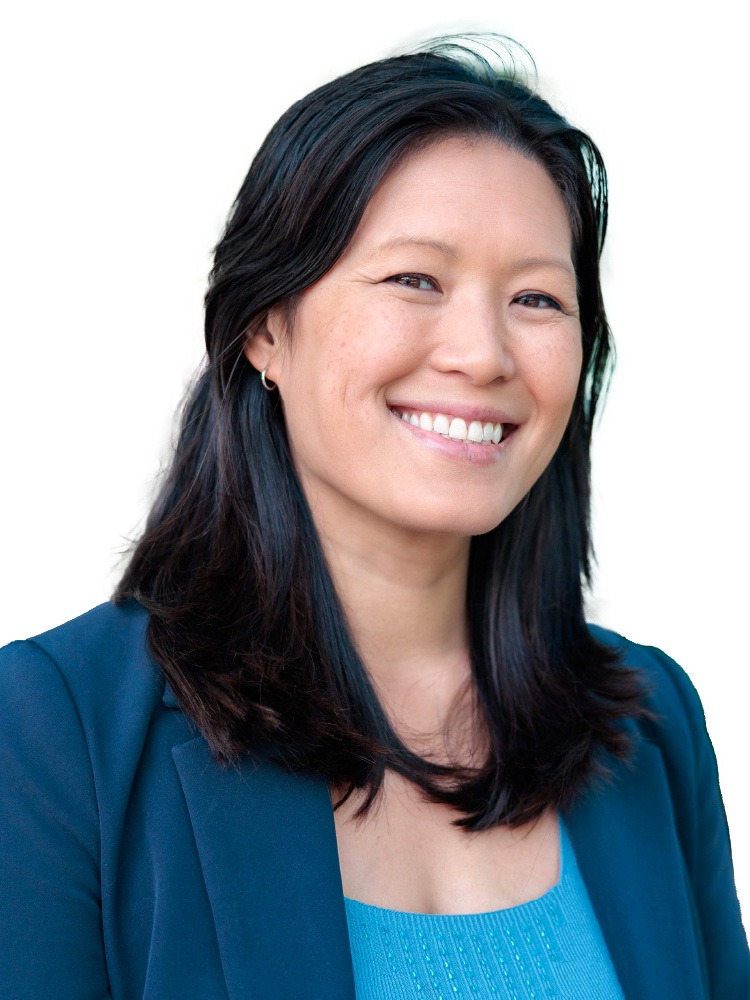
- Campaign portrait, 2024

Minister of Infrastructure of British Columbia
- In office November 18, 2024 – November 20, 2026
- Premier: David Eby
- Preceded by: Office established
- Succeeded by: Trevor Halford

Minister of Emergency Management and Climate Readiness of British Columbia
- In office December 7, 2022 – November 18, 2024
- Premier: David Eby
- Preceded by: Position established
- Succeeded by: Kelly Greene

Minister of State for Infrastructure of British Columbia
- In office November 26, 2020 – December 7, 2022
- Premier: John Horgan; David Eby
- Preceded by: Position established
- Succeeded by: Dan Coulter

Parliamentary Secretary for TransLink of British Columbia
- In office July 18, 2017 – November 26, 2020
- Premier: John Horgan
- Preceded by: Position established
- Succeeded by: Position abolished

Member of the British Columbia Legislative Assembly for North Vancouver-Lonsdale
- Incumbent
- Assumed office May 9, 2017
- Preceded by: Naomi Yamamoto

Personal details
- Born: July 25, 1985 (age 41) Kitchener-Waterloo, Ontario, Canada
- Party: BC NDP
- Education: University of British Columbia (BASc) Sauder School of Business
- Profession: Engineer

Bowinn Ma
- Traditional Chinese: 馬博文
- Simplified Chinese: 马博文
Transcriptions
Standard Mandarin
- Hanyu Pinyin: Mǎ Bówén

Bowinn Ma MLA is a Canadian politician who has served as a member of the Legislative Assembly of British Columbia (MLA) representing the electoral district of North Vancouver-Lonsdale since 2017. She is a member of the New Democratic Party.

Ma served as the Minister of Infrastructure, a new position in the Eby ministry created to deliver vertical capital projects for the provincial government. She previously served in the Eby ministry as BC's first Minister for Emergency Management and Climate Readiness. In the Horgan ministry following the 2020 election, Ma was the Minister of State for Infrastructure, a position that served under the Minister of Transportation and Infrastructure, and also served on the Treasury Board. Minister Ma's mandate included specific TransLink SkyTrain expansion projects, the Massey Tunnel replacement and completing the Pattullo Bridge. From 2017 to 2020, Ma served as the Parliamentary Secretary for TransLink, as a member of the Cabinet Housing Working Group Committee, as a member of the Select Standing Committee on Public Accounts, and as the Chair of the Select Standing Committee on Crown Corporations.

In November 2023, Ma became the third woman in BC history to give birth as a sitting cabinet minister, and the 14th in Canada. In July 2026, Ma became the first woman in BC history to give birth as a sitting cabinet minister twice.

On June 27, 2025, an explosive device was detonated outside her constituency office, with no injuries reported.

== Personal life ==
Ma graduated from the University of British Columbia in 2008 with a Bachelor of Applied Science degree in civil engineering, which included a focus in transportation, and then from the UBC Sauder School of Business in 2009 with a Master of Management degree. She is currently a Professional Engineer registered with the Association of Professional Engineers and Geoscientists of British Columbia as well as a Project Management Professional. She served as an engineer and project manager at Vancouver International Airport prior to the 2017 election.

Prior to becoming involved in provincial politics, Ma led grassroots efforts against Bill C-51 after publicly challenging Justin Trudeau on his support for the bill during a public Q&A event at the University of British Columbia.

Ma was the fourth female president of the UBC Engineers and led the reform of the organization. Created in 2008, the Engineering Undergraduate Society of the University of British Columbia awards the "Bowinn Ma Award" annually "in recognition of exceptional dedication, service and self-sacrifice by one or more graduating undergraduate engineering students in completing their duties, both within and beyond the purview of their position(s) in the Engineering community".

Ma is the Canadian-born daughter of Taiwanese immigrants and lives in North Vancouver with her husband and two children, Azalea and Jack.

== Provincial politics ==
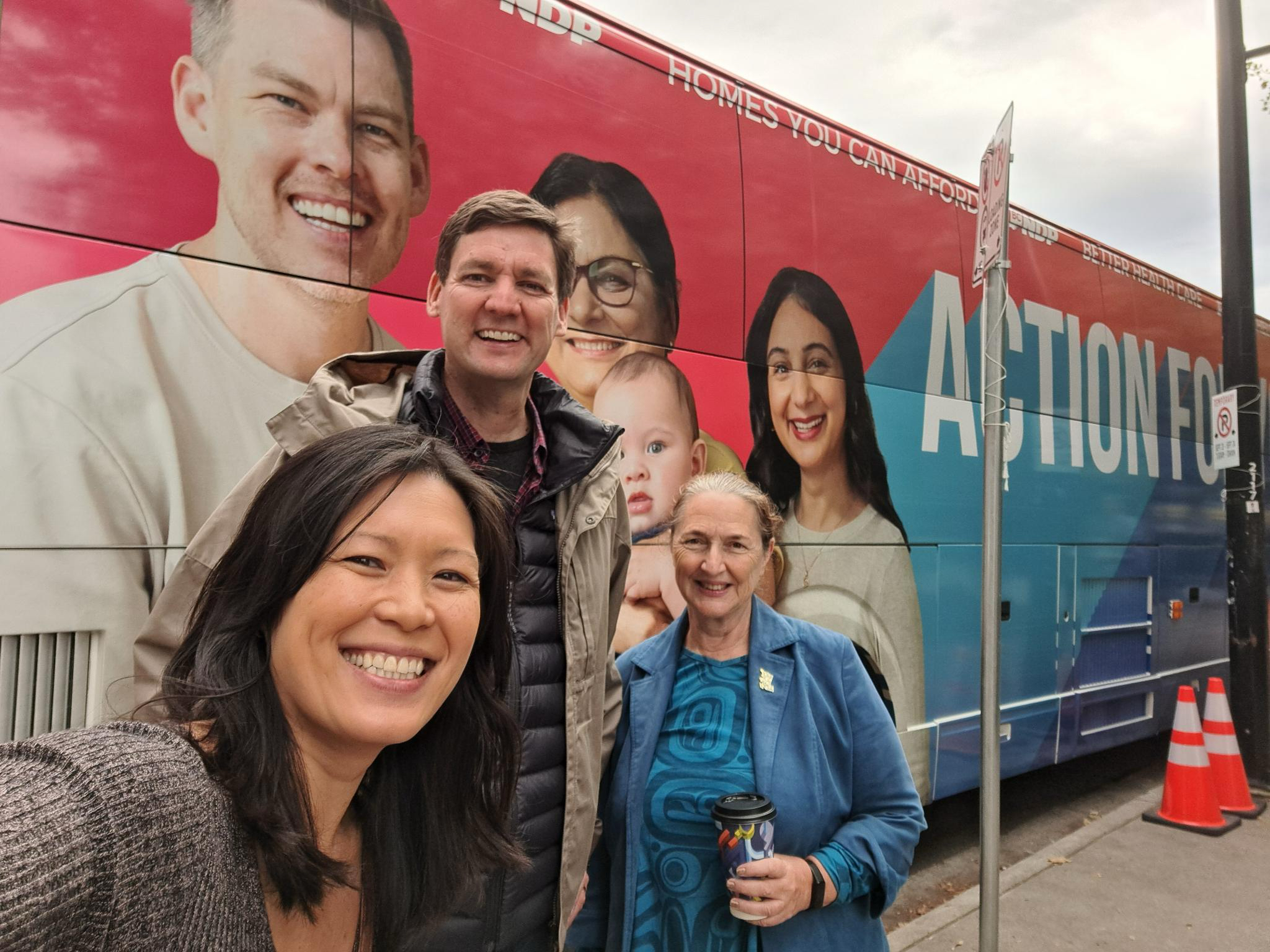
Bowinn Ma with BC NDP Leader David Eby during 2024 election

Upon being elected as MLA for North Vancouver-Lonsdale, Ma created the Bowinn Ma MLA Social Justice Scholarship: three $500 community scholarships, awarded to one graduating high school student each from Carson Graham Secondary, Sutherland Secondary and the Squamish Nation. The scholarship is aimed at graduating high school students enrolled in a post-secondary institution who have demonstrated a commitment to social justice and overcome barriers or disadvantages in their life.

From 2017 to 2020, Ma was the youngest member of the current British Columbia Legislative Assembly, and the Canadian born daughter of Taiwanese immigrants. Ma, Katrina Chen, and Anne Kang are the first MLAs of Taiwanese heritage to be elected to the Legislative Assembly of British Columbia.

Ma was the first New Democrat to win a seat on the North Shore since David Schreck in 1991. She defeated two-term incumbent BC Liberal Minister Naomi Yamamoto as a first-time candidate. The North Vancouver-Lonsdale upset result is often credited in part to increased turnout from Squamish Nation voters and the political mobilization of the Iranian-Canadian community, both of whom strongly favoured Ma.

In 2018, Ma made headlines for her #MeToo statement in the BC Legislature voicing support for Christine Blasey Ford's experience during the Brett Kavanaugh hearings and then again in early 2019 when she openly discussed her past experience with an eating disorder for Provincial Eating Disorder Awareness Week.

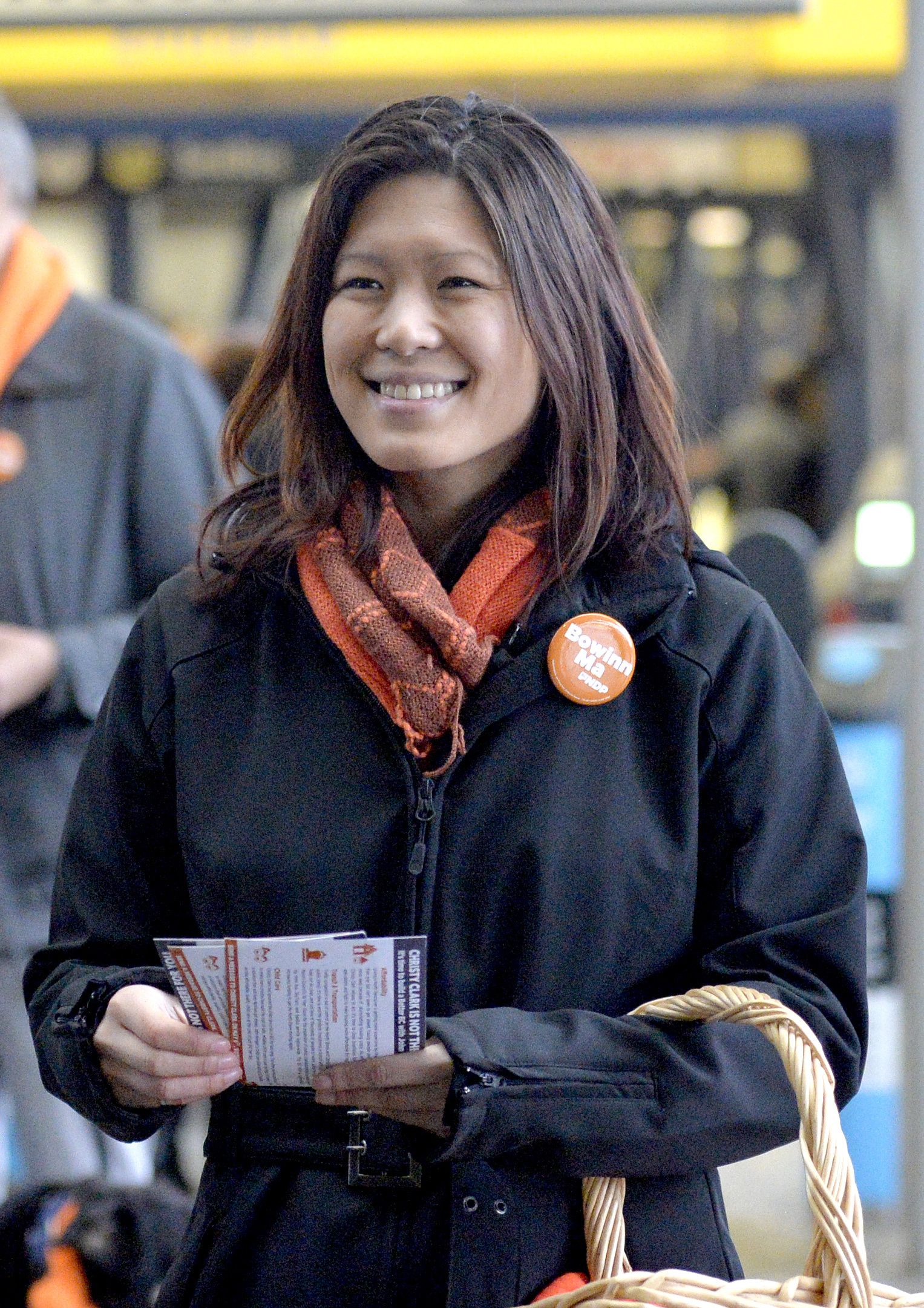
Bowinn Ma in 2017.

MLA Ma was first offered a ministerial role as 'Minister of Citizenship Services', in early 2020, still during her first term in office. However, she reluctantly declined the offer to focus on her work as a local MLA.

Ma in the 2020 British Columbia general election won a personal endorsement from the former Green Party of British Columbia leader Andrew Weaver early in the campaign. In the words of Weaver, "There are few elected officials who work harder for their community and it is evident that she cares deeply about people. Bowinn has been a breath of fresh air in the Legislature and is one of our strongest voices in the fight against climate change. I certainly hope she is re-elected in North Vancouver-Lonsdale." Ma did acknowledge her odds of winning on a podcast recorded before the campaign began, "Even before COVID, I was targeted a lot by the BC Liberals and I don't think that they're wrong to target this seat. I'm the first BC NDP MLA to win a seat on the North Shore in a very long time, since 1991… So, history says that I will probably lose my seat at the next election, honestly." Nevertheless, Ma told the North Shore News, "Our government simply does not have the runway remaining to lead this province all the way out of the pandemic in a manner that the British Columbians deserve. We would have lost 12 months to partisan bickering and electioneering, which was already happening regardless of an early election call." As of early October 25, 2020; Ma has been declared the winner of the 2020 British Columbia general election for North Vancouver-Lonsdale by many British Columbia news outlets and told the North Shore News, "Votes are not owned, they're earned. And I will continue to work hard every single day for as long as I have the honour of serving North Vancouver-Lonsdale to deserve their support."

During the COVID-19 pandemic, Ma became known for staying connected with constituents in creative ways. She hosted regular Facebook-Live and Instagram-Live chats, offered online origami lessons, visited classrooms virtually, and issued regular COVID-19 information bulletins to subscribers. Ma also went "on tour" with District of North Vancouver Councillor Jordan Back, playing brief musical concerts outside multi-family apartment buildings and long-term care homes for residents inside.

=== Transportation ===
Since getting elected in 2017, Ma has focused largely on transportation-related issues. Ma had campaigned heavily on the issue of transportation during the 2017 election. Ma hosted and moderated a "Traffic Sucks!" forum in February 2017, during which Ma said housing affordability is a key factor when it comes to traffic congestion. Ma also campaigned on "increased investment in public infrastructure as a means of producing jobs, boosting the economy, and ensuring that the province is able to meet the needs of its businesses and residents long into the future" and expanding BC's rapid transportation network "as a way of providing a long-term solution to traffic congestion in the North Shore and throughout the Lower Mainland and as a key component of a sustainable transportation model for a growing province".

On July 18, 2017, Ma was appointed Parliamentary Secretary for TransLink, working under the Minister of Municipal Affairs and Housing, Selina Robinson. Her main job as Parliamentary Secretary for TransLink is overseeing the transit authority as it goes through a critical phase of expansion. The NDP has already committed to funding 40 per cent of the TransLink Mayors' Council vision, which includes another SeaBus and 10-minute service, a B-line bus from Phibbs Exchange to Dundarave and an increase in regular bus service.

Ma was also selected to serve as the Chair of the Select Standing Committee on Crown Corporations. Ma led the all-party committee consisting of BC Liberal, BC NDP, and BC Green MLAs in the creation of a unanimous report dated February 15, 2018, making 32 recommendations for establishing a provincial regulatory regime to govern transportation network companies providing ride-hailing services. She reconvened the all-party committee again in 2019 in the creation of a second consensus report dated March 12, 2019, making 11 recommendations on four specific areas of regulation of the Transportation Network Services industry: Boundaries, Supply, Fares, and Driver's Licenses.

Although outside of the official purview of her role as Parliamentary Secretary for TransLink, Ma also worked with in her first term with Minister of Transportation and Infrastructure, Claire Trevena to increase BC Transit bus service. Ma initiated the Integrated North Shore Transportation Planning Project in 2018 and served as its chair until the release of its final report in September 2018, which now serves as the North Shore's action plan and guiding document for improving transportation.

As of November 26, 2020, Minister of State for Infrastructure Ma has a mandate letter to, "Support our economic recovery from the COVID-19 pandemic by working with the Minister of Transportation and Infrastructure to advance critical pieces of transportation infrastructure that will benefit communities across B.C." Projects according to the letter will include, "Work to extend the Millennium Line to Arbutus, with an eventual terminus at UBC, and ensure prompt design and construction of the Surrey-Langley Skytrain." Also included are a widening of Highway 1, replacing the Massey Crossing, completing the Pattullo Bridge replacement, and finally supporting, "The planning and development of key transit projects, like high-speed transit links for the North Shore and the expansion of rail up the Fraser Valley, which will bring cleaner transit, support economic growth and deliver more construction jobs for B.C. workers."

=== Integrated North Shore Transportation Planning Project (INSTPP) ===
Ma initiated the Integrated North Shore Transportation Planning Project in 2018 and served as its chair. The Integrated North Shore Transportation Planning Project "is a cross-jurisdictional and collaborative forum initiated to provide an integrated transportation approach that is environmentally progressive, values safety, improves the movement of people and goods, and respects First Nation's interests." Major partners in the project include the City of North Vancouver, District of North Vancouver, District of West Vancouver, TransLink, Government of Canada, Government of BC Ministry of Transportation and Infrastructure, Tsleil-Waututh Nation and Squamish Nation. It released its report publicly on September 13, 2018.

According to the Letter from the chair, "the work was conducted with a level of inter-agency collaboration that is unprecedented" and "represents the first time that key public transportation agencies on the North Shore, including seven governments, have been able to collectively establish a comprehensive understanding of the transportation challenges that North Shore communities face, and produce a unified and actionable approach for moving forward as a region."

=== North Shore Rapid Transit ===
Ma is vocal in her support for rapid bus lines as precursors for rapid transit, including a controversial rapid bus line running through North Vancouver (district municipality), North Vancouver (city), and West Vancouver. In response to opposition from businesses and residents of West Vancouver, Ma created a West Vancouver B-Line themed parody of 'Hey Jude' by The Beatles. Ma is credited with the genesis of the first-ever study into the feasibility of a rapid transit line connecting the North Shore and downtown Vancouver, which was launched by the provincial government in May 2019.

However, Ma and TransLink did succeed after consultation in getting a RapidBus (TransLink) line from Park Royal Exchange eastward as R2 Marine Dr to Phibbs Exchange. The express bus service with bus rapid transit elements was launched on April 6, 2020, quietly due to the COVID-19 pandemic in British Columbia. Some of her fans on social media call this the "#BowinnLine" as a tribute to her leadership.

As the new Minister of State for Infrastructure, one of Minister Ma's projects is, "Work with cabinet colleagues, communities and regions to support the planning and development of key transit projects, like high-speed transit links for the North Shore ... which will bring cleaner transit, support economic growth and deliver more construction jobs for B.C. workers."

=== Housing ===
Ma is a vocal advocate for action on Metro Vancouver's housing crisis. Her support for housing demand management measures like the BC NDP Government increases to the foreign buyers tax, new speculation tax, and increased school tax rate on homes over $3M has drawn criticism from prominent Realtors and anti-tax advocates in wealthy constituencies nearby.

In 2018, Ma raised funds for the North Vancouver homeless shelter by spending the night in her car with the North Vancouver St. John's Anglican Church group and helped the North Vancouver youth safe house receive operational funding from the provincial government for the first time since it opened in 2008. Ma joined high school students from Carson Graham Secondary in sleeping outside overnight to raise funds for Covenant House, an agency for homeless youth who have fled abuse or been forced from their homes. She is also known for her work supporting vulnerable renters.

=== Emergency Management ===
Ma was British Columbia's first Minister of Emergency Management and Climate Readiness, a ministry created by the Eby Government in recognition of the impacts of climate change on communities. She led British Columbia's response to the 2022 ice storm, 2023 avalanche season, 2023 wildfires, 2023 extreme drought, 2024 spring freshet flooding, 2024 wildfires, and 2024 Chilcotin landslide risk. She also presided over the 2023 provincial state of emergency due to wildfires, which was in place between August 18, 2023 and September 14, 2023.

In the fall of 2023, Ma tabled the Emergency Disaster Management Act, 2023, which later passed in November 2023 following 55 hours of section-by-section debate. "This legislation formally recognizes the rights of First Nations as decision-makers in emergency management," said Ma of the proposed legislation at the time, "The Emergency and Disaster Management Act moves towards a holistic four-phase approach of mitigation, preparation, response and recovery. It requires climate risk assessments and updates the concept of what an emergency is to reflect modern realities."

== Electoral record ==
2024 British Columbia general election: North Vancouver-Lonsdale
Party	Candidate	Votes	%	±%	Expenditures
New Democratic	Bowinn Ma	16,759	64.88	+4.78	$66,957.59
Conservative	David Splett	9,073	35.12	–	$33,580.64
Total valid votes/expense limit		25,832	99.59	–	$71,700.08
Total rejected ballots		107	0.41	–	
Turnout		25,939	58.91	–	
Registered voters		44,034			
New Democratic notional hold		Swing		-15.2	
Source: Elections BC

2020 British Columbia general election: North Vancouver-Lonsdale
Party	Candidate	Votes	%	±%	Expenditures
New Democratic	Bowinn Ma	15,878	59.87	+14.42	$57,010.97
Liberal	Lyn Anglin	7,274	27.43	−10.71	$42,676.15
Green	Christopher Hakes	3,369	12.70	−2.55	$0.00
Total valid votes		26,521	100.00	–	
Total rejected ballots					
Turnout					
Registered voters					
Source: Elections BC

2017 British Columbia general election: North Vancouver-Lonsdale
Party	Candidate	Votes	%	±%	Expenditures
New Democratic	Bowinn Ma	12,361	45.45	+4.87	$64,191
Liberal	Naomi Yamamoto	10,373	38.14	−7.33	$69,946
Green	Richard Warrington	4,148	15.25	+5.97	$466
Libertarian	Donald N.S. Wilson	316	1.16	+0.52	$150
Total valid votes		27,198	100.00	–	
Total rejected ballots		143	0.52	−0.07	
Turnout		27,341	65.68	+5.30	
Registered voters		41,629			
Source: Elections BC
