= David J. Mitchell =

Canadian politician

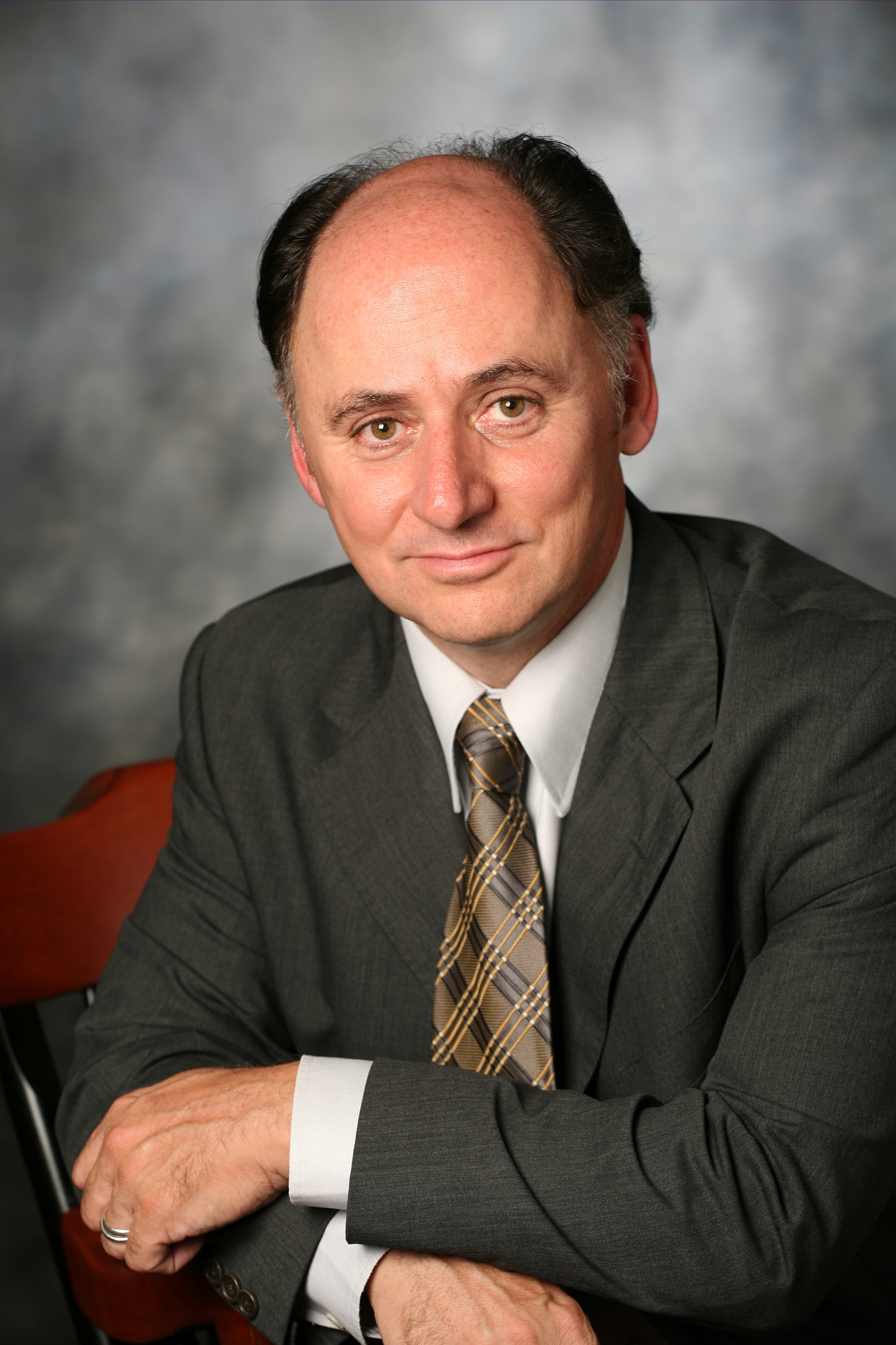

MLA for West Vancouver-Garibaldi
- In office 1991–1996
- Preceded by: first member
- Succeeded by: Ted Nebbeling

Personal details
- Born: March 15, 1954 (age 72) Montreal, Quebec
- Party: Liberal / Independent

David Joseph Mitchell (born March 15, 1954) is a Canadian writer, former politician, university and college administrator, businessman and political commentator. He is a former President & CEO of the Public Policy Forum, an Ottawa-based NGO, which he abruptly left on August 20, 2015. His current position is vice president, College Advancement and Chief External Relations Officer at Bow Valley College in Calgary, Alberta.

== Education, writings ==
Mitchell holds a master's degree in Canadian and American history from Simon Fraser University in Burnaby, British Columbia. He served as Editor and Archivist at the British Columbia Provincial Archives. He is a self-confessed 'political junkie', who is a frequent commentator on Canadian politics and public life on radio and television. He has won awards for his writing, and is a former newspaper columnist (Vancouver Sun 1996–98; Business in Vancouver 1995–98).

He has authored a number of books about politics and history in BC:

- W.A.C. Bennett and the rise of British Columbia, Vancouver 1983, Douglas & McIntyre, (ISBN 0-88894-395-4). A biography of W. A. C. Bennett.
- Succession: the political reshaping of British Columbia, 1986 (ISBN 0-88894-566-3). A synopsis of the Social Credit administrations since W.A.C. Bennett.
- All aboard!: the Canadian Rockies by train, 1995 (ISBN 1-55054-419-5)
- The Hongkong Bank of Canada Story – Origin & Early Years, 1996
- British Columbia's business leaders of the century, 1999 (editor)

== Family, business career ==
He is the father of two daughters, and is married to author and women's advocate, Shari Graydon.

Mitchell has also worked as an executive in the forestry industry and in resource industries in western Canada (1984–1990).

== Political career ==
He gained experience in parliamentary procedure and legislative processes as Deputy Clerk of the Saskatchewan Legislature (1981–84). He was elected in 1991 to the Legislative Assembly of British Columbia, for the Liberal Party, in the riding of West Vancouver-Garibaldi. He was the party's House Leader, but resigned his position as a result of a rift over the Charlottetown constitutional accord. He sat the remainder of his term, until 1996, as an "Independent". During his term, he was a watchdog on a broad range of issues including resource management, labour relations, advanced education, and parliamentary reform.

== University/College administrator ==
He served as Vice President of External Relations at Simon Fraser University from 1997 to 2002, where he was responsible for fundraising, alumni relations, media and public relations, and government affairs. SFU raised over $65 million under his direction and significantly expanded its campus in downtown Vancouver.

He became Vice President of University Relations at the University of Ottawa in September 2002. He led the university through a major re-branding initiative, and helped launch the largest fundraising campaign in the university's history, which exceeded its $200 million objective a year ahead of schedule.

In September 2007, he moved to Queen's University, assuming the post of Vice Principal (Advancement). In January 2009, he returned to Ottawa to take a new position as president and CEO of the Public Policy Forum, an independent, non-partisan NGO that specializes in convening Canadian leaders on issues of public service and governance.

In April 2016, he commenced his new role at Bow Valley College as vice president, College Advancement and Chief External Relations Officer.

== Community service ==
Mitchell has served on the boards of the Vancouver Art Gallery, Vancouver Aquarium and Marine Science Centre, the Ottawa Symphony, the Great Canadian Theatre company, the Parliamentary Centre and on the advisory committee of the Centre for the Study of Democracy at Queen's University. He is a Governor and Fellow of the Royal Canadian Geographical Society.
