= Joan McIntyre =

Canadian politician (born 1949 or 1950)

Member of the British Columbia Legislative Assembly for West Vancouver-Sea to Sky West Vancouver-Garibaldi (2005-2009)
- In office May 17, 2005 – May 14, 2013
- Preceded by: Ted Nebbeling
- Succeeded by: Jordan Sturdy

Minister of State for Intergovernmental Relations of British Columbia
- In office June 23, 2008 – June 10, 2009
- Premier: Gordon Campbell
- Preceded by: John van Dongen
- Succeeded by: Naomi Yamamoto

Personal details
- Born: 1949 or 1950 (age 76–77)
- Party: British Columbia Liberal Party
- Spouse: Andrew Pottinger
- Education: Trinity College, Toronto

Joan McIntyre (born 1949 or 1950) is a former Canadian politician who served as a member of the Legislative Assembly (MLA) of British Columbia, representing the electoral district of West Vancouver-Garibaldi from 2005 to 2009, and West Vancouver-Sea to Sky from 2009 to 2013. As part of the British Columbia Liberal Party caucus, she served as Minister of State for Intergovernmental Relations from 2008 to 2009 under Premier Gordon Campbell.

== Biography ==
McIntyre grew up in Toronto, Ontario, and studied political science at the University of Toronto's Trinity College, graduating with a bachelor of arts degree in 1971. She co-founded the polling firm McIntyre & Mustel Research Associates Ltd. in 1980, before selling her interest in the firm in 1996. She and her husband Andrew Pottinger have two children together.

She served on the BC Liberal riding executive for West Vancouver-Garibaldi for 12 years, and was president for six of those years. With that riding's incumbent Liberal MLA Ted Nebbeling declining to seek re-election, McIntyre sought and won the Liberal nomination, and was elected the riding's MLA by a margin of 5,573 votes in the 2005 provincial election. She was named to Premier Gordon Campbell's cabinet in June 2008 as Minister of State for Intergovernmental Relations. In 2009, she was re-elected to the same riding under its new name of West Vancouver-Sea to Sky by a margin of 6,019 votes, but did not return to the cabinet.

During her time in the legislature, McIntyre had sat on the Cabinet Committee on Families and was the chair of the Select Standing Committee on Children and Youth. As well, McIntyre previously sat on four Cabinet Committees: Agenda and Priorities, Agenda Development, Legislative Review and Treasury Board. She also served as the Deputy Chair of the Select Standing Committee on Public Accounts, and was a member on the Select Standing Committee on Crown Corporations and the Agricultural Planning Government Caucus Committee.

She announced in September 2012 that she would not run again in the following year's provincial election.
