= Jordan Sturdy =

Canadian politician (born 1962/3)

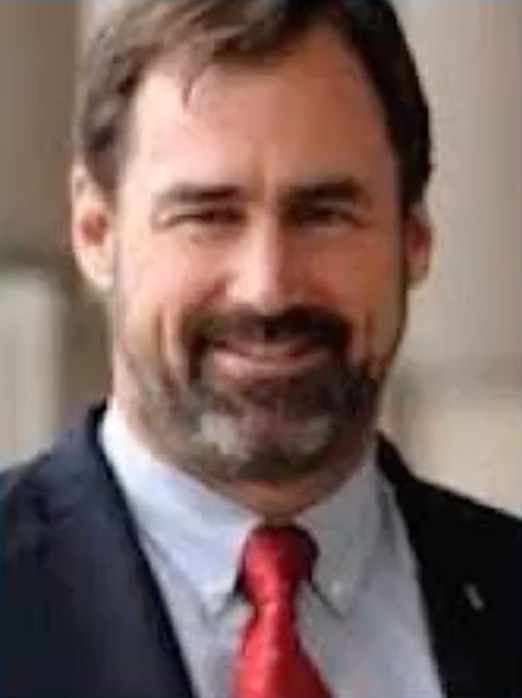

Member of the British Columbia Legislative Assembly for West Vancouver-Sea to Sky
- In office May 14, 2013 – September 21, 2024
- Preceded by: Joan McIntyre
- Succeeded by: Jeremy Valeriote

Personal details
- Born: 1962 or 1963 (age 63–64)
- Party: BC United

Jordan Sturdy (born 1962/3) is a Canadian politician, who represented the electoral district of West Vancouver-Sea to Sky in the Legislative Assembly of British Columbia from 2013 until 2024. He is a member of BC United, having been first elected under the party's previous designation as the British Columbia Liberal Party.

== Biography ==
Prior to his election to the legislature, Sturdy served as mayor of Pemberton for eight years.

On June 12, 2017, he was appointed to Cabinet as Minister of the Environment. When the Liberal Party became the Official Opposition, he was named Critic for Transportation and Infrastructure. Since 2020, he has served as the Shadow Minister for BC Ferries, Fisheries & Aquaculture.

In the 2020 British Columbia general election, he was initially declared defeated in his riding by Jeremy Valeriote of the British Columbia Green Party, but won reelection by just 41 votes once all mail-in and absentee ballots had been counted. A judicial recount was held due to the small margin of victory, which affirmed Sturdy's 41 vote lead.

In January 2024, Jordan Sturdy announced that he would not seek a fourth term as an MLA in the upcoming provincial election.

== Electoral record ==
2020 British Columbia general election: West Vancouver-Sea to Sky
Party	Candidate	Votes	%	±%	Expenditures
Liberal	Jordan Sturdy	9,249	37.54	−5.53	$51,349.99
Green	Jeremy Valeriote	9,189	37.30	+8.66	$37,603.39
New Democratic	Keith Murdoch	6,197	25.16	−1.77	$9,806.90
Total valid votes		24,635	99.45	–	
Total rejected ballots		137	0.55	+0.14	
Turnout		24,772	56.89	−4.20	
Registered voters		43,546			
Liberal hold		Swing		–7.10	
Source: Elections BC

2017 British Columbia general election: West Vancouver-Sea to Sky
Party	Candidate	Votes	%	±%	Expenditures
Liberal	Jordan Sturdy	10,449	43.08	−9.39	$67,085
Green	Dana Moore Taylor	6,947	28.64	+17.69	$11,109
New Democratic	Michelle Livaja	6,532	26.93	−5.54	$4,565
Libertarian	Michael Cambridge	186	0.76	–	$250
Independent	Tristan Andrew Galbraith	143	0.59	–	$250
Total valid votes		24,257	100.00	–	
Total rejected ballots		100	0.41	0	
Turnout		24,357	61.09	+4.41	
Registered voters		39,870			
Source: Elections BC

2013 British Columbia general election: West Vancouver-Sea to Sky
Party	Candidate	Votes	%	±%	Expenditures
Liberal	Jordan Sturdy	11,272	52.47	−2.41	$120,399
New Democratic	Ana Santos	6,966	32.47	+10.24	$21,457
Green	Richard Warrington	2,359	10.95	−11.92	$4,200
Conservative	Ian McLeod	653	3.06	–	$621
Independent	Jon Johnson	225	1.04	–	$1,231
Total valid votes		21,478	100.00		
Total rejected ballots		89	0.41		
Turnout		21,567	56.68		
Source: Elections BC

British Columbia provincial government of Christy Clark
Cabinet post (1)
Predecessor	Office	Successor
Mary Polak	Minister of the Environment; June 12, 2017 – July 18, 2017	George Heyman
