= Ted Nebbeling =

Canadian politician

Member of the British Columbia Legislative Assembly for West Vancouver-Garibaldi
- In office May 28, 1996 – May 17, 2005
- Preceded by: David J. Mitchell
- Succeeded by: Joan McIntyre

Minister of State for Community Charter of British Columbia
- In office June 5, 2001 – January 26, 2004
- Premier: Gordon Campbell
- Preceded by: Position established
- Succeeded by: Position abolished

Mayor of Whistler
- In office 1990–1996
- Preceded by: Drew Meredith
- Succeeded by: Hugh O’Reilly

Personal details
- Born: 1943 or 1944 Amsterdam, Netherlands
- Died: October 28, 2009 (aged 65) Vancouver, British Columbia, Canada
- Cause of death: Colon cancer
- Party: BC Liberal
- Spouse: Jan Holmberg (m. 2003)

Ted Nebbeling (1943/44 – October 28, 2009) was a Canadian politician who served as a member of the Legislative Assembly (MLA) of British Columbia, representing the electoral district of West Vancouver-Garibaldi from 1996 to 2005. As part of the British Columbia Liberal Party caucus, he was Minister of State for the Community Charter from 2001 to 2004 under Premier Gordon Campbell.

== Biography ==
Born in Amsterdam, Nebbeling moved to Canada in 1977 along with his partner Jan Holmberg, who was originally from Sweden. The couple operated a sandwich shop in Downtown Vancouver before selling the business and moving to Whistler in 1979, where they ran a number of retail stores.

Concerned that the local economy was too dependent on winter activities, Nebbeling decided to run for office, becoming a Whistler municipal councillor in 1986 and winning re-election in 1988. He was then elected the municipality's mayor in 1990, and won a second term in 1993. He also served as chair of the Sea to Sky Economic Development Commission, and as director of the Whistler Resort Association.

In the 1996 provincial election, he ran as a Liberal candidate in West Vancouver-Garibaldi, and was elected the riding's MLA. While the Liberals were the official opposition, Nebbeling served as critic for municipal affairs, forests, and employment and investment in the 36th Parliament. He was re-elected in the 2001 provincial election, which saw the Liberals come to power with a majority government; he was named to Premier Gordon Campbell's cabinet that June as Minister of State for Community Charter. In that role he was tasked with preparing legislation concerning the new Community Charter, which aimed to provide local governments with more power and flexibility. He was also involved in Vancouver/Whistler's bid for the 2010 Winter Olympics.

A few months after same-sex marriage became legal in British Columbia, he married his partner Jan on November 15, 2003, becoming Canada's highest-ranking politician at that point to be married to a same-sex partner. He was dropped from cabinet in a January 2004 shuffle, one day after his marriage was announced in the media. The government stated that the timing of the shuffle was a coincidence and without prejudicial intent, as Nebbeling was openly gay at the time of his election.

In January 2005, Nebbeling announced that he would not run again in that May's provincial election. After finishing his term as MLA, he entered the race once more for mayor of Whistler, but lost in that November's municipal election to Ken Melamed.

After being diagnosed with colon cancer in 2008, he died from the illness on October 28, 2009, in Vancouver, aged 65.
