= Katherine Whittred =

Canadian politician

Member of the British Columbia Legislative Assembly for North Vancouver-Lonsdale
- In office May 28, 1996 – May 12, 2009
- Preceded by: David D. Schreck
- Succeeded by: Naomi Yamamoto

Minister of State for Intermediate, Long Term and Home Care of British Columbia
- In office June 5, 2001 – January 26, 2004
- Premier: Gordon Campbell

Personal details
- Party: Liberal

Katherine Anne Whittred is a retired Canadian politician. She was a BC Liberal Member of the Legislative Assembly of British Columbia, from 1996 to 2009, representing the riding of North Vancouver-Lonsdale.

Whittred was first elected in 1996, defeating one-term NDP MLA and well known political commentator David Schreck. She served as chair of the Liberal caucus while in opposition, and served in the cabinet of Gordon Campbell from 2001 to 2004 as Minister of State for Intermediate, Long Term and Home Care. In 2009, Whittred was appointed Deputy Speaker for the last sitting of the Legislature before that year's election.

In March 2006, Whittred introduced a Motion in the Legislature to abolish the practice of mandatory retirement. In May 2007, Bill 31 was passed, which amended the Human Rights Code to eliminate mandatory retirement based on age.

Whittred studied at the University of Calgary where she obtained a Bachelor of Education degree. Before her election to the Legislative Assembly, she worked as a secondary school teacher with the Burnaby School District.
