= Local Government Act (British Columbia) =

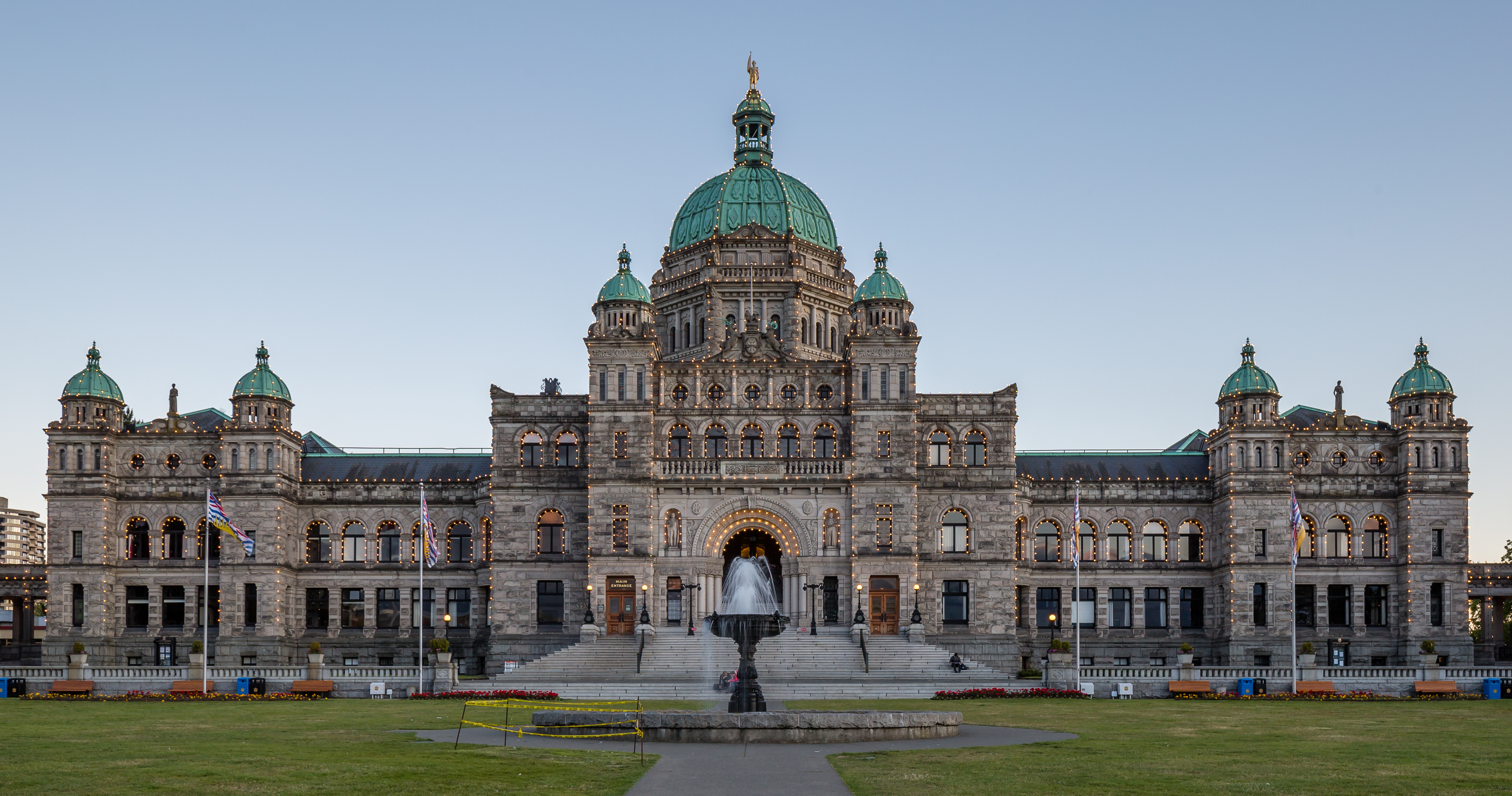
- Legislative Assembly of British Columbia

Legislative Assembly of British Columbia
- Citation: RSBC 2015, c 1
- Territorial extent: British Columbia
- Enacted by: Legislative Assembly of British Columbia

The Local Government Act is an act of the Legislative Assembly of British Columbia in British Columbia, Canada.

The Local Government Act is the primary legislation governing regional districts, but also applies in certain respects to municipalities. The Local Government Act replaced the Municipal Act in 1998 and was, at the time, the sole source of legislative authority for both regional districts and municipalities. Upon enactment of the Community Charter in 2004, several provisions related to municipalities were taken out of the Local Government Act and relocated to the Community Charter. Since then, the Local Government Act has primarily been focused on regional districts.
