= David Schreck =

Canadian politician

David D. Schreck
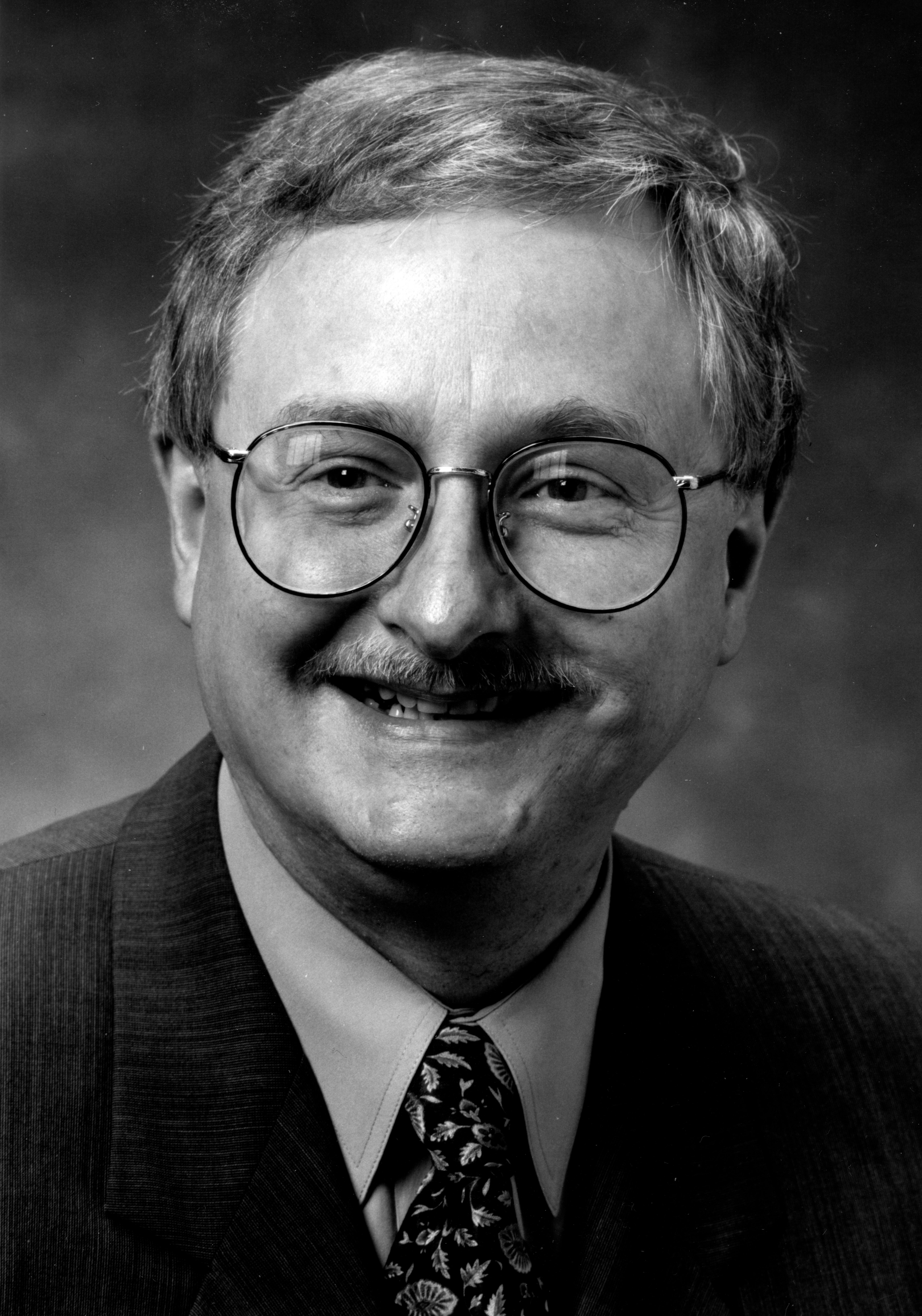

Member of the British Columbia Legislative Assembly for North Vancouver-Lonsdale
- In office October 17, 1991 – May 28, 1996
- Preceded by: Riding Established
- Succeeded by: Katherine Whittred

Personal details
- Born: April 9, 1947 (age 79)
- Party: New Democrat
- Occupation: pundit

David D. Schreck is a one-time Member of the Legislative Assembly in the province of British Columbia in Canada and a political pundit.

== Career ==
Schreck represented the riding of North Vancouver-Lonsdale from 1991 to 1996 for the New Democratic Party of British Columbia. He served as parliamentary secretary to the Premier and to a Minister of Employment and Investment.

He won election in 1991 by half a percentage point (less than 500 votes) but lost his seat in the 1996 BC election, by more than 10 per cent of the vote, to Katherine Anne Whittred. Afterwards, Schreck failed to win a councillor's seat for the District of North Vancouver and declared he would not again run in a political election. His term as MLA was his only successful bid after tries in the 1983, 1986, and 1991 provincial elections and the 1984 federal election.

He publishes political commentary on his website, and appears weekly on Victoria radio station CFAX with host Murray Langdon. His background is in economics. Schreck received a degree in that field from Grinnell College in 1969 and a Ph.D. from the University of British Columbia in 1978.

From 1998 to 2001, Schreck served as special advisor to the Premier of British Columbia.

In October 2011, his tweet, "Is Premier Clark's cleavage revealing attire appropriate for the legislature?" generated controversy and a reprimand from NDP leader Adrian Dix.
