= Naomi Yamamoto =

Canadian politician

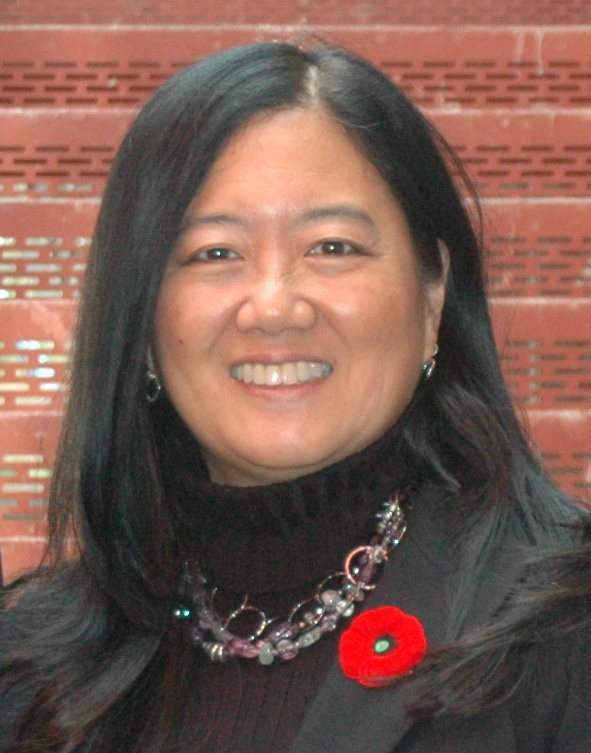
- Yamamoto in 2011

Member of the British Columbia Legislative Assembly for North Vancouver-Lonsdale
- In office May 12, 2009 – May 9, 2017
- Preceded by: Katherine Whittred
- Succeeded by: Bowinn Ma

Minister of State for Intergovernmental Relations of British Columbia
- In office June 10, 2009 – October 25, 2010
- Premier: Gordon Campbell
- Preceded by: Joan McIntyre
- Succeeded by: Margaret MacDiarmid (Minister Responsible for the Intergovernmental Relations Secretariat)

Minister of State for Building Code Renewal of British Columbia
- In office October 25, 2010 – March 14, 2011
- Premier: Gordon Campbell
- Preceded by: Position established
- Succeeded by: Position abolished

Minister of Advanced Education of British Columbia
- In office March 14, 2011 – September 5, 2012
- Premier: Christy Clark
- Preceded by: Ida Chong (Science and Universities)
- Succeeded by: John Yap (Advanced Education, Innovation and Technology)

Minister of State for Tourism and Small Business of British Columbia Minister of State for Small Business (2012-2013)
- In office September 5, 2012 – June 30, 2015
- Premier: Christy Clark
- Preceded by: Colin Hansen (Note: After Hansen's appointment as Minister Responsible for Small Business ended on March 14, 2011, the small business portfolio was vacant its re-establishment as Minister of State for Small Business on September 5, 2012.)
- Succeeded by: Coralee Oakes (Small Business and Red Tape Reduction)

Minister of State for Emergency Preparedness of British Columbia
- In office July 30, 2015 – June 12, 2017
- Premier: Christy Clark
- Preceded by: Position established
- Succeeded by: Position abolished

Personal details
- Born: 1960 or 1961 (age 65–66) Vancouver, British Columbia, Canada
- Party: British Columbia Liberal Party
- Spouse: Fred Pinnock
- Education: University of British Columbia
- Occupation: Business owner

Naomi Yamamoto (born 1960 or 1961) is a Canadian politician who served as a member of the Legislative Assembly (MLA) of British Columbia, representing the electoral district of North Vancouver-Lonsdale from 2009 to 2017. As part of the British Columbia Liberal Party caucus, she was a cabinet minister under premiers Gordon Campbell and Christy Clark. She is the first Japanese Canadian member of the BC legislature.

Prior to her election to the legislature, Yamamoto owned and operated a business that started as a specialty shop for laser printing but evolved to focus on design and had created props for the television and film industry. She spent time on the governing boards of Capilano College, the North Shore Credit Union, the Vancouver Coastal Health Authority, and the Gordon and Marion Smith Foundation. She completed one term as president of the B.C. Chamber of Commerce and worked as the president and general manager of the North Vancouver Chamber of Commerce from 2007 until she was elected as MLA.

== Background ==
Yamamoto is a third-generation Japanese-Canadian. Both her parents were born in Vancouver, but were interned in the Kootenays for part of World War II. Yamamoto was also born in Vancouver and grew up with one brother and one sister; the whole family moved to North Vancouver in 1970. Her father had instilled in her an appreciation of outdoor activities, such as fishing, trail running, and cycling, which turned into lifelong hobbies.

She majored in film and television studies at the University of British Columbia, graduating with a bachelor of arts degree in 1982. She went on to work at her family's Japan Camera outlet for seven years. In 1988, along with a business partner, she opened her own company, Lasercolor Design & Printing, which specialized in laser printing. With a growing clientele in the film and television industry who needed props, the business was renamed Lasercolor Business Graphics and Props. As laser printing became more common, the company was renamed again to Tora Design, focusing more on the design aspect.

She started volunteering at the North Shore Neighbourhood House, which assisted seniors and at-risk children. She was active with the North Vancouver Chamber of Commerce and served one term (1997–98) as president of the B.C. Chamber of Commerce. She spent six years, beginning in 1995, on the Capilano College board of governors; eleven years, beginning in 1998, on the North Shore Credit Union board of directors; and eight years, beginning in 2001, on the Vancouver Coastal Health board of directors.

In 1998 she helped organize a BC-specific economic summit and participate in a provincial government task force examining how to improve the province's economy. She was recognized by the Vancouver Board of Trade in 2000 with the Women in the Spotlight Award, and by the newspaper Business in Vancouver in 2003 with their Influential Women in Business Award. She also served on the board of directors for the Gordon and Marion Smith Foundation for Young Artists, beginning in 2004.

In February 2007 she started work as the president and general manager of the North Vancouver Chamber of Commerce, a position she kept until she was elected MLA. In that role she supported the introduction of the carbon tax and opposed a proposal for introducing a statutory holiday in February.

She is married to Fred Pinnock, a former Royal Canadian Mounted Police officer.

== Provincial politics ==
=== Nomination and Campbell ministry ===
Yamamoto expressed interest in pursuing a career in provincial politics in June 2008, when there was speculation that long-time North Vancouver-Seymour MLA Daniel Jarvis was going to retire. While Jarvis kept his options open, North Vancouver-Lonsdale MLA Katherine Whittred did retire. In the subsequent BC Liberal Party nomination meeting for the riding, Yamamoto was challenged by former Member of Parliament Don Bell and former Vancouver city councillor Jennifer Clarke. Yamamoto was considered the underdog but defeated Bell in the second round of the preferential ballot.

In the May 2009 general election, Yamamoto faced former District of North Vancouver mayor Janice Harris for the BC New Democratic Party (NDP), acupuncturist Michelle Corcos for the Green Party, former leader of the BC Reform Party Ron Gamble, and BC Conservative Party candidate Ian McLeod. While the riding was previously considered safe for the BC Liberals, Harris was also considered a star candidate for the NDP. Both candidates had awkward moments, with Yamamoto refusing to participate in an all-candidates forum sponsored by the local teacher's association. The North Shore Credit Union, of which Harris was a member and Yamamoto a board member, had donated $7,500 to the BC Liberal Party. Nonetheless, Yamamoto won the election, making her the first person with Japanese ancestry to be elected MLA in BC.

In the 39th Parliament, Yamamoto's BC Liberal Party formed a majority government, and she was named to Premier Gordon Campbell's cabinet as Minister of State for Intergovernmental Relations. In this position she worked with American and Canadian federal officials in resolving Canada–United States border issues prior to the 2010 Winter Olympics in Vancouver, as well as hosting officials from other governments during the games. She helped coordinate the provincial government response to the US state of Montana and the United Nations concerning resource extraction in Flathead River Valley that was impacting the Waterton-Glacier International Peace Park; the province implemented a short term ban on mining and oil/gas extraction, followed a permanent ban in a designated area with the Flathead Watershed Area Conservation Act in 2011.

She was a strong advocate of the Harmonized Sales Tax (HST), as she had been lobbying in favour of its introduction in BC for years prior to running for political office. However, it proved to be an unpopular initiative with 6,786 people in her North Vancouver-Lonsdale riding signing the FightHST group's petition asking for it to be repealed; the FightHST group also considered conducting a recall campaign against Yamamoto. Just prior to his resignation, Premier Campbell shuffled his cabinet in October 2010, moving Yamamoto to the new role of Minister of State for Building Code Renewal. In this position she was to oversee the modernization of the provincial building code with considerations given to new techniques and technologies, as well as reconciling provisions for single- and multi-family dwellings.

=== Clark ministry ===
In the 2011 BC Liberal leadership election triggered by Campbell's resignation, Yamamoto endorsed George Abbott. She had found all the leadership contenders held similar views on economic issues, health care and education, but that Abbott was the more personable contender. After Christy Clark won the party leadership and became premier, she promoted Yamamoto to Minister of Advanced Education in March 2011. She toured various post-secondary institutions across the province and announced $1.5 million for healthcare training programs, $500,000 for a First Nations teaching program, and $300,000 to train First Nations aquaculture workers. She rebuffed calls for greater student affordability and provincial funding for the universities, defending the existing student loan program and the existing provincial funding formula, citing the "challenging fiscal environment". She advocated for a greater role for international students, which Premier Clark's BC Jobs Plan called for increasing by 50% within four years the number of international students in BC. The BC Jobs Plan also called for the creation of a new international education council, which seemed to duplicate the existing BC Council for International Education and led to criticism that the government was either re-announcing old measures or unaware of the existing council. Yamamoto supported the creation of the new council, as an independent steering committee with a broader scope.

As Minister of Advanced Education, Yamamoto introduced the Advanced Education Statutes Amendment Act, 2011 (Bill 18), which sought to implement several measures, including harmonizing the federal and provincial student load procedure, expanding the Personal Education Number system which tracks students in the BC educational system to also include private educational institutions, specifying that board members of colleges and universities are to act in the best interests of the institution, and updating the Architectural Institute of BC's dispute resolution process. The bill was introduced on November 3, 2011, but was not adopted before the winter break.

In May 2012, with her father in attendance, Yamamoto introduced the province of British Columbia's formal apology for its role in the internment of Japanese Canadians during World War II.

Yamamoto was re-assigned as Minister of State for Small Business in September 2012; she remained in cabinet after winning re-election in 2013, with her position re-titled to Minister of State for Tourism and Small Business. In July 2015 she was named to the newly established position of Minister of State for Emergency Preparedness.

She ran for re-election in 2017, but was defeated by NDP candidate Bowinn Ma. After finishing her term as MLA, Yamamoto became president of the BC Earthquake Alliance.

== Electoral history ==
2017 British Columbia general election: North Vancouver-Lonsdale
Party	Candidate	Votes	%	±%	Expenditures
New Democratic	Bowinn Ma	12,361	45.45	+4.87	$64,191
Liberal	Naomi Yamamoto	10,373	38.14	−7.33	$69,946
Green	Richard Warrington	4,148	15.25	+5.97	$466
Libertarian	Donald N.S. Wilson	316	1.16	+0.52	$150
Total valid votes		27,198	100.00	–	
Total rejected ballots		143	0.52	−0.07	
Turnout		27,341	65.68	+5.30	
Registered voters		41,629			
Source: Elections BC

2013 British Columbia general election: North Vancouver-Lonsdale
Party	Candidate	Votes	%	±%	Expenditures
Liberal	Naomi Yamamoto	11,060	45.47	–3.69	$92,377
New Democratic	Craig Keating	9,872	40.58	+3.48	$112,207
Green	Ryan Conroy	2,257	9.28	+0.75	$4,121
Conservative	Allan John Molyneaux	833	3.42	–0.69	$3,099
Libertarian	Laurence Watt	156	0.64	–	$250
British Columbia Party	Carra-Lynn Hodgson	77	0.32	–	$250
Communist	Kimball Cariou	71	0.29	–	$344
Total valid votes		24,326	100.00		
Total rejected ballots		145	0.59		
Turnout		24,471	60.38		
Source: Elections BC

B.C. General Election 2009: North Vancouver-Lonsdale
Party	Candidate	Votes	%	±	Expenditures
Liberal	Naomi Yamamoto	10,323	49		$108,381
New Democratic	Janice Harris	7,789	37		$86,306
Green	Michelle Corcos	1,791	9	–	$1,555
Conservative	Ian McLeod	862	4		$250
Reform	Ron Gamble	232	1		$1,491
Total Valid Votes		20,997	100		
Total Rejected Ballots		163	0.8		
Turnout		21,160	56		
