= Floyd Pinto =

Indian football coach (born 1986)

Personal information
- Date of birth: 16 December 1986 (age 39)
- Place of birth: Mumbai, India
- Height: 6 ft 1 in (1.85 m)

Team information
- Current team: Odisha (assistant)

Senior career*
Years	Team	Apps	(Gls)
2002-2016	Kenkre	456	(48)

International career
2006-2010	India	12	(2)

Managerial career
- 2016-2017: India U17 (assistant)
- 2017−2018: Indian Arrows (assistant)
- 2017–2019: India U19
- 2018−2019: Indian Arrows
- 2019−2022: RoundGlass Punjab (assistant)
- 2022−2023: NorthEast United (assistant)
- 2023-2024: NorthEast United (interim)
- 2024−2026: Odisha (assistant)
- * Club domestic league appearances and goals

Floyd Pinto (born 16 December 1986) is an Indian football coach. He is currently the assistant coach of Indian Super League club Odisha.

He was an IT engineer before taking up football coaching as a career.

== Personal life ==
Pinto grew up at Mumbai, India. He had his graduation in Information Technology from Don-Bosco Institute, Mumbai University at Kurla-Mumbai.

== Career ==
During his graduation at Don Bosco, when he was playing for Kenkre FC, the Institute administrator got him into part-time coach of Kenkre FC which at that time was part of Mumbai Elite Division and also for their team at I-League for around four years. He then graduated from Asian Football Confederation (AFC) with 'A' License in coaching from the May 2014 batch. He is one of youngest coach in the country holding AFC 'A' license.

In 2017, he joined Luís Norton de Matos as his deputy for the U-17 India National Team and as well as Indian Arrows later. Later on resignation of Matos as the coach of U-20 team and the India arrows in July 2018 he was unanimously appointed as the coach of India national under-20 football team and Indian Arrows Due to poor performance by India U20 team for the AFC qualification, he was released by AIFF as the head coach of the U20 team and the Indian Arrows club team.

=== NorthEast United ===
In August 2022, Pinto moved to Indian Super League club NorthEast United as an assistant to Israeli head coach Marco Balbul.

== Managerial statistics ==
As of 6 December 2019

Team	From	To	Record				
Team	From	To	G	W	D	L	Win %
(India) Indian Arrows	2018	2019	20	6	6	8	30.00
Total			20	6	6	8	30.00
