= North Vancouver-Lonsdale =

Provincial electoral district in British Columbia, Canada

British Columbia electoral district
- Interactive map of riding boundaries

Provincial electoral district
- Legislature: Legislative Assembly of British Columbia
MLA
Bowinn Ma
New Democratic
- First contested: 1991
- Last contested: 2026

Demographics
- Population (2021): 61,954
- Area (km²): 22
- Pop. density (per km²): 2,816.1
- Census division: Metro Vancouver
- Census subdivision: North Vancouver

North Vancouver-Lonsdale is a provincial electoral district in British Columbia that has been represented in the Legislative Assembly of British Columbia since 1991.

Created under the 1991 British Columbia electoral redistribution, the district was first contested in the 1991 general election. It was created out of parts of North Vancouver-Capilano and North Vancouver-Seymour.

== Demographics ==
Population, 2021	61,954
Area (km^{2})	22
Pop. density (people per km^{2})	2,816
Source: BC Electoral Boundaries Commission

== Geography ==
Located on the North Shore, the district comprises the urban core of the City of North Vancouver, including Lower Lonsdale and Central Lonsdale, as well as the Norgate neighbourhood in the District of North Vancouver. It extends north of Burrard Inlet and west toward the Lions Gate Bridge and X̱wemelch'stn.

== Members of the Legislative Assembly ==
This riding has elected the following members of the Legislative Assembly:

Assembly	Years	Member	Party
North Vancouver-Lonsdale; Riding created from North Vancouver-Capilano and North Vancouver-Seymour
35th	1991–1996	David Schreck	New Democratic
36th	1996–2001	Katherine Whittred	Liberal
37th	2001–2005	Katherine Whittred	Liberal
38th	2005–2009	Katherine Whittred	Liberal
39th	2009–2013	Naomi Yamamoto	Liberal
40th	2013–2017	Naomi Yamamoto	Liberal
41st	2017–2020	Bowinn Ma	New Democratic
42nd	2020–2024	Bowinn Ma	New Democratic
43rd	2024–2026	Bowinn Ma	New Democratic
44th	2026–present	Bowinn Ma	New Democratic

== Election results ==
=== 2026 ===
2026 British Columbia general election
** Preliminary results — Not yet official **
Party	Candidate	Votes	%	±%
New Democratic	Bowinn Ma	10,314	47.02	-17.86
Conservative	Trevor Withers	9,121	41.56	+6.46
Green	Joshua A Singer Johnson	2,502	11.41	
Total valid votes		21,937	99.81	
Total rejected ballots		42	0.19	-0.22
Turnout		21,979		
Registered voters				
Source: Elections BC
New Democratic hold		Swing		–12.16

=== 2024 ===
2024 British Columbia general election
Party	Candidate	Votes	%	±%	Expenditures
New Democratic	Bowinn Ma	16,759	64.88	+4.78	$66,957.59
Conservative	David Splett	9,073	35.12	–	$33,580.64
Total valid votes/expense limit		25,832	99.59	–	$71,700.08
Total rejected ballots		107	0.41	–	
Turnout		25,939	58.91	–	
Registered voters		44,034			
New Democratic notional hold		Swing		-15.2	
Source: Elections BC

=== 2020 ===
2020 provincial election redistributed results
Party	%
New Democratic	60.1
Liberal	27.1
Green	12.8

2020 British Columbia general election
Party	Candidate	Votes	%	±%	Expenditures
New Democratic	Bowinn Ma	15,878	59.87	+14.42	$57,010.97
Liberal	Lyn Anglin	7,274	27.43	−10.71	$42,676.15
Green	Christopher Hakes	3,369	12.70	−2.55	$0.00
Total valid votes		26,521	100.00	–	
Total rejected ballots					
Turnout					
Registered voters					
Source: Elections BC

=== 2017 ===
2017 British Columbia general election
Party	Candidate	Votes	%	±%	Expenditures
New Democratic	Bowinn Ma	12,361	45.45	+4.87	$64,191
Liberal	Naomi Yamamoto	10,373	38.14	−7.33	$69,946
Green	Richard Warrington	4,148	15.25	+5.97	$466
Libertarian	Donald N.S. Wilson	316	1.16	+0.52	$150
Total valid votes		27,198	100.00	–	
Total rejected ballots		143	0.52	−0.07	
Turnout		27,341	65.68	+5.30	
Registered voters		41,629			
Source: Elections BC

=== 2013 ===
2013 British Columbia general election
Party	Candidate	Votes	%	±%	Expenditures
Liberal	Naomi Yamamoto	11,060	45.47	–3.69	$92,377
New Democratic	Craig Keating	9,872	40.58	+3.48	$112,207
Green	Ryan Conroy	2,257	9.28	+0.75	$4,121
Conservative	Allan John Molyneaux	833	3.42	–0.69	$3,099
Libertarian	Laurence Watt	156	0.64	–	$250
British Columbia Party	Carra-Lynn Hodgson	77	0.32	–	$250
Communist	Kimball Cariou	71	0.29	–	$344
Total valid votes		24,326	100.00		
Total rejected ballots		145	0.59		
Turnout		24,471	60.38		
Source: Elections BC

=== 2009 ===
B.C. General Election 2009: North Vancouver-Lonsdale
Party	Candidate	Votes	%	±	Expenditures
Liberal	Naomi Yamamoto	10,323	49.16		$108,381
New Democratic	Janice Harris	7,789	37.10		$86,306
Green	Michelle Corcos	1,791	8.53	–	$1,555
Conservative	Ian McLeod	862	4.11		$250
Reform	Ron Gamble	232	1.10		$1,491
Total valid votes		20,997	100		
Total rejected ballots		163	0.77		
Turnout		21,160	55.56		

=== 2005 ===
2005 British Columbia general election
Party	Candidate	Votes	%	Expenditures
Liberal	Katherine Anne Whittred	9,375	44.51	$73,557
New Democratic	Craig Keating	8,391	39.83	$47,858
Green	Terry W. Long	2,562	12.16	$1,916
Reform	Ron Gamble	365	1.73	$3,569
Marijuana	Rebecca Ambrose	209	0.99	$100
Democratic Reform	Matt Wadsworth	163	0.78	$3,775
Total valid votes		21,065	100	
Total rejected ballots		150	0.71	
Turnout		21,215	64.31	

=== 2001 ===
B.C. General Election 2001: North Vancouver-Lonsdale
Party	Candidate	Votes	%	±	Expenditures
Liberal	Katherine Anne Whittred	11,362	59.84%		$28,334
Green	Terry W. Long	3,823	20.14%	–	$401
NDP	Roger Kishi	3,016	15.89%		$8,218
Marijuana	Darin Keith Neal	612	3.22%		$487
No Affiliation	Jonathan Xerxes Cote	173	0.91%		$784
Total valid votes		18,986	100.00%		
Total rejected ballots		167	0.88%		
Turnout		19,153	68.16%		

=== 1996 ===
B.C. General Election 1996: North Vancouver-Lonsdale
Party	Candidate	Votes	%	±	Expenditures
Liberal	Katherine Anne Whittred	9,325	46.37%		$42,920
NDP	David D. Schreck	7,151	35.56%		$23,029
Progressive Democrat	Royston Forsyth	1,736	8.63%	–	$7,930
Reform	Stanley Dzuba	1,241	6.17%		$9,378
Green	Renee Chalut	417	2.07%	–	$100
Libertarian	Anthony Jasich	149	0.74%		$100
Natural Law	Sheila Elliott	93	0.46%		$144
Total valid votes		20,112	100.00%		
Total rejected ballots		220	1.08%		
Turnout		20,332	71.16%		

=== 1991 ===
B.C. General Election 1991: North Vancouver-Lonsdale
Party	Candidate	Votes	%	±	Expenditures
NDP	David D. Schreck	7,535	38.63%		$35,238
Liberal	Floyd A. Sully	7,059	36.18%		$3,239
Social Credit	Marilyn Baker	4,622	23.69%	–	$26,007
Green	Phillip J. Petrik	207	1.06%	–	$371
Libertarian	Jonathan E. Story	85	0.44%		$11
Total valid votes		19,508	100.00%		
Total rejected ballots		428	2.15%		
Turnout		19,936	74.82%		

== See also ==
- Vancouver (electoral districts)
- List of British Columbia provincial electoral districts
- Canadian provincial electoral districts
