= West Vancouver-Sea to Sky =

Provincial electoral district in British Columbia, Canada

British Columbia electoral district
- Interactive map of riding boundaries

Provincial electoral district
- Legislature: Legislative Assembly of British Columbia
MLA
Jeremy Valeriote
Green
- District created: 1988
- First contested: 1991
- Last contested: 2026

Demographics
- Population (2021): 65,811
- Area (km²): 11,709
- Pop. density (per km²): 5.6
- Census division(s): Metro Vancouver, Squamish-Lillooet
- Census subdivision(s): West Vancouver, Squamish, Whistler, Pemberton, Lions Bay, Bowen Island

West Vancouver-Sea to Sky (formerly West Vancouver-Garibaldi) is a provincial electoral district in British Columbia which has been represented in the Legislative Assembly of British Columbia since 1991.

== Demographics ==
Population, 2021	65,811
Population change, 2014–2021	12.1%
Area (km^{2})	11,709
Population density (people per km^{2})	5.6
Population distribution quotients:	
West Vancouver	1
Sea to Sky & West Howe Sound	4.5

== Geography ==
The district was created in 1966 with a boundary that is similar to what it is today. It includes a part of West Vancouver, the West side of Howe Sound, the Sea to Sky region, and the area between the Lillooet and Harrison Lakes. The district is largely overlapped by the traditional territories of the Squamish Nation and St'át'imc Nation.

The district currently includes the section of West Vancouver that is located west of Cypress Creek, Bowen Island, Bowyer Island, Lions Bay, and the Sea-to-Sky communities: Furry Creek, Britannia Beach, Stawamus, Squamish, Whistler, Pemberton, Mount Currie, D'Arcy, and Nquátgue. Its northern section reaches east to the north end of Harrison Lake to include a number of smaller Indigenous communities.

== History ==
The district was created in 1966 as West Vancouver-Howe Sound. It was renamed West Vancouver-Garibaldi in 1988 and then West Vancouver-Sea to Sky in 2008.

== Members of the Legislative Assembly ==
Assembly	Years	Member	Party
West Vancouver-Garibaldi; Riding created from West Vancouver-Howe Sound
35th	1991–1996	David J. Mitchell	Liberal
36th	1996–2001	Ted Nebbeling	Liberal
37th	2001–2005	Ted Nebbeling	Liberal
38th	2005–2009	Joan McIntyre	Liberal
West Vancouver-Sea to Sky
39th	2009–2013	Joan McIntyre	Liberal
40th	2013–2017	Jordan Sturdy	Liberal
41st	2017–2020	Jordan Sturdy	Liberal
42nd	2020–2023	Jordan Sturdy	Liberal
42nd	2023–2024	Jordan Sturdy	BC United
43rd	2024–2026	Jeremy Valeriote	Green
44th	2026–present	Jeremy Valeriote	Green

Since 2024, the riding has been represented by Jeremy Valeriote, a former councillor of Gibsons. He was elected after the previous incumbent, Jordan Sturdy, chose not to run for re-election in the 2024 general election. Valeriote originally ran for election in the riding in 2020, but lost by 60 votes after a judicial recount.

== Election results ==
2026 British Columbia general election
** Preliminary results — Not yet official **
Party	Candidate	Votes	%	±%
Green	Jeremy Valeriote	10,503	47.56	+9.49
Conservative	Ayla Dumais	8,478	38.39	+2.78
New Democratic	Michelle Livaja	2,283	10.34	-15.97
CentreBC	Dan Wood	818	3.70	–
Total valid votes		22,082	99.90	
Total rejected ballots		22	0.10	-0.05
Turnout		22,104		
Registered voters				
Source: Elections BC
Green hold		Swing		+3.35

2024 British Columbia general election
Party	Candidate	Votes	%	±%	Expenditures
Green	Jeremy Valeriote	10,438	38.08	-0.1	$65,275.93
Conservative	Yuri Fulmer	9,762	35.61	–	$86,706
New Democratic	Jen Ford	7,212	26.31	+0.6	$31,452
Total valid votes		27,412	–		
Total rejected ballots					
Turnout					
Registered voters					
Green notional hold		Swing		–	
Source: Elections BC

2020 provincial election redistributed results
Party	%
Green	38.2
Liberal	36.1
New Democratic	25.7

2020 British Columbia general election
Party	Candidate	Votes	%	±%	Expenditures
Liberal	Jordan Sturdy	9,249	37.54	−5.53	$51,349.99
Green	Jeremy Valeriote	9,189	37.30	+8.66	$37,603.39
New Democratic	Keith Murdoch	6,197	25.16	−1.77	$9,806.90
Total valid votes		24,635	99.45	–	
Total rejected ballots		137	0.55	+0.14	
Turnout		24,772	56.89	−4.20	
Registered voters		43,546			
Liberal hold		Swing		–7.10	
Source: Elections BC

Final count following a judicial recount, as the difference between first and second place was within 1/500 of the total votes cast.

2017 British Columbia general election
Party	Candidate	Votes	%	±%	Expenditures
Liberal	Jordan Sturdy	10,449	43.08	−9.39	$67,085
Green	Dana Moore Taylor	6,947	28.64	+17.69	$11,109
New Democratic	Michelle Livaja	6,532	26.93	−5.54	$4,565
Libertarian	Michael Cambridge	186	0.76	–	$250
Independent	Tristan Andrew Galbraith	143	0.59	–	$250
Total valid votes		24,257	100.00	–	
Total rejected ballots		100	0.41	0	
Turnout		24,357	61.09	+4.41	
Registered voters		39,870			
Source: Elections BC

2013 British Columbia general election
Party	Candidate	Votes	%	±%	Expenditures
Liberal	Jordan Sturdy	11,272	52.47	−2.41	$120,399
New Democratic	Ana Santos	6,966	32.47	+10.24	$21,457
Green	Richard Warrington	2,359	10.95	−11.92	$4,200
Conservative	Ian McLeod	653	3.06	–	$621
Independent	Jon Johnson	225	1.04	–	$1,231
Total valid votes		21,478	100.00		
Total rejected ballots		89	0.41		
Turnout		21,567	56.68		
Source: Elections BC

B.C. General Election 2009: West Vancouver-Sea to Sky
Party	Candidate	Votes	%	±	Expenditures
Liberal	Joan McIntyre	10,101	54.91	+4.56	$121,348
Green	Jim Stephenson	4,082	22.19	-4.39	$16,217
New Democratic	Juliana Buitenhuis	4,214	22.90	+1.81	$7,982
Total Valid Votes		18,397	100		
Total Rejected Ballots		130	0.70		
Turnout		18,527	53.07		

B.C. General Election 2005: West Vancouver-Garibaldi
Party	Candidate	Votes	%	±	Expenditures
Liberal	Joan McIntyre	11,808	50.35	-17.83	$95.609
Green	Dennis Stephen Perry	6,235	26.58	+9.28	$43,496
NDP	Lyle Douglas Fenton	4,947	21.09	+10.17	$11,812
Conservative	Barbara Ann Reid	464	1.98	*	$160
Total Valid Votes		23,454	100		
Total Rejected Ballots		142	0.61		
Turnout		23,596	61.57		

B.C. General Election 2001: West Vancouver-Garibaldi
Party	Candidate	Votes	%	±	Expenditures
Liberal	Ted Nebbeling	14,542	68.18%		$64,764
Green	Peter Michael Tatroff	3,691	17.30%	–	$2,584
NDP	Barry MacLeod	2,330	10.92%		$6,450
Marijuana	Robert Adam	767	3.60%		$554
Total Valid Votes		21,330	100.00%		
Total Rejected Ballots		92	0.43%		
Turnout		21,422	68.19%		

B.C. General Election 1996: West Vancouver-Garibaldi
Party	Candidate	Votes	%	±	Expenditures
Liberal	Ted Nebbeling	12,326	57.17%		$39,721
NDP	Brenda Broughton	6,288	29.16%		$33,235
Reform	Jim Mercier	1,430	6.63%		$9,955
Progressive Democrat	Roland T. French	693	3.21%	–	$100
Green	Peggy Stortz	532	2.47%	–	$443
Social Credit	Mike Becker	98	0.45%	–	$3,071
Libertarian	Tunya Audain	91	0.42%	–	None listed
Conservative	Muriel D.E. Down	68	0.32%		$286
Natural Law	David Grayson	36	0.17%		$125
Total Valid Votes		21,562	100.00%		
Total Rejected Ballots		102	0.47%		
Turnout		21,664	73.03%		

B.C. General Election 1991: West Vancouver-Garibaldi
Party	Candidate	Votes	%	±	Expenditures
Liberal	David J. Mitchell	11,182	58.35%		$45,506
NDP	Brian D. Giles	4,506	23.52%		$20,080
Social Credit	Rodney C. Glynn-Morris	3,020	15.76%	–	$47,125
Green	Philip W. F. Millerd	454	2.37%	–	$1,692
Total valid votes		19,162	100.00%		
Total rejected ballots		257	1.32%		
Turnout		19,419	78.60%		

== See also ==
- Vancouver (electoral districts)
- List of British Columbia provincial electoral districts
- Canadian provincial electoral districts
