= New Democratic Party candidates in the 2019 Canadian federal election =

This is a list of New Democratic Party in the 2019 Canadian federal election. The NDP nominated candidates in all of Canada's 338 ridings; 24 of whom were elected.

== Alberta ==
=== Calgary ===
Riding	Candidate's Name	Notes	Residence	Occupation	Votes	%	Rank
Calgary Centre	Jessica Buresi		Calgary	Teacher	6,516	9.89	3rd
Calgary Confederation	Gurcharan Singh Sidhu		Calgary		7,312	11.10	3rd
Calgary Forest Lawn	Joe Pimlott	ANDP candidate for Calgary-Peigan in the 2019 Alberta provincial election	Monterey Park, Calgary		4,227	10.58	3rd
Calgary Heritage	Holly Heffernan	ANDP candidate for Drumheller-Stettler in the 2019 Alberta provincial election	Calgary	Nurse	5,278	9.14	3rd
Calgary Midnapore	Gurmit Bhachu		Canyon Meadows, Calgary	Teacher	6,445	9.47	2nd
Calgary Nose Hill	Patrick King		Crescent Heights, Calgary	App developer	5,304	9.59	3rd
Calgary Rocky Ridge	Nathan LeBlanc Fortin		Calgary		6,051	8.56	3rd
Calgary Shepard	David Brian Smith		Calgary	Union official (UFCW)	6,828	8.74	2nd
Calgary Signal Hill	Khalis Ahmed	NDP candidate in the 2017 Calgary Heritage federal by-election NDP candidate for Calgary Signal Hill in the 2015 federal election	Calgary	Geologist	5,355	8.44	3rd
Calgary Skyview	Gurinder Singh Gill		Saddle Ridge, Calgary	Accountant	7,540	14.92	3rd

=== Edmonton ===
Riding	Candidate's Name	Notes	Residence	Occupation	Votes	%	Rank
Edmonton Centre	Katherine Swampy	NDP candidate for Battle River—Crowfoot in the 2015 federal election	Maskwacis	Civil servant	10,959	20.64	3rd
Edmonton Griesbach	Mark Cherrington		Tweddle Place, Edmonton		11,800	25.13	2nd
Edmonton Manning	Charmaine St. Germain		Edmonton		9,555	17.57	3rd
Edmonton Mill Woods	Nigel Logan	Candidate for Ward 12 in the 2017 Edmonton municipal election	Kiniski Gardens, Edmonton	IT professional	6,422	12.08	3rd
Edmonton Riverbend	Audrey Redman		Edmonton	Social worker	9,332	15.26	3rd
Edmonton Strathcona	Heather McPherson		Argyll, Edmonton		26,823	47.27	1st
Edmonton West	Patrick Steuber		La Perle, Edmonton	Student	8,537	14.56	3rd
Edmonton—Wetaskiwin	Noah Garver		Edmonton	Student	9,820	11.23	3rd
Sherwood Park—Fort Saskatchewan	Aidan Theroux		Fort Saskatchewan	Student	8,867	12.14	2nd
St. Albert—Edmonton	Kathleen Mpulubusi		Northwest Edmonton	Postal worker	9,895	15.20	3rd

=== Rural Alberta ===
Riding	Candidate's Name	Notes	Residence	Occupation	Votes	%	Rank
Banff—Airdrie	Anne Wilson		Canmore	Lawyer	8,185	10.48	3rd
Battle River—Crowfoot	Natasha Fryzuk		Edmonton	Postal worker	3,185	5.11	2nd
Bow River	Lynn Macwilliam	ANDP candidate for Brooks-Medicine Hat in the 2019 Alberta provincial election NDP candidate for Bow River in the 2015 federal election ANDP candidate for Strathmore-Brooks in the 2015 Alberta provincial election	Bassano		3,086	5.60	3rd
Foothills	Mickail Hendi		Calgary	Student	3,767	5.74	3rd
Fort McMurray—Cold Lake	Matthew Gilks	Vice-president of United Food and Commercial Workers 401	Edmonton	Cook	2,883	5.66	3rd
Grande Prairie-Mackenzie	Erin Aylward		Edmonton		4,245	6.96	2nd
Lakeland	Jeffrey Swanson		Edmonton	University student	3,728	6.47	2nd
Lethbridge	Shandi Bleiken		Lethbridge	Administrator	9,110	14.72	2nd
Medicine Hat—Cardston—Warner	Elizabeth Thomson		Medicine Hat		4,639	8.74	2nd
Peace River—Westlock	Jennifer Villebrun	NDP candidate for Peace River in the 2011 federal election Green Party candidate for Peace River in the 2008 federal election	Valleyview	Teacher / lawyer	3,886	7.52	2nd
Red Deer—Lacombe	Lauren Pezzella		Red Deer	Student	6,012	8.91	2nd
Red Deer—Mountain View	Logan Garbanewski		Penhold		4,946	7.26	2nd
Sturgeon River—Parkland	Guy Desforges	NDP candidate for Sturgeon River—Parkland in the 2015 federal election	Spruce Grove	Union leader (Unifor)	6,940	10.11	2nd
Yellowhead	Kristine Bowman		Edmonton	Postal worker	3,898	6.96	2nd

== British Columbia ==
=== British Columbia Interior ===
Riding	Candidate's Name	Notes	Residence	Occupation	Votes	%	Rank
Cariboo—Prince George	Heather Sapergia		Prince George		8,440	15.41	3rd
Central Okanagan—Similkameen—Nicola	Joan Phillip		Penticton	Land manager for the Penticton Indian Band	10,904	16.79	3rd
Kamloops—Thompson—Cariboo	Cynthia Egli		Kamloops		9,936	13.71	3rd
Kelowna—Lake Country	Justin Kulik		Kelowna		8,381	12.13	3rd
Kootenay—Columbia	Wayne Stetski	Member of Parliament for Kootenay—Columbia (2015–2019); Mayor of Cranbrook (2011–2014)	Cranbrook	Park manager	23,149	34.38	2nd
North Okanagan—Shuswap	Harwinder Sandhu	BC NDP candidate for Kelowna-Mission in the 2017 British Columbia provincial election	Coldstream	Nurse	11,353	13.51	3rd
Prince George—Peace River—Northern Rockies	Marcia Luccock		Kamloops	Professor	5,069	9.19	3rd
Skeena—Bulkley Valley	Taylor Bachrach	Mayor of Smithers (2011–2019)	Smithers	Small business owner	16,944	40.94	1st
South Okanagan—West Kootenay	Richard Cannings	Member of Parliament for South Okanagan—West Kootenay (2015–present)	Penticton	Biologist	24,809	36.38	1st

=== Fraser Valley/Lower Mainland ===
Riding	Candidate's Name	Notes	Residence	Occupation	Votes	%	Rank
Abbotsford	Madeleine Sauve		Abbotsford		8,257	16.87	3rd
Burnaby North—Seymour	Svend Robinson	Member of Parliament for Burnaby—Douglas (1997–2004); Member of Parliament for Burnaby—Kingsway (1988–1997); Member of Parliament for Burnaby (1979–1988)	Burnaby	Lawyer	16,185	32.33	2nd
Burnaby South	Jagmeet Singh	Leader of the New Democratic Party (2017–2025); Member of Parliament for Burnaby South (2019–2025); Member of the Legislative Assembly of Ontario for Bramalea—Gore—Malton (2011–2017)	Burnaby	Lawyer	16,956	37.67	1st
Chilliwack—Hope	Heather McQuillan		Burnaby		8,957	16.66	3rd
Cloverdale—Langley City	Rae Banwarie		Surrey		10,508	18.94	3rd
Coquitlam—Port Coquitlam	Christina Gower		Port Coquitlam	Nurse	13,383	23.00	3rd
Delta	Randy Anderson-Fennell		Delta	Electrician	8,792	16.29	3rd
Fleetwood—Port Kells	Annie Ohana		Surrey		10,569	21.46	3rd
Langley—Aldergrove	Stacey Wakelin		Langley		10,690	16.85	3rd
Mission—Matsqui—Fraser Canyon	Michael Nenn		Mission	Project manager	8,089	17.56	3rd
New Westminster—Burnaby	Peter Julian	Member of Parliament for New Westminster—Burnaby (2015–2025); Member of Parliament for Burnaby—New Westminster (2004–2015)	New Westminster		23,437	44.24	1st
North Vancouver	Justine Bell		North Vancouver	Policy analyst	10,340	16.43	3rd
Pitt Meadows—Maple Ridge	John Mogk		Maple Ridge	Therapist	12,958	23.89	3rd
Port Moody—Coquitlam	Bonita Zarrillo	Member of Coquitlam City Council (2013–2021)	Coquitlam		16,702	30.93	2nd
Richmond Centre	Dustin Innes		Richmond		5,617	14.47	3rd
South Surrey—White Rock	Stephen Crozier		White Rock	Teacher	6,716	11.57	3rd
Steveston—Richmond East	Jaeden Dela Torre		Richmond	Student	6,321	15.07	3rd
Surrey Centre	Sarjit Singh Saran		Surrey	Human resources professional	11,353	27.48	2nd
Surrey—Newton	Harjit Singh Gill		Surrey	Radio broadcaster	12,306	29.23	2nd
Vancouver Centre	Breen Ouellette		Vancouver	Lawyer	13,280	23.74	2nd
Vancouver East	Jenny Kwan	Member of Parliament for Vancouver East (2015–present); Member of the British Columbia Legislative Assembly for Vancouver-Mount Pleasant (1996–2015)	Kitsilano, Vancouver		29,236	52.57	1st
Vancouver Granville	Yvonne Hanson		Riley Park, Vancouver		16,619	13.12	4th
Vancouver Kingsway	Don Davies	Member of Parliament for Vancouver Kingsway (2008–present)	Kensington–Cedar Cottage, Vancouver	Lawyer	21,680	49.09	1st
Vancouver Quadra	Leigh Kenny		West Point Grey, Vancouver		7,681	15.13	3rd
Vancouver South	Sean McQuillan		Burnaby		8,015	18.56	3rd
West Vancouver—Sunshine Coast—Sea to Sky Country	Judith Wilson		Gibsons	Lawyer	9,027	13.89	4th

=== Vancouver Island ===
Riding	Candidate's Name	Notes	Residence	Occupation	Votes	%	Rank
Courtenay—Alberni	Gord Johns	Member of Parliament for Courtenay—Alberni (2015–present); Member of Tofino Town Council (2008–2011)	Port Alberni	Small business owner	29,790	41.21	1st
Cowichan—Malahat—Langford	Alistair MacGregor	Member of Parliament for Cowichan—Malahat—Langford (2015–2025)	Duncan	Executive assistant	23,519	36.06	1st
Esquimalt—Saanich—Sooke	Randall Garrison	Member of Parliament for Esquimalt—Saanich—Sooke (2015–2025); Member of Parliament for Esquimalt—Juan de Fuca (2011–2015)	Esquimalt	Professor at Camosun College	23,887	34.06	1st
Nanaimo—Ladysmith	Bob Chamberlin		Ladysmith	Consultant	16,985	23.63	3rd
North Island—Powell River	Rachel Blaney	Member of Parliament for North Island—Powell River (2015–2025)	Campbell River	Non-profit executive	23,834	37.88	1st
Saanich—Gulf Islands	Sabina Singh		Victoria	University professor	8,657	12.70	4th
Victoria	Laurel Collins	Member of Victoria City Council (2018–2019)	Victoria	Professor at the University of Victoria	23,765	33.21	1st

== Manitoba ==
=== Rural Manitoba ===
Riding	Candidate's Name	Notes	Residence	Occupation	Votes	%	Rank
Brandon—Souris	Ashley Duguay		Brandon		5,805	14.09	2nd
Churchill—Keewatinook Aski	Niki Ashton	Member of Parliament for Churchill—Keewatinook Aski (2008–present); Candidate in the 2017 New Democratic Party leadership election	Thompson	University lecturer, researcher	11,919	50.32	1st
Dauphin—Swan River—Neepawa	Laverne Lewycky	Member of Parliament for Dauphin (1980–1984)	Dauphin		5,724	14.11	2nd
Portage—Lisgar	Cindy Friesen	Manitoba NDP candidate for Midland in the 2019 Manitoba provincial election	Winnipeg	Administrator	3,872	8.67	3rd
Provencher	Erin McGee	Manitoba NDP candidate for La Verendrye in the 2019 Manitoba provincial election	Île-des-Chênes		6,187	12.81	3rd
Selkirk—Interlake—Eastman	Robert A. Smith		St. Andrews	Beekeeper	8,873	17.89	2nd

=== Winnipeg ===
Riding	Candidate's Name	Notes	Residence	Occupation	Votes	%	Rank
Charleswood—St. James—Assiniboia—Headingley	Ken St. George		Winnipeg	Nurse	6,556	14.18	3rd
Elmwood–Transcona	Daniel Blaikie	Member of Parliament for Elmwood–Transcona (2015–2024)	Kern Park, Winnipeg	Electrician	19,786	45.63	1st
Kildonan—St. Paul	Evan Krosney		Winnipeg		9,387	21.19	3rd
Saint Boniface—Saint Vital	Billie Cross	Manitoba NDP candidate for Lagimodière in the 2019 Manitoba provincial election	Winnipeg	Teacher	8,037	16.98	3rd
Winnipeg Centre	Leah Gazan		Winnipeg		13,073	41.21	1st
Winnipeg North	Kyle Mason		Luxton, Winnipeg		8,469	25.87	2nd
Winnipeg South	Jean-Paul Lapointe		Winnipeg	IT professional	6,678	13.94	3rd
Winnipeg South Centre	Elizabeth Shearer		Winnipeg	Administrator	8,965	17.70	3rd

== New Brunswick ==
Riding	Candidate's Name	Notes	Residence	Occupation	Votes	%	Rank
Acadie—Bathurst	Daniel Thériault		Caraquet	Manager	6,967	14.47	3rd
Beauséjour	Jean-Marc Bélanger		Grande-Digue	Professor	3,940	7.34	4th
Fredericton	Mackenzie Thomason	Interim Leader of the New Brunswick New Democratic Party (2019–2020)	Fredericton		2,946	5.96	4th
Fundy Royal	James Tolan		Quispamsis		4,804	9.88	4th
Madawaska—Restigouche	Chad Betteridge		Toronto	Librarian	2,212	6.42	4th
Miramichi—Grand Lake	Eileen Clancy Teslenko		Miramichi	Sales professional	2,875	8.31	4th
Moncton—Riverview—Dieppe	Luke MacLaren		Riverview	Non-profit worker	6,164	11.89	4th
New Brunswick Southwest	Douglas Mullin	NB NDP candidate for Miramichi in the 2018 New Brunswick provincial election	Sunny Corner		3,251	8.21	4th
Saint John—Rothesay	Armand Cormier		Oromocto	Software developer	5,046	12.23	3rd
Tobique—Mactaquac	Megan Aiken		Edmonton	Student	3,007	7.87	4th

== Newfoundland and Labrador ==
Riding	Candidate's Name	Notes	Residence	Occupation	Votes	%	Rank
Avalon	Lea Mary Movelle		St. John's		7,142	17.28	3rd
Bonavista—Burin—Trinity	Matthew Cooper	NL NDP candidate for Waterford Valley in the 2019 Newfoundland and Labrador provincial election	St. John's	Student	3,855	11.98	3rd
Coast of Bays—Central—Notre Dame	Noel Joe		Conne River		4,224	12.36	3rd
Labrador	Michelene Gray		Labrador City		2,796	24.49	3rd
Long Range Mountains	Holly Pike		Corner Brook	Professor	7,609	19.80	3rd
St. John's East	Jack Harris	Member of Parliament for St. John's East (2008–2015 & 1987–1988); Leader of the Newfoundland and Labrador New Democratic Party (1992–2006); Member of the Newfoundland and Labrador House of Assembly for Signal Hill-Quidi Vidi (1996–2006); Member of the Newfoundland and Labrador House of Assembly for St. John's East (1990–1996)	St. John's		21,148	46.92	1st
St. John's South—Mount Pearl	Anne Marie Anonsen		St. John's		10,890	26.78	2nd

== Nova Scotia ==
Riding	Candidate's Name	Notes	Residence	Occupation	Votes	%	Rank
Cape Breton—Canso	Laurie Suitor		River Bourgeois	Therapist	6,354	14.80	3rd
Central Nova	Betsy MacDonald		Antigonish		5,806	13.06	3rd
Cumberland—Colchester	Larry Duchesne	Leader of the New Democratic Party of Prince Edward Island (1991–1995)	Oxford Junction	Teacher	5,451	11.99	4th
Dartmouth—Cole Harbour	Emma Norton		Dartmouth	Policy analyst	14,435	26.98	2nd
Halifax	Christine Saulnier		Halifax	Non-profit director	16,747	30.04	2nd
Halifax West	Jacob Wilson		Bedford, Halifax	Glazier	10,429	19.19	3rd
Kings—Hants	Stephen Schneider	NS NDP candidate for Kings South in the 2017 Nova Scotia provincial election	Wolfville	Professor	8,254	17.18	3rd
Sackville—Preston—Chezzetcook	Matt Stickland		Lawrencetown		11,860	23.94	2nd
South Shore—St. Margarets	Jessika Hepburn		Lunenburg	Small business owner	8,361	15.92	3rd
Sydney—Victoria	Jodi McDavid		Sydney	Small business owner	8,146	20.08	3rd
West Nova	Matthew Dubois		Granville Ferry		5,010	10.71	4th

== Ontario ==
=== Central Ontario ===
Riding	Candidate's Name	Notes	Residence	Occupation	Votes	%	Rank
Barrie—Innisfil	Pekka Reinio	ONDP candidate for Barrie—Innisfil in the 2018 Ontario provincial election	Barrie	Teacher	8,880	16.37	3rd
Barrie—Springwater—Oro-Medonte	Dan Janssen	ONDP candidate for Barrie—Springwater—Oro-Medonte in the 2018 Ontario provincial election	Barrie		7,972	14.82	3rd
Dufferin—Caledon	Allison Brown		Brampton	Nurse	7,981	11.63	3rd
Durham	Sarah Whalen-Wright		Bowmanville	Teacher	13,323	18.25	3rd
Haliburton—Kawartha Lakes—Brock	Barbara Doyle		Lindsay	Museum manager	9,676	14.71	3rd
Northumberland—Peterborough South	Mallory MacDonald		Peterborough	Nurse	9,615	13.94	3rd
Peterborough—Kawartha	Candace Shaw		Peterborough		11,872	17.01	3rd
Simcoe—Grey	Ilona Matthews		Wasaga Beach	Small business owner	8,462	11.21	4th
Simcoe North	Angelique Belcourt		Midland	Student	8,850	14.10	3rd
York—Simcoe	Jessa McLean		Sutton		7,620	14.17	3rd

=== Eastern Ontario/Ottawa ===
Riding	Candidate's Name	Notes	Residence	Occupation	Votes	%	Rank
Bay of Quinte	Stephanie Bell		Picton		9,851	16.01	3rd
Carleton	Kevin Hua		Stittsville, Ottawa	Student (Carleton University)	6,479	9.34	3rd
Glengarry—Prescott—Russell	Konstantine Malakos		Sainte-Justine-de-Newton		6,851	10.41	3rd
Hastings—Lennox and Addington	David Tough		Peterborough		6,984	13.15	3rd
Kanata—Carleton	Melissa Coenraad		Kanata, Ottawa	Laboratory technician	8,317	12.46	2nd
Kingston and the Islands	Barrington Walker		Kingston	Professor	15,856	23.25	2nd
Lanark—Frontenac—Kingston	Satinka Schilling		Perth	Baker	8,835	14.14	3rd
Leeds—Grenville—Thousand Islands and Rideau Lakes	Michelle Taylor	ONDP candidate for Leeds—Grenville—Thousand Islands and Rideau Lakes in the 2018 Ontario provincial election	Athens		8,201	14.03	3rd
Nepean	Zaff Ansari		Ottawa	Consultant	9,104	13.08	3rd
Orléans	Jacqui Wiens		Orleans, Ottawa	Student	9,428	11.58	3rd
Ottawa Centre	Emilie Taman	NDP candidate for Ottawa—Vanier in the 2015 federal election	Old Ottawa South	Lawyer	22,916	29.04	2nd
Ottawa South	Morgan Gay		Alta Vista, Ottawa	Union negotiator (PSAC)	10,457	16.00	3rd
Ottawa—Vanier	Stéphanie Mercier		Gatineau	Nurse	13,516	21.16	2nd
Ottawa West—Nepean	Angella MacEwen		Centretown, Ottawa	Economist	11,646	18.72	3rd
Renfrew—Nipissing—Pembroke	Eileen Jones-Whyte		Eganville	Teacher	8,786	14.90	3rd
Stormont—Dundas—South Glengarry	Kelsey Catherine Schmitz		Cornwall		7,674	14.29	3rd

=== Greater Toronto Area ===
Riding	Candidate's Name	Notes	Residence	Occupation	Votes	%	Rank
Ajax	Shokat Malik		Ajax	Real estate agent	7,033	11.53	3rd
Aurora—Oak Ridges—Richmond Hill	Aaron Brown		Richmond Hill	Student	3,820	7.19	3rd
Beaches—East York	Mae J. Nam		Toronto	Lawyer	12,196	21.37	2nd
Brampton Centre	Jordan Boswell		Brampton	Tour guide	7,819	19.67	3rd
Brampton East	Saranjit Singh		Brampton	Lawyer	13,368	26.34	2nd
Brampton North	Melissa Edwards		Brampton		8,533	16.90	3rd
Brampton South	Mandeep Kaur		Caledon		7,985	16.40	3rd
Brampton West	Navjit Kaur		Brampton	Respiratory therapist	9,855	18.36	3rd
Burlington	Lenaee Dupuis		Burlington	Human resources professional	7,372	10.24	3rd
Davenport	Andrew Cash	Member of Parliament for Davenport (2011–2015)	Dovercourt Park, Toronto		21,812	41.02	2nd
Don Valley East	Nicholas Thompson		Thorncliffe Park, Toronto	Union official (Public Service Alliance of Canada)	4,647	10.99	3rd
Don Valley North	Bruce Griffin		Toronto	Musician	4,285	9.20	3rd
Don Valley West	Laurel MacDowell		Toronto		3,804	7.28	3rd
Eglinton—Lawrence	Alexandra Nash		Ledbury Park, Toronto	Student	4,741	8.47	3rd
Etobicoke Centre	Heather Vickers-Wong		Etobicoke		4,881	7.72	3rd
Etobicoke—Lakeshore	Branko Gasperlin		Etobicoke		8,277	11.91	3rd
Etobicoke North	Naiima Farah		Jamestown, Toronto	Social worker	4,654	10.84	3rd
Humber River—Black Creek	Maria Augimeri		Amesbury, Toronto	Civil servant	7,198	18.96	2nd
King—Vaughan	Emilio Bernardo-Ciddio		Maple, Vaughan	Sales professional	4,297	6.73	3rd
Markham—Stouffville	Hal Berman	NDP candidate for York Centre in the 2015 federal election	Toronto	Physician	4,132	6.42	3rd
Markham—Thornhill	Paul Sahbaz		Markham	Fundraiser	3,264	7.29	3rd
Markham—Unionville	Gregory Hines	NDP candidate for Markham—Stouffville in the 2015 federal election	Whitchurch-Stouffville	Small business owner	3,524	6.60	3rd
Milton	Farina Hassan		Oakville		3,851	6.45	3rd
Mississauga Centre	Sarah Walji		Mississauga	Nurse	5,173	9.62	3rd
Mississauga East—Cooksville	Tom Takacs	ONDP candidate for Mississauga East—Cooksville in the 2018 Ontario provincial election	Woodbridge	Electrician	4,643	8.82	3rd
Mississauga—Erin Mills	Salman Tariq		Mississauga	Self-employed	5,236	8.99	3rd
Mississauga—Lakeshore	Adam Laughton		Mississauga		5,103	8.37	3rd
Mississauga—Malton	Nikki Clarke	ONDP candidate for Mississauga—Malton in the 2018 Ontario provincial election	Eringate-Centennial-West Deane, Toronto		6,103	12.57	3rd
Newmarket—Aurora	Yvonne Kelly	NDP candidate for Newmarket—Aurora in the 2015 federal election	Tottenham	Social worker	6,576	10.70	3rd
Oakville	Jerome Adamo		Oakville		4,928	7.54	3rd
Oakville North—Burlington	Nicolas Dion		Hamilton	Manager	5,866	8.43	3rd
Oshawa	Shailene Panylo		Oshawa		17,668	28.50	2nd
Parkdale—High Park	Paul M. Taylor		Roncesvalles, Toronto		19,180	31.50	2nd
Pickering—Uxbridge	Eileen Higdon		Pickering	Nurse	7,582	11.94	3rd
Scarborough—Agincourt	Larisa Julius		Scarborough, Toronto	Student	3,636	8.70	3rd
Scarborough Centre	Faiz Kamal		London		5,452	11.71	3rd
Scarborough—Guildwood	Michelle Spencer		Scarborough City Centre, Toronto		4,806	11.24	3rd
Scarborough North	Yan Chen		Toronto	Student	5,039	12.91	3rd
Scarborough—Rouge Park	Kingsley Kwok		Malvern, Toronto	Respiratory therapist	5,801	11.50	3rd
Scarborough Southwest	Keith McCrady		Cliffside, Toronto		7,865	15.53	3rd
Spadina—Fort York	Diana Yoon		Toronto		12,188	20.1	2nd
Richmond Hill	Adam DeVita	NDP candidate for Richmond Hill in the 2015 federal election ONDP candidate for Richmond Hill in the 2014 and 2011 provincial elections	Richmond Hill	Engineer	4,425	8.82	3rd
Thornhill	Sara Petruci		Etobicoke, Toronto	Student	3,469	6.48	3rd
Toronto Centre	Brian Chang		Toronto		12,142	22.27	2nd
Toronto—Danforth	Min Sook Lee		Leslieville, Toronto		19,283	33.21	2nd
Toronto—St. Paul's	Alok Mukherjee		Humewood, Toronto		9,442	15.78	3rd
University—Rosedale	Melissa Jean-Baptiste Vajda		Toronto	Lawyer	12,573	21.91	2nd
Vaughan—Woodbridge	Peter DeVita		Richmond Hill	Engineer	3,910	7.77	3rd
Whitby	Brian Dias		Toronto	Factory worker	9,760	14.12	3rd
Willowdale	Leah Kalsi		North York, Toronto		4,231	9.31	3rd
York Centre	Andrea Vásquez Jiménez	ONDP candidate for York Centre in the 2018 Ontario provincial election	North York, Toronto	Student	4,251	9.84	3rd
York South—Weston	Yafet Tewelde		York, Toronto	Researcher	7,754	17.44	3rd

=== Hamilton/Niagara ===
Riding	Candidate's Name	Notes	Residence	Occupation	Votes	%	Rank
Flamborough—Glanbrook	Allison Cillis		Binbrook, Hamilton	Teacher	10,322	16.50	3rd
Hamilton Centre	Matthew Green	Member of Hamilton City Council (2014–2018)	Hamilton		20,368	46.16	1st
Hamilton East—Stoney Creek	Nick Milanovic		Stoney Creek	Lawyer	14,930	28.63	2nd
Hamilton Mountain	Scott Duvall	Member of Parliament for Hamilton Mountain (2015–2021)	Hamilton		19,135	36.14	1st
Hamilton West—Ancaster—Dundas	Yousaf Malik		Ancaster	Policy analyst	11,527	17.76	3rd
Niagara Centre	Malcolm Allen	Member of Parliament for Welland (2008–2015)	Welland	Electrician	15,469	26.69	3rd
Niagara Falls	Brian Barker		Niagara Falls	Teacher	12,566	18.02	3rd
Niagara West	Nameer Rahman	NDP candidate for Niagara West in the 2015 federal election	Grimsby		6,540	12.13	3rd
St. Catharines	Dennis Van Meer		St. Catharines	Steelworker	12,431	20.68	3rd

=== Northern Ontario ===
Riding	Candidate's Name	Notes	Residence	Occupation	Votes	%	Rank
Algoma—Manitoulin—Kapuskasing	Carol Hughes	Member of Parliament for Algoma—Manitoulin—Kapuskasing (2008–present)	Hanmer		16,883	41.59	1st
Kenora	Rudy Turtle		Grassy Narrows		7,923	28.51	3rd
Nickel Belt	Stéphane Paquette		Hanmer		15,656	32.05	2nd
Nipissing—Timiskaming	Rob Boulet		North Bay	IT professional	9,784	20.50	3rd
Parry Sound—Muskoka	Tom Young		Bracebridge		6,417	11.74	4th
Sault Ste. Marie	Sara McCleary		Sault Ste. Marie	Non-profit worker	9,459	22.68	3rd
Sudbury	Beth Mairs		Worthington, Sudbury		13,885	28.94	2nd
Thunder Bay—Rainy River	Yuk-Sem Won		Thunder Bay	Teacher	11,944	29.10	3rd
Thunder Bay—Superior North	Anna Betty Achneepineskum		Thunder Bay		9,126	21.14	2nd
Timmins—James Bay	Charlie Angus	Member of Parliament for Timmins—James Bay (2004–2025)	Cobalt	Musician / Writer	14,885	40.51	1st

=== Southwestern Ontario ===
Riding	Candidate's Name	Notes	Residence	Occupation	Votes	%	Rank
Brantford—Brant	Sabrina Sawyer		Brantford	Teacher	13,131	19.70	3rd
Bruce—Grey—Owen Sound	Chris Stephen		Chesley	Labourer	6,666	11.59	3rd
Cambridge	Scott Hamilton		Cambridge		11,177	19.29	3rd
Chatham-Kent—Leamington	Tony Walsh	NDP candidate for Chatham-Kent—Leamington in the 2015 federal election	Chatham-Kent	President of Chatham-Kent United Way	8,229	15.2	3rd
Elgin—Middlesex—London	Bob Hargreaves		Aylmer		11,019	17.84	3rd
Essex	Tracey Ramsey	Member of Parliament for Essex (2015–2019)	Belle River		23,603	34.56	2nd
Guelph	Aisha Jahangir		Guelph	Nurse	9,297	12.30	4th
Haldimand—Norfolk	Adrienne Roberts		Brantford	Teacher	9,192	15.34	3rd
Huron—Bruce	Tony McQuail		Lucknow	Farmer	7,421	12.19	3rd
Kitchener Centre	Andrew Moraga		Kitchener	Scientist	6,238	11.27	4th
Kitchener—Conestoga	Riani De Wet		Waterloo	Teacher	5,204	10.10	3rd
Kitchener South—Hespeler	Wasai Rahimi		Kitchener		6,945	13.30	3rd
Lambton—Kent—Middlesex	Dylan Mclay		Tupperville	Sales professional	9,355	16.02	3rd
London—Fanshawe	Lindsay Mathyssen		London		22,671	40.79	1st
London North Centre	Dirka Prout		London	Engineer	14,887	23.36	3rd
London West	Shawna Lewkowitz		London	Instructor	15,220	21.35	3rd
Oxford	Matthew Chambers		Ingersoll		12,306	20.21	3rd
Perth—Wellington	Geoff Krauter		Stratford, Ontario		8,094	14.64	3rd
Sarnia—Lambton	Adam Kilner		Sarnia	United Church minister	12,644	21.83	2nd
Waterloo	Lori Campbell		Waterloo		9,710	15.24	3rd
Wellington—Halton Hills	Andrew Bascombe		Acton	Small business owner/construction worker	6,499	9.33	4th
Windsor—Tecumseh	Cheryl Hardcastle	Member of Parliament for Windsor—Tecumseh (2015–2019)	Tecumseh		18,417	32.33	2nd
Windsor West	Brian Masse	Member of Parliament for Windsor West (2002–present); Member of Windsor City Council (1997–2002)	Windsor		20,800	40.03	1st

== Prince Edward Island ==
Riding	Candidate's Name	Notes	Residence	Occupation	Votes	%	Rank
Cardigan	Lynne Thiele		Stratford	Teacher	1,481	6.68	4th
Charlottetown	Joe Byrne	Leader of the New Democratic Party of Prince Edward Island (2018–2020)			2,238	11.24	4th
Egmont	Sharon Dunn		O'Leary		1,230	6.10	4th
Malpeque	Craig Nash		Charlottetown	Security guard	1,495	6.49	4th

== Quebec ==
=== Central Quebec ===
Riding	Candidate's Name	Notes	Residence	Occupation	Votes	%	Rank
Bécancour—Nicolet—Saurel	Carole Lennard		Montreal		2,732	5.22	4th
Berthier—Maskinongé	Ruth Ellen Brosseau	Member of Parliament for Berthier—Maskinongé (2011–2019)	Yamachiche		19,698	34.95	2nd
Joliette	Julienne Soumaoro		Montreal	Teacher	2,623	4.55	4th
Montcalm	Julian Bonello-Stauch		Montreal		3,514	6.41	4th
Portneuf—Jacques-Cartier	David-Roger Gagnon		Montreal		3,758	5.81	4th
Repentigny	Meryem Benslimane		Montreal		4,470	6.83	4th
Saint-Maurice—Champlain	Barthélémy Boisguérin		Montreal		3,071	5.26	4th
Trois-Rivières	Robert Aubin	Member of Parliament for Trois-Rivières (2011–2019)	Trois-Rivières	Teacher	10,090	16.67	4th

=== Eastern Townships/Southern Quebec ===
Riding	Candidate's Name	Notes	Residence	Occupation	Votes	%	Rank
Beauce	François Jacques-Côté		Saint-Elzéar	Social worker	1,847	3.11	5th
Brome—Missisquoi	Sylvie Jetté		Saint-Étienne-de-Bolton	Professor	4,887	7.95	4th
Châteauguay—Lacolle	Marika Lalime		Montreal	Student	4,005	7.64	4th
Compton—Stanstead	Naomie Mathieu Chauvette		Sherbrooke	Student	5,607	9.63	4th
Drummond	François Choquette	Member of Parliament for Drummond (2011–2019)	Drummondville	Teacher	8,716	15.90	4th
Mégantic—L'Érable	Mathieu Boisvert		Sainte-Catherine		1,936	4.08	5th
Richmond—Arthabaska	Olivier Guérin		Montreal		2,864	4.88	5th
Saint-Hyacinthe—Bagot	Brigitte Sansoucy	Member of Parliament for Saint-Hyacinthe—Bagot (2015–2019); Member of Saint-Hyacinthe City Council (2009–2015)	Saint-Hyacinthe		10,297	18.42	3rd
Saint-Jean	Chantal Reeves		Montreal	Communications professional	4,794	7.75	4th
Salaberry—Suroît	Joan Gottman		Très-Saint-Rédempteur		5,024	7.99	4th
Shefford	Raymonde Plamondon		Saint-Valérien-de-Milton		3,705	6.08	4th
Sherbrooke	Pierre-Luc Dusseault	Member of Parliament for Sherbrooke (2011–2019)	Sherbrooke		16,881	28.26	2nd

=== Greater Montreal ===
Riding	Candidate's Name	Notes	Residence	Occupation	Votes	%	Rank
Ahuntsic-Cartierville	Zahia El-Masri		Cartierville, Montreal	Communications professional	6,284	11.40	3rd
Alfred-Pellan	Andriana Kocini		Laval		4,109	7.57	4th
Beloeil—Chambly	Matthew Dubé	Member of Parliament for Beloeil—Chambly (2015–2019); Member of Parliament for Chambly—Borduas (2011–2015)			10,086	14.51	3rd
Bourassa	Konrad Lamour		Montreal		3,204	7.94	3rd
Brossard—Saint-Lambert	Marc Audet		Saint-Lambert	Manager	5,410	9.55	4th
Dorval—Lachine—LaSalle	Lori Morrison		Dorval		6,207	11.81	3rd
Hochelaga	Catheryn Roy-Goyette		Hochelaga-Maisonneuve, Montreal		11,451	21.59	3rd
Honoré-Mercier	Chu Anh Pham		Anjou, Montreal	Journalist	4,130	8.20	4th
La Pointe-de-l'Île	Ève Péclet	Member of Parliament for La Pointe-de-l'Île (2011–2015)	Outremont, Montreal	Lawyer	6,057	10.91	3rd
La Prairie	Victoria Hernandez		La Prairie	Lawyer	4,744	7.71	4th
Lac-Saint-Louis	Dana Chevalier		Sainte-Anne-de-Bellevue	Lawyer	7,263	12.20	3rd
LaSalle—Émard—Verdun	Steven Scott		Montreal	Professor	8,628	16.47	3rd
Laurier—Sainte-Marie	Nimâ Machouf		Montreal	Epidemiologist	13,453	25.19	2nd
Laval—Les Îles	Noémia Onofre De Lima		Laval	Businesswoman	4,803	8.90	4th
Longueuil—Charles-LeMoyne	Kalden Dhatsenpa				5,289	10.26	3rd
Longueuil—Saint-Hubert	Éric Ferland	Member of Frelighsburg City Council (2005–2009 & 1998–2002); Leader of the Green Party of Quebec (1994–1996)		Non-profit manager	5,104	8.53	4th
Marc-Aurèle-Fortin	Ali Faour		Laval	Businessman	4,741	8.49	4th
Montarville	Djaouida Sellah	Member of Parliament for Saint-Bruno—Saint-Hubert (2011–2015)	Longueuil	Physician	4,984	8.41	3rd
Mont Royal	Eric-Abel Baland		Vieux Rosement, Montreal		3,609	8.26	3rd
Notre-Dame-de-Grâce—Westmount	Franklin Gertler		Notre-Dame-de-Grâce, Montreal	Lawyer	7,753	15.41	2nd
Outremont	Andrea Clarke		Montreal		8,319	20.07	2nd
Papineau	Christine Paré		Park Extension, Montreal		9,748	19.20	2nd
Pierre-Boucher—Les Patriotes—Verchères	Sean English		Montreal	Copywriter	4,192	6.90	4th
Pierrefonds—Dollard	Bruno Ibrahim El-Khoury		Montreal	Professor	5,687	10.25	3rd
Rivière-des-Mille-Îles	Joseph Hakizimana		Mirabel	Healthcare services manager	5,002	8.60	3rd
Rosemont—La Petite-Patrie	Alexandre Boulerice	Deputy Leader of the New Democratic Party (2019–present); Member of Parliament for Rosemont—La Petite-Patrie (2011–present)	Montreal	Journalist	25,575	42.48	1st
Saint-Laurent	Miranda Gallo		Saint-Laurent, Montreal		4,065	10.13	3rd
Saint-Léonard—Saint-Michel	Paulina Ayala	Member of Parliament for Honoré-Mercier (2011–2015)	Nouveau-Rosemont, Montreal	Teacher	2,964	6.52	4th
Terrebonne	Maxime Beaudoin		Montreal		4,627	7.54	4th
Thérèse-De Blainville	Hannah Wolker		Kanesatake	Cashier	4,431	7.57	4th
Vaudreuil—Soulanges	Amanda MacDonald		Hudson	Comedian	7,368	10.81	4th
Ville-Marie—Le Sud-Ouest—Île-des-Sœurs	Sophie Thiébaut		Pointe-Saint-Charles, Montreal		8,274	15.75	2nd
Vimy	Vassif Aliev		Parc Molson, Montreal		4,779	8.61	4th

=== Northern Quebec ===
Riding	Candidate's Name	Notes	Residence	Occupation	Votes	%	Rank
Abitibi—Baie-James—Nunavik—Eeyou	Jacline Rouleau		Senneterre	Restaurant owner	4,104	12.96	4th
Abitibi—Témiscamingue	Alain Guimond		Lorrainville		5,093	10.15	4th
Chicoutimi—Le Fjord	Stéphane Girard		Chicoutimi	Teacher	2,855	6.51	4th
Jonquière	Karine Trudel	Member of Parliament for Jonquière (2015–2019)	Saguenay		12,141	24.59	2nd
Lac-Saint-Jean	Jean-Simon Fortin				2,753	5.08	4th
Manicouagan	Colleen McCool		Montreal		1,482	3.67	4th

=== Quebec City/Gaspe/Eastern Quebec ===
Riding	Candidate's Name	Notes	Residence	Occupation	Votes	%	Rank
Avignon—La Mitis—Matane—Matapédia	Rémi-Jocelyn Côté		Sainte-Luce	Sales professional	1,435	3.99	4th
Beauport—Côte-de-Beaupré—Île d'Orléans—Charlevoix	Gérard Briand		Montreal		2,841	5.61	4th
Beauport—Limoilou	Simon-Pierre Beaudet		Quebec City	Teacher	5,599	11.16	4th
Bellechasse—Les Etchemins—Lévis	Khuon Chamroeun		Lévis	Dentist	3,256	5.05	4th
Charlesbourg—Haute-Saint-Charles	Guillaume Bourdeau		Quebec City		4,554	7.71	4th
Gaspésie—Les Îles-de-la-Madeleine	Lynn Beaulieu		Cap-au-Renard		1,722	4.49	4th
Lévis—Lotbinière	Christel Marchand		Montreal	Communication professional	4,355	6.86	4th
Louis-Hébert	Jérémie Juneau		Quebec City	Student	4,884	7.87	4th
Louis-Saint-Laurent	Colette Amram Ducharme		Quebec City		4,339	6.62	4th
Montmagny—L'Islet—Kamouraska—Rivière-du-Loup	Hugo Latulippe		Cacouna	Filmmaker	3,481	6.91	4th
Québec	Tommy Bureau		Saint-Roch, Quebec City	Union official (Centrale des syndicats du Québec)	6,220	11.48	4th
Rimouski-Neigette—Témiscouata—Les Basques	Guy Caron	Member of Parliament for Rimouski-Neigette—Témiscouata—Les Basques (2015–2019); Candidate in the 2017 New Democratic Party leadership election	Rimouski		13,050	28.51	2nd

=== Western Quebec/Laurentides/Outaouais ===
Riding	Candidate's Name	Notes	Residence	Occupation	Votes	%	Rank
Argenteuil—La Petite-Nation	Charlotte Boucher Smoley		Gatineau		3,758	7.52	4th
Gatineau	Eric Chaurette		Limbour, Gatineau	Manager	6,128	10.99	4th
Hull—Aylmer	Nicolas Thibodeau		Gatineau		7,467	13.58	3rd
Laurentides—Labelle	Claude Dufour		Ferme-Neuve	Teacher	4,122	6.30	4th
Mirabel	Anne-Marie Saint-Germain		Saint-Hyacinthe	Communications professional	5,219	8.03	4th
Pontiac	Denise Giroux		Cantley	Lawyer	6,503	10.51	4th
Rivière-du-Nord	Myriam Ouellette		Saint-Jérôme	Secretary	4,194	6.98	4th

== Saskatchewan ==
Riding	Candidate's Name	Notes	Residence	Occupation	Votes	%	Rank
Battlefords—Lloydminster	Marcella Pedersen		Cut Knife		4,098	11.44	2nd
Carlton Trail—Eagle Creek	Jasmine Calix		Martensville		5,535	12.31	2nd
Cypress Hills—Grasslands	Trevor Peterson		Assiniboia	Teacher	3,666	9.54	2nd
Desnethé—Missinippi—Churchill River	Georgina Jolibois	Member of Parliament for Desnethé—Missinippi—Churchill River (2015–2019); Mayor of La Loche (2003–2015)	La Loche		7,741	28.40	2nd
Moose Jaw—Lake Centre—Lanigan	Talon Regent		Moose Jaw	Lawyer	7,660	17.03	2nd
Prince Albert	Harmony Johnson-Harder				6,925	17.44	2nd
Regina—Lewvan	Jigar Patel		Normanview, Regina		14,767	28.61	2nd
Regina—Qu'Appelle	Ray Aldinger		Regina	Corrections worker	7,685	19.83	2nd
Regina—Wascana	Hailey Clark			Sales professional	5,801	12.79	3rd
Saskatoon—Grasswood	Erika Ritchie		Grosvenor Park, Saskatoon	Engineer	12,672	25.63	2nd
Saskatoon—University	Claire Card		North Park, Saskatoon	Veterinarian/Professor at the University of Saskatchewan	13,994	29.76	2nd
Saskatoon West	Sheri Benson	Deputy Leader of the New Democratic Party (2019); Member of Parliament for Saskatoon West (2015–2019)	Caswell Hill, Saskatoon		15,708	40.29	2nd
Souris—Moose Mountain	Ashlee Hicks		Saskatoon		3,214	7.74	3rd
Yorkton—Melville	Carter Antoine		Regina	Student	4,747	12.24	2nd

== The Territories ==
Riding	Candidate's Name	Notes	Residence	Occupation	Votes	%	Rank
Northwest Territories	Mary Beckett		Inuvik	Self-employed	3,640	22.34	3rd
Nunavut	Mumilaaq Qaqqaq		Iqaluit		3,861	40.84	1st
Yukon	Justin Lemphers		Whitehorse		4,617	21.97	3rd
