= Law of Canada =

The Supreme Court of Canada in Ottawa, west of Parliament Hill

The legal system of Canada is pluralist: its foundations lie in the English common law system (inherited from its period as a colony of the British Empire), the French civil law system (inherited from its French Empire past), and Indigenous law systems developed by the various Indigenous Nations.

The Constitution of Canada is the supreme law of the country, and consists of written text and unwritten conventions. The Constitution Act, 1867 (known as the British North America Act prior to 1982), affirmed governance based on parliamentary precedent and divided powers between the federal and provincial governments. The Statute of Westminster 1931 granted full autonomy, and the Constitution Act, 1982 ended all legislative ties to Britain, as well as adding a constitutional amending formula and the Canadian Charter of Rights and Freedoms. The Charter guarantees basic rights and freedoms that usually cannot be over-ridden by any government—though a notwithstanding clause allows Parliament and the provincial legislatures to override certain sections of the Charter for a period of five years.

Canada's judiciary plays an important role in interpreting laws and has the power to strike down Acts of Parliament that violate the constitution. The Supreme Court of Canada is the highest court and final arbiter and has been led since December 18, 2017 by Richard Wagner, the Chief Justice of Canada. Its nine members are appointed by the governor general on the advice of the prime minister and minister of justice. All judges at the superior and appellate levels are appointed after consultation with non-governmental legal bodies. The federal Cabinet also appoints justices to superior courts in the provincial and territorial jurisdictions. Common law prevails everywhere except in Quebec, where civil law predominates. Criminal law is solely a federal responsibility and is uniform throughout Canada. Law enforcement, including criminal courts, is officially a provincial responsibility, conducted by provincial and municipal police forces. However, in most rural areas and some urban areas, policing responsibilities are contracted to the federal Royal Canadian Mounted Police.

Canadian Aboriginal law provides certain constitutionally recognized rights to land and traditional practices for Indigenous groups in Canada. Various treaties and case laws were established to mediate relations between Europeans and many Indigenous peoples. These treaties are agreements between the Canadian Crown-in-Council with the duty to consult and accommodate. Indigenous law in Canada refers to the legal traditions, customs, and practices of Indigenous Nations and communities.

== Constitution of Canada ==
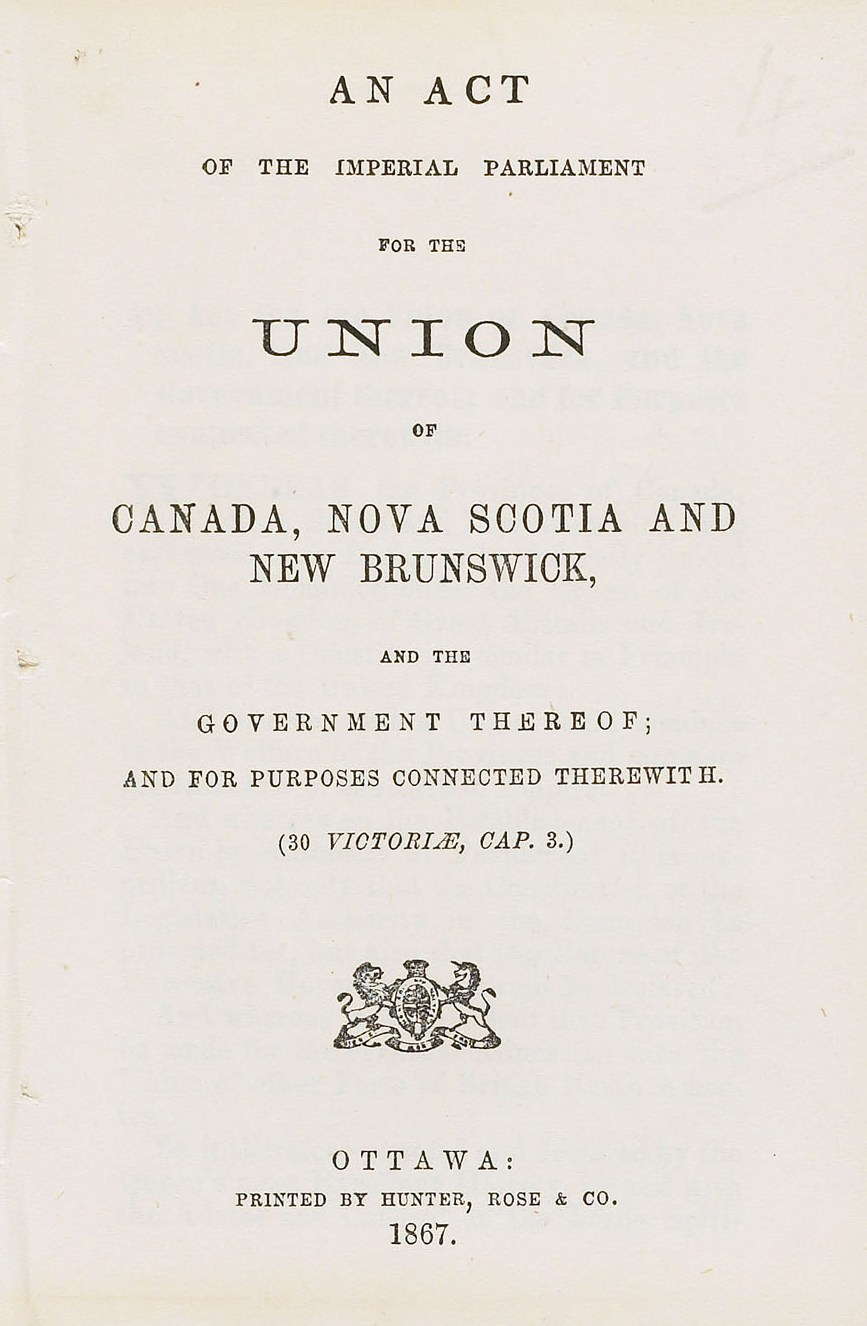
Cover of the Constitution Act, 1867

Pursuant to section 52 of the Constitution Act, 1982, Canada's constitution is its supreme law, and any law passed by any federal, provincial, or territorial government that is inconsistent with the constitution is invalid.

The Constitution Act, 1982 stipulates that Canada's constitution includes that act, a series of thirty Acts and orders referred to in a schedule to that Act (the most notable of which is the Constitution Act, 1867), and any amendment to any of those Acts. However, the Supreme Court of Canada has found that this list is not intended to be exhaustive, and in 1998's Reference re Secession of Quebec identified four "supporting principles and rules" that are included as unwritten elements of the constitution: federalism, democracy, constitutionalism and the rule of law, and respect for minorities. While these principles are an enforceable part of Canada's constitution, Canadian courts have not used them to override the written text of the constitution, instead confining their role to "filling gaps".

Because the Constitution Act, 1867 provides that Canada's constitution is "similar in Principle to that of the United Kingdom", which is considered to be an uncodified constitution, the Supreme Court has also recognized the existence of constitutional conventions. In 1981's Reference re a Resolution to amend the Constitution, the Court provided three factors necessary for the existence of a constitutional convention: a practice or agreement developed by political actors, a recognition that they are bound to follow that practice or agreement, and a purpose for that practice or agreement. It also found that, while these conventions are not law and are therefore unenforceable by the courts, courts may recognize conventions in their rulings.

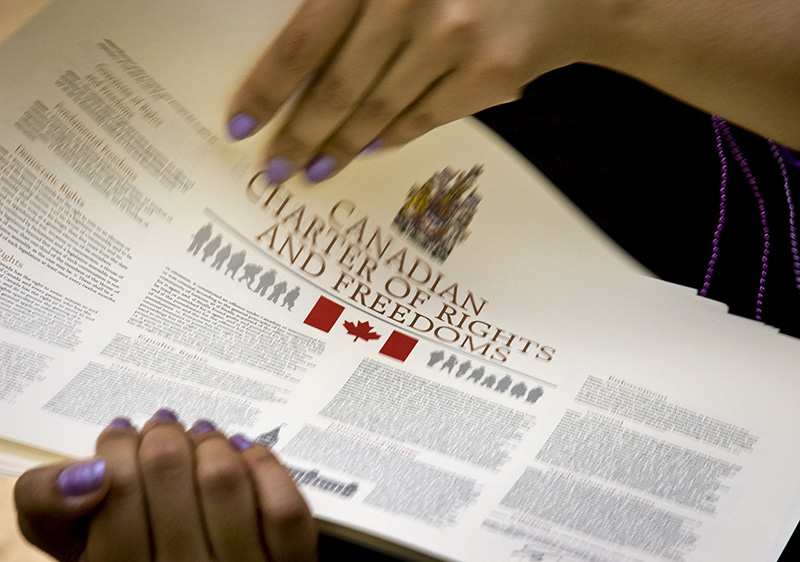
Copies of the Canadian Charter of Rights and Freedoms

The Constitution Act, 1867 assigns powers to the provincial and federal governments. Matters under federal jurisdiction include criminal law, trade and commerce, banking, and immigration. The federal government also has the residual power to make laws necessary for Canada's "peace, order and good government". One of the major areas of provincial jurisdiction is property and civil rights, which includes broad power to enact laws of a civil nature, such as property law, contract law and family law. Provincial jurisdiction includes other matters, such as natural resources, hospitals, municipalities, education (except education on First Nation reserves).

The Constitution Act, 1867 also provides that, while provinces establish their own superior courts, the federal government appoints their judges. It also gives the federal Parliament the right to establish a court system responsible for federal law and a general court of appeal to hear appeals of decisions of both federal and provincial courts. This last power resulted in the federal Parliament's creation of the Supreme Court of Canada.

The Constitution Act, 1982 created a mechanism by which Canada's constitution could be amended by joint action of federal and provincial legislatures; prior to 1982, most of it could be amended only by the Parliament of the United Kingdom. It also contains the Charter of Rights and Freedoms, which grants individual rights that may not be contravened by any provincial or federal law.

== Legislation ==
Acts passed by the Parliament of Canada and by provincial legislatures are the primary sources of law in Canada. Sections 91 and 94A of the Constitution Act, 1867 set out the subject matters for exclusive federal jurisdiction. Sections 92, 92A, and 94 set out the areas of exclusive provincial legislation. Section 95 sets out areas of concurrent federal and provincial jurisdiction.

Laws passed by the federal Parliament are initially published in the Canada Gazette, a federal government newspaper published regularly and which includes new statutes and regulations. Federal statutes are subsequently published in the annual Statutes of Canada. From time to time, the federal government will prepare a consolidation of federal statutes, known as the Revised Statutes of Canada. The most recent federal consolidation was in 1985.

Laws passed by the provinces follow a similar practice. The Acts are pronounced in a provincial gazette, published annually and consolidated from time to time.

The Revised Statutes of Canada is the federal statutory consolidation of statutes enacted by the Parliament of Canada. In each Canadian province, there is a similar consolidation of the statute law of the province. The Revised Statutes of British Columbia, Revised Statutes of Alberta, Statutes of Manitoba, Revised Statutes of Saskatchewan, 1978, Revised Statutes of New Brunswick, Revised Statutes of Nova Scotia, Statutes of Prince Edward Island, Consolidated Statutes of Newfoundland and Labrador, Revised Statutes of Ontario, and Revised Statutes of Quebec are the statutory consolidations of each Canadian province. They contain all of the major topic areas and most of the statutes enacted by the governments in each province. These statutes in these provinces do not include criminal law, as the criminal law in Canada is an exclusive jurisdiction of the federal Parliament, which has enacted the Criminal Code, which is included in the Revised Statutes of Canada.

== Legal traditions ==
=== Common law ===
Nine of the provinces, other than Quebec, and the federal territories, follow the common law legal tradition. While the federal territories use common law, Indigenous nations and their associated territories do not (see below). Equally, courts have power under the provincial Judicature Acts to apply equity.

As with all common law countries, Canadian law adheres to the doctrine of stare decisis. Lower courts must follow the decisions of higher courts by which they are bound. For instance, all Ontario lower courts are bound by the decisions of the Ontario Court of Appeal and all British Columbia lower courts are bound by the decisions of the British Columbia Court of Appeal. However, no Ontario court is bound by decisions of any British Columbia court and vice versa. Nonetheless, decisions made by a province's highest court (provincial Courts of Appeal) are often considered as "persuasive" even though they are not binding on other provinces.

Only the Supreme Court of Canada has authority to bind all lower courts in the country with a single ruling, but the Supreme Court cannot bind itself. The busier courts, such as the Court of Appeal for Ontario, for example, are often looked to for guidance on many local matters of law outside the province, especially in matters such as evidence and criminal law.

When there is little or no existing Canadian decision on a particular legal issue and it becomes necessary to look to a non-Canadian legal authority for reference, decisions of English courts and American courts are often utilized. In light of the long-standing history between English law and Canadian law, the English Court of Appeal and the House of Lords are often cited as and considered persuasive authority, and are often followed.

Decisions from Commonwealth nations, aside from England, are also often treated as persuasive sources of law in Canada.

Due to Canada's historical connection with the United Kingdom, decisions of the House of Lords before 1867 are technically still binding on Canada unless they have been overturned by the Supreme Court of Canada, and Canada is still bound by the decisions of the Privy Council before the abolishment of appeals to that entity in 1949. In practice, however, no court in Canada has declared itself bound by any English court decision for decades, and it is highly unlikely that any Canadian court would do so in the future.

Criminal offences are found only within the Criminal Code and other federal statutes; an exception is that contempt of court is the only remaining common law offence in Canada.

=== Civil law ===
For historical reasons, Quebec has a hybrid legal system. Private law follows the civil law tradition, originally expressed in the Coutume de Paris as it applied in what was then New France. Today, the jus commune of Quebec is codified in the Civil Code of Quebec. As for public law, it was made that of the conquering British nation after the fall of New France in 1760, that is, the common law. The distinction between civil law and common law is not based on the division of powers set out in the Constitution Act, 1867. Therefore, legislation enacted by the provincial legislature in matters of public law, such as the Code of Penal Procedure, should be interpreted following the common law tradition. Likewise, legislation enacted by the federal Parliament in matters of private law, such as the Divorce Act, is to be interpreted following the civil law tradition and in harmony with the Civil Code of Quebec.

=== Indigenous legal traditions ===
Canada was founded on the original territories of over 900 different Indigenous groups, each using different Indigenous legal traditions. Cree, Blackfoot, Mi'kmaq and numerous other First Nations; Inuit; and Métis will apply their own legal traditions in daily life, creating contracts, working with governmental and corporate entities, ecological management and criminal proceedings and family law. Most maintain their laws through traditional governance alongside the elected officials and federal laws. The legal precedents set millennia ago are known through stories and derived from the actions and past responses as well as through continuous interpretation by elders and law-keepers—the same process by which nearly all legal traditions, from common laws and civil codes, are formed.

While the many legal traditions appear similar in that none were codified, each has quite different sets of laws. Many laws stem from stories which in turn may stem from writings or markings, such as geographic features, petroglyphs, pictographs, wiigwaasabakoon and more. Inuit Nunangat's governance differs quite markedly from its many-nationed neighbour Denendeh, as Denendeh's diverse Dene Laws differ quite markedly from laws governing Lingít Aaní, Gitx̱san Lax̱yip or Wet'suwet'en Yin'tah; and, as those differ from Haudenosaunee's, Eeyou-Istchee's or Mi'kma'ki's. One thing most Indigenous legal and governance traditions have in common is their use of clans such as Anishinaabek's doodeman (though most are matrilineal like Gitx̱san's Wilps).

== Areas of law ==
=== Aboriginal law ===
Aboriginal law is the area of law related to the Canadian Government's relationship with its Indigenous peoples (First Nations, Métis and Inuit). Section 91(24) of the Constitution Act, 1867 gives the federal parliament exclusive power to legislate in matters related to Aboriginals, which includes groups governed by the Indian Act, different Numbered Treaties and outside of those Acts.

=== Administrative law ===
Canadian administrative law is the body of law that addresses the actions and operations of governments and governmental agencies.

=== Contract law ===
Individual provinces have codified some principles of contract law in a Sale of Goods Act, which was modeled on early English versions. Outside of Quebec, most contract law is still common law, based on the rulings of judges in contract litigation over the years. Quebec, being a civil law jurisdiction, does not have contract law, but rather has its own law of obligations.

=== Constitutional law ===
Constitutional law is the area of Canadian law relating to the interpretation and application of the Constitution of Canada by the Courts. This is represented in the Constitution Act, 1867, Constitution Act, 1982 and Canadian Charter of Rights and Freedoms.

=== Copyright law ===
Copyright law of Canada governs the legally enforceable rights to creative and artistic works under the laws of Canada.

=== Criminal law ===
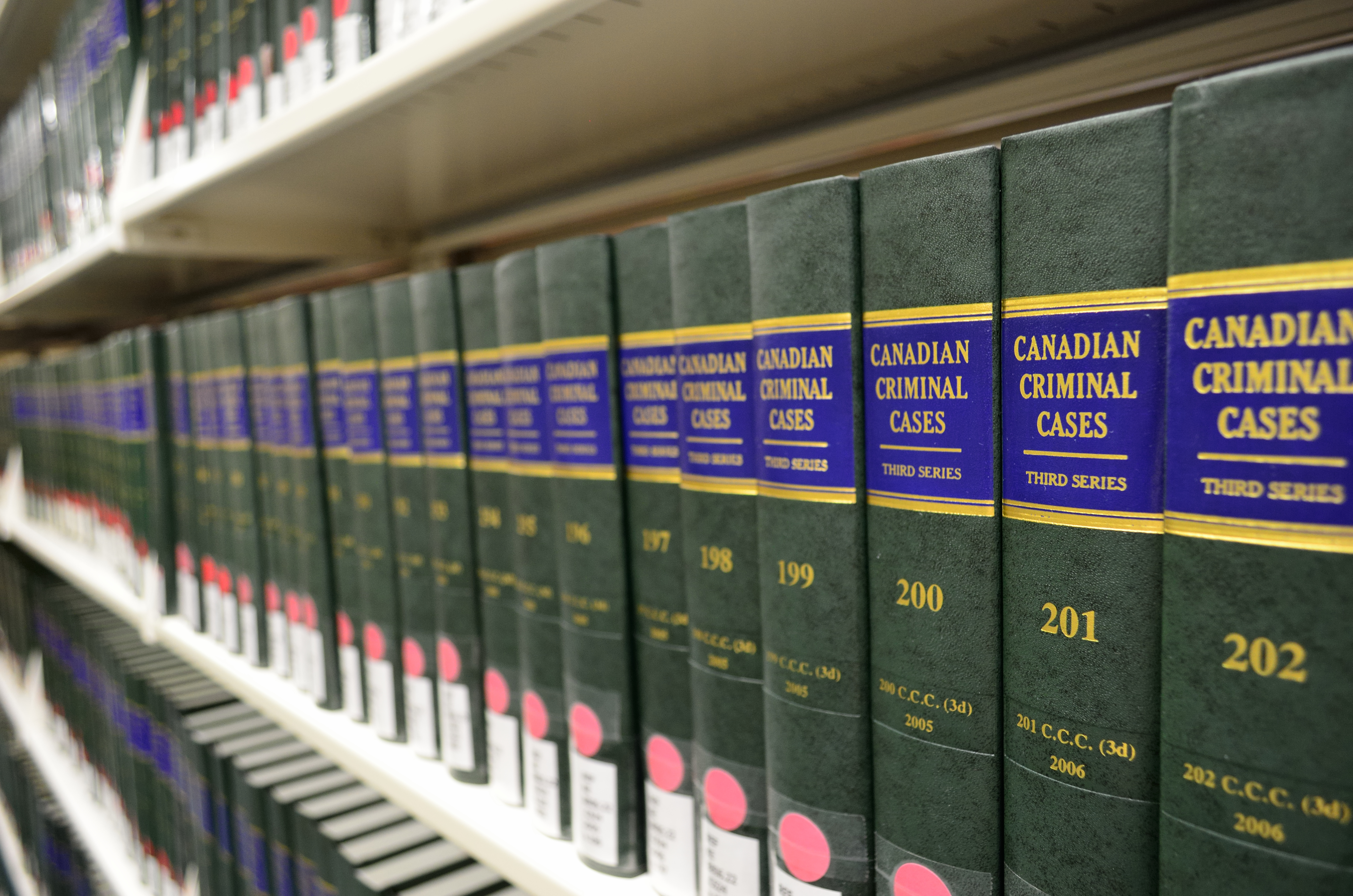
Canadian Criminal Cases collection

Criminal law in Canada falls under the exclusive legislative jurisdiction of the federal government. The power to enact criminal law is derived from section 91(27) of the Constitution Act, 1867. Most criminal laws have been codified in the Criminal Code, as well as the Controlled Drugs and Substances Act, Youth Criminal Justice Act, and several other peripheral Acts.

The provinces are responsible for the administration of justice, including criminal trials within their respective provinces, despite their inability to enact criminal laws. Provinces do have the power to promulgate quasi-criminal or regulatory offences in a variety of administrative and other areas, and every province has done so with myriad rules and regulations across a broad spectrum.

=== Evidence law ===
The Canada Evidence Act is an Act of the Parliament of Canada, first passed in 1893, that regulates the rules of evidence in court proceedings under federal law. Each province also has its own evidence statute, governing the law of evidence in civil proceedings in the province.

=== Family law ===
Family law in Canada concerns the body of Canadian law dealing with family relationship, marriage, and divorce. The federal government has exclusive jurisdiction over the substance of marriage and divorce. Provinces have exclusive jurisdiction over the procedures surrounding marriage. Provinces also have laws dealing with marital property and with family maintenance (including spousal support).

=== Human rights law ===
Human rights are constitutionally protected by the Canadian Charter of Rights and Freedoms, which applies to the federal and provincial governments and protects the rights of individuals in relation to government action. The Charter protects fundamental freedoms such as freedom of religion, freedom of association, and freedom of expression, as well as prohibiting discrimination on personal characteristics.

Human rights are also protected by federal and provincial statutes, which apply to governments as well as to the private sector. Human rights laws generally prohibit discrimination on personal characteristics in housing, employment, and services to the public. The Canadian Human Rights Act applies to the federal government and to industries under federal jurisdiction, such as aviation and banking. Provincial human rights laws apply to the provincial governments and to industries and businesses under provincial jurisdiction.

=== Immigration and refugee law ===
Canadian immigration and refugee law concerns the area of law related to the admission of foreign nationals into Canada, their rights and responsibilities once admitted, and the conditions of their removal. The primary law on these matters is in the Immigration and Refugee Protection Act.

=== Inheritance law ===
Inheritance law in Canada is constitutionally a provincial matter. Therefore, the laws governing inheritance in Canada are legislated by each individual province.

=== Insolvency law ===
The Parliament of Canada has exclusive jurisdiction to regulate matters relating to bankruptcy and insolvency, by virtue of s.91 of the Constitution Act, 1867. It has passed some statutes as a result, i.e., The Bankruptcy and Insolvency Act ("BIA") and the Winding-Up and Restructuring Act (which essentially applies only to financial institutions under federal jurisdiction). In applying these statutes, provincial law has important consequences. Section 67(1)(b) of the BIA provides that "any property that as against the bankrupt is exempt from execution or seizure under any laws applicable in the province within which the property is situated and within which the bankrupt resides" is not divisible among their creditors. Provincial legislation under the property and civil rights power of the Constitution Act, 1867 regulates the resolution of financial difficulties that occur before the onset of insolvency.

=== Labour and employment law ===
Canadian labour law is that body of law which regulates the rights, restrictions obligations of trade unions, workers and employers in Canada. Canadian employment law is that body of law which regulates the rights, restrictions obligations of non-unionised workers and employers in Canada. Most labour regulation in Canada is conducted at the provincial level by government agencies and boards. However, certain industries under federal regulation are subject solely to federal labour legislation and standards.

=== Patent law ===
Canadian patent law is the legal system regulating the granting of patents for inventions within Canada, and the enforcement of these rights in Canada.

=== Procedural law ===
The functioning of the Courts is regulated by the laws of civil procedure which are codified in each province's civil procedures rules.

=== Property law ===
Property law in Canada is the body of law concerning the rights of individuals over land, objects, and expression within Canada. It encompasses personal property, real property, and intellectual property.

=== Tort law ===
Tort law in Canada concerns the treatment of the law of torts within the Canadian jurisdiction excluding Quebec, which is covered by the law of obligations.

=== Trademark law ===
Canada's trademark law provides protection for distinctive marks, certification marks, distinguishing guises, and proposed marks against those who appropriate the goodwill of the mark or create confusion between different vendors' goods or services.

== Judicial system ==
Canadian court system (Source: Canadian Department of Justice)

Under the Constitution Act, 1867, the federal Parliament and the provincial legislatures both have the constitutional authority to create courts: Parliament under s. 101, and the Provinces under s. 92(14). However, the federal power to create courts is much more limited than the provincial power. The provincial courts have a much more extensive jurisdiction, including the constitutionally entrenched power to determine constitutional issues.

Through Section 35 of the Constitution Act, 1982, Indigenous nations retain significant rights and title. It, however, remains unclear the degree to which Indigenous nations have authority over judicial matters. Especially since 1995, the Government of Canada has maintained a policy of recognizing the inherent right of self-governance under section 35. The evolution through cases such as Delgamuukw-Gisday'wa and the Tsilhqot'in Nation v British Columbia has affirmed the Euro-Canadian courts' needs to meaningfully engage with Indigenous legal systems, including through Indigenous structures of dispute resolution.

The Supreme Court of Canada (French: Cour suprême du Canada) is the highest court of Canada and is the final court of appeal in the Canadian justice system. Parliament created it by Act of Parliament in 1875, as a "general court of appeal for Canada". Prior to 1949, cases could be appealed to the Judicial Committee of the Privy Council in the United Kingdom, and some cases bypassed the Supreme Court of Canada entirely.

Other than the Supreme Court, the Canadian court system is divided into two classes of courts: superior courts of general jurisdiction, and courts of limited jurisdiction, sometimes referred to as inferior courts. The superior courts, created and maintained by the provinces, are divided into superior courts of original jurisdiction and superior courts of appeal. These courts are sometimes also referred to as "Section 96" courts, in reference to s. 96 of the Constitution Act, 1867, which grants the federal government the power to appoint the judges of these courts. As courts of general jurisdiction, the provincial superior courts of original jurisdiction have jurisdiction over all matters, under both federal and provincial law, unless the matter has been assigned to some other court or administrative agency by a statute passed by the appropriate legislative body. The superior courts of original jurisdiction have an extensive civil jurisdiction, under both federal and provincial laws. Under the Criminal Code, a federal statute, they have jurisdiction over the most serious criminal offences, such as murder. They also hear appeals from the Provincial Courts in criminal matters and some civil matters. A further appeal normally lies to superior court of appeal, the highest court in each province.

The provinces also can establish courts of limited jurisdiction, whose jurisdiction is limited solely to what is included in the statutory grant of jurisdiction. These courts are often called "Provincial Courts", even though the superior courts established by the provinces are also provincial courts. The Provincial Courts have an extensive criminal jurisdiction under the Criminal Code, a federal statute, and also typically have a limited civil jurisdiction in matters under provincial jurisdiction, such as small claims and some family matters. The judges of the Provincial Courts are appointed by the provincial governments.

There are also additional federal courts established by Parliament, which have a specialised jurisdiction in certain areas of federal law. These courts are the Federal Court of Appeal, the Federal Court, the Tax Court of Canada, and the Court Martial Appeal Court of Canada.

== See also ==
- At His Majesty's pleasure
- Canadian Legal Information Institute (CanLII)
- Housekeeping provision
- Human rights in Canada
- List of national legal systems
- List of acts of the Parliament of Canada
- Monarchy of Canada and the Indigenous peoples of Canada
- Statutes of Canada
