= List of members of the Canadian House of Commons with military service (N) =

Military service House members

Name	Elected party	Constituency	Elected date	Military service
"Paddy" Neale	New Democrat	Vancouver East	October 30, 1972	Royal Canadian Air Force
Doug Neil	Progressive Conservative	Moose Jaw	October 30, 1972	Royal Canadian Air Force (1942-1946)
Nels Edwin Nelson	New Democrat	Burnaby—Seymour	October 30, 1972	Canadian Army
Wallace Bickford "Wally" Nesbitt	Progressive Conservative	Oxford	August 10, 1953	Royal Canadian Navy (1941-1945)
Jack R. Nicholson	Liberal	Vancouver Centre	June 18, 1962	Canadian Army (1940-1942)
Carl Olof Nickle	Progressive Conservative	Calgary West	December 10, 1951	Canadian Army (1939-1948)
Erik Nielsen	Progressive Conservative	Yukon	December 16, 1957	Royal Canadian Air Force (1939-1945)
George Clyde Nowlan	Progressive Conservative	Digby—Annapolis—Kings	December 13, 1948	Canadian Army
Terence James Nugent	Progressive Conservative	Edmonton—Strathcona	March 31, 1958	Canadian Army (1942-1946)
