= North Vancouver—Burnaby =

Former federal electoral district in British Columbia, Canada

British Columbia electoral district
- Location in the Lower Mainland

Defunct federal electoral district
- Legislature: House of Commons
- District created: 1976
- District abolished: 1987
- First contested: 1979
- Last contested: 1984

North Vancouver—Burnaby was a federal electoral district in British Columbia, Canada, that was represented in the House of Commons of Canada from 1979 to 1988. This riding was created in 1976 from parts of Burnaby—Seymour and Capilano ridings.

It was abolished in 1987 when it was redistributed into Burnaby—Kingsway and North Vancouver ridings.

== Members of Parliament ==
Parliament	Years	Member	Party
Riding created from Burnaby—Seymour and Capilano
31st	1979–1980	Chuck Cook	Progressive Conservative
32nd	1980–1984	Chuck Cook	Progressive Conservative
33rd	1984–1988	Chuck Cook	Progressive Conservative
Riding dissolved into Burnaby—Kingsway and North Vancouver

== Election results ==
1984 Canadian federal election
Party	Candidate	Votes	%	±%
Progressive Conservative	Chuck Cook	21,750	43.63	+5.53
Liberal	Iona Campagnolo	14,321	28.73	–6.04
New Democratic	David Schreck	12,812	25.70	–1.15
Rhinoceros	Phil "Swamp Man" Marsh	383	0.77	–
Green	Betty Nickerson	217	0.44	–
Libertarian	John Clarke	174	0.35	–
Communist	Reg Walters	89	0.18	–
Confederation of Regions	Heinz Beyer	60	0.12	–
Independent	Albert A. Ritchie	48	0.10	–
Total valid votes		49,854	99.72	
Total rejected ballots		142	0.28	+0.11
Turnout		49,996	82.27	+4.67
Eligible voters		60,767		
Progressive Conservative hold		Swing		+5.79
Source: Elections Canada

1980 Canadian federal election
Party	Candidate	Votes	%	±%
Progressive Conservative	Chuck Cook	16,774	38.10	–0.08
Liberal	Gordon Gibson Jr	15,307	34.77	+1.59
New Democratic	Jack Woodward	11,820	26.85	–1.04
Social Credit	Poldi Meindl	88	0.20	–0.23
Marxist–Leninist	Kitti Hundal	38	0.09	+0.04
Total valid votes		44,027	99.82	
Total rejected ballots		78	0.18	–0.00
Turnout		44,105	77.60	–2.38
Eligible voters		56,836		
Progressive Conservative hold		Swing		–0.84
Source: Elections Canada

1979 Canadian federal election
Party	Candidate	Votes	%	±%
Progressive Conservative	Chuck Cook	16,545	38.18	–
Liberal	Gordon Gibson Jr	14,377	33.18	–
New Democratic	Russ Hicks	12,084	27.89	–
Social Credit	Poldi Meindl	188	0.43	–
Communist	Eric H. Waugh	92	0.21	–
Independent	A. Neila Taylor	29	0.07	–
Marxist–Leninist	Kitti Hundal	20	0.05	–
Total valid votes		43,335	99.82	
Total rejected ballots		77	0.18	–
Turnout		43,412	79.99	–
Eligible voters		54,275		
This riding was created from parts of Burnaby—Seymour and Capilano, which elected a Liberal and a Progressive Conservative, respectively, in the previous election.
Source: Elections Canada

== See also ==
- List of Canadian electoral districts
- Historical federal electoral districts of Canada
