= Canadian Indigenous law =

Legal customs, and practices of Indigenous peoples in Canada

Indigenous law in Canada refers to the legal traditions, customs, and practices of Indigenous peoples and groups. Canadian aboriginal law is different from Indigenous Law. Canadian Aboriginal law provides certain constitutionally recognized rights to land and traditional practices.

Canada contains over 900 different Indigenous groups, each using different Indigenous legal traditions. Cree, Blackfoot, Mi'kmaq and numerous other First Nations; Inuit; and Métis will apply their own legal traditions in daily life, creating contracts, working with governmental and corporate entities, ecological management and criminal proceedings and family law. Most maintain their laws through traditional governance alongside the elected officials and federal laws. The legal precedents set millennia ago are known through stories and derived from the actions and past responses as well as through continuous interpretation by elders and law-keepers—the same process by which nearly all legal traditions, from common laws and civil codes, are formed.

While the many legal traditions appear similar in that none were codified, each has quite different sets of laws. Many laws stem from stories which in turn may stem from writings or markings, such as geographic features, petroglyphs, pictographs, wiigwaasabakoon and more. Inuit Nunangat's governance differs quite markedly from its many-nationed neighbour Denendeh, as Denendeh's diverse Dene Laws differ quite markedly from laws governing Lingít Aaní, Gitx̱san Lax̱yip or Wet'suwet'en Yin'tah; and, as those differ from Haudenosaunee's, Eeyou-Istchee's or Mi'kma'ki's. One thing most Indigenous legal and governance traditions have in common is their use of clans such as Anishinaabek's doodeman (though most are matrilineal like Gitx̱san's Wilps).

== Terminology ==
=== Versus Aboriginal law ===
Indigenous law refers to Indigenous peoples' own legal systems. This includes the laws and legal processes developed by Indigenous groups to govern their relationships, manage their natural resources, and manage conflicts. Indigenous law is developed from a variety of sources and institutions which differ across legal traditions. Canadian aboriginal law is the area of law related to the Canadian Government's relationship with its Indigenous peoples (First Nations, Métis and Inuit). Section 91(24) of the Constitution Act, 1867 gives the federal parliament exclusive power to legislate in matters related to Aboriginals, which includes groups governed by the Indian Act, different Numbered Treaties and outside of those Acts. Aboriginal peoples as a collective noun is a specific term of art used in legal documents, including the Constitution Act, 1982.

=== Self-government ===
Indigenous or Aboriginal self-government refers to proposals to give governments representing the Indigenous peoples in Canada greater powers of government. These proposals range from giving Aboriginal governments powers similar to that of local governments in Canada to demands that Indigenous governments be recognized as sovereign, and capable of "nation-to-nation" negotiations as legal equals to the Crown (i.e. the Canadian state), as well as many other variations.

== Traditions ==
=== Anishinaabe ===
Anishinaabe laws stem from a large corpus of stories that create a narrative structure from which laws or ways of being (as a community and as an individual) were interpreted. These histories include tales of Nanabozho and a wide spectrum of other beings and peoples, and the moral implications and practical applications gleaned from them. Anishinaabe Law historically has interacted with the legal systems of other nations in examples like with the Gdoo-naaganinaa (Dish With One Spoon) Treaty made with the Haudenosaunee. The Atikameksheng Anishinawbek translate "law" as Naaknigewin.

=== Atikamekw ===
Arising from their homeland, Nitaskinan, the Atikamekw Nation maintains a strong connection to their language and to their traditional legal system, called either irakonikewin or orakonikewin. Many differences arise between the English common law, the French civil code, and the Atikamekw irakonikewin, notably that of adoption, or opikihawasowin. As of 2016, the governments of Québec and the Atikamekw Nation are resolving differences in legal standings with regard to adoption procedures, which exists as a part of a larger scale effort at harmonizing the laws of and reconciling the Canadian State with Indigenous Nations.

=== Blackfoot ===
The Blackfoot term Akak′stiman can be translated as "law-making".

=== Dene ===
Dene law describes the numerous legal traditions across the Dene homelands, collectively called Denendeh, whose territories include nations like the Gwich'in, Hän, Kaska, Tutchone, Sahtu, Dane-zaa, Dene Thá, Tłı̨chǫ, and Dënësųłı̨né, amongst others. Across Dene nations, it is understood that Dene laws were enacted by the cultural hero or heroes: Yamoria and Yamozha, often called the Great Lawmaker(s).

Dene legal principles generally rest on the three foundations of equality, sharing, and reciprocity, as well as an interdependence on human and nonhuman life forces. Legally and conceptually, Dene do not distinguish between human and nonhuman beings such as ravens, caribous, trees, lakes, and mountains. Interpreted stories often see Dene and nonhuman animals working together to find mutually beneficial solutions. Indeed, there exists an almost treaty-like relationship between humans and many other beings, creating obligations on nonhuman animals and other beings to share their gifts with humans as humans are obligated to show respect through conservation and gratitude. For example, Dene law stipulates that humans travelling across country must pay for their passage in the form of gifting things to waterways, landforms, and other beings such as ancestors. Further, conceptions of care differ between Dene and English legal and social systems, particularly with children maturing in different social and environmental situations such as through apprenticeships and dutiful listening to storytellers.

The differences between English law and Dene law have created significant friction between the Dene Nations and the Canadian State. One example is the rupturing of intergenerational transmission of law due to residential schools separated children from their social (and legal) frameworks. Another is the difference in conservation understandings: Under common law, the Northwest Territories Ministry of Environment and Natural Resources sometimes promotes single-sex hunting activities, with posters detailing how to distinguish male from female caribou, directing hunters to target the males. English law, concerning the reproductive abilities of the herds, considers sex-selected hunting to be more sustainable whereas Dene law sees the potential in a rupture of knowledge transferral similar to killing off all the elder men of a community. In contrast with the paternalistic English legal system wherein humans must oversee and conserve other species, the Dene worldview stresses the agency of nonhuman beings. This results in situations where beings hunted or fished which, under English territorial law, must be left alone or thrown back clashes with the Dene legal institution of beings giving themselves to the hunters.

As there exist many languages and cultures across Denendeh, so too are Dene legal systems called differently from one territory to the next. For example, Tłı̨chǫ refer to Dene law as Dǫ Nàowoòdeè, Dena ÁʼNezen refers to Kaska law, Dene Zhatıé law and stories are called Mek’ı̨́ı̨́ Dene Ts’elı̨ and Megǫndıé.

=== Eeyou/Eenou ===
The modern legal system of Eeyou Istchee has developed out of contact with the Canadian State, the province of Québec, and from the historical, traditional Eeyou ᐄᔨᔨᐤ or Eenou Eedouwin ᐄᓅ ᐃᐦᑐᐎᓐ (the Eeyou/Eenou way of doing things).

=== Gitanyow ===
The legal system of the Gitanyow is called Gitanyow Ayookxw.

=== Gitx̱san ===
The Gitx̱san set of laws is known as Ayokim Gitx̱san, Ayookim Gitx̱san, Ayookw, or Ayook.

Forming the most fundamental core of Gitx̱san society are the matrilineal "Houses" or wilphl Gitx̱san, also called "Huwilp" (sing.: Wilp), which are each associated with one of the four P'deeḵ, or clans: Lax̱gibuu (Wolf), Lax Seel or Lax Ganeda (Raven/Frog), Giskaast (Fireweed), and Lax Skiik (Eagle). Gitx̱san authority and jurisdiction, or Dax̱gyat, manifests through the wilphl Gitx̱san and their relationships with the Lax̱yip, their territories. Gix̱san Lax̱yip, or Gitx̱san Country, maintains clear and distinct territorial jurisdictions associated with specific Huwilp, which are known and affirmed through what can be translated as treasures or inheritances, the gwalax̱ yee’nst. The gwalax̱ yee'nst essentially define a Wilp, as these include not only the tangible, like one's wilnaatahl (or close relatives) and lax yiphl wilp (the lands and resources related to the Wilp), but also the intangible, such as potlatch seat names and the adaawx (oral histories), including "associated animal crests, symbols, limx oo’y (time immemorial songs), limx sinaahl (breath songs) and limx nox nok (spirit songs)".

The whole of Gitx̱san society is woven together through the Ayookim Gitx̱san which dictate "the conduct of the Gitx̱san Huwilp around inheritance, marriage, adoption, access to property, trespass, injury, redress of injury", as well as citizenship, use of resources and conduct at potlatches. The backbone of the Ayookw are the adaawx (also spelled "adaawk") which sustain evidence for land ownership and social organization. And, much like other coastal Cascadian First Nations, the central core political institution is the potlatch, or liligit. The Wilp Li’iliget is the Feast House, also called the "Gitx̱san Parliament Building". The li’iliget take on different formats pending the type of Gitx̱san business or obligation to be fulfilled.

Contemporarily, the Gitx̱san Nation has dealt with a fracturing political structure where the Indian Act band councils (with jurisdiction solely over the reserve lands) exists in contention with traditional governance structures. As such, and following the momentous 1997 Delgamuukw-Gisday’wa case, the wilphl Gitx̱san have coalesced into the Gitx̱san Huwilp Government. Although the adaawk were not accepted as testimonial evidence during the Delgamuukw-Gisday'wa case, the precedence was set such that the "admissibility [of oral histories] must be determined on a case-by-case basis". Rather than rendering inadmissible adaawx and other oral histories, there are now more defined structures by which such lines of evidence are accepted in Euro-Canadian courthouses. The current restructuring of the Canadian legal environment is resulting in a relative re-empowerment of Gitx̱san Ayookim and governance, alongside other Indigenous legal structures.

=== Haisla ===
Haisla Nuuyum, or the Haisla way of life and laws, denotes and dictates ways of interacting within Haisla Country and alongside neighbouring territories and settled nations. The Nuyuum underpins historical and contemporary forms of leadership, like the Chief and Council governing system, and guides governing responsibilities across the nation.

=== Haudenosaunee ===
Haudenosaunee flag displaying the Hiawatha Belt and representing the Great Law of Peace.

As the oldest, continuously functioning representative democracy in the world, the Iroquoian Six Nations of the Longhouse, or the Haudenosaunee, confederated in an estimated 1142 C.E. through the enacting of the Great Law of Peace (or Kaianere’kó:wa in Kanienʼkéha). The uniting of the original five nations (the Onödowáʼga:/Seneca, the Gayogo̱hó:nǫʼ/Cayuga, the Onyota'a:ka/Oneida, the Onöñda’gaga’/Onondaga, and the Kanienʼkehá:ka/Mohawk), and thus the core legal framework, is recounted orally from the constitutional wampum, and is symbolized by the Tree of Peace, the eastern white pine.

The laws are transmitted by means of symbolic wampum and are divided into 117 articles in total. The transmission is done yearly by orally recounting the confederation narrative. This narrative conveys the travels and history of the Great Peacemaker, Jigonhsasee, and Hiawatha as they brought peace to Haudenosaunee Country. Through them, governmental structures and legal institutions were created to metaphorically, socially, economically, and concretely unite families. As such, nations are conceived as elder and younger brothers, and when asked how this new structure would work, the Peacemaker replied: "It will take the form of the longhouse in which there are many hearths, one for each family, yet all live as one household under one chief mother. They shall have one mind and live under one law. Thinking will replace killing, and there shall be one commonwealth."

=== Heiltsuk ===
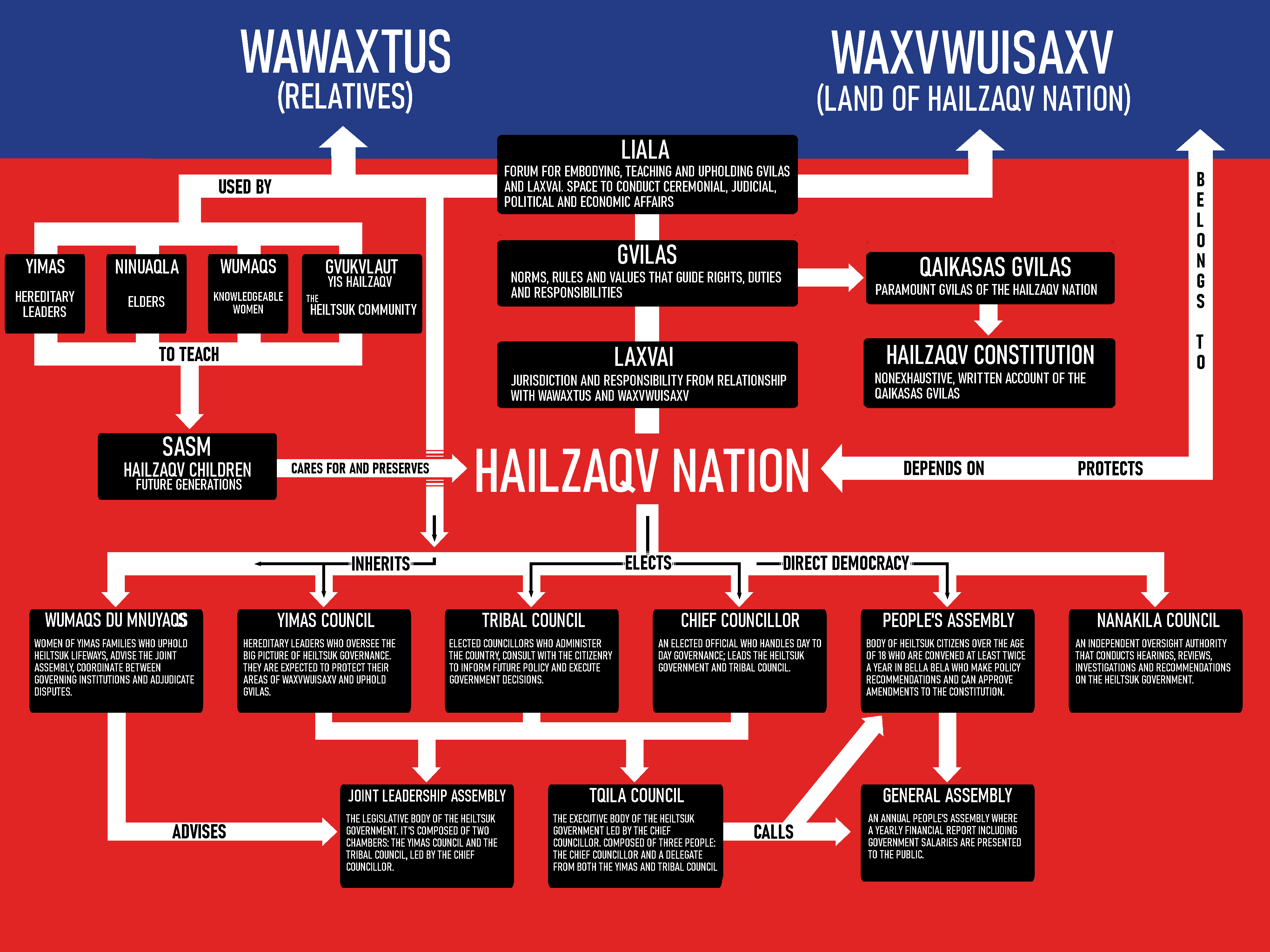
Infographic outlining some aspects of the Heiltsuk constitution.

Ǧvi̓ḷás are the customary laws governing the Heiltsuk nation and their land, Waxvwuisaxv. Gvilas embodies the values, beliefs, teachings, actions, experiences and principles of the Heiltsuk people. Gvilas is used by Heiltsuk to balance the health of their land with their own needs. It works toward unity between the various persons who each have unique relationships, responsibilities and obligations. Potlatches are central to Heiltsuk law. Potlatches are a forum to affirm various legal matters such as marriages, economic transactions, clan membership, adoptions, funerals, social rank, names/offices, and land use rights. It is a ceremony that involves speeches, feasting, singing, dances, rituals and gifting. It is held in a large sacred building called a big house. At potlatches, the Yimas discuss the laws of their nation and then revise or reaffirm them if needed.

=== Inuit ===
Traditional forms of Inuit justice understand the interconnected nature of things. Leaders and Elders do not see themselves as agents of social control or law and order, as each individual contributes to the functioning of the community. The word for Inuit Law in Inuktitut is ᐃᓄᐃᑦ ᖃᐅᔨᒪᔭᑐᖃᖏᑦ Inuit Qaujimajatuqangit from the root "qaujima- ᖃᐅᔨᒪ-" meaning "to know", and could be literally translated as "that which has long been known by Inuit", It is also rendered as Qauyimayatuqangit (ᖃᐅᔨᒪᔭᑐᖃᖏᑦ) or ᖃᐅᔨᒪᓂᑐᖃᖏᑦ Qaujimanituqangit.

There are three legal subsets, where the angakkuq (or medicine man) of the community facilitates:

- tirigusuusiit, things to avoid
- maligait, things to follow
- piqujait, things to do

If these three are not obeyed, then the angakkuq may need to intervene with the offending party in order to avoid harmful consequence to the person or group. Breaking these laws or taboos was seen as the cause of misfortune, such as bad weather, accidents, or unsuccessful hunts. In order to pinpoint the cause of such misfortune, the angakkuq would undertake a spirit-guided journey outside of their body. They would discover the cause of the misfortune on this journey. Once they returned from the journey, the angakkuq would question people involved in the situation, and, under the belief that they already knew who was responsible, the people being questioned would often confess. This confession alone could be declared the solution to the problem, or acts of penance such as cleaning the urine pots or swapping wives might be necessary. A shaman might make a prophecy that a particular infant would become a prophet in adulthood.

The integration of Inuit Qaujimajatuqangit (or IQ) and Canadian Law is an ongoing process. For example, the Nunavut Court of Justice is the only unified single-level court in Canada, and it travels to communities every six weeks to two years. There are also on-the-land and contemporary healing circle programs administered.

=== Ktunaxa ===
The fundamental, underlying concept of Ktunaxa law (or Ɂaknumu¢tiŧiŧ) is that the Ktunaxa people arose from the land of their traditional country, Ktunaxa ɁamakɁis, where they remain keepers of the land, obligated to care for and respect the land and all things on it, living and nonliving. Ɂaknumu¢tiŧiŧ, as the law of the land, thus dictates Ktunaxa must protect and not overuse the land, ultimately maintaining balance in the understanding that all things are connected, as the land gives resources for survival.

=== Kwakwaka'wakw ===
Coming out of their traditional homeland, Kwakwa̱ka̱'wakw A̱wi'nagwis, the Kwakwa̱ka̱ʼwakw legal system remains administered through the potlatch institution, despite the Potlatch Ban which endured from 1884 to 1951. Like many other northern Cascadia coastal nations, the Kwakwa̱ka̱ʼwakw nation and its numerous community subdivisions, such as the Kwaguʼł, ʼNa̱mg̱is, and Dzawa̱da̱ʼenux̱w (amongst many others), maintain a complex body of laws surrounding property rights of treasures, namely songs, dances, coppers, regalia, names, crests, filled boxes, stories, and knowledge. In contradistinction with European legal systems, Kwakwa̱ka̱ʼwakw law understands societal structures as well as individual rights and obligations differently. Stories, songs, dances, and knowledge are passed down and traded through specific potlatch rituals, and dispute resolution occurs through ceremonies often done in big houses by specific, knowledgeable community leaders or Elders. As such, intellectual and property law differs markedly from Euro-Canadian legal systems, and conflict is still being resolved from the near-century long ban of a core institution. The Canadian State is currently in the process of reconciling its laws and historical policies with the Kwakwa̱ka̱ʼwakw Nation.

=== Métis ===
La lway michif, or Métis law, is derived from a blending of legal traditions between the Indigenous nations of the prairies, the European Canadians who settled in what would become the Métis homeland (Michif Piyii), and Christianity. As Métis culture is an oral culture, there remains a distinction between written and oral forms of Métis law, as most protocols surrounding the family and community continue to be exclusively transmitted orally.

The core foundation of Métis law rests upon inherited stories, such as of Ti-Jean, Wisahkecahk, and Nanbush, and ultimately centres the family, from which extend powers to the community, regional, and national levels where decisions are made by assembly. Elders function as mediators and advisors within the Métis legal structure, and ceremonies hold a core institutional rule. Justice is underlined by individual and communal rights where judicial decisions are obligated to be made in the context of a relationship of respect and trust. Dispute resolution hinges on being non-adversarial; decision-making is by consensus with universal suffrage with the whole community deciding on rules and limits to authority. Specific social structures also dictate certain functions, such as the correction of misbehaviour falling to godparents and grandparents, with male youth often being sent to live with uncles if problems persist, and women in charge of welcoming and protecting newcomers, with women's committees responsible for resolving cases of domestic violence. Historically, the Métis legal system included a general council in charge of supervising a policing organization called la garde.

=== Mi'kmaw ===
Mi'kma'ki is home to Netukulimk which is "the use of the natural bounty provided by the Creator for the self-support and well-being of the individual and the community. A foundation of Netukulimk is achieving adequate standards of community nutrition and economic well-being without jeopardizing the integrity, diversity, or productivity of our environment." Within the conceptual framework of Netukulimk, Mi'kmaw law functions as the foundation of sustaining Mi'kmaw families, communities, and society. This mindset understands the whole of life to be interconnected, describing the rights and responsibilities of the Mi’kmaq with their families, communities, nation, and eco-system.

=== Nêhiyaw ===
In the nêhiyaw language, "Cree laws" most directly translates as ᓀᐦᐃᔭᐤ ᐃᐧᔭᓯᐁᐧᐃᐧᓇ nêhiyaw wiyasowêwina which hosts the root /-asiw-/ meaning "to decide, judge, command". The more appropriate term when referencing Cree––or specifically Plains Cree (nêhiyaw)––law is Wahkohtowin (ᐋᐧᐦᑰᐦᑐᐃᐧᐣ) denoting kinship and codes of conduct flowing from one's own role within the community.

=== Secwépemc ===
In Secwepemcúl'ecw, the Shuswap people still maintain yirí7 re stsq’ey’s-kucw, also rendered as yerí7 re stsq̓ey̓s-kucw, meaning "our laws and customs". Secwépemc law, or Stsq̓ey, is understood through the stseptékwll (ancient oral histories) as being gifted to the Secwépemc by Sk’elép (Coyote). Stsq'ey governs the nation predominately through three fundamental laws:

- Secwepemc law of sovereignty (including the authority to make treaties);
- Secwepemc law that defines rights and access to resources and;
- Secwepemc laws of social and environmental responsibility (caretakership).

=== Syilx ===
Born from iʔ syilx iʔ temxʷulaʔxʷs, or Okanagan Country, Syilx law is defined through captikwł, "a collection of teachings about Syilx Okanagan laws, customs, values, governance structures and principles that, together, define and inform Syilx Okanagan rights and responsibilities to the land and to our culture". The Syilx Nation maintains ankc’xʷ̌iplaʔtntət uɬ yʕat iʔ ks səctxət̕stim ("our laws and responsibilities") as its core constitutional framework, from which derives Syilx values, citizenship, structures for dispute resolution, governmental authority, rights, and responsibilities, particularly those responsibilities from and to the tmixʷ, tmxʷulaxʷ, and siwłkʷ (partially translated as all living beings, the land, and the waters, respectively). The Syilx Okanagan Nation Alliance is currently in the process of rebuilding the nation and drafting a modern constitution.

=== Tŝilhqot'in ===
The name for Tŝilhqot'in law is Dechen Ts’edilhtan.

=== Wet'suwet'en ===
After conflict at the frontiers of Wet'suwet'en Country in British Columbia, the BC and Canadian governments signed a memorandum of understanding with the Wet'suwet'en Nation's hereditary chiefs in May 2020. The memorandum begins with these first two points:

1. "Canada and B.C. recognize that Wet’suwet’en rights and title are held by the Wet’suwet’en houses under their system of governance."
2. "Canada and B.C. recognize Wet’suwet’en aboriginal rights and title throughout the Yintah."

This memorandum affirms Anak Nu'at'en (or Inuk Nuatden as spelled by the MoU) as the Wet'suwet'en legal system of governance. The Wet'suwet'en system of governance is intimately tied to the hereditary chiefdom. Clan structures and governing chiefs are, in turn, intimately tied to Yin'tah, their lands.

=== W̱SÁNEĆ ===
Emerging from the land, or TEṈEW̱, the W̱SÁNEĆ term SKÁLS means "law" and "belief".

== See also ==
- Aboriginal land title in Canada
- The Canadian Crown and Indigenous peoples
- Indian Act
- Indian Health Transfer Policy (Canada)
- Indigenous court (Canada)
- Numbered Treaties
