= Marke Raines =

Canadian politician (1927–2020)

Member of the Canadian Parliament for Burnaby—Seymour
- In office 1974–1979
- Preceded by: Ed Nelson
- Succeeded by: The electoral district was abolished in 1979.

Personal details
- Born: January 18, 1927 Calgary, Alberta, Canada
- Died: April 10, 2020 (aged 93) Toronto, Ontario, Canada
- Party: Liberal
- Profession: anchorman, broadcaster, journalist, news reporter/announcer

Marke Raines (January 18, 1927 – April 10, 2020) was a Liberal member of the House of Commons of Canada. He was previously a broadcaster and journalist for radio stations CJJC, CKNW and CJOR and television station BCTV.

Born in Calgary, Alberta, Raines gained notoriety as a CKNW radio reporter when in 1964 he made an unauthorised crossing of the Port Mann Bridge, as the facility had not yet been opened to the public.

He was elected in the Burnaby—Seymour riding in the 1974 general election, but did not seek another term in the House of Commons after finishing his term in 1979 in the 30th Canadian Parliament. He was appointed a part-time member of the Canadian Radio-television and Telecommunications Commission in 1981 for a five-year term. Raines died of heart failure on April 10, 2020, in Toronto.
