= Svend Robinson =

Canadian politician (born 1952)

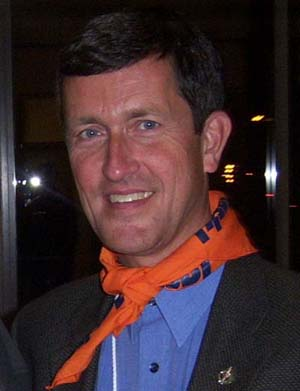
- Svend Robinson at the January 2003 NDP convention in Toronto, Ontario

Member of Parliament for Burnaby—Douglas (Burnaby—Kingsway; 1988–1997) (Burnaby; 1979–1988)
- In office May 22, 1979 – June 28, 2004
- Preceded by: Riding established
- Succeeded by: Bill Siksay

Personal details
- Born: March 4, 1952 (age 74) Minneapolis, Minnesota, U.S.
- Party: New Democratic
- Spouses: Patricia Fraser (1972–1975); Max Riveron (1994–present)
- Education: University of British Columbia (JD)
- Occupation: Politician

Svend Robinson (born March 4, 1952) is a Canadian politician. He was a member of Parliament (MP) from 1979 to 2004, representing suburban Vancouver-area constituencies in the city of Burnaby for the New Democratic Party (NDP). He was the first member of Parliament in Canadian history to come out as gay while in office. In 2004, he pleaded guilty to stealing an expensive ring and decided not to run in the June 2004 election. At the time, he was one of the longest-serving members in the House of Commons, having been elected and re-elected for seven consecutive terms. In the 2019 Canadian federal election, Robinson was the NDP candidate for the riding of Burnaby North—Seymour but lost to Liberal incumbent Terry Beech by 1,560 votes.

== Early life ==
Robinson was born in Minneapolis, Minnesota, United States, of Danish descent, to Edith Jensen and Wayne Robinson. His father opposed the Vietnam War and brought his family to live in Canada. Robinson attended high school at Burnaby North Secondary. He later obtained a law degree from the University of British Columbia, and completed post-graduate work in international law at the London School of Economics.

He was called to the British Columbia Bar as a barrister and solicitor in 1978, and practised law with Robert Gardner and Associates until his election to the House of Commons in May 1979.

Prior to coming out as gay, Robinson was married to Patricia Fraser, his high-school girlfriend, from 1972 to 1975.

== Politics ==
Robinson was the NDP MP for ridings in the Vancouver suburb of Burnaby, British Columbia, the third-largest city in British Columbia.

As the longest-serving British Columbia MP of his time, in office from 1979 to 2004, Robinson is notable for having been the first Canadian MP to come out as gay, in the spring of 1988. He was the only openly LGBT member of the Canadian House of Commons until Bloc Québécois MP Réal Ménard came out in 1994.

Robinson is known for his negative views on American foreign policy, especially towards Cuba, his challenge of corporate power, his criticism of Israel, and his strong support for Palestinian leaders. NDP leader Alexa McDonough briefly removed Robinson's portfolio over Middle East issues in 2002 for comments he made criticizing the Israeli government for alleged war crimes in Jenin.

One of his earliest political activities was leading a group of NDP MPs who heckled former US President Ronald Reagan while he was speaking at the House of Commons in support of the Strategic Defense Initiative and aid to the Contras. He was a long-time activist in the anti-apartheid movement and was a member of the official Canadian delegation to the 1994 South African election. Robinson has also been critical of the Chinese government for its treatment of political dissidents and for its policies in Tibet. He was a founder of the Canadian wing of Parliamentarians for East Timor. He was active in international parliamentary groups, including serving as rapporteur and chair of the Organization for Security and Co-operation in Europe's Parliamentary Assembly Human Rights and Development Committee.

Robinson was a leader in the movement for the right to physician-assisted death, fighting for the right of well-known ALS patient Sue Rodriguez to choose when to end her life with the assistance of a physician. He was ultimately present at her bedside at the time of her physician-assisted death.

A strong environmentalist, he engaged in peaceful civil disobedience to block logging of old-growth forests at Lyell Island in Haida Gwaii in 1985 and at Clayoquot Sound on the west coast of Vancouver Island in 1993. For the latter action, he was sentenced to 14 days of imprisonment. Robinson was also an outspoken advocate of the rights of aboriginal peoples both in Canada and internationally. He stood at barricades with the Penan people in Sarawak, Malaysia and was condemned by Prime Minister Mahathir Mohamad. He was adopted into the Haida Nation, and given the Haida name "White Swan" by Haida elder Ada Yovanovich.

Robinson ran to succeed Audrey McLaughlin as leader of the NDP at the 1995 NDP leadership convention. He won the first ballot, and had won regional primaries in Ontario, Quebec, and British Columbia. Ahead of the second ballot between himself and Alexa McDonough, Robinson noticed last-place candidate Lorne Nystrom's delegates were moving disproportionately to McDonough. Realizing that McDonough would likely pick up enough support from Nystrom's delegates to eliminate any realistic chance of him winning, Robinson conceded to McDonough before the second ballot. On a motion by Robinson, McDonough was acclaimed as leader.

On December 31, 1997, Robinson was injured in a hiking accident on Galiano Island, breaking his jaw and ankle.

Robinson was involved in the New Politics Initiative, an effort to build a new progressive political party in Canada closely linked with social movements and labour, and the NDP's renewal process, although he remained committed to the party after the NPI's defeat at the 2001 general convention in Winnipeg. He was an early and strong supporter of former national NDP Leader Jack Layton.

In 2003, Liberal Senator Jerry Grafstein suggested that September 11 be designated as "America Day" to commemorate the American victims of September 11, 2001. Robinson proposed that the day also be designated as "Chile Day", to mark the overthrow of Chilean president Salvador Allende's democratically elected government on September 11, 1973. Neither proposal was accepted.

Robinson successfully sponsored legislation in parliament in 2004 to include sexual orientation in federal hate crimes legislation. He was also active on HIV/AIDS issues from the start of the epidemic in the early 1980s.

== Admission to theft and end of political career ==
In April 2004, shortly before the 2004 election, Robinson admitted to the theft of an expensive ring from a public auction site. He turned himself in to the Royal Canadian Mounted Police, and returned the ring shortly after police visited his home and office, wishing to speak with him. While the auction company publicly stated that they did not wish to pursue charges, Robinson was charged and pleaded guilty. The Crown and defence agreed that he was undergoing major personal stress and mental health issues at the time; Robinson was given a discharge, meaning that he would have no criminal record, but he volunteered for some time at the Burnaby Wildlife Centre as part of a public service commitment. He terminated his candidacy and was replaced by his longtime constituency assistant Bill Siksay, who won the election.

Robinson was subsequently diagnosed with cyclothymia, a form of bipolar disorder, and began to speak as an activist on mental health issues.

Robinson attempted a comeback and ran as an NDP candidate in the 2006 federal election, challenging Liberal MP Hedy Fry in the riding of Vancouver Centre. Despite an improved result for the NDP provincewide, Fry easily won reelection in her riding, where the NDP vote fell by 3.6 per cent.

In the 2019 Canadian General Election Robinson was nominated as the NDP candidate in Burnaby North—Seymour, where he faced Liberal incumbent Terry Beech and lost by 1,560 votes.

== Post-political career ==
Since leaving politics, Robinson was employed by the British Columbia Government and Service Employees' Union as an arbitrator and advocate. He also served on the NDP's federal executive as co-chair of the party's LGBT Committee.

Robinson took a position in 2007 with the global trade union federation Public Services International in Switzerland, where he moved with his partner Max Riveron. He led PSI's work on a range of issues including climate change, pensions, and trade. In 2009, he was co-chair of the International LGBT Human Rights Conference in Copenhagen, and received an award from the Conseil québécois des gais et lesbiennes for his human rights activism.

He served as a consultant with the Global Fund to Fight AIDS, Tuberculosis and Malaria, coordinating their parliamentary relations. He retired from the organization when he reached its mandatory retirement age of 65.

In 2020–21, Robinson was the J.S. Woodsworth resident scholar at Simon Fraser University. The position was named after the former CCF leader and MP J. S. Woodsworth.

In the 2026 New Democratic Party leadership election, Robinson supported Avi Lewis.

== Electoral record ==
=== Burnaby North—Seymour; 2019 ===
2019 Canadian federal election: Burnaby North—Seymour
Party	Candidate	Votes	%	±%	Expenditures
Liberal	Terry Beech	17,770	35.50	–0.59	$93,319.78
New Democratic	Svend Robinson	16,185	32.33	+2.73	$97,660.91
Conservative	Heather Leung	9,734	19.45	–8.40	$92,995.62
Green	Amita Kuttner	4,801	9.59	+4.32	$13,982.95
People's	Rocky Dong	1,079	2.16	–	$7,115.13
Independent	Robert Taylor	271	0.54	–	none listed
Libertarian	Lewis C. Dahlby	219	0.44	–0.04	none listed
Total valid votes/expense limit		50,059	99.08	–	$106,341.17
Total rejected ballots		466	0.92	+0.43	
Turnout		50,525	64.80	–5.54	
Eligible voters		77,969			
Liberal hold		Swing		–1.66	
Heather Leung was dropped by the Conservative Party of Canada after past homophobic remarks were made public, but still appeared on the ballot papers.
Source: Elections Canada

=== Vancouver Centre; 2006 ===
2006 Canadian federal election: Vancouver Centre
Party	Candidate	Votes	%	±%	Expenditures
Liberal	Hedy Fry	25,013	43.80	+3.49	$78,549.88
New Democratic	Svend Robinson	16,374	28.67	–3.62	$85,910.46
Conservative	Tony Fogarassy	11,684	20.46	+1.26	$80,430.10
Green	Jared Evans	3,340	5.85	–0.93	$1,008.00
Libertarian	John Clarke	304	0.53	–0.04	none listed
Marijuana	Heathcliff Dionysus Campbell	259	0.45	–	$163.15
Christian Heritage	Joe Pal	130	0.23	–0.23	$367.31
Total valid votes/expense limit		57,104	99.72	–	$86,257.47
Total rejected ballots		163	0.28	–0.14	
Turnout		57,267	62.06	+0.58	
Eligible voters		92,284			
Liberal hold		Swing		+3.56	
Source: Elections Canada

=== Burnaby—Douglas;1997-2004 ===
2000 Canadian federal election
Party	Candidate	Votes	%	±%	Expenditures
New Democratic	Svend Robinson	17,018	37.38	-5.70	$50,374
Alliance	Alan McDonnell	15,057	33.08	+6.53	$49,282
Liberal	Francesca Zumpano	10,774	23.67	-2.41	$57,489
Progressive Conservative	Kenneth Edgar King	2,477	5.44	+2.05	$12,954
Communist	Roger Perkins	198	0.41	–	$189
Total valid votes		45,515	100.0		
Total rejected ballots		225	0.49	+0.03	
Turnout		45,740	62.34	-5.71	
New Democratic hold		Swing		-6.12	
Change for the Canadian Alliance is based on the Reform Party.

1997 Canadian federal election
Party	Candidate	Votes	%	Expenditures
New Democratic	Svend Robinson	19,058	43.08	$45,632
Reform	Gary Eyre	11,743	26.55	$38,897
Liberal	Mobina Jaffer	11,536	26.08	$55,707
Progressive Conservative	Ray Power	1,498	3.39	$9,924
Natural Law	Valerie Hubert	300	0.68	
Marxist–Leninist	Brian Sproule	103	0.23	
Total valid votes		44,238	100.0	
Total rejected ballots		203	0.46	
Turnout		44,441	68.05	
This riding was created from parts of New Westminster—Burnaby and Burnaby—Kingsway, which elected a Reform and a New Democrat, respectively, in the last election. New Democrat Svend Robinson was the incumbent from Burnaby—Kingsway.

=== Burnaby—Kingsway; 1988–1997 ===
1993 Canadian federal election
Party	Candidate	Votes	%	±%
New Democratic	Svend Robinson	18,287	33.94	-9.28
Liberal	Kwangyul Peck	14,130	26.23	+4.01
Reform	John Carpay	13,463	24.99	+22.32
Progressive Conservative	Adele Haines	5,353	9.94	-20.06
National	Daniel Fontaine	1,562	2.90	–
Natural Law	Deborah Rubin	375	0.70	–
Libertarian	Carlo Nigro	373	0.69	-0.30
Independent	Poldi Meindl	130	0.24	+0.08
Commonwealth of Canada	Mike Milkovich	117	0.22	–
Independent	Byrun F. Tylor	50	0.09	–
Marxist–Leninist	Joseph Theriault	39	0.07	–
Total valid votes		53,879	100.0	
New Democratic hold		Swing		-6.64

1988 Canadian federal election
Party	Candidate	Votes	%
New Democratic	Svend Robinson	25,150	43.22
Progressive Conservative	John Bitonti	17,455	30.00
Liberal	Samuel Stevens	12,933	22.22
Reform	John L. Soanes	1,552	2.67
Libertarian	Mark J.T. Lane	575	0.99
Green	Sunee Yuuho	231	0.40
Independent	David John Bader	203	0.35
Independent	Poldi Meindl	93	0.16
Total valid votes		58,192	100.0
This riding was created from parts of Burnaby, North Vancouver—Burnaby and Vancouver Kingsway, which elected two New Democrats and one Progressive Conservative (North Vancouver—Burnaby) in the previous election. Svend Robinson was the incumbent from Burnaby.

=== Burnaby; 1979–1988 ===
1984 Canadian federal election
Party	Candidate	Votes	%	±%
New Democratic	Svend Robinson	28,318	48.00	+5.57
Progressive Conservative	Bill Langas	20,697	35.09	-1.51
Liberal	Mike Hillman	9,612	16.29	-4.52
Green	Blair T. Longley	364	0.62	–
Total valid votes		58,991	100.0	
New Democratic hold		Swing		+3.54

1980 Canadian federal election
Party	Candidate	Votes	%	±%
New Democratic	Svend Robinson	21,587	42.43	+2.67
Progressive Conservative	Hugh Mawby	18,619	36.60	-0.29
Liberal	Doreen A. Lawson	10,585	20.81	-2.54
Marxist–Leninist	Brian K. Sproule	81	0.16	–
Total valid votes		50,872	100.0	
New Democratic hold		Swing		+1.48

1979 Canadian federal election
Party	Candidate	Votes	%
New Democratic	Svend Robinson	20,604	39.76
Progressive Conservative	Hugh Mawby	19,119	36.89
Liberal	Doreen A. Lawson	12,099	23.35
Total valid votes		51,822	100.0
This riding was created from parts of Burnaby—Richmond—Delta, Burnaby—Seymour and New Westminster, which elected a Progressive Conservative, a Liberal and a New Democrat, respectively, in the last election.

== Biography ==
Svend Robinson: A Life in Politics, written by Graeme Truelove, was released on October 17, 2013, by New Star Books. In the book, Truelove argues that Robinson was the single most influential Member of Parliament in Canadian history never to have served in the Cabinet of Canada.

== Awards and honours ==
- L'Ordre de la Pleiade, Chevalier, 1990 For exceptional service to La Francophonie
- Award for Human Rights, May 1993 Lambda Foundation.
- The Edith Adamson Award for Leadership in Issues of Conscience in 1995.
- Elena Gil Iberoamerican Award on Ethics, June 1995 Felix Varela Centre, Cuba.
- Tom Stoddard National Role Model Award, May 1997 presented by PrideFest America.
- Hero Award, Sexual Orientation and Gender Identity in August 1999 by The Canadian Bar Association.
- Presidents Award, 2003 Canadian Arab Federation.
- Kurdish Human Rights Prize, Adar 2614.
- Grand prix du CQGL 2009, decerned by Conseil québécois des gais et lesbiennes at Gala Arc-en-Ciel
- Panelist at the conference to mark the 20th Anniversary of the Canadian Charter of Rights and Freedoms, discussing "The Making of s.15: Collaboration by Government, Community Activists and Legal Experts."
- Member of Canadian Committee for 50th Anniversary of United Nations, 1995
