= Canadian Aboriginal law =

Canadian law regarding indigenous people

Canadian Aboriginal law is the body of law of Canada that concerns a variety of issues related to Indigenous peoples in Canada. Canadian Aboriginal Law is different from Canadian Indigenous law: In Canada, Indigenous Law refers to the legal traditions, customs, and practices of Indigenous peoples and groups. Aboriginal peoples as a collective noun is a specific term of art used in legal documents, including the Constitution Act, 1982, and includes First Nations, Inuit and Métis people. Canadian Aboriginal law provides certain constitutionally recognized rights to land and traditional practices. Canadian Aboriginal Law enforces and interprets certain treaties between the Crown and Indigenous people, and manages much of their interaction. A major area of Aboriginal law involves the duty to consult and accommodate.

== Sources ==
=== Aboriginal law ===
Aboriginal law is based on a variety of written and unwritten legal sources. The Royal Proclamation of 1763 is the foundation document creating special land rights for Indigenous peoples within Canada (which was called "Quebec" in 1763).

Section 91(24) of the Constitution Act, 1867 gives the federal parliament exclusive power to legislate in matters related to "Indians, and Lands reserved for the Indians". Under this power, that legislative body has enacted the Indian Act, First Nations Land Management Act, Indian Oil and Gas Act, Department of Crown-Indigenous Relations and Northern Affairs Act and the Department of Indigenous Services Act.

Part II of the Constitution Act, 1982, recognizes Aboriginal treaty and land rights, with section 35 being particularly important. Section 35's recognition of Aboriginal rights refers to an ancient source of Aboriginal rights in custom.

=== Indigenous law ===
Canadian Indigenous law refers to Indigenous peoples' own legal systems. This includes the laws and legal processes developed by Indigenous groups to govern their relationships, manage their natural resources, and manage conflicts. Indigenous law is developed from a variety of sources and institutions which differ across legal traditions.

=== Indigenous self government ===
Indigenous or Aboriginal self-government refers to proposals to give governments representing the Indigenous peoples in Canada greater powers of government. These proposals range from giving Aboriginal governments powers similar to that of local governments in Canada to demands that Indigenous governments be recognized as sovereign, and capable of "nation-to-nation" negotiations as legal equals to the Crown (i.e. the Canadian state), as well as many other variations.

== Treaties ==
The Monarchy of Canada and the Indigenous peoples of Canada began interactions in North America during the European colonization period. The Royal Proclamation of 1763 recognized Indigenous title and the Treaty of Niagara of 1764 bound the Crown and the Indigenous peoples of the Great Lakes basin together in a familial relationship, a relationship that exists to this day, exemplified by First Nations attendance at the coronation of King Charles III. Post-Confederation Canada adopted a paternalistic approach and imposed an approach as though the nation-to-nation relationship did not exist, administering relations solely under Canadian law.

== Act ==
The Indian Act (French: Loi sur les Indiens) is a Canadian Act of Parliament that concerns registered Indians, their bands, and the system of Indian reserves. (Note: Indian has been used in keeping with article name guidelines because of the historical nature of the article and the precision of the name, similar to Canadian Indian residential school system. The use of the name also provides relevant context about the era in which the legislation was established, specifically one in which Indigenous peoples in Canada were homogeneously referred to as Indians rather than by language that distinguishes First Nations, Inuit and Métis peoples. Use of Indian is limited throughout the page to proper nouns and references to government legislation.) First passed in 1876 and still in force with amendments, it is the primary document that defines how the Government of Canada interacts with the 614 First Nation bands in Canada and their members. Throughout its long history, the act has been a subject of controversy and has been interpreted in different ways by both Indigenous Canadians and non-Indigenous Canadians. The legislation has been amended many times, including "over five major changes" made in 2002.

== Aboriginal land title in Canada ==
In Canada, aboriginal title is considered a sui generis interest in land. Aboriginal title has been described this way in order to distinguish it from other proprietary interests, but also due to the fact its characteristics cannot be explained by reference either to only the common law rules of real property, or to only the rules of property found in Indigenous legal systems. The Supreme Court of Canada has characterised the idea that aboriginal title is sui generis as the unifying principle underlying the various dimensions of that title. Aboriginal title is properly construed as neither a real right nor a personal right, despite the fact that it appears to share characteristics of both real and personal rights. Aboriginal title refers to the concept of a sui generis right in land that originates from the exclusive occupation and use of a specific territory by an aboriginal group over which the group has a native historic attachment.

== See also ==
- The Canadian Crown and Indigenous peoples
- Indian Health Transfer Policy (Canada)
- Numbered Treaties
- Cree law, an example of Indigenous Law
- Jack Woodward
- Settler colonialism in Canada
- Canadian genocide of Indigenous peoples
- Indian hospitals

== Bibliography ==
- Asch, Michael (1998). Aboriginal and treaty rights in Canada : essays on law, equality, and respect for difference. University of British Columbia Press. ISBN 0-7748-0581-1.
- Belanger, Yale D. (2014). Ways of Knowing: An Introduction to Native Studies in Canada. Toronto, ON: Nelson.
- Bell, Catherine; Robert K. Paterson (2009). Protection of First Nations Cultural Heritage: Laws, Policy, and Reform. UBC Press. ISBN 978-0-7748-1463-8.
- Bell, Catherine; Val Napoleon (2008). First Nations Cultural Heritage and Law: Case Studies, Voices, and Perspectives. UBC Press. ISBN 978-0-7748-1461-4.
- Borrows, John (2002). Recovering Canada: the resurgence of Indigenous law. University of Toronto Press. ISBN 0-8020-3679-1.
- Cote, Philip; Tidridge, Nathan (2024). "Ties of Kinship". Canada's History. No. October-November 2024.
- Dupuis, Renée (2002). Justice for Canada's Aboriginal peoples. James Lorimer and Company. ISBN 1-55028-775-3.
- Gibson, Gordon (2009). A New Look at Canadian Indian Policy: Respect the Collective - Promote the Individual. Vancouver: Fraser Institute. ISBN 978-0-88975-243-6.
- Woodward Q.C., Jack (1989–2016). Native Law. Carswell. ISBN 0-459-33271-6.
