= Nels Nelson (politician) =

Canadian politician

Nels Edwin Nelson
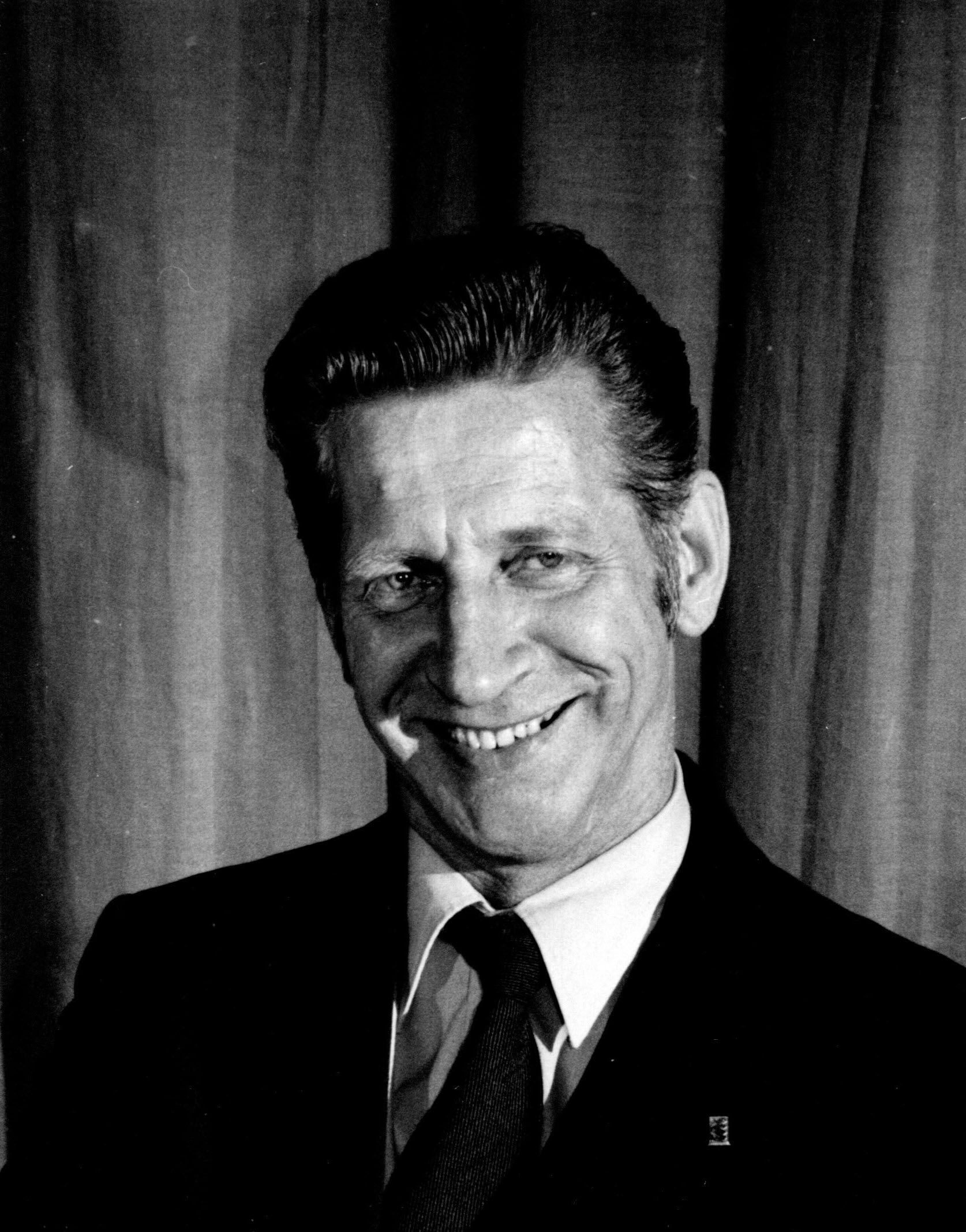

Member of Parliament for Burnaby—Seymour
- In office October 30, 1972 – July 8, 1974
- Preceded by: Ray Perrault
- Succeeded by: Marke Raines

Personal details
- Born: September 7, 1917 Mullan, Idaho, U.S.
- Died: July 13, 1992 (aged 74) Vancouver, British Columbia, Canada
- Party: New Democratic
- Profession: teacher

Nels Edwin Nelson (September 7, 1917 – July 13, 1992) was a Canadian politician who served as a New Democratic Party member of the House of Commons of Canada. He was a teacher by career.

Nelson made two attempts to become a Member of Parliament at Alberta's Wetaskiwin riding in the 1965 and 1968 federal elections.

He was first elected at the Burnaby—Seymour riding in the 1972 general election and served in the 29th Canadian Parliament, but was defeated there by Marke Raines of the Liberal Party in the 1974 federal election and made no further attempts to return to federal office.

On 13 July 1992, Nelson died of a heart attack in Vancouver.
