= Tutchone =

Tutchone may refer to:

- Northern Tutchone, a First Nations people of central Yukon Territory in Canada
- Southern Tutchone, a First Nations people of southern Yukon Territory
- Tutchone language, an Athabaskan language spoken by the Tutchone people
