= Jack Woodward =

Canadian lawyer (born 1951)

Jack Woodward KC
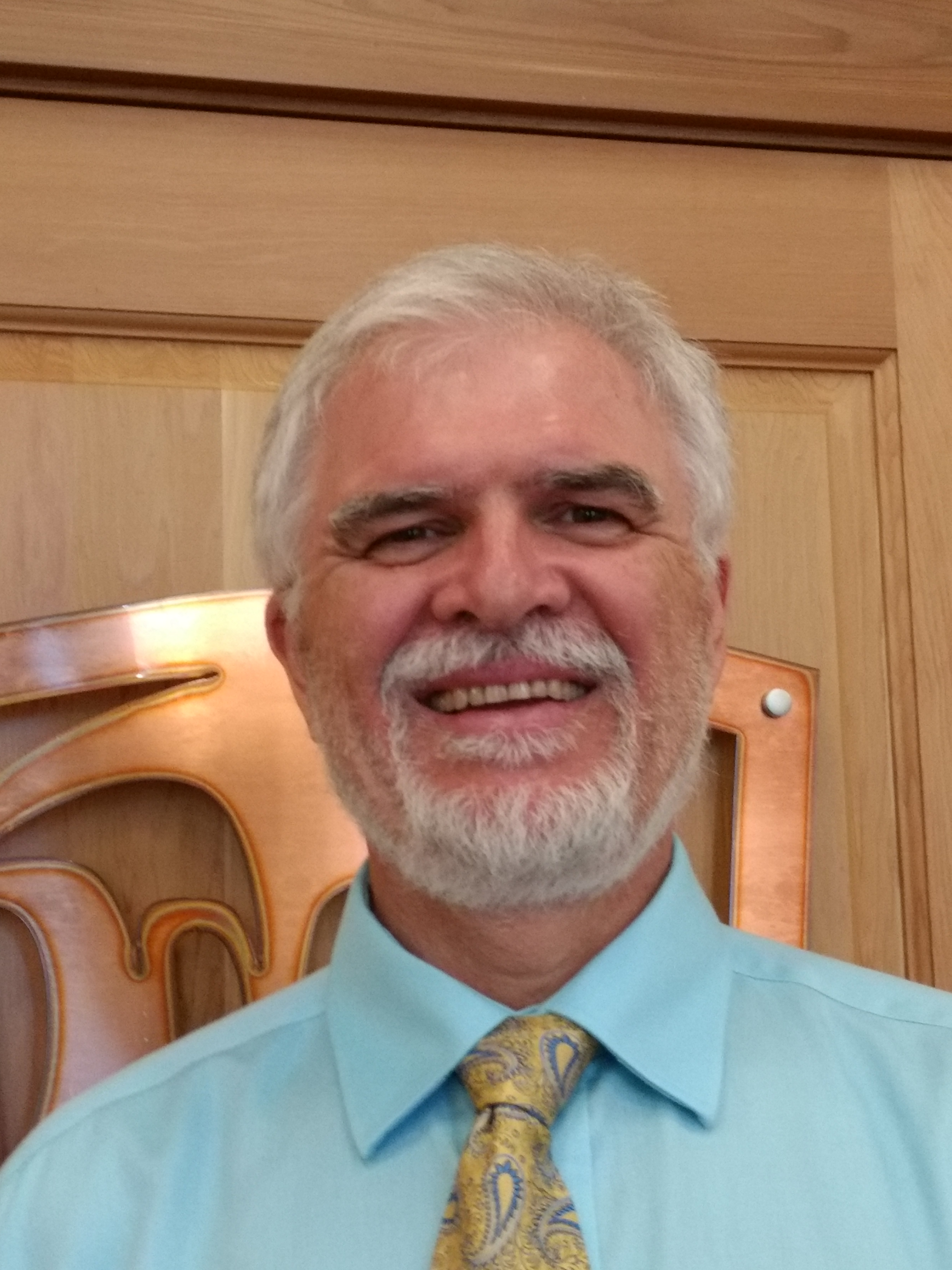
- Woodward in 2018
- Born: 3 October 1951 (age 74); New Westminster, British Columbia, Canada
- Education: University of British Columbia; University of Victoria
- Occupation: Lawyer
- Political party: New Democratic Party
- Website: jackwoodward.ca

Jack Woodward KC (born 3 October 1951) is a Canadian lawyer. He specializes in Canadian Aboriginal law and is the author of Aboriginal Law in Canada, a leading publication on the subject.

Woodward has represented numerous First Nations groups in landmark cases including Tsilhqot'in Nation v British Columbia, the first successful Aboriginal title claim in Canada.

Woodward has practiced law since 1979, primarily in the areas of Aboriginal law and environmental law. He has represented more than a hundred First Nations groups and organizations in a wide variety of legal actions including the landmark case, Tsilhqot'in Nation v British Columbia, the first successful Aboriginal title claim in Canada.

Woodward wrote the first draft of section 35 of the Constitution Act, 1982, which provides constitutional protection to the indigenous and treaty rights of indigenous peoples in Canada. Ian Waddell, in his book Take the Torch: A Political Memoir, states that Woodward drafted the clause in January 1981, during negotiations in Ottawa with Minister of Justice Jean Chrétien. This is also referred to in the book Box of Treasures or Empty Box? Twenty Years of Section 35 on page 18.

Woodward established the legal firm Woodward and Company in Victoria, B.C. He was also an adjunct professor of law at the University of Victoria for nineteen years, where he was instrumental in creating the university's first course in Aboriginal law.

In December 2011 Woodward was instated as a Queen's Counsel for the Canadian province of British Columbia.

In 2015, the Law Society of British Columbia suspended Woodward for issuing cheques with insufficient funds. As a result, Woodward was suspended from practicing for one month.

== Publications ==
Aboriginal Law is a comprehensive collection of all the laws in Canada relating specifically to Aboriginal people. International law, constitutional law, statute, common law and custom are all covered, with updates six times per year and frequent revisions to whole chapters and sections in this rapidly-evolving field. Native Law was reviewed by the Alberta Law Review Society which described the text as, "a valuable aid for legal researchers who wish to establish a background in the subject area as well as for practitioners who need to know what law applies to specific issues before them."

== Notable legal cases ==
=== Tsilhqot’in Nation v. BC, 2014 ===
Tsilhqot’in Nation v. British Columbia is a landmark decision of the Supreme Court of Canada and the first case to successfully establish a declaration of Aboriginal title over land that a nation had historically occupied. The underlying circumstances that established the reasoning behind that case begin in 1983 when the province issued licence to Carrier Lumber to begin logging in the remote areas of central British Columbia which was claimed by the Xeni Gwet'in band of the Tsilhqot'in Nation. The Xeni Gwet'in filed suit seeking a court declaration that would prohibit Carrier Lumber's commercial logging operations in this area, and establish their claim for Aboriginal title to the land. After five years at trial, both the federal and provincial governments opposed the title claim which resulted to a final appeal to the Supreme Court of Canada. The Supreme Court, led by Chief Justice Beverly McLachlin, unanimously allowed the appeal. The Supreme Court of Canada ruled that the Tsilhqot'in people were entitled to a declaration of Aboriginal title to the 1,750 square kilometre region they had historically occupied.

=== Fort McKay First Nation v Prosper Petroleum Ltd, 2020 ===
On 24 April 2020, the Alberta Court of Appeal released a decision in Fort McKay First Nation v Prosper Petroleum Ltd, allowing Fort McKay First Nation's (FMFN) challenge to the Alberta Energy Regulator's (AER) decision to approve Prosper Petroleum's oil sands project. In granting its approval of the project, the AER did not consider the negotiations between the Alberta government and FMFN over land management and the impacts of future oil sands development on FMFN’s Treaty 9 rights. The Alberta Court of Appeal determined that the failure to consider these negotiations in the AER decision was not in keeping with the honour of the Crown. The court vacated the project approval and directed the Alberta Energy Regulator to reconsider whether the project is in the public’s best interest after considering FMFN's Treaty 8 rights.
