= Housekeeping provision =

In Canada, statutes are one of the primary sources of law. A statute ends with housekeeping provisions, which are sections covering the details of the statute, such as the date of coming into force and the right of officials who administer the statute to make regulations under the statute.
