= Burnaby—Seymour =

Former federal electoral district in British Columbia, Canada

British Columbia electoral district
- Boundaries at abolition

Defunct federal electoral district
- Legislature: House of Commons
- District created: 1966
- District abolished: 1976
- First contested: 1968
- Last contested: 1974

Burnaby—Seymour was a federal electoral district in the province of British Columbia, Canada, that was represented in the House of Commons of Canada from 1968 to 1979. This riding was created in 1966 from parts of Burnaby—Coquitlam, Burnaby—Richmond and Coast—Capilano ridings. The riding originally consisted of the eastern part of North Vancouver plus areas of Burnaby north of the Grandview Highway and Edmonds Avenue, west of Sperling and north of Pandora Street. That is, North Vancouver east of Lynn Creek plus the Burnaby Heights, Capitol Hill, Brentwood and Deer Lake neighbourhoods of Burnaby.

The riding's first election in 1968, is notable for being a showdown between the former leader of the British Columbia Liberal Party, Ray Perrault, and federal New Democratic Party leader Tommy Douglas. Given that the North Shore portions of the riding were largely affluent and upper middle class in character and normally a Liberal bastion, Douglas' strong showing is not so surprising given the working-class and labour background of much of even the better-off parts of the riding in Burnaby.

When this riding was redistributed in 1976, the resulting Burnaby riding consistently returned NDP candidates - this was Svend Robinson's longtime seat. North Vancouver—Burnaby returned a Progressive Conservative member (Chuck Cook) since its creation until it was abolished in 1987, as did its successor riding, the seat of North Vancouver until Reform Party member Ted White took over the seat on Cook's retirement.

In provincial politics, the equivalent area of North Vancouver was among the last holdouts of the provincial Liberal Party prior to it losing its support base to the Social Credit Party in the early 1980s. Jim Nielsen, who first unsuccessfully ran for the Progressive Conservative Party in Burnaby—Seymour in 1974 was subsequently elected in the 1975 provincial election as the MLA for Richmond. He was appointed as a cabinet minister and remained the MLA for Richmond until his resignation from provincial politics in 1986.

== Members of Parliament ==
Parliament	Years	Member	Party
Riding created from Burnaby—Coquitlam, Burnaby—Richmond and Coast—Capilano
28th	1968–1972	Ray Perrault	Liberal
29th	1972–1974	Nels Nelson	New Democratic
30th	1974–1979	Marke Raines	Liberal
Riding dissolved into Burnaby and North Vancouver—Burnaby

== Election results ==
1974 Canadian federal election
Party	Candidate	Votes	%	±%
Liberal	Marke Raines	18,063	36.58	–0.61
Progressive Conservative	Jim Nielsen	17,574	35.59	+12.60
New Democratic	Nels Nelson	13,472	27.28	–10.50
Communist	Eric Waugh	167	0.34	+0.09
Marxist–Leninist	Jack Maley	60	0.12	–
No affiliation	André Doucet	42	0.09	–
Total valid votes		49,378	99.71	
Total rejected ballots		143	0.29	–0.14
Turnout		49,521	74.64	–0.82
Eligible voters		66,348		
Liberal gain from New Democratic		Swing		+5.56
Source: Library of Parliament

1972 Canadian federal election
Party	Candidate	Votes	%	±%
New Democratic	Nels Nelson	18,274	37.79	–7.10
Liberal	Ray Perrault	17,985	37.19	–8.05
Progressive Conservative	John Ratel	11,119	22.99	+14.89
Social Credit	John B. MacDonald	694	1.44	–0.34
Independent	Bob Thompson	133	0.28	–
No affiliation	Eric Waugh	120	0.25	–
No affiliation	Lorette Glasheen	36	0.07	–
Total valid votes		48,361	99.58	
Total rejected ballots		206	0.42	–0.11
Turnout		48,567	75.46	–3.65
Eligible voters		64,363		
New Democratic gain from Liberal		Swing		–
Source: Library of Parliament

1968 Canadian federal election
Party	Candidate	Votes	%	±%
Liberal	Ray Perrault	17,891	45.23	–
New Democratic	Tommy Douglas	17,753	44.89	–
Progressive Conservative	Charles MacLean	3,206	8.11	–
Social Credit	Ron Price	702	1.78	–
Total valid votes		39,552	99.46	
Total rejected ballots		214	0.54	–
Turnout		39,766	79.11	–
Eligible voters		50,269		
Liberal notional gain		Swing		–
This riding was created from parts of Burnaby—Coquitlam, Burnaby—Richmond and Coast—Capilano, which elected two New Democrats and a Liberal (Coast—Capilano). Tommy Douglas was the incumbent from Burnaby—Coquitlam.
Source: Library of Parliament

== Successor ridings ==
The riding was abolished in 1976. Successor ridings were:

- Burnaby
- North Vancouver—Burnaby

== See also ==
- List of Canadian electoral districts
- Historical federal electoral districts of Canada
