= Burnaby (federal electoral district) =

Former federal electoral district in British Columbia, Canada

British Columbia electoral district

Defunct federal electoral district
- Legislature: House of Commons
- District created: 1976
- District abolished: 1987
- First contested: 1979
- Last contested: 1984

Burnaby was a federal electoral district in British Columbia, Canada, that was represented in the House of Commons of Canada from 1979 to 1988. This riding was created in 1976 from parts of Burnaby—Richmond—Delta, Burnaby—Seymour and New Westminster ridings

It was abolished in 1987 when it was redistributed into Burnaby—Kingsway and New Westminster—Burnaby ridings.

== Members of Parliament ==
Burnaby
Parliament	Years	Member	Party
Riding created from Burnaby—Richmond—Delta, Burnaby—Seymour and New Westminster
31st	1979–1980	Svend Robinson	New Democratic
32nd	1980–1984	Svend Robinson	New Democratic
33rd	1984–1988	Svend Robinson	New Democratic
Riding dissolved into Burnaby—Kingsway and New Westminster—Burnaby

== Election results ==
1984 Canadian federal election
Party	Candidate	Votes	%	±%
New Democratic	Svend Robinson	28,318	48.00	+5.57
Progressive Conservative	Bill Langas	20,697	35.09	–1.52
Liberal	Mike Hillman	9,612	16.29	–4.51
Green	Blair Longley	364	0.62	–
Total valid votes		58,991	99.66	
Total rejected ballots		199	0.34	+0.06
Turnout		59,190	79.14	+8.28
Eligible voters		74,795		
New Democratic hold		Swing		+3.54
Source: Elections Canada

1980 Canadian federal election
Party	Candidate	Votes	%	±%
New Democratic	Svend Robinson	21,587	42.43	+2.68
Progressive Conservative	Hugh Mawby	18,619	36.60	–0.29
Liberal	Doreen A. Lawson	10,585	20.81	–2.54
Marxist–Leninist	Brian Sproule	81	0.16	–
Total valid votes		50,872	99.72	
Total rejected ballots		141	0.28	+0.03
Turnout		51,013	70.86	–6.13
Eligible voters		71,992		
New Democratic hold		Swing		+1.48
Source: Elections Canada

1979 Canadian federal election
Party	Candidate	Votes	%	±%
New Democratic	Svend Robinson	20,604	39.76	–
Progressive Conservative	Hugh Mawby	19,119	36.89	–
Liberal	Doreen A. Lawson	12,099	23.35	–
Total valid votes		51,822	99.75	
Total rejected ballots		129	0.25	–
Turnout		51,951	76.99	–
Eligible voters		67,474		
New Democratic notional gain		Swing		–
This riding was created from parts of Burnaby—Richmond—Delta, Burnaby—Seymour and New Westminster, which elected a Progressive Conservative, a Liberal and a New Democrat, respectively, in the last election.
Source: Elections Canada

== See also ==
- List of Canadian electoral districts
- Historical federal electoral districts of Canada
