= Burnaby—Kingsway =

Former federal electoral district in British Columbia, Canada

British Columbia electoral district
- Boundaries at abolition

Defunct federal electoral district
- Legislature: House of Commons
- District created: 1987
- District abolished: 1996
- First contested: 1988
- Last contested: 1993

Burnaby—Kingsway was a federal electoral district in British Columbia, Canada, that was represented in the House of Commons of Canada from 1988 to 1997. This riding was created in 1987 from parts of Burnaby, North Vancouver—Burnaby and Vancouver Kingsway ridings. It was abolished in 1996 when it was merged into Burnaby—Douglas riding.

For its entire history it was represented by New Democratic Party Member of Parliament (MP) Svend Robinson.

== Members of Parliament ==
Parliament	Years	Member	Party
Riding created from Burnaby, North Vancouver—Burnaby and Vancouver Kingsway
34th	1988–1993	Svend Robinson	New Democratic
35th	1993–1997	Svend Robinson	New Democratic
Riding dissolved into Burnaby—Douglas

== Election results ==
=== 1993 ===
1993 Canadian federal election
Party	Candidate	Votes	%	±%
New Democratic	Svend Robinson	18,273	34.15	–9.07
Liberal	Kwangyul Peck	14,056	26.27	+4.04
Reform	John Carpay	13,389	25.02	+22.35
Progressive Conservative	Adele Haines	5,327	9.96	–20.04
National	Daniel Fontaine	1,493	2.79	–
Libertarian	Carlo Nigro	378	0.71	–0.28
Natural Law	Deborah Rubin	270	0.51	–
Independent	Poldi Meindl	119	0.22	+0.06
Commonwealth of Canada	Mike Milkovich	117	0.22	–
Independent	Byrun F. Tylor	51	0.10	–
Marxist–Leninist	Joseph Theriault	39	0.07	–
Total valid votes		53,512	99.23	
Total rejected ballots		416	0.77	+0.28
Turnout		53,928	66.02	–12.74
Eligible voters		81,683		
New Democratic hold		Swing		–
Source: Elections Canada

1988 Canadian federal election
Party	Candidate	Votes	%	±%
New Democratic	Svend Robinson	25,150	43.22	–
Progressive Conservative	John Bitonti	17,455	30.00	–
Liberal	Samuel Stevens	12,933	22.23	–
Reform	John L. Soanes	1,552	2.67	–
Libertarian	Mark J.T. Lane	575	0.99	–
Green	Sunee Yuuho	231	0.40	–
Independent	David John Bader	203	0.35	–
Independent	Poldi Meindl	93	0.16	–
Total valid votes		58,192	99.51	
Total rejected ballots		286	0.49	–
Turnout		58,478	78.76	–
Eligible voters		74,245		
New Democratic gain		Swing		–
Source: Elections Canada

== See also ==
- List of Canadian electoral districts
- Historical federal electoral districts of Canada
