= Grubel =

Grubel or Grübel is a surname. Notable people with the surname include:

- Herb Grubel (born 1934), Canadian politician
- Markus Grübel (born 1959), German politician
- Melchior Grübel, (1500–1561), Swiss soldier and merchant
- Oswald Grübel (born 1943), German businessman
- Sebastian Grübel (c. 1529–1595), Swiss humanist and schoolmaster

== Other ==
- Grubel–Lloyd index, measures intra-industry trade
