= Barbara Edwards =

Barbara Edwards may refer to:

- Barbara Edwards (meteorologist) (born 1939), English weather presenter on BBC
- Barbara Edwards (model) (born 1960), American 1984 Playboy Playmate of the Year
