= Don Bell (politician) =

Canadian politician (born 1942)

Donald H. Bell

Member of Parliament for North Vancouver
- In office October 4, 2004 – September 7, 2008
- Preceded by: Ted White
- Succeeded by: Andrew Saxton

Personal details
- Born: March 10, 1942 (age 84) New Westminster, British Columbia
- Party: Liberal
- Spouse: divorced
- Profession: public relations director

Donald H. Bell (born March 10, 1942) is a Canadian politician. He is currently serving as a councillor for the City of North Vancouver (November 2011 to present). He previously represented the riding of North Vancouver as Member of Parliament in the House of Commons of Canada from 2004 to 2008 as a member of the Liberal Party of Canada. Before being elected, he was the mayor of the District of North Vancouver.

Born in New Westminster, British Columbia, Bell was first elected as an alderman in the District of North Vancouver in 1970, and again, topping the polls, in 1972 and 1974. He was elected mayor of the District in 1976, 1978, and 1980. He then voluntarily returned to the private sector for 13 years. In 1986 he revived his political career and was elected for three terms as a school trustee in 1986, 1988 and 1990, serving twice as school board chairman. He then returned to District council, being elected as a municipal councillor in 1993. In 1996 he returned full-time to the mayor's chair by acclamation, and was re-elected as mayor in 1999 and 2002.

During the 2004 federal election, and against most pundits' predictions, he federally won the North Vancouver riding for the Liberals in what had been a strong Conservative seat for 30 years. Bell defeated incumbent MP Ted White who had held the seat for the Reform, Alliance and Conservative parties since 1993. Bell was re-elected to office in the 2006 federal election.

Bell served as BC federal Liberal Caucus Chair, and as Chair of the federal Liberal Northern and Western Caucus, covering the four western provinces and the northern territories. He was a member and vice-chair of the federal Standing Committee on Transport, Infrastructure and Communities, and the Liberal opposition critic for the Asia Pacific Gateway.

Bell was defeated in the 2008 election by Conservative Andrew Saxton.

Bell served as Chair of a special City of North Vancouver Civic Engagement Task Force from June 2010 to April 2011.

Since 2011, Bell has served as a city councillor for North Vancouver.

== Private sector ==
Bell was Public Affairs Director for Canada Safeway, based in Vancouver, from 1982 through 1995, when he then returned full-time to local politics as Mayor of the District in 1996.

Following his defeat in the federal election of 2008, he was Product Development Manager for Golden Griffin International Enterprises Inc. from the Fall of 2008 through 2009.

== Electoral record ==
2008 Canadian federal election: North Vancouver
Party	Candidate	Votes	%	±%	Expenditures
Conservative	Andrew Saxton	24,371	42.26	+5.48	$88,449.60
Liberal	Don Bell	21,551	37.37	–4.98	$86,166.72
Green	Jim Stephenson	6,168	10.69	+3.21	$16,920.50
New Democratic	Michael Charrois	5,417	9.39	–3.81	$7,250.53
Libertarian	Tunya Audain	166	0.29	–	none listed
Total valid votes/expense limit		57,673	99.72	–	$89,265.68
Total rejected ballots		162	0.28	+0.05	
Turnout		57,835	66.45	–3.44	
Eligible voters		87,034			
Conservative gain from Liberal		Swing		+5.23	
Source: Elections Canada

2006 Canadian federal election: North Vancouver
Party	Candidate	Votes	%	±%	Expenditures
Liberal	Don Bell	25,357	42.35	+2.32	$78,709.24
Conservative	Cindy Silver	22,021	36.78	+0.41	$82,284.86
New Democratic	Sherry Shaghaghi	7,903	13.20	–2.67	$14,389.31
Green	Jim Stephenson	4,483	7.49	+0.21	$15,613.36
Marxist–Leninist	Michael Hill	112	0.19	+0.05	none listed
Total valid votes/expense limit		59,876	99.77	–	$83,093.96
Total rejected ballots		140	0.23	–0.05	
Turnout		60,016	69.89	+1.72	
Eligible voters		85,876			
Liberal hold		Swing		+0.95	
Source: Elections Canada

2004 Canadian federal election: North Vancouver
Party	Candidate	Votes	%	±%	Expenditures
Liberal	Don Bell	22,619	40.03	+7.48	$66,974.01
Conservative	Ted White	20,548	36.36	–20.75	$58,779.65
New Democratic	John Nelson	8,967	15.87	+10.95	$21,328.35
Green	Peggy Stortz	4,114	7.28	–	$3,241.79
Canadian Action	Andres Esteban Barker	181	0.32	–	$400.25
Marxist–Leninist	Michael Hill	77	0.14	–	none listed
Total valid votes/expense limit		56,506	99.72	–	$79,937.85
Total rejected ballots		158	0.28	–	
Turnout		56,664	68.16	–	
Eligible voters		83,129			
Liberal notional gain from Conservative		Swing		+14.11	
Change is based on redistributed results. Conservative vote is compared to the total of the Canadian Alliance vote and Progressive Conservative vote in 2000 election.
Source: Elections Canada
