= Upper Canada College Board of Stewards =

Official student government of Upper Canada College

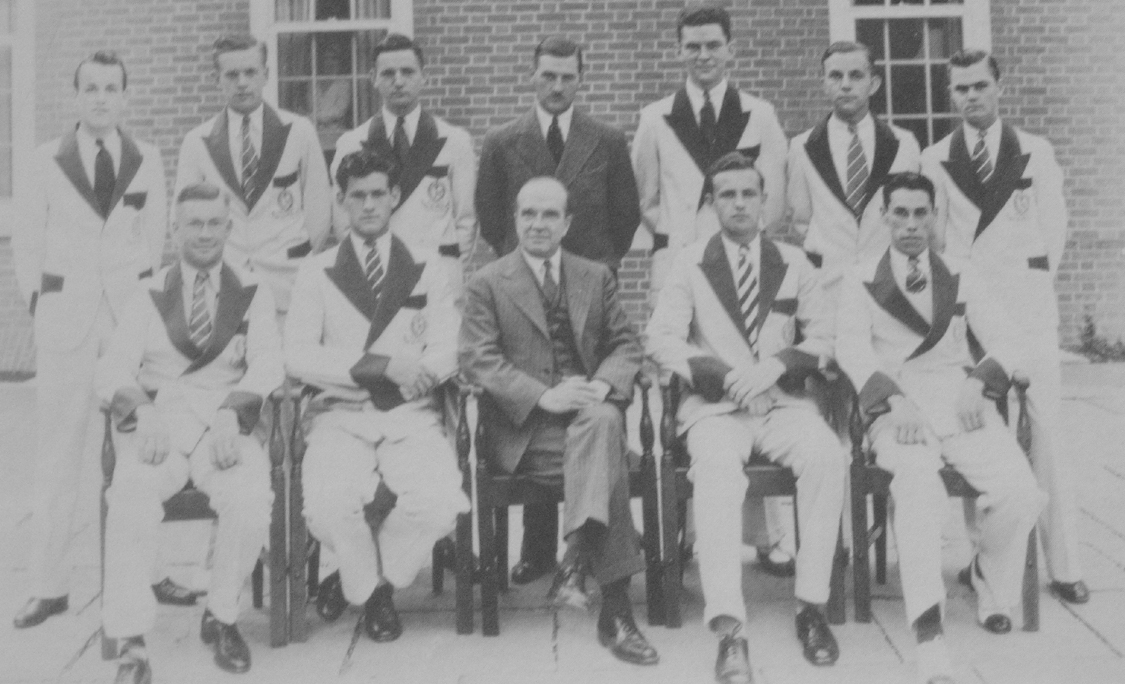
The UCC Board of Stewards, 1933-34, wearing the distinctive Steward's jacket.

The Board of Stewards of Upper Canada College (UCC), a private all-male school in Toronto, Ontario, Canada, serves as the school's official student government. A steward is elected to represent each of the ten houses that make up the College, while a Head Steward and eight Portfolio Stewards (prior to 2023, six Portfolio Stewards) are elected by the entire student body. In 2004, the positions of Secretary and Treasurer were added. In the past, steward positions were not elected by the student body, but from a vote within the Board of Stewards. Currently, each steward is voted in during Year 11 at the college by either the student population or by their house (depending on the position being applied for).The process of electing Stewards takes place every February to April, and new Stewards are instated officially at the start of May before the new school year in September.

Stewards wear distinctive ties, and what is known as the "Steward's Blazer"; unlike the solid navy blue blazer, which forms part of the UCC uniform, the Steward's Blazer is white with navy blue lapels and cuffs. The Portfolio Stewards for the 2025-2026 (196th) school year are: Chris Jagdeo (Head Steward), Laurence Fiorini (Athletic Steward), Hudson Vandermeer (Learning Steward), Alfred Liu (Creativity Steward), Josh Golger (Community Steward), Matthew Tong (Service Steward), Will Rowley (Pluralism Steward), Keon Abbaszadeh (Sustainability Steward), and Derek Gu (Wellbeing Steward). The Heads of Houses for the 2025-2026 school year are: Jack Francis (Orr's HoH), Johnny McGrath (McHugh’s HoH), Christopher Chung (Mowbray's HoH), Patrick Cowling (Martland's HoH), Jack Bratty (Jackson's HoH), Liyang Yin (Seaton's HoH), Daniel Ogunlaja (Wedd's HoH), Ethan Goonaratne (Howard's HoH), Jackson Yip (Scadding's HoH), and Noah Lawrence (Bremner's HoH).

== History ==
The Board of Stewards was instituted in 1892, just one year after the college moved to its new Deer Park campus; and the Stewards' Blazer began its use five years later. The design of the jackets was not without criticism, letters to the editor of the College Times complained that they were "the cynosure of everyone's eye - But so is the uniform of the door man at the Park Plaza."

From time to time, being a member of the board brought some privileges. It was reported by Barstow Miller, Head Boy in 1915, that William "Stony" Jackson, a house master at the time, who also conducted meetings of the Board, would allow prefects a secret place to smoke "around the corner through his hallway". Six members were also designated as student editors of the College Times after 1894. By 1906 they comprised the entire editorial board, a designation that lasted for two years. The Stewards used to be charged with initiating new boys into the Upper School; in 1920 this consisted of putting them through an athletics course, classical dancing, cadet drill, gymnastics, and more - blindfolded. This practice ended in 1944.

That year, the form of the board was restructured by principal Lorne M. McKenzie, on the grounds that not enough intellectual leadership was being provided by the stewards; boys ceased to automatically become a steward because they held a certain office. Prior to this, the board was composed of the three first-team captains of football, hockey and cricket, the senior officer of the Rifle Corps, and the two top students, one boarder (Head of the House) and one day boy (Head of the Town), and into the mid 1920s, four senior Prefects were added, followed by the editor of the College Times. Beyond questionable qualifications, this system also led to the problem that if a boy held more than one office there would be a vacancy on the Board. Letters written to the editor of the College Times complained about this appointment process, and claimed that the stewards' only purpose was to hold the prayer hall in subjugation after the principal and masters had left (which they would do after a call of "Stewards will take charge"). At the beginning of 1946, ten boys were appointed by the principal, regardless of what position they did, or did not hold. Even after this, disorganization of the Board led to the creation of the Head Steward in 1954.

Into the 1970s, the role of the stewards changed from one of authoritarian figures to counsellors for the younger boys. At the members' request, their lockers were moved from a separated location to be amongst those of the school's general population. Stewards also began to criticize the Cadet Corps at UCC, which was eventually disbanded in 1976.

Today, the board consists of ten Heads of House elected by their respective House members, and eight stewards-with-portfolio as well as a Head Steward who are elected by the entire student body. In 2007, the Sustainability Steward was created to help the school with environmental issues and maintain a healthy and sustainable student body. In 2023, the role of Social Steward was restructured into the three distinct roles of Community Steward, Pluralism Steward, and Wellbeing Steward, each of which reflect one of the school’s core values.

== Notable alumni who served as stewards ==
- Michael Ignatieff - Leader of the Liberal Party of Canada and Leader of the Opposition in the House of Commons of Canada, served as Head of Wedd's House.
- Leonard Dick - Emmy Award, Golden Globe and Writer's Guild Award-winning producer and writer, served as Head of Howard's House.
- William Kilbourn - FRSC, Oxford and Harvard graduate, author, historian, executive of Canada Council and Canadian commission for UNESCO, served as Head of Town
- Andrew Saxton - Member of Parliament and Parliamentary Secretary to the President of the Treasury Board, served as Head of Wedd's House.
