= Ron Huntington =

Canadian politician (1921–1998)

The Honourable Arthur Ronald Huntington PC

Member of the Canadian Parliament for Capilano
- In office 1974–1984
- Preceded by: Jack Davis
- Succeeded by: Mary Collins

Personal details
- Born: February 13, 1921 Vancouver, British Columbia
- Died: December 28, 1998 (aged 77)
- Party: Progressive Conservative
- Cabinet: Minister of State for Small Businesses and Industry (1979-1980)

Arthur Ronald Huntington PC (February 13, 1921 – December 28, 1998) was a Canadian politician.

== Early life ==
The son of Sam and Winifred, he was born in Vancouver, British Columbia. Huntington was a member of the Royal Canadian Navy during World War II, rising to the rank of lieutenant commander. He graduated from the University of British Columbia. He served in the Mediterranean and the North Atlantic.

== Political career ==
Huntington first ran for the House of Commons of Canada in 1972 for the riding of Capilano but was defeated. A Progressive Conservative, he was elected in 1974 and was re-elected in 1979 and 1980. He won the seat in the July 1974 elections from Liberal MP Jack Davis, who was the first environment minister. During his time in office, Huntington called for tighter immigration laws, which led to him being called racist against Chinese and East Indians, an allegation he denied. He also served as Chairman of the standing committees on Public Accounts multiple times during his terms. According to Peter MacKay, Huntington wanted to improve the public accountability of the government, and hold public officials to account.

During Joe Clark's brief term as prime minister from 1979 to 1980, he was the Minister of State for Small Businesses and Industry.

He was chairman of the Canada Ports Corporation from 1985 to 1991.

He was married to a woman named Jean, with whom he had two children with called Ron and Vicki, and who died in 1974 of cancer. He remarried in 1990 to Miriam, with whom he lived in White Rock until his death. His daughter Vicki Huntington was a member of the Legislative Assembly of British Columbia.
