= Braeden Caley =

Canadian political strategist and politician

Braeden Caley MP

Member of Parliament for North Vancouver—Capilano
- Incumbent
- Assumed office August 31, 2026
- Preceded by: Jonathan Wilkinson

Deputy Chief of Staff to the Prime Minister
- In office March 14, 2025 – July 12, 2026 Serving with Andrée-Lyne Hallé
- Prime Minister: Mark Carney
- Preceded by: Brian Clow; Marjorie Michel
- Succeeded by: Tim Krupa; Jennifer McIntyre

Personal details
- Born: Richmond, British Columbia, Canada
- Party: Liberal
- Education: University of British Columbia
- Occupation: Political strategist
- Website: braedencaley.liberal.ca

Braeden Caley is a Canadian political strategist and politician who has served as the member of Parliament (MP) for North Vancouver—Capilano since winning a 2026 by-election. A member of the Liberal Party, he previously served as deputy chief of staff to Prime Minister Mark Carney and as president and chief executive officer of the public-policy think tank Canada 2020.

== Early life and education ==
Caley was born and raised in Richmond, British Columbia. He received a Bachelor of Arts in political science from the University of British Columbia and an executive certificate in public policy from the Harvard Kennedy School. In 2016, he was named to BC Business's Top 30 Under 30.

== Political and public-policy career ==
Caley worked in Canadian politics for more than two decades before becoming a candidate himself. Early in his career, he worked in a Member of Parliament's constituency office.

He subsequently served as director of policy and communications for Vancouver mayor Gregor Robertson. In February 2016, he left the mayor's office to become senior director of communications for the Liberal Party of Canada. Caley worked in senior roles on the Liberal campaigns led by Justin Trudeau in the 2015, 2019 and 2021 federal elections.

Caley later joined Canada 2020, a progressive public-policy think tank, becoming its executive director and subsequently its president and chief executive officer. Carney served as chair of the organization's advisory board during part of Caley's tenure.

Caley became closely involved in Carney's entry into federal politics. During the twilight of Trudeau’s leadership, he along side Gerald Butts privately advocated for leadership race instead of allowing the caucus to select the new leader. Caley also helped soft-launched Carney's campaign on the American television program The Daily Show by reaching out to their producers. He served as campaign director for Carney's successful campaign in the 2025 Liberal Party of Canada leadership election and subsequently as a national campaign co-director for the Liberal Party. Following Carney's appointment as prime minister in March 2025, Caley became a deputy chief of staff in the Prime Minister's Office.

== Federal political career ==
In May 2026, it was reported that Caley was considering seeking the Liberal nomination in North Vancouver—Capilano, where a vacancy was expected following the departure of Liberal MP Jonathan Wilkinson. Wilkinson had announced his intention to resign from the House of Commons after being appointed Canada's ambassador to the European Union.

Caley resigned as Carney's deputy chief of staff in July 2026 to seek the Liberal nomination. The Liberal Party announced him as its candidate on July 18. The by-election was held on August 31, 2026.

== Electoral history ==
Canadian federal by-election, August 31, 2026: North Vancouver—Capilano Resignation of Jonathan Wilkinson
Party	Candidate	Votes	%	±%
Liberal	Braeden Caley	23,739	58.73	–1.09
Conservative	Stephen Curran	11,791	29.17	–4.50
Green	Shelley Luce	3,461	8.56	+6.86
New Democratic	Stephen Tweedale	1,242	3.07	–1.17
People's	Ehsan Arjmand	133	0.33	–0.07
Independent	Jeff Monds	51	0.13	—
Total valid votes		40,421		
Total rejected ballots		179		
Turnout		40,654	45.60	-26.05
Eligible voters		89,154		
Liberal hold		Swing		+1.63
Source: Elections Canada
