= Capilano (electoral district) =

Former federal electoral district in British Columbia, Canada

Coordinates: 49.365°N 122.980°W

British Columbia electoral district
- Boundaries at abolition

Defunct federal electoral district
- Legislature: House of Commons
- District created: 1966
- District abolished: 1987
- First contested: 1968
- Last contested: 1984

Capilano was a federal electoral district in British Columbia, Canada, that was represented in the House of Commons of Canada from 1968 to 1988. This riding was created in 1966 from parts of Coast—Capilano riding.

It was abolished in 1987 when it was redistributed into Capilano—Howe Sound and North Vancouver ridings.

== Members of Parliament ==
Capilano
| Parliament | Years | Member | Party |
|---|---|---|---|
Riding created from Coast—Capilano
| 28th | 1968–1972 | Jack Davis | Liberal |
| 29th | 1972–1974 | Jack Davis | Liberal |
| 30th | 1974–1979 | Ron Huntington | Progressive Conservative |
| 31st | 1979–1980 | Ron Huntington | Progressive Conservative |
| 32nd | 1980–1984 | Ron Huntington | Progressive Conservative |
| 33rd | 1984–1988 | Mary Collins | Progressive Conservative |
Riding dissolved into Capilano—Howe Sound and North Vancouver

== History ==
=== Historical boundaries ===
1966 representation order

1976 representation order

== Election results ==
1984 Canadian federal election
| Party | Candidate | Votes | % | ±% |
|---|---|---|---|---|
| Progressive Conservative | Mary Collins | 28,616 | 56.45 | –2.91 |
| Liberal | David Maurice Brousson | 13,575 | 26.78 | +2.33 |
| New Democratic | Larry Whaley | 6,310 | 12.45 | –2.20 |
| Green | Wally Thomas | 747 | 1.47 | – |
| Independent | Barrie Wall | 653 | 1.29 | – |
| Rhinoceros | Richard the Troll Schaller | 603 | 1.19 | –0.36 |
| Libertarian | Bill Tomlinson | 190 | 0.37 | – |
| Total valid votes | | 50,694 | 99.81 | |
| Total rejected ballots | | 99 | 0.19 | +0.01 |
| Turnout | | 50,793 | 83.40 | +8.84 |
| Eligible voters | | 60,902 | | |
| Progressive Conservative hold | | Swing | | –2.62 |
Source: Elections Canada

1980 Canadian federal election
| Party | Candidate | Votes | % | ±% |
|---|---|---|---|---|
| Progressive Conservative | Ron Huntington | 26,327 | 59.36 | –0.05 |
| Liberal | Gerry Salberg | 10,843 | 24.45 | –0.86 |
| New Democratic | Andy J. Krawczyk | 6,495 | 14.64 | +0.09 |
| Rhinoceros | Richard the Troll Schaller | 688 | 1.55 | +0.82 |
| Total valid votes | | 44,353 | 99.81 | |
| Total rejected ballots | | 84 | 0.19 | +0.07 |
| Turnout | | 44,437 | 74.56 | –6.70 |
| Eligible voters | | 59,600 | | |
| Progressive Conservative hold | | Swing | | +0.40 |
Source: Elections Canada

1979 Canadian federal election
| Party | Candidate | Votes | % | ±% |
|---|---|---|---|---|
| Progressive Conservative | Ron Huntington | 27,099 | 59.41 | +10.49 |
| Liberal | Dave Finlay | 11,542 | 25.30 | –15.25 |
| New Democratic | Michael Karton | 6,639 | 14.56 | +4.50 |
| Rhinoceros | Richard the Troll Schaller | 332 | 0.73 | – |
| Total valid votes | | 45,612 | 99.88 | |
| Total rejected ballots | | 55 | 0.12 | –0.08 |
| Turnout | | 45,667 | 81.26 | +1.79 |
| Eligible voters | | 56,199 | | |
| Progressive Conservative hold | | Swing | | +12.87 |
Source: Elections Canada

1974 Canadian federal election
| Party | Candidate | Votes | % | ±% |
|---|---|---|---|---|
| Progressive Conservative | Ron Huntington | 25,797 | 48.92 | +14.29 |
| Liberal | Jack Davis | 21,387 | 40.56 | –6.89 |
| New Democratic | L.C. Minch Minchin | 5,303 | 10.06 | –6.86 |
| Independent | Scott Richardson | 136 | 0.26 | – |
| Marxist–Leninist | Bill Shpikula | 108 | 0.20 | – |
| Total valid votes | | 52,731 | 99.80 | |
| Total rejected ballots | | 107 | 0.20 | –0.15 |
| Turnout | | 52,838 | 79.47 | –0.66 |
| Eligible voters | | 66,491 | | |
| Progressive Conservative gain from Liberal | | Swing | | +10.59 |
Source: Library of Parliament

1972 Canadian federal election
| Party | Candidate | Votes | % | ±% |
|---|---|---|---|---|
| Liberal | Jack Davis | 24,489 | 47.45 | –18.92 |
| Progressive Conservative | Ron Huntington | 17,873 | 34.63 | +17.48 |
| New Democratic | Jim McKenzie | 8,731 | 16.92 | +2.19 |
| Social Credit | Thor Kristensen | 517 | 1.00 | –0.75 |
| Total valid votes | | 51,610 | 99.65 | |
| Total rejected ballots | | 180 | 0.35 | –0.02 |
| Turnout | | 51,790 | 80.13 | +1.28 |
| Eligible voters | | 64,635 | | |
| Liberal hold | | Swing | | –18.20 |
Source: Library of Parliament

1968 Canadian federal election
| Party | Candidate | Votes | % |
|---|---|---|---|
| Liberal | Jack Davis | 28,292 | 66.37 |
| Progressive Conservative | Carlyle Boyd Shannon | 7,310 | 17.15 |
| New Democratic | Frank Snowsell | 6,279 | 14.73 |
| Social Credit | Lance Jack Mackie | 745 | 1.75 |
| Total valid votes | | 42,626 | 99.64 |
| Total rejected ballots | | 156 | 0.36 |
| Turnout | | 42,782 | 78.85 |
| Eligible voters | | 54,260 | |
| Liberal pickup new district. | | | |
This riding was created from parts of Coast—Capilano, where Liberal Jack Davis was the incumbent.
Source: Library of Parliament

== See also ==
- List of Canadian electoral districts
- Historical federal electoral districts of Canada
