= Melchior Grübel =

Swiss merchant and conquistador in Venezuela

- Born: c. 1500; St. Gallen, Old Swiss Confederacy
- Died: c. 1561; Venezuela
- Occupations: Merchant, conquistador, colonial administrator
- Spouse: Katharina von Vonbühl (divorced 1552)
- Children: Leonhard (natural son), Beatriz, and two others

Melchior Grübel (c. 1500 – c. 1561) was a Swiss mercenary, merchant, and conquistador from St. Gallen who became a prominent figure in the early colonial administration of Venezuela. He served as a representative of the Welser banking house and later became a colonial governor, playing a significant role in the founding of several Venezuelan cities during the 16th century.

== Early life and family ==
Melchior Grübel was born around 1500 in St. Gallen into a prosperous merchant family. His father, Stephan Grübel, operated a trading company with family members and held high offices in the city. In 1445, his father and uncle Hans Grübel received a coat of arms from Emperor Frederick III. The family was related to the humanist Sebastian Grübel from Schaffhausen.

Details of Grübel's childhood and youth remain unknown. He later became a textile merchant and member of the Notenstein Society. He owned a residence on Spisergasse and married Katharina von Vonbühl (also known as Katharina Vonwiller), with whom he likely had four children. The couple divorced in 1552.

== Military service and early career ==
In 1531, Grübel participated in the Second War of Kappel as a member of St. Gallen's War Council. Three years later, in 1534, city authorities granted him permission to serve as a mercenary for Baron Georg von Hewen under the foreign service system. However, he chose instead to travel to the Caribbean, likely on behalf of the Welser banking house, a patrician family from Augsburg in southern Germany.

== Venezuelan ventures ==
=== Welser representative ===
By 1535, Grübel had arrived in Venezuela in the colony of Klein-Venedig ("Little Venice"), which had been pledged to the Welser family as collateral. He was probably accompanied by his natural son Leonhard. In the colony, he served as a full representative (factor) of a Welser trading post and represented the company in legal proceedings. Grübel was acquainted with Hieronymus Sailer, who may have provided him with the necessary contacts and who had concluded agreements with Emperor Charles V on behalf of the Welser in 1528.

As a conquistador, Grübel participated in expeditions into the interior of the territory. In 1541, he sent money to family members who had remained in St. Gallen for the last time. No further contact with his hometown is documented after this date.

=== Colonial administrator ===
In 1545, Grübel was involved in the founding of the city of El Tocuyo. By 1546 at the latest, he had separated from the Welser company and entered the service of the new colonial vice-governor Juan de Carvajal, a former Spanish Welser trading post manager. This change may have been related to legal proceedings against the Welser company. Following repeated complaints about the brutal exploitation of the indigenous peoples and Spanish colonists by the Welser, the company lost its concession over Klein-Venedig in 1546. Carvajal executed the two Welser representatives in the territory.

As a member of Venezuela's colonial economic elite, Grübel became co-founder of the city of Nueva Segovia de Barquisimeto in 1552. He served as governor of Santa Ana de Coro (Neu-Augsburg), El Tocuyo, and Borburata from 1545 to 1554. In the late 1540s, he had another daughter, probably named Beatriz. His son Leonhard married Maria Arias de Valdes, daughter of vice-governor Alonso Arias de Villasinda.

During the 1550s, Grübel and his son owned six encomiendas in El Tocuyo. These grants allowed them to collect tribute and exploit the indigenous population through forced labor. Grübel, who probably served as vice-governor for several months in 1559, transitioned from conquistador to colonial occupier. He died around 1561 in Venezuela.

== Bibliography ==
- Avellan De Tamayo, Nieves: La Nueva Segovia de Bariquiçimeto, 2 vol., 1992.
- Avellan De Tamayo, Nieves: En la ciudad de El Tocuyo. 1545-1600, 2 vol., 1997.
- Denzer, Jörg: Die Konquista der Augsburger Welser-Gesellschaft in Südamerika (1528-1556). Historische Rekonstruktion, Historiografie und lokale Erinnerungskultur in Kolumbien und Venezuela, 2005.
- Krauer, Rezia; Stadelmann, Nicole et al. (ed.): Konquistadoren und Sklavenhändler vom Bodensee. Kolonialgeschichte im 16. Jahrhundert, 2024.
- Simmer, Götz: Gold und Sklaven. Die Provinz Venezuela während der Welser-Verwaltung (1528-1556), 2000.
