= Warren Kinsella =

Canadian political adviser and commentator (born 1960)

Warren James Kinsella
- Born: August 1960 (age 66); Montreal, Quebec, Canada
- Education: University of Calgary; Carleton University
- Spouses: Suzanne Amos (divorced); Lisa Kirbie (separated, 2019)
- Relatives: Douglas Kinsella (father)
- Website: warrenkinsella.com

Warren James Kinsella (born August 1960) is a Canadian lawyer, author, musician, political consultant, and commentator. Kinsella has written commentary in many of Canada's major newspapers and several magazines, including the Globe and Mail, the Toronto Sun, Ottawa Citizen, the National Post, The Walrus, and Postmedia newspapers. He appeared regularly on the Sun News Network. Kinsella is the founder of the Daisy Consulting Group, a Toronto-based firm that engages in political campaign strategy work, lobbying and communications crisis management.

== Early life and education ==
Kinsella attended Carleton University from 1980 to 1984, earning a Bachelor of Journalism.

== Career ==
In the 1980s, Kinsella was a reporter at the Calgary Herald and later the Ottawa Citizen.

Later, as a lawyer, Kinsella was a partner in the law firm McMillan Binch. He left the legal firm in 2002 and co-founded the consulting firm, Navigator. In 2006, he left to found his own agency, Daisy Consulting Group, a Toronto-based firm that engages in paid political advertising, lobbying and communications crisis management.

=== Politics ===
==== Federal politics ====
===== Liberal Party =====
Kinsella served as a media adviser to opposition leader Jean Chrétien's office and as a strategist in the Canadian federal Liberal Party's 1993 election campaign "task force". After the Liberals won the election, Kinsella became chief of staff to federal Public Works minister David Dingwall. Lawrence Martin noted in his book Iron Man that Kinsella was accused by Peter Donolo, Chrétien's communications director, of being overtly aggressive and seeing enemies everywhere. In addition, Martin noted that many Liberal MPs expressed concern about Kinsella's behaviour. However, Kinsella was a favourite of Aline Chrétien, the Prime Minister's wife, which meant that the complaints were ignored.

Kinsella ran as a Liberal candidate in the 1997 federal election in the riding of North Vancouver but was defeated by Reform incumbent Ted White.

During his last stint as a national campaign headquarters worker during the 2000 Canadian federal election, he appeared on CTV's Canada AM brandishing a purple Barney dinosaur doll to mock what he claimed were Canadian Alliance leader Stockwell Day's creationist beliefs. Public affairs consultant Robin Sears in Policy Options used this incident to compare him to American political consultant James Carville and argued that "The Carvillites and their young fans were less concerned with the substance of politics or its impact on citizens' building contempt for politics than with their personal scores."

After the 2000 federal election, Kinsella was a vocal supporter of Chrétien during the intra-party struggle that resulted in Chrétien being replaced by Paul Martin. In Iron Man, Lawrence Martin noted that Kinsella saw Paul Martin and his followers "as almost much an enemy" as the opposition parties, and favored working against the Martin faction. He would work on Liberal leadership campaigns for Allan Rock and Sheila Copps in opposition to Martin. He later admitted to quitting the Liberal Party when then-cabinet minister Herb Dhaliwal had his Vancouver South-Burnaby riding association taken over by the Martin forces in November 2002.

Starting in November 2008, Kinsella worked briefly for Liberal leadership candidate Michael Ignatieff. One long-time senior Liberal questioned the hiring of Kinsella, calling him a "human shrapnel machine." Later that month Kinsella apologized for a post in his video blog that jokingly mentioned that his regular Chinese restaurant sold "cat meat." Kinsella resigned from Ignatieff's campaign in May 2009, citing treatment of fired colleagues.

Kinsella publicly considered seeking the Liberal nomination for the 2015 federal election in Toronto—Danforth, but ultimately demurred in the belief that he would not be approved as a nominee. He argued that Justin Trudeau's inner circle had played a role in the ouster of Jean Chretien as Prime Minister. He has been a critic of Trudeau's leadership. During the 2019 election, Kinsella sent tweets accusing the Prime Minister of buying drinks for Faith Goldy, making false accusations of a suppressed The Globe & Mail story, and linking to a fake website that advocated Chrystia Freeland as leader of the Liberal Party. After the election, Kinsella praised Trudeau by stating that since the election there had been "no stunts, no selfies, no over-saturation".

===== Gomery inquiry =====
During the Gomery Commission's inquiry into the Sponsorship scandal, Justice John Gomery was told that Kinsella, while chief of staff to Minister of Public Works David Dingwall, wrote a letter to the department's Deputy Minister, Ran Quail in 1994 requesting Chuck Guité be appointed to review the government's advertising and communications strategy. Quail said he viewed the letter as political interference into civil service affairs, while Dingwall and Kinsella characterized the letter as a request rather than a directive. No finding of any fault was found in Gomery's report relating to Kinsella's conduct.

===== Green Party =====
Kinsella worked for the Green Party of Canada during July 2019 in the run-up to the 2019 Canadian federal election. This work was a temporary arrangement and involved "Kinsella setting up a quick-response unit for the Greens."

===== Conservative Party of Canada =====
In October 2019, the Globe and Mail reported that Kinsella's consulting firm, Daisy Group, had, according to an anonymous source, been hired by the Conservative Party of Canada to create a campaign attempting to discredit Maxime Bernier and the People's Party of Canada. Neither the Conservative Party nor Kinsella would confirm or deny that they had been working together. Bernier filed a complaint to the Commissioner of Canada Elections. On October 19, 2019, Kinsella deactivated his Twitter and Facebook accounts and posted a statement on his website that he is "pulling back from (social) media." On October 22, Kinsella called on the Commissioner of Canada Elections to investigate the role that his own firm played.

On 29 October 2019 Kinsella said on his podcast that he would not reveal who had hired his company, maintaining that it was protected by solicitor-client privilege, but stated the campaign should have been disclosed earlier. On November 2, Kory Teneycke cited Andrew Scheer's handling of the Kinsella story as one reason for questioning Scheer's future as the leader of the Conservative Party. While, CBC revealed, on November 26, 2019, a recording describing Kinsella's contempt of Bernier and identified that Conservative campaign manager Hamish Marshall and co-chair, John Walsh knew about the campaign and were watching. Kinsella is heard telling the staff that they need to "draw blood". After filing a $1 million lawsuit, Kinsella later settled out of court with the source; who was a former Daisy Employee, Aziza Mohammed. On December 8 the Globe and Mail reported that it was a lack of clarity "what other activities were part of the project" and that "The Conservative Party will eventually have to report all of its spending and third-party contracts to Elections Canada". While, Kinsella and his firm did not break the Elections Canada Act (which only governs spending), CBC News suggested that story might not end.

In February 2020, Bernier launched a lawsuit against Kinsella alleging defamation by branding Bernier a racist, in relation to the 2019 election. The lawsuit sought an admission of defamation and $325,000 in damages. In November 2021, the court dismissed the lawsuit, based on Ontario's Anti-SLAPP legislation, determining that it was not proven that the defamation concerns outweighed the importance of protecting free speech. Bernier was ordered in February 2022 to pay $132,000 in legal costs to Kinsella.

=== Provincial politics ===
==== Ontario Liberals ====
Kinsella was a long time supporter of Ontario premier Dalton McGuinty, and was a fixture in Ontario Liberal Party election campaigns while McGuinty was leader. The Hill Times stated that Kinsella was the individual that branded Ontario Progressive Conservatives Leader John Tory's promise to publicly fund faith-based schools during the 2007 election "into a Canadian version of Nixon's racist Southern strategy". He would apologize for a blog post during the campaign suggesting that Progressive Conservative MPP Lisa MacLeod would rather bake cookies than be seen with farm activist Randy Hillier; MacLeod would later use the remark as the humorous title for a cookbook.

Kinsella supported Sandra Pupatello in the 2013 Liberal Party of Ontario leadership convention that chose a successor to McGuinty. The leadership was won by Kathleen Wynne. Kinsella was sharply critical of Wynne's campaign during the 2014 Ontario election, and subsequently.

==== Ontario Progressive Conservatives ====
On October 31, 2019, the Globe and Mail reported that a spokesperson for Autistics for Autistics (A4A), an Ontario Autism advocacy group, threatened litigation against Kinsella after warning Kinsella's Daisy firm over a suspected connection between free media training provided by his firm and the Ontario government led by premier Doug Ford. Kinsella stated that his work was unrelated with strategic advice and media training provided to Minister of Children, Community and Social Services Lisa MacLeod and her political staff in March 2018 over the restrictions to the provincial autism program. While House leader Paul Calandra, who was asked by reporters if he would release the contract, stated that Daisy' firm services was for social assistance not autism

==== Municipal politics ====
Kinsella advised John Tory in the 2003 Toronto mayoral election.

In 2014 mayoral election, Kinsella assisted Olivia Chow's campaign. On August 20, 2014, Kinsella tweeted "Is John Tory's SmartTrack, you know, Segregationist Track?", and posted a photo featuring Tory and an edited speech bubble stating that Jane/Finch and Rexdale were intentionally excluded from the plan. Kinsella apologized for the incident. Daisy Consulting later announced that they had fired Chow as a client due to remarks regarding Kinsella. After a Twitter showdown between Tory's strategist Nick Kouvalis; Kinsella sued Kouvalis for $100,000 libel suit over tweets that Kinsella alleges were slanderous. Kouvalis was later reported by the Toronto Star as the person responsible for bringing Kinsella as an advisor to John Tory during the 2018 Toronto mayoral election.

On November 16, 2018 the OPP charged Mark Grimes along with outgoing city councillor Justin Di Ciano for allegedly filing false campaign expenses for the 2014 municipal elections, contrary to the Municipal Elections Act. In order to fight the allegations, then-councillor Di Ciano and Grimes hired the firm of strategist Kinsella to compile a "research" dossier on him and political foes such as CBC News. A few months later, Grimes faced litigation by Kinsella for allegedly failing to pay invoices for services rendered by Kinsella's Daisy Group.

In 2026, Kinsella served as a senior adviser to Brad Bradford's campaign in the 2026 Toronto mayoral election. By September 21, he was no longer listed among the campaign's senior staff. Campaign communications director Laryssa Waler said Kinsella had told the campaign months earlier that he would be busy with a book tour and international travel. Kinsella continued to post in support of Bradford. On September 2, during a severe storm, Kinsella posted: "The sun is out and it's lovely in Toronto. Good thing Olivia Chow practically declared a state of emergency..." Bradford later called the post "pretty stupid" and said Kinsella was speaking from his personal account, not for the campaign.

==== Writing ====
In 1997, Kinsella published the novel Party Favours, a thinly veiled roman à clef about the Chrétien government similar to the 1996 American novel Primary Colors. The novel was initially credited to "Jean Doe", with Kinsella only later revealing himself as the real author.

Maclean's associated Kinsella with dirty politics because "His political books are thick with tales of dirty tricks and nasty business in Ottawa's corridors of power, and he is an admitted and most gleeful practitioner of both."

Kinsella runs a blog where he carries out on-and-off feuds with other bloggers, including one with columnist Ezra Levant that prompted Kinsella to initiate a defamation suit claiming $5,000,000 in damages.

In March 2019, Kinsella started as a Toronto Sun columnist. After, it was revealed Kinsella's consulting firm worked with the Conservative Party. Canadaland reported that Sun management did not respond to questions about whether they were aware of Kinsella doing paid work on behalf of the Conservatives, but a spokesperson for parent company Postmedia stated in an email that "Postmedia is unaware of any financial arrangement that Warren Kinsella might have had with a political party while writing a column for the Toronto Sun. If we had been aware of such an arrangement, we would have disclosed that relationship, as is our standard practice."

==== Works ====
Kinsella has written books on Canadian politics, far-right movements and punk music, as well as a series of young adult novels.

- Unholy Alliances: Terrorists, Extremists, Front Companies, and the Libyan Connection in Canada (Lester, 1992), ISBN 978-1-895555-24-0.
- Web of Hate: Inside Canada's Far Right Network (HarperCollins, 1994; revised 2001), ISBN 0-00-638051-4. An examination of far-right organizations in Canada, including the Ku Klux Klan, the Church of the Creator and Aryan Nations.
- Party Favours (HarperCollins, 1997), ISBN 0-00-224562-0, roman à clef written under the pen name "Jean Doe".
- Kicking Ass in Canadian Politics (Random House, 2001), ISBN 978-0-679-31085-3. A book about political campaigning, based on the author's experience in Canadian politics.
- Fury's Hour: A (Sort-of) Punk-Rock Manifesto (Random House, 2005). A book about punk rock history and culture.
- The War Room: Political Strategies for Business, NGOs, and Anyone Who Wants to Win (Dundurn, 2007), ISBN 978-1-55002-746-4.
- Fight the Right: A Manual for Surviving the Coming Conservative Apocalypse (Random House, 2012), ISBN 978-0-307-36165-3.
- Recipe for Hate: The X Gang (Dundurn, 2017), ISBN 978-1-4597-3906-2. A young adult novel about a punk rock group whose members become involved in a murder investigation. The first book in the X Gang series.
- New Dark Ages: The X Gang (Dundurn, 2018), ISBN 978-1-4597-4217-8. The second novel in the X Gang series.
- Age of Unreason: The X Gang (Dundurn, 2019), ISBN 978-1-4597-4218-5. The third novel in the X Gang series.
- The Hidden Hand: The Information War and the Rise of Antisemitic Propaganda (Penguin Random House Canada, 2026), ISBN 978-0-7710-2163-3. Examines antisemitic propaganda and argues that organized disinformation campaigns have contributed to hostility toward Israel and Jews.

== Literary awards ==
The Hidden Hand

- Canadian Jewish Literary Award for Contemporary Jewish Issues - Winner 2026

Recipe for Hate: The X Gang

- Best Books for Kids & Teens, Spring 2018 Winner 2018
- John Spray Mystery Award Short-listed 2018
- White Pine Short-listed 2019

== Electoral record ==
1997 Canadian federal election: North Vancouver
Party	Candidate	Votes	%	±%	Expenditures
Reform	Ted White	27,075	48.86	+8.44	$63,443
Liberal	Warren Kinsella	18,806	33.94	+2.02	$62,704
New Democratic	Martin Stuible	5,075	9.16	+3.47	$11,938
Progressive Conservative	Dennis Prouse	2,740	4.95	–10.61	$14,159
Green	Peggy Stortz	982	1.77	–	$173
Independent	Dallas Collis	365	0.66	–	none listed
Canadian Action	Wayne Mulherin	203	0.37	–	$1,359
Natural Law	Ken Chawkin	162	0.29	–	none listed
Total valid votes		55,408	99.70		
Total rejected ballots		167	0.30	–	
Turnout		55,575	71.83	–	
Eligible voters		77,366			
Reform hold		Swing		+3.21	
Source: Elections Canada
