= Jonathan Wilkinson =

Canadian politician (born 1965)

The Honourable Jonathan Wilkinson PC
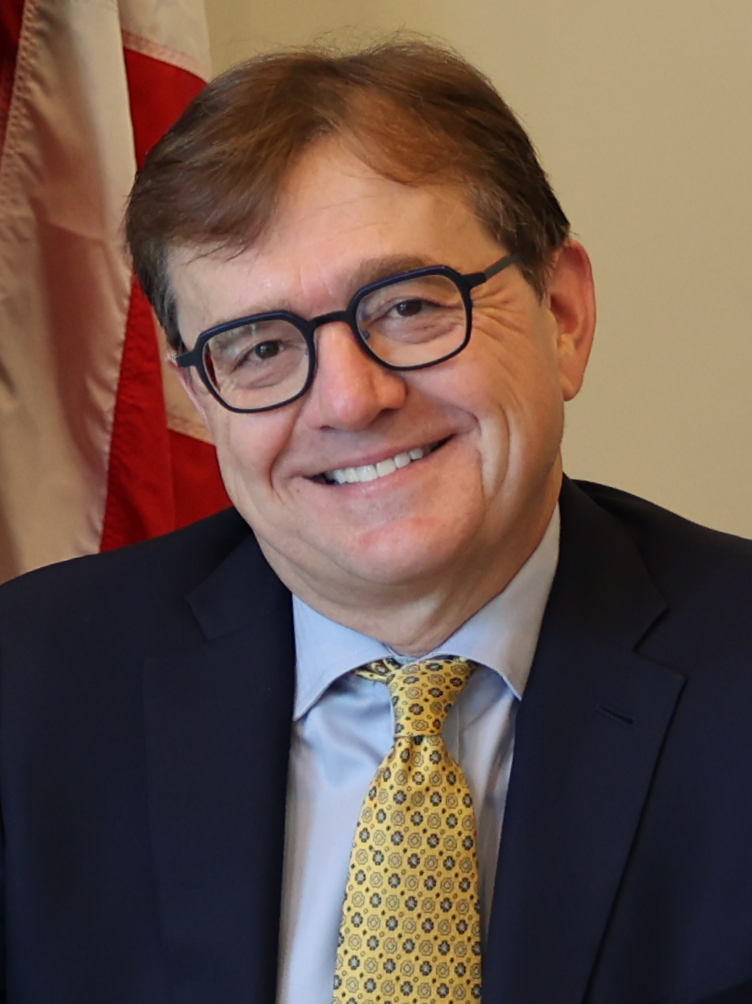
- Wilkinson in 2023

Canadian Ambassador to the European Union
- Incumbent
- Assumed office June 22, 2026
- Prime Minister: Mark Carney
- Preceded by: Ailish Campbell (2025)
Ministerial positions
Minister of Energy and Natural Resources
In office October 26, 2021 – May 13, 2025
Prime Minister	Justin Trudeau; Mark Carney
Preceded by	Seamus O'Regan
Succeeded by	Tim Hodgson
Minister of Environment and Climate Change
In office November 20, 2019 – October 26, 2021
Prime Minister	Justin Trudeau
Preceded by	Catherine McKenna
Succeeded by	Steven Guilbeault
Minister of Fisheries, Oceans and the Canadian Coast Guard
In office July 18, 2018 – November 20, 2019
Prime Minister	Justin Trudeau
Preceded by	Dominic LeBlanc
Succeeded by	Bernadette Jordan

Parliamentary Secretary to the Minister of Environment and Climate Change
- In office December 2, 2015 – July 17, 2018
- Minister: Catherine McKenna
- Preceded by: Dean Del Mastro
- Succeeded by: Sean Fraser

Member of Parliament for North Vancouver—Capilano North Vancouver (2015–2025)
- In office October 19, 2015 – June 19, 2026
- Preceded by: Andrew Saxton
- Succeeded by: Braeden Caley

Personal details
- Born: Jonathan D. Wilkinson; June 11, 1965 (age 61) Sault Ste. Marie, Ontario, Canada
- Party: Liberal
- Other political affiliations: New Democratic (formerly)
- Education: University of Saskatchewan (B.A.); University of Oxford, McGill University (M.A)
- Profession: Politician, businessman

Jonathan D. Wilkinson PC (born June 11, 1965) is a Canadian diplomat, politician, and businessman who is the Canadian ambassador to the European Union since 2026. As a member of the Liberal Party, he served as a member of Parliament (MP) representing North Vancouver—Capilano in the House of Commons from 2015 until resigning in 2026 to take up his diplomatic post.

Wilkinson previously served as Minister of Fisheries, Oceans, and the Canadian Coast Guard from 2018 to 2019, Minister of Environment and Climate Change from 2019 to 2021 and Minister of Energy and Natural Resources from 2021 to 2025.

Before entering federal politics, Wilkinson worked as a civil servant and businessman, spending 20 years in the private sector, primarily with clean technology companies.

== Early life and education ==
Wilkinson was born in Sault Ste. Marie, Ontario, and grew up in Saskatoon. He was the former leader of the New Democratic Party's youth wing in Saskatchewan.

Wilkinson earned a Bachelor of Arts from the University of Saskatchewan in 1988 and was named the Prairies Rhodes Scholar the same year. He earned master's degrees in international relations, politics, and economics from the University of Oxford and McGill University.

== Career prior to politics ==
Wilkinson was an advisor to Saskatchewan premier Roy Romanow and served in the provincial civil service from 1991 to 1995. His work included a role as part of the Charlottetown Accord negotiations.

In 1995 Wilkinson joined the consulting firm Bain & Company at their Toronto branch. In 1999, he relocated to Vancouver to become the chief operating officer at QuestAir Technologies, a gas purification company. He was appointed President and chief executive officer in 2002.

In 2009, he became the senior vice-president for business development in Nexterra Systems, a biomass company. In 2011, Wilkinson became the chief executive officer of BQE Waters (formerly BioteQ Environmental Technologies) a water treatment company based in Vancouver.

== Political career ==
=== Member of Parliament (2015–2026) ===
Wilkinson re-entered politics as a member of the Liberal Party, securing the nomination for the riding of North Vancouver—Capilano. In the 2015 federal election he defeated incumbent Conservative Party candidate Andrew Saxton, receiving 56.7% of the vote. His victory came amidst a broader surge of Liberal support in Greater Vancouver during the 2015 federal election.

Wilkinson was re-elected in the 2019 federal election, where he again faced Conservative Party candidate Andrew Saxton. He received 42.9% of the vote, a reduced vote compared to the 2015 federal election.

In the 2021 Canadian federal election, Wilkinson was again re-elected, receiving 45.1% of the vote, a slight increase from his 2019 result.

Wilkinson was re-elected for a fourth term in the 2025 Canadian federal election. He received 59.8% of the vote, his highest result to date.

Wilkinson was first appointed to the federal cabinet on July 18, 2018, as Minister of Fisheries, Oceans, and the Canadian Coast Guard. Prior to this, he had served as Parliamentary Secretary to the Minister of Environment and Climate Change, Catherine McKenna.

On November 20, 2019, he was appointed Minister of Environment and Climate Change. In 2020, he released Canada's plan to meet its 2030 emissions reduction targets, titled "A Healthy Environment and a Healthy Economy."

On October 26, 2021, Wilkinson was shuffled to the role of Minister of Natural Resources, succeeding Seamus O'Regan. His title was amended on July 26, 2023, when he became Minister of Energy and Natural Resources. Wilkinson retained this role in the first cabinet of Mark Carney.

As an MP, Wilkinson has been active in supporting the Iranian-Canadian community. During the 2022–2023 Iranian protests following the death of Mahsa Amini, Wilkinson joined several Canadian MPs in publicly sponsoring political prisoners detained by the Iranian government. Among those he sponsored were Dr. Hamid Ghare-Hassanlou and his wife Farzaneh Ghare-Hassanlou, Mohammad Rakhshani, and rapper Toomaj Salehi. Wilkinson stated that political sponsorship aims to increase international scrutiny and pressure for the release of individuals facing imprisonment or capital punishment in Iran.

In January 2025, Wilkinson announced he was considering running in the 2025 Liberal Party of Canada leadership election upon the resignation of Prime Minister Justin Trudeau. However, he decided not to run, citing the importance of continuing his role as Minister of Energy and Natural Resources. He subsequently supported Mark Carney.

In May 2026, Wilkinson announced his intention to step down as a member of Parliament to become Canada's ambassador to the European Union. His resignation was effective June 19, 2026.

=== Ambassador to the European Union (2026–present) ===
In April 2026, Wilkinson was appointed as Canada’s Ambassador to the European Union, with the appointment taking effect in the summer of 2026 following his departure from Parliament.

== Electoral history ==
2025 Canadian federal election: North Vancouver—Capilano
Party	Candidate	Votes	%	±%	Expenditures
Liberal	Jonathan Wilkinson	37,907	59.82	+15.13	$127,665.30
Conservative	Stephen Curran	21,339	33.68	+4.30	$108,928.99
New Democratic	Tammy Bentz	2,684	4.24	–14.82	$37,474.25
Green	Andrew Robinson	1,076	1.70	–2.57	$20,398.54
People's	Ehsan Arjmand	256	0.40	–2.17	$660.53
Independent	Oliver King	102	0.16	–	none listed
Total valid votes/expense limit		63,364	99.39	–	$133,984.48
Total rejected ballots		390	0.61	–0.03	
Turnout		63,754	71.65	+6.98	
Eligible voters		88,977			
Liberal hold		Swing		+5.42	
Source: Elections Canada

2021 Canadian federal election: North Vancouver
Party	Candidate	Votes	%	±%	Expenditures
Liberal	Jonathan Wilkinson	26,756	45.10	+2.23	$99,115.36
Conservative	Leslie (Les) Jickling	16,671	28.10	+1.24	$103,363.29
New Democratic	Tammy Bentz	11,750	19.81	+3.38	$20,351.82
Green	Archie Kaario	2,598	4.38	–8.12	$11,600.97
People's	John Galloway	1,545	2.60	+1.28	none listed
Total valid votes/expense limit		59,320	99.36	–	$118,692.36
Total rejected ballots		383	0.64	+0.09	
Turnout		59,703	66.02	–5.18	
Eligible voters		90,437			
Liberal hold		Swing		+0.50	
Source: Elections Canada

2019 Canadian federal election: North Vancouver
Party	Candidate	Votes	%	±%	Expenditures
Liberal	Jonathan Wilkinson	26,979	42.87	–13.78	$100,896.06
Conservative	Andrew Saxton	16,908	26.87	–0.02	$100,554.62
New Democratic	Justine Bell	10,340	16.43	+8.64	$40,432.72
Green	George Orr	7,868	12.50	+4.19	$39,810.86
People's	Azmairnin Jadavji	835	1.33	–	$33,414.76
Total valid votes/expense limit		62,930	99.45	–	$113,732.18
Total rejected ballots		349	0.55	+0.21	
Turnout		63,279	71.20	–4.57	
Eligible voters		88,874			
Liberal hold		Swing		–6.88	
Source: Elections Canada

2015 Canadian federal election: North Vancouver
Party	Candidate	Votes	%	±%	Expenditures
Liberal	Jonathan Wilkinson	36,458	56.65	+26.94	$148,944.98
Conservative	Andrew Saxton	17,301	26.88	–20.67	$149,776.24
Green	Claire Martin	5,350	8.31	+3.08	$134,934.59
New Democratic	Carleen Thomas	5,015	7.79	–9.07	$21,413.99
Libertarian	Ismet Yetisen	136	0.21	–	$22.40
Independent	Payam Azad	94	0.15	–	$1,942.47
Total valid votes/expense limit		64,354	99.66	–	$220,823.27
Total rejected ballots		218	0.34		
Turnout		64,572	75.77		
Eligible voters		85,219			
Liberal gain from Conservative		Swing		+23.80	
Source: Elections Canada

29th Canadian Ministry (2015–2025) – Cabinet of Justin Trudeau
Cabinet posts (3)
Predecessor	Office	Successor
Seamus O'Regan	Minister of Natural Resources; October 26, 2021 – May 13, 2025	Tim Hodgson
Catherine McKenna	Minister of Environment and Climate Change; November 20, 2019 – October 26, 2021	Steven Guilbeault
Dominic LeBlanc	Minister of Fisheries, Oceans and the Canadian Coast Guard; July 17, 2018 – November 20, 2019	Bernadette Jordan
