= Mobina Jaffer =

Canadian lawyer and politician

The Honourable Mobina Jaffer KC
- মবিনা জাফর

Canadian Senator from British Columbia
- In office June 13, 2001 – August 20, 2024
- Nominated by: Jean Chrétien
- Appointed by: Adrienne Clarkson

Personal details
- Born: August 20, 1949 (age 77) Kampala, Uganda
- Party: Independent Senators Group
- Other political affiliations: Independent (2018–2019); Senate Liberal Caucus (2014–2018); Liberal (until 2014)
- Profession: lawyer
- Website: sen.parl.gc.ca/mjaffer/

Mobina S. B. Jaffer KC (Bengali: মবিনা জাফরী) (born August 20, 1949) is a former Canadian Senator representing British Columbia. Jaffer was the first Muslim to be appointed to the upper house as well as being the first senator who was born in Africa, and the first of South Asian descent. She retired on August 20, 2024 upon reaching the mandatory retirement age of 75.

== Early life and career ==
Jaffer was born to a family of Nizari Khojas living in Uganda. Her father had been a member of the Parliament of Uganda and fled in June 1972, joining the rest of the family in England, after a senior military officer warned him that he was to be killed. In August, Idi Amin expelled the Asian population making the entire Jaffer family refugees. The family decide to seek refuge in Canada.

Jaffer is a past member of the Girl Guides of Canada who held many volunteer roles including as a Brownie, Guide, and Pathfinder Leader, and as an elected Commissioner.

In 2014, Jaffer was one of the recipients of the Top 25 Canadian Immigrant Awards presented by Canadian Immigrant magazine.

== Canadian politics ==
In 2002, she was appointed the Special Envoy to the Peace Process in Sudan by the Government of Canada and served in that role until 2006. The same year, she was Chair of the Canadian Committee on Women Peace & Security.

Jaffer served as a Vice-President of the Liberal Party of Canada from 1994 to 1998 and as President of the National Women's Liberal Commission from 1998 to 2003. She also served on the board of the Liberal International in 1996. Jaffer ran unsuccessfully in the 1993 general election as the Liberal candidate in North Vancouver, and again in the 1997 election as the party's candidate in Burnaby--Douglas.

== Senate tenure ==
She was appointed to the Canadian Senate on June 13, 2001, on the advice of Prime Minister Jean Chrétien. She sat as a Liberal.

On January 29, 2014, Liberal Party leader Justin Trudeau announced all Liberal Senators, including Jaffer, were removed from the Liberal caucus, and would continue sitting as independents. The Senators refer to themselves as the Senate Liberal Caucus even though they are no longer members of the parliamentary Liberal caucus.

On December 20, 2018, Jaffer left the Senate Liberal Caucus to sit as a non-affiliated senator. On June 12, 2019, Jaffer joined the Independent Senators Group.

She sat on the Standing Senate Committees on National Security and Defence, Finance, Official Languages and Internal Affairs, and the Senate Subcommittees on Veterans Affairs and Diversity.

== Controversy ==
The Vancouver Sun reported on January 22, 2008 that the B.C. Law Society was investigating allegations of overbilling by Jaffer and her son for allegedly charging a Catholic missionary order, the Oblates of Mary Immaculate, fees of $6.7 million for work they did between 2000 and 2004 defending the Oblates against abuse claims made by former residents of the Canadian Indian residential school system. Allegations included evidence that Ms. Jaffer's son had billed 32.4 hours of work in a single day. In 2009, the Law Society of British Columbia's Discipline Subcommittee ordered Jaffer and her son to appear before separate conduct review subcommittee panels. At its regular meeting in March 2010, the Discipline Subcommittee agreed with the recommendations of those panels that no further action should be taken.

== Electoral history ==
1993 Canadian federal election: North Vancouver
Party	Candidate	Votes	%	±%
Reform	Ted White	20,213	39.97	+31.05
Liberal	Mobina Jaffer	15,934	31.51	+4.30
Progressive Conservative	Will McMartin	7,765	15.35	–22.29
New Democratic	Graeme Bowbrick	3,220	6.37	–17.49
National	Dallas Collis	2,220	4.39	–
Green	Arne B. Hansen	493	0.97	+0.04
Natural Law	Bradford Cooke	448	0.89	–
Independent	Clarke L. Ashley	147	0.29	–
Libertarian	Anthony Jasich	113	0.22	–0.23
Commonwealth of Canada	Paul G. Fraleigh	21	0.04	–
Total valid votes		50,574	99.59	
Total rejected ballots		209	0.41	+0.08
Turnout		50,783	72.46	–8.31
Eligible voters		70,082		
Reform gain from Progressive Conservative		Swing		+26.67
Source: Elections Canada
