= Andrew Saxton =

Canadian politician (born 1964)

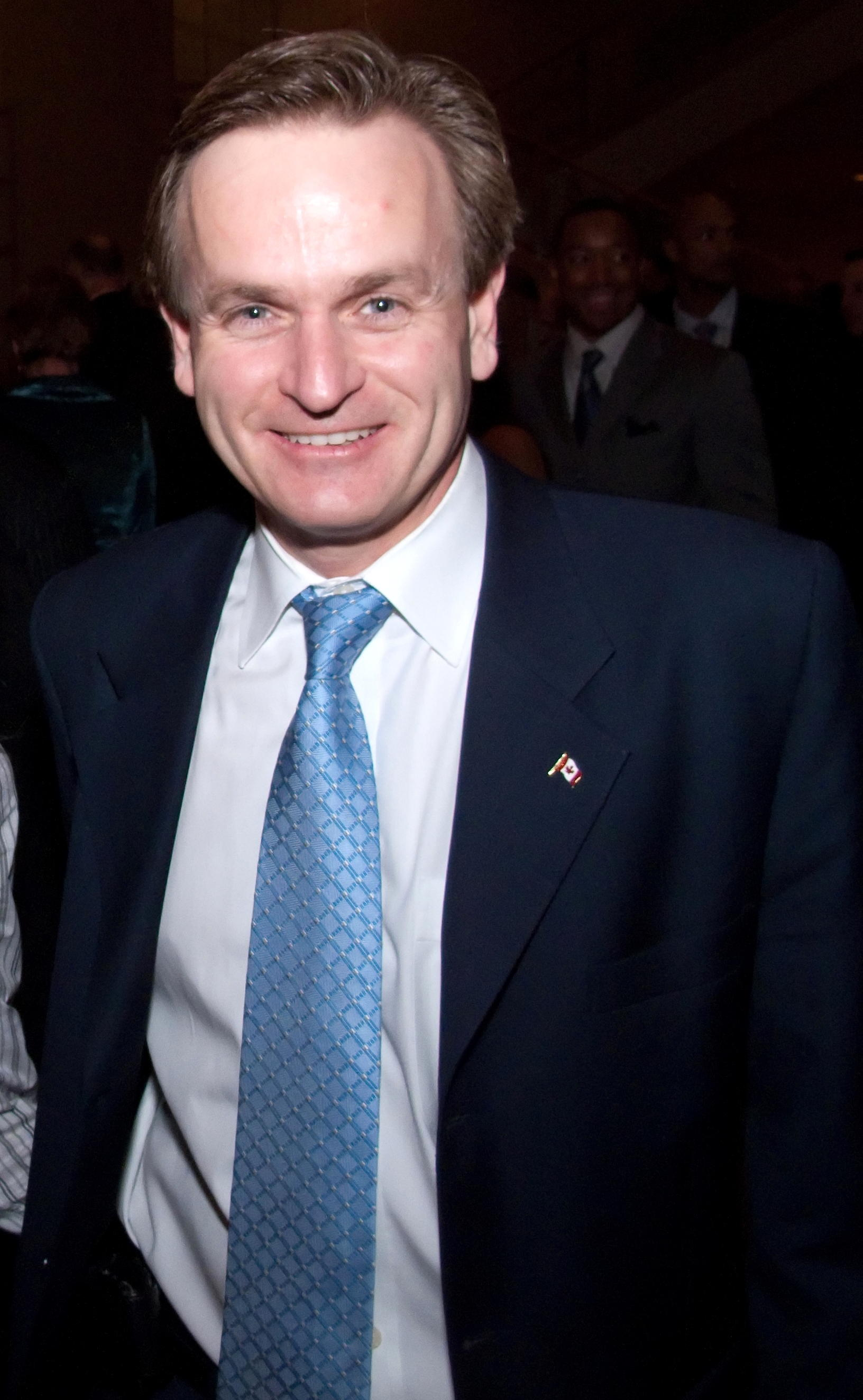
- Saxton in 2009

Member of Parliament for North Vancouver
- In office October 14, 2008 – August 4, 2015
- Preceded by: Don Bell
- Succeeded by: Jonathan Wilkinson

Parliamentary Secretary to the Minister of Finance
- In office September 9, 2013 – November 3, 2015
- Preceded by: Shelly Glover
- Succeeded by: François-Philippe Champagne

Parliamentary Secretary to the President of the Treasury Board and for Western Economic Diversification
- In office May 25, 2011 – September 18, 2013
- Preceded by: Russ Hiebert (as Parliamentary Secretary to the Minister of Intergovernmental Affairs and Minister of Western Economic Diversification)
- Succeeded by: Dan Albas

Parliamentary Secretary to the President of the Treasury Board
- In office November 7, 2008 – May 24, 2011
- Preceded by: Pierre Poilievre
- Succeeded by: Saxton as PS to the President of the Treasury Board and Western Economic Diversification

Personal details
- Born: March 11, 1964 (age 62) North Vancouver, British Columbia, Canada
- Party: Conservative
- Education: University of Western Ontario - BA
- Profession: Businessman, politician

Andrew Saxton (born March 11, 1964) is a Canadian politician and businessman who served as a member of Parliament (MP) represented the riding of North Vancouver in the House of Commons from 2008 to 2015. A member of the Conservative Party, he ran in the 2019 federal election and the 2017 leadership race, but was unsuccessful in both.

== Early life and education ==
Born in North Vancouver, British Columbia, Saxton is the son of a Hungarian father who arrived in Canada in 1947 and became a successful businessman. Saxton graduated with honours from Upper Canada College in 1982, where he served as head of Wedd's House and as a member of the UCC Board of Stewards. He went on to earn a Bachelor of Arts in Administrative and Commercial Studies (Finance) from the University of Western Ontario in 1986, now known as a Bachelor of Management and Organizational Studies (BMOS - Finance).

== Early career ==
Saxton began his career in finance with Credit Suisse in Switzerland and later held positions at Credit Suisse in New York City, where he was promoted to assistant treasurer. He returned to Vancouver with the firm before moving to Hong Kong in 1994 as senior account manager with HSBC. In 1997, he was appointed senior vice-president of HSBC Private Banking in Singapore.

Before entering politics, Saxton served as the CEO of King George Financial Corporation, a real-estate investment firm, and as a director of Canaco Resources Inc., a mineral exploration company. He was also involved in various community roles, including as director of the Heart & Stroke Foundation of BC and Yukon, member of the BC Premier's Asia Pacific Trade Council, and as a former member of the Vancouver City Planning Commission and the YVR Aeronautical Noise Management Committee. Saxton was also the founder and past president of the Pacific Club.

== Political career ==
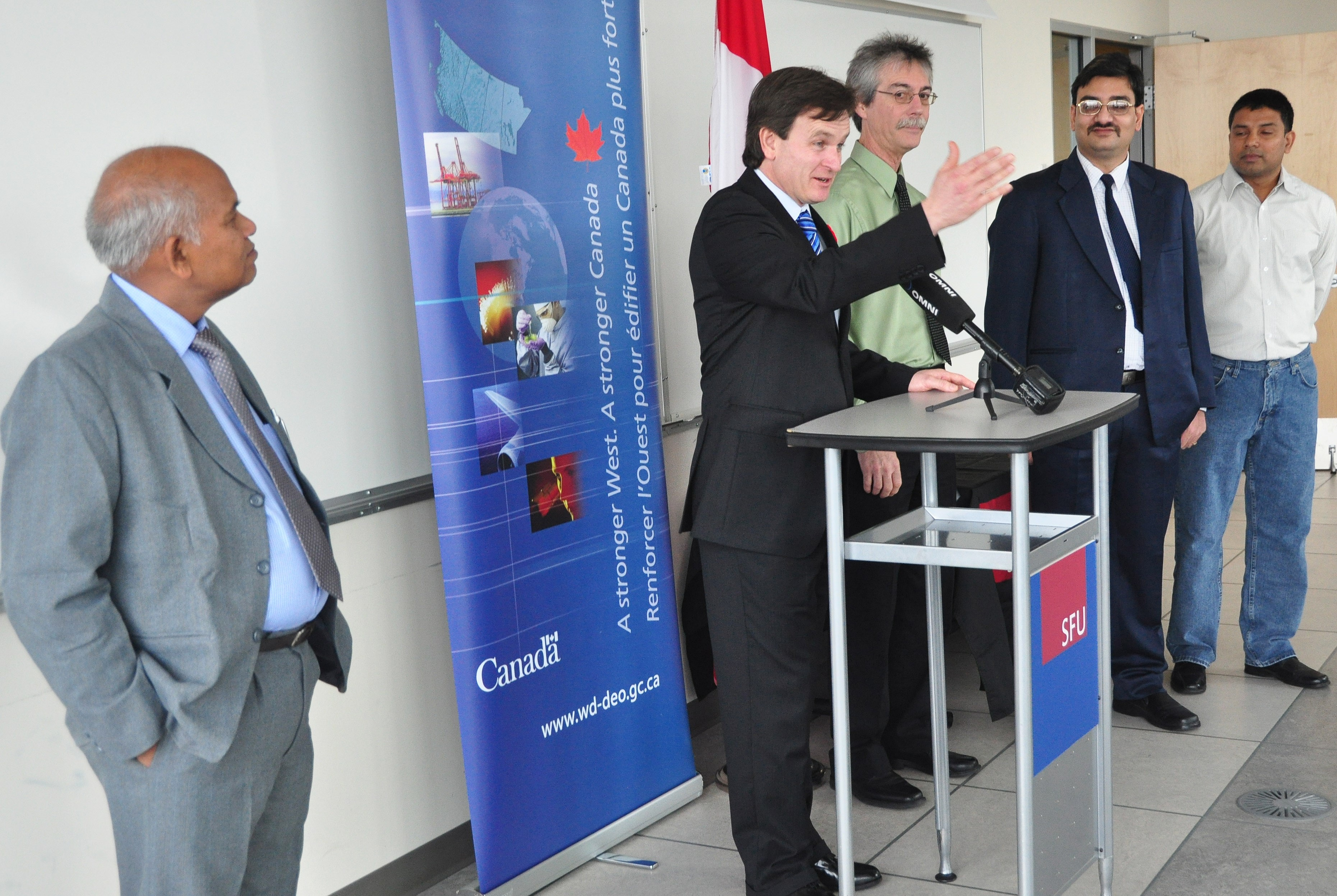
Parliamentary Secretary Saxton welcomes Indian scholars visiting Simon Fraser University, 2011

Saxton was first elected to the House of Commons in the 2008 Canadian federal election and was re-elected in 2011. He was appointed parliamentary secretary to the President of the Treasury Board after his first election and continued in this role after his re-election in 2011. In addition, he took on the responsibilities of Parliamentary Secretary to the Minister for Western Economic Diversification. In September 2013, he was appointed Parliamentary Secretary to the Minister of Finance, Jim Flaherty.

Saxton served on several parliamentary committees, including the Standing Committee on Public Accounts, the Joint Standing Committee on Scrutiny of Regulations, and the Finance Committee. He held leadership roles in various parliamentary friendship groups, including as vice-chair of the Canada-China Legislative Association and co-chair of the Canada-Philippines Interparliamentary Group. Saxton also chaired the Canada-Hong Kong, Canada-Malaysia, and Canada-Brunei Parliamentary Friendship Groups and served as vice-chair for Canada-Thailand and Canada-Vietnam Parliamentary Friendship Groups.

Saxton lost re-election in 2015 to Liberal candidate Jonathan Wilkinson and challenged him unsuccessfully in 2019.

In 2017, Saxton placed 13th in the Conservative Party of Canada leadership race.

== Post-political career ==
After leaving politics, Saxton returned to his business ventures and is currently the CEO of King George Financial Corporation, President of Saxton Capital Corporation, and President of Upper Island Development Ltd.

== Awards ==
In 2012, Saxton was awarded the Queen Elizabeth II Diamond Jubilee Medal for his service to his community. In 2016, he received the Order of Merit from the Republic of Hungary for his contributions to strengthening relations between Canada and Hungary.

== Electoral record ==
2019 Canadian federal election: North Vancouver
| Party | Candidate | Votes | % | ±% | Expenditures |
|---|---|---|---|---|---|
| Liberal | Jonathan Wilkinson | 26,979 | 42.87 | –13.78 | $100,896.06 |
| Conservative | Andrew Saxton | 16,908 | 26.87 | –0.02 | $100,554.62 |
| New Democratic | Justine Bell | 10,340 | 16.43 | +8.64 | $40,432.72 |
| Green | George Orr | 7,868 | 12.50 | +4.19 | $39,810.86 |
| People's | Azmairnin Jadavji | 835 | 1.33 | – | $33,414.76 |
| Total valid votes/expense limit | | 62,930 | 99.45 | – | $113,732.18 |
| Total rejected ballots | | 349 | 0.55 | +0.21 | |
| Turnout | | 63,279 | 71.20 | –4.57 | |
| Eligible voters | | 88,874 | | | |
| Liberal hold | | Swing | | –6.88 | |
Source: Elections Canada

2015 Canadian federal election: North Vancouver
| Party | Candidate | Votes | % | ±% | Expenditures |
|---|---|---|---|---|---|
| Liberal | Jonathan Wilkinson | 36,458 | 56.65 | +26.94 | $148,944.98 |
| Conservative | Andrew Saxton | 17,301 | 26.88 | –20.67 | $149,776.24 |
| Green | Claire Martin | 5,350 | 8.31 | +3.08 | $134,934.59 |
| New Democratic | Carleen Thomas | 5,015 | 7.79 | –9.07 | $21,413.99 |
| Libertarian | Ismet Yetisen | 136 | 0.21 | – | $22.40 |
| Independent | Payam Azad | 94 | 0.15 | – | $1,942.47 |
| Total valid votes/expense limit | | 64,354 | 99.66 | – | $220,823.27 |
| Total rejected ballots | | 218 | 0.34 | | |
| Turnout | | 64,572 | 75.77 | | |
| Eligible voters | | 85,219 | | | |
| Liberal gain from Conservative | | Swing | | +23.80 | |
Source: Elections Canada

2011 Canadian federal election: North Vancouver
| Party | Candidate | Votes | % | ±% | Expenditures |
|---|---|---|---|---|---|
| Conservative | Andrew Saxton | 28,996 | 48.62 | +6.37 | $92,458.35 |
| Liberal | Taleeb Noormohamed | 17,665 | 29.62 | –7.74 | $79,708.34 |
| New Democratic | Michael Charrois | 9,617 | 16.13 | +6.73 | $10,614.54 |
| Green | Greg Dowman | 3,004 | 5.04 | –5.66 | $336.39 |
| Independent | Nick Jones | 350 | 0.59 | – | $1,502.88 |
| Total valid votes/expense limit | | 59,632 | 99.74 | – | $93,241.88 |
| Total rejected ballots | | 153 | 0.26 | –0.02 | |
| Turnout | | 59,785 | 66.86 | +0.41 | |
| Eligible voters | | 89,416 | | | |
| Conservative hold | | Swing | | +7.06 | |
Source: Elections Canada

2008 Canadian federal election: North Vancouver
| Party | Candidate | Votes | % | ±% | Expenditures |
|---|---|---|---|---|---|
| Conservative | Andrew Saxton | 24,371 | 42.26 | +5.48 | $88,449.60 |
| Liberal | Don Bell | 21,551 | 37.37 | –4.98 | $86,166.72 |
| Green | Jim Stephenson | 6,168 | 10.69 | +3.21 | $16,920.50 |
| New Democratic | Michael Charrois | 5,417 | 9.39 | –3.81 | $7,250.53 |
| Libertarian | Tunya Audain | 166 | 0.29 | – | none listed |
| Total valid votes/expense limit | | 57,673 | 99.72 | – | $89,265.68 |
| Total rejected ballots | | 162 | 0.28 | +0.05 | |
| Turnout | | 57,835 | 66.45 | –3.44 | |
| Eligible voters | | 87,034 | | | |
| Conservative gain from Liberal | | Swing | | +5.23 | |
Source: Elections Canada

== See also ==
- 2017 Conservative Party of Canada leadership election
