= Capilano—Howe Sound =

Former federal electoral district in British Columbia, Canada

British Columbia electoral district

Defunct federal electoral district
- Legislature: House of Commons
- District created: 1987
- District abolished: 1996
- First contested: 1988
- Last contested: 1993

Capilano—Howe Sound was a federal electoral district in British Columbia, Canada, that was represented in the House of Commons of Canada from 1988 to 1997. This riding was created in 1987 from parts of Capilano and Cariboo—Chilcotin ridings.

It was abolished in 1996 when it was merged into West Vancouver—Sunshine Coast riding.

It consisted of the northwest part of the North Vancouver District Municipality, the District Municipality of West Vancouver, the part of electoral Area B of the Greater Vancouver Regional District west of the Capilano River and north of Electoral Area A, the Village of Lions Bay, Electoral Area C of the Greater Vancouver Regional District, and the Squamish-Lillooet Regional District, except Electoral Areas A and B and the Village of Lillooet.

== Members of Parliament ==
Parliament	Years	Member	Party
Riding created from Capilano and Cariboo—Chilcotin
34th	1988–1993	Mary Collins	Progressive Conservative
35th	1993–1997	Herb Grubel	Reform
Riding abolished: see West Vancouver—Sunshine Coast

== Electoral history ==
1993 Canadian federal election
Party	Candidate	Votes	%	±%
Reform	Herb Grubel	19,259	41.95	+33.78
Liberal	Audrey Sojonky	14,606	31.81	+2.13
Progressive Conservative	Mary Collins	8,130	17.71	–29.08
New Democratic	Sandra Bauer	1,529	3.33	–10.96
National	Doris Fuller	1,467	3.20	–
Green	Peggy Stortz	448	0.98	–
Natural Law	William Alexander Cameron	274	0.60	–
No affiliation	Audrey Ashley	105	0.23	–
Libertarian	Bill Tomlinson	77	0.17	–0.23
Commonwealth of Canada	Rolf A.F. Witzsche	15	0.03	–
Total valid votes		45,910	99.69	
Total rejected ballots		145	0.31	–0.11
Turnout		46,055	73.61	–8.93
Eligible voters		62,566		
Reform gain from Progressive Conservative		Swing		+15.64
Source: Elections Canada

1988 Canadian federal election
Party	Candidate	Votes	%	±%
Progressive Conservative	Mary Collins	20,219	46.79	–
Liberal	John D. Pozer	12,828	29.68	–
New Democratic	Olga Kempo	6,174	14.29	–
Reform	Neil Thompson	3,531	8.17	–
Rhinoceros	Alfred "The Alien" Frinton	292	0.68	–
Libertarian	Bill Tomlinson	173	0.40	–
Total valid votes		43,217	99.57	
Total rejected ballots		185	0.43	–
Turnout		43,402	82.54	–
Eligible voters		52,585		
Progressive Conservative notional hold		Swing		–
This riding was created from parts of Capilano and Cariboo—Chilcotin, both of which elected a Progressive Conservative in the previous election. Mary Collins was the incumbent from Capilano.
Source: Elections Canada

== See also ==
- List of Canadian electoral districts
- Historical federal electoral districts of Canada
