= North Vancouver—Capilano (federal electoral district) =

Federal electoral district in British Columbia, Canada

British Columbia electoral district
- Interactive map of riding boundaries from the 2025 federal election

Federal electoral district
- Legislature: House of Commons
MP
Braeden Caley
Liberal
- District created: 1987
- First contested: 1988
- Last contested: 2026
- District webpage: profile, map

Demographics
- Population (2011): 109,639
- Electors (2015): 82,085
- Area (km²): 342
- Pop. density (per km²): 320.6
- Census division: Greater Vancouver
- Census subdivision(s): North Vancouver (part), North Vancouver, West Vancouver (part), Capilano, Mission

North Vancouver—Capilano (formerly North Vancouver) is a federal electoral district in British Columbia, Canada, that has been represented in the House of Commons of Canada since 1988.

The riding was renamed in the 2022 federal electoral redistribution, and its boundaries were altered.

== Geography ==
As of the 2022 electoral redistribution, the North Vancouver—Capilano district (also called ridings in Canadian English) includes the entirety of the City of North Vancouver, part of the District of North Vancouver and the easternmost part of West Vancouver, including Park Royal Shopping Centre, Sentinel Hill and all of Ambleside.

== Demographics ==
According to the 2021 Canadian census, 2023 representation order

Race: 61.0% White, 12.3% West Asian, 7.3% Chinese, 4.3% Filipino, 3.4% South Asian, 2.9% Indigenous, 2.3% Korean, 1.7% Latin American, 1.2% Japanese
Languages: 65.2% English, 11.5% Persian, 3.3% Mandarin, 2.2% French, 1.9% Korean, 1.8% Tagalog, 1.8% Spanish, 1.4% Cantonese, 1.1% German
Religion: 34.5% Christian (13.7% Catholic, 3.9% Anglican, 3.5% United Church, 1.3% Christian Orthodox, 12.2% Other), 8.9% Muslim, 51.8% None
Median income: $45,200 (2020)
Average income: $71,700 (2020)

== History ==
North Vancouver—Capilano was created as North Vancouver in 1987 from portions of North Vancouver—Burnaby and Capilano electoral districts.

The 2012 federal electoral boundaries redistribution concluded that the electoral boundaries of North Vancouver should be adjusted, and a modified electoral district of the same name would be contested in future elections. The redefined North Vancouver lost the eastern portion of its territory to the new district of Burnaby North—Seymour while its western boundary with West Vancouver—Sunshine Coast—Sea to Sky Country was adjusted to correspond to the boundaries between the District of North Vancouver, West Vancouver and the Capilano Indian Reserve. These new boundaries were legally defined in the 2013 representation order, which came into effect upon the call of the 42nd Canadian federal election, which was held on October 19, 2015.

Following the 2022 Canadian federal electoral redistribution, the riding was renamed North Vancouver—Capilano. The 2022 distribution also incorporated all parts of West Vancouver—Sunshine Coast—Sea to Sky Country south of the Trans-Canada Highway and east of 21 Street, and shifted the Lynn Valley and Lynnmour areas to the Burnaby North—Seymour riding. The boundary change in West Vancouver was criticized by some, including Patrick Weiler, the member of Parliament previously representing that area. The new boundaries came into effect for the 2025 Canadian federal election.

== Members of Parliament ==
This riding has elected the following members of Parliament:

| Parliament | Years | Member | Party |
|---|---|---|---|
North Vancouver; Riding created from North Vancouver—Burnaby and Capilano
| 34th | 1988–1993 | Chuck Cook | Progressive Conservative |
| 35th | 1993–1997 | Ted White | Reform |
| 36th | 1997–2000 | Ted White | Reform |
| 36th | 2000–2000 | Ted White | Alliance |
| 37th | 2000–2003 | Ted White | Alliance |
| 37th | 2003–2004 | Ted White | Conservative |
| 38th | 2004–2006 | Don Bell | Liberal |
| 39th | 2006–2008 | Don Bell | Liberal |
| 40th | 2008–2011 | Andrew Saxton | Conservative |
| 41st | 2011–2015 | Andrew Saxton | Conservative |
| 42nd | 2015–2019 | Jonathan Wilkinson | Liberal |
| 43rd | 2019–2021 | Jonathan Wilkinson | Liberal |
| 44th | 2021–2025 | Jonathan Wilkinson | Liberal |
North Vancouver—Capilano
| 45th | 2025–2026 | Jonathan Wilkinson | Liberal |
| 45th | 2026–present | Braeden Caley | Liberal |

Upon its creation in 1988, North Vancouver—Capilano was initially won by right-leaning candidates. It was first represented by Chuck Cook of the Progressive Conservative Party. In the 1993 federal election, the riding was won by Ted White, then a member of the Reform Party. White was re-elected in the 1997 federal election and 2000 federal election, as a member of the Canadian Alliance. During the 37th Canadian Parliament, White joined the Conservative Party.

However, in the 2004 federal election, outgoing North Vancouver mayor Don Bell flipped the riding to the Liberal Party, narrowly defeating incumbent Ted White. Bell was re-elected in the 2006 federal election. In the 2008 federal election, North Vancouver businessman Andrew Saxton flipped the riding back to the Conservative Party.

In the 2015 federal election, Jonathan Wilkinson flipped the riding back to the Liberals, receiving 56.7% of the vote. Wilkinson won re-election in the 2019 federal election (42.9%), 2021 federal election (45.1%), and 2025 federal election (59.8%).

== Election results ==
View source data.
Graph of election results in North Vancouver (minor parties that never got 2% of the vote or didn't run consistently are omitted)

=== North Vancouver—Capilano ===
Canadian federal by-election, August 31, 2026: North Vancouver—Capilano Resignation of Jonathan Wilkinson
The by-election will be held on August 31, 2026.
| Party | Candidate | Votes | % | ±% |
|---|---|---|---|---|
| Liberal | Braeden Caley | | | |
| Conservative | Stephen Curran | | | |
| Green | Shelley Luce | | | |
| New Democratic | Stephen Tweedale | | | |
| People's | Ehsan Arjmand | | | |
| Independent | Jeff Monds | | | |
| Total valid votes | | | | |
| Total rejected ballots | | | | |
| Turnout | | | | |
| Eligible voters | | 88,358 | | |
Source: Elections Canada

2025 Canadian federal election
| Party | Candidate | Votes | % | ±% | Expenditures |
|---|---|---|---|---|---|
| Liberal | Jonathan Wilkinson | 37,907 | 59.82 | +15.13 | $127,665.30 |
| Conservative | Stephen Curran | 21,339 | 33.68 | +4.30 | $108,928.99 |
| New Democratic | Tammy Bentz | 2,684 | 4.24 | –14.82 | $37,474.25 |
| Green | Andrew Robinson | 1,076 | 1.70 | –2.57 | $20,398.54 |
| People's | Ehsan Arjmand | 256 | 0.40 | –2.17 | $660.53 |
| Independent | Oliver King | 102 | 0.16 | – | none listed |
| Total valid votes/expense limit | | 63,364 | 99.39 | – | $133,984.48 |
| Total rejected ballots | | 390 | 0.61 | –0.03 | |
| Turnout | | 63,754 | 71.65 | +6.98 | |
| Eligible voters | | 88,977 | | | |
| Liberal hold | | Swing | | +5.42 | |
Source: Elections Canada

2021 federal election redistributed results
| Party | Vote | % |
|---|---|---|
| Liberal | 24,447 | 44.69 |
| Conservative | 16,071 | 29.38 |
| New Democratic | 10,422 | 19.05 |
| Green | 2,335 | 4.27 |
| People's | 1,408 | 2.57 |
| Independents | 12 | 0.02 |
| Rhinoceros | 6 | 0.01 |
| Total valid votes | 54,701 | 99.36 |
| Rejected ballots | 351 | 0.64 |
| Registered voters/ estimated turnout | 85,122 | 64.67 |

=== North Vancouver ===
2021 Canadian federal election: North Vancouver
| Party | Candidate | Votes | % | ±% | Expenditures |
|---|---|---|---|---|---|
| Liberal | Jonathan Wilkinson | 26,756 | 45.10 | +2.23 | $99,115.36 |
| Conservative | Leslie (Les) Jickling | 16,671 | 28.10 | +1.24 | $103,363.29 |
| New Democratic | Tammy Bentz | 11,750 | 19.81 | +3.38 | $20,351.82 |
| Green | Archie Kaario | 2,598 | 4.38 | –8.12 | $11,600.97 |
| People's | John Galloway | 1,545 | 2.60 | +1.28 | none listed |
| Total valid votes/expense limit | | 59,320 | 99.36 | – | $118,692.36 |
| Total rejected ballots | | 383 | 0.64 | +0.09 | |
| Turnout | | 59,703 | 66.02 | –5.18 | |
| Eligible voters | | 90,437 | | | |
| Liberal hold | | Swing | | +0.50 | |
Source: Elections Canada

2019 Canadian federal election: North Vancouver
| Party | Candidate | Votes | % | ±% | Expenditures |
|---|---|---|---|---|---|
| Liberal | Jonathan Wilkinson | 26,979 | 42.87 | –13.78 | $100,896.06 |
| Conservative | Andrew Saxton | 16,908 | 26.87 | –0.02 | $100,554.62 |
| New Democratic | Justine Bell | 10,340 | 16.43 | +8.64 | $40,432.72 |
| Green | George Orr | 7,868 | 12.50 | +4.19 | $39,810.86 |
| People's | Azmairnin Jadavji | 835 | 1.33 | – | $33,414.76 |
| Total valid votes/expense limit | | 62,930 | 99.45 | – | $113,732.18 |
| Total rejected ballots | | 349 | 0.55 | +0.21 | |
| Turnout | | 63,279 | 71.20 | –4.57 | |
| Eligible voters | | 88,874 | | | |
| Liberal hold | | Swing | | –6.88 | |
Source: Elections Canada

2015 Canadian federal election: North Vancouver
| Party | Candidate | Votes | % | ±% | Expenditures |
|---|---|---|---|---|---|
| Liberal | Jonathan Wilkinson | 36,458 | 56.65 | +26.94 | $148,944.98 |
| Conservative | Andrew Saxton | 17,301 | 26.88 | –20.67 | $149,776.24 |
| Green | Claire Martin | 5,350 | 8.31 | +3.08 | $134,934.59 |
| New Democratic | Carleen Thomas | 5,015 | 7.79 | –9.07 | $21,413.99 |
| Libertarian | Ismet Yetisen | 136 | 0.21 | – | $22.40 |
| Independent | Payam Azad | 94 | 0.15 | – | $1,942.47 |
| Total valid votes/expense limit | | 64,354 | 99.66 | – | $220,823.27 |
| Total rejected ballots | | 218 | 0.34 | | |
| Turnout | | 64,572 | 75.77 | | |
| Eligible voters | | 85,219 | | | |
| Liberal gain from Conservative | | Swing | | +23.80 | |
Source: Elections Canada

2011 federal election redistributed results
| Party | Vote | % |
|---|---|---|
| Conservative | 23,923 | 47.55 |
| Liberal | 14,948 | 29.71 |
| New Democratic | 8,481 | 16.86 |
| Green | 2,631 | 5.23 |
| Others | 322 | 0.64 |

2011 Canadian federal election: North Vancouver
| Party | Candidate | Votes | % | ±% | Expenditures |
|---|---|---|---|---|---|
| Conservative | Andrew Saxton | 28,996 | 48.62 | +6.37 | $92,458.35 |
| Liberal | Taleeb Noormohamed | 17,665 | 29.62 | –7.74 | $79,708.34 |
| New Democratic | Michael Charrois | 9,617 | 16.13 | +6.73 | $10,614.54 |
| Green | Greg Dowman | 3,004 | 5.04 | –5.66 | $336.39 |
| Independent | Nick Jones | 350 | 0.59 | – | $1,502.88 |
| Total valid votes/expense limit | | 59,632 | 99.74 | – | $93,241.88 |
| Total rejected ballots | | 153 | 0.26 | –0.02 | |
| Turnout | | 59,785 | 66.86 | +0.41 | |
| Eligible voters | | 89,416 | | | |
| Conservative hold | | Swing | | +7.06 | |
Source: Elections Canada

2008 Canadian federal election: North Vancouver
| Party | Candidate | Votes | % | ±% | Expenditures |
|---|---|---|---|---|---|
| Conservative | Andrew Saxton | 24,371 | 42.26 | +5.48 | $88,449.60 |
| Liberal | Don Bell | 21,551 | 37.37 | –4.98 | $86,166.72 |
| Green | Jim Stephenson | 6,168 | 10.69 | +3.21 | $16,920.50 |
| New Democratic | Michael Charrois | 5,417 | 9.39 | –3.81 | $7,250.53 |
| Libertarian | Tunya Audain | 166 | 0.29 | – | none listed |
| Total valid votes/expense limit | | 57,673 | 99.72 | – | $89,265.68 |
| Total rejected ballots | | 162 | 0.28 | +0.05 | |
| Turnout | | 57,835 | 66.45 | –3.44 | |
| Eligible voters | | 87,034 | | | |
| Conservative gain from Liberal | | Swing | | +5.23 | |
Source: Elections Canada

2006 Canadian federal election: North Vancouver
| Party | Candidate | Votes | % | ±% | Expenditures |
|---|---|---|---|---|---|
| Liberal | Don Bell | 25,357 | 42.35 | +2.32 | $78,709.24 |
| Conservative | Cindy Silver | 22,021 | 36.78 | +0.41 | $82,284.86 |
| New Democratic | Sherry Shaghaghi | 7,903 | 13.20 | –2.67 | $14,389.31 |
| Green | Jim Stephenson | 4,483 | 7.49 | +0.21 | $15,613.36 |
| Marxist–Leninist | Michael Hill | 112 | 0.19 | +0.05 | none listed |
| Total valid votes/expense limit | | 59,876 | 99.77 | – | $83,093.96 |
| Total rejected ballots | | 140 | 0.23 | –0.05 | |
| Turnout | | 60,016 | 69.89 | +1.72 | |
| Eligible voters | | 85,876 | | | |
| Liberal hold | | Swing | | +0.95 | |
Source: Elections Canada

2004 Canadian federal election: North Vancouver
| Party | Candidate | Votes | % | ±% | Expenditures |
|---|---|---|---|---|---|
| Liberal | Don Bell | 22,619 | 40.03 | +7.48 | $66,974.01 |
| Conservative | Ted White | 20,548 | 36.36 | –20.75 | $58,779.65 |
| New Democratic | John Nelson | 8,967 | 15.87 | +10.95 | $21,328.35 |
| Green | Peggy Stortz | 4,114 | 7.28 | – | $3,241.79 |
| Canadian Action | Andres Esteban Barker | 181 | 0.32 | – | $400.25 |
| Marxist–Leninist | Michael Hill | 77 | 0.14 | – | none listed |
| Total valid votes/expense limit | | 56,506 | 99.72 | – | $79,937.85 |
| Total rejected ballots | | 158 | 0.28 | – | |
| Turnout | | 56,664 | 68.16 | – | |
| Eligible voters | | 83,129 | | | |
| Liberal notional gain from Conservative | | Swing | | +14.11 | |
Change is based on redistributed results. Conservative vote is compared to the total of the Canadian Alliance vote and Progressive Conservative vote in 2000 election.
Source: Elections Canada

2000 federal election redistributed results
| Party | Vote | % |
|---|---|---|
| Canadian Alliance | 25,930 | 50.02 |
| Liberal | 16,874 | 32.55 |
| Progressive Conservative | 3,678 | 7.09 |
| New Democratic | 2,551 | 4.92 |
| Others | 2,807 | 5.41 |

2000 Canadian federal election: North Vancouver
| Party | Candidate | Votes | % | ±% | Expenditures |
|---|---|---|---|---|---|
| Alliance | Ted White | 27,920 | 49.88 | +1.01 | $60,178 |
| Liberal | Bill Bell | 18,343 | 32.77 | –1.17 | $50,482 |
| Progressive Conservative | Laurence Putnam | 3,975 | 7.10 | +2.16 | $1,278 |
| New Democratic | Sam Schechter | 2,760 | 4.93 | –4.23 | $2,769 |
| Marijuana | Tunya Audain | 1,008 | 1.80 | – | $23 |
| Canadian Action | Diana Jewell | 877 | 1.57 | +1.20 | $547 |
| Independent | Dallas Collis | 760 | 1.36 | +0.70 | $1,134 |
| Independent | Rusty Corben | 253 | 0.45 | – | none listed |
| Marxist–Leninist | Michael Hill | 80 | 0.14 | – | $33 |
| Total valid votes | | 55,976 | 99.71 | | |
| Total rejected ballots | | 164 | 0.29 | –0.01 | |
| Turnout | | 56,140 | 68.80 | –3.04 | |
| Eligible voters | | 81,601 | | | |
| Alliance hold | | Swing | | +1.09 | |
Canadian Alliance vote is compared to the Reform vote in 1997 election.
Source: Elections Canada

1997 Canadian federal election: North Vancouver
| Party | Candidate | Votes | % | ±% | Expenditures |
|---|---|---|---|---|---|
| Reform | Ted White | 27,075 | 48.86 | +8.44 | $63,443 |
| Liberal | Warren Kinsella | 18,806 | 33.94 | +2.02 | $62,704 |
| New Democratic | Martin Stuible | 5,075 | 9.16 | +3.47 | $11,938 |
| Progressive Conservative | Dennis Prouse | 2,740 | 4.95 | –10.61 | $14,159 |
| Green | Peggy Stortz | 982 | 1.77 | – | $173 |
| Independent | Dallas Collis | 365 | 0.66 | – | none listed |
| Canadian Action | Wayne Mulherin | 203 | 0.37 | – | $1,359 |
| Natural Law | Ken Chawkin | 162 | 0.29 | – | none listed |
| Total valid votes | | 55,408 | 99.70 | | |
| Total rejected ballots | | 167 | 0.30 | – | |
| Turnout | | 55,575 | 71.83 | – | |
| Eligible voters | | 77,366 | | | |
| Reform hold | | Swing | | +3.21 | |
Source: Elections Canada

1993 federal election redistributed results
| Party | Vote | % |
|---|---|---|
| Reform | 24,767 | 40.43 |
| Liberal | 19,556 | 31.92 |
| Progressive Conservative | 9,533 | 15.56 |
| New Democratic | 3,488 | 5.69 |
| Others | 3,922 | 6.40 |

1993 Canadian federal election: North Vancouver
| Party | Candidate | Votes | % | ±% |
|---|---|---|---|---|
| Reform | Ted White | 20,213 | 39.97 | +31.05 |
| Liberal | Mobina Jaffer | 15,934 | 31.51 | +4.30 |
| Progressive Conservative | Will McMartin | 7,765 | 15.35 | –22.29 |
| New Democratic | Graeme Bowbrick | 3,220 | 6.37 | –17.49 |
| National | Dallas Collis | 2,220 | 4.39 | – |
| Green | Arne B. Hansen | 493 | 0.97 | +0.04 |
| Natural Law | Bradford Cooke | 448 | 0.89 | – |
| Independent | Clarke L. Ashley | 147 | 0.29 | – |
| Libertarian | Anthony Jasich | 113 | 0.22 | –0.23 |
| Commonwealth of Canada | Paul G. Fraleigh | 21 | 0.04 | – |
| Total valid votes | | 50,574 | 99.59 | |
| Total rejected ballots | | 209 | 0.41 | +0.08 |
| Turnout | | 50,783 | 72.46 | –8.31 |
| Eligible voters | | 70,082 | | |
| Reform gain from Progressive Conservative | | Swing | | +26.67 |
Source: Elections Canada

1988 Canadian federal election: North Vancouver
| Party | Candidate | Votes | % | ±% |
|---|---|---|---|---|
| Progressive Conservative | Chuck Cook | 18,515 | 37.64 | ~–11% |
| Liberal | James Hatton | 13,382 | 27.21 | ~+0% |
| New Democratic | Donna Stewart | 11,735 | 23.86 | ~+3% |
| Reform | Ron Gamble | 4,387 | 8.92 | – |
| Green | Glen Ash | 462 | 0.94 | – |
| Rhinoceros | Richard "The Troll" Schaller | 323 | 0.66 | – |
| Libertarian | Tunya Audain | 225 | 0.46 | – |
| Communist | Betty Griffin | 78 | 0.16 | – |
| Independent | Brian Smith | 49 | 0.10 | – |
| Independent | Barrie A. Hewer | 30 | 0.06 | – |
| Total valid votes | | 49,186 | 99.67 | |
| Total rejected ballots | | 162 | 0.33 | – |
| Turnout | | 49,348 | 80.77 | – |
| Eligible voters | | 61,099 | | |
| Progressive Conservative notional hold | | Swing | | ~–6% |
This riding was created from parts of North Vancouver—Burnaby and Capilano, both of which elected a Progressive Conservative in the previous election. Chuck Cook was the incumbent from North Vancouver—Burnaby.
Source: Elections Canada

1984 federal election redistributed results
| Party | Vote | % |
|---|---|---|
| Progressive Conservative | ~22,500 | ~49% |
| Liberal | ~12,500 | ~27% |
| New Democratic | ~9,500 | ~21% |
| Others | ~1,500 | ~3% |

== See also ==
- List of Canadian electoral districts
- Historical federal electoral districts of Canada
