= Douglas Kinsella =

Canadian immunologist (1932–2004)

- Born: 15 February 1932; Montreal, Quebec, Canada
- Died: 15 June 2004 (aged 72); Kingston, Ontario, Canada
- Education: McGill University
- Occupations: doctor, ethics expert
- Known for: founder of Canada's National Council on Ethics in Human Research

Thomas Douglas Kinsella, CM (15 February 1932 – 15 June 2004) was a Canadian medical doctor and expert on medical ethics and founder of Canada's National Council on Ethics in Human Research.

== Career ==
Kinsella is particularly noted for his research on ethical, legal and medical issues surrounding assisted suicide, euthanasia and genetics research. He is well known for championing research ethics, particularly as these apply to human experimentation, and was a founding member of the Tri-Council Working Group on Ethics.

Kinsella studied medicine at McGill University in Montreal in the 1950s and became professor at Queen's University in 1968. After two years at McGill, he moved to the University of Calgary, where he spent the rest of his career. In 1984, the University of Calgary appointed Kinsella as associate dean for medical bioethics. He practiced as a rheumatologist. In 1995, he was awarded the Order of Canada for his contributions to the field of bioethics. He was president of the Canadian Bioethics Society and a prominent witness during hearings on euthanasia held by the Canadian senate in 1995.

=== Legacy ===
The Canadian Institutes of Health Research supply an annual research grant in Kinsella's name to "the highest ranking CIHR Doctoral Research Award or Canada Graduate Scholarships Doctoral Award applicant whose research focuses on ethical issues related to health and/or health research." The CIHR Douglas Kinsella Doctoral Award for Research in Bioethics was first awarded in 2005.

== Personal life ==
Kinsella married his wife Lorna in Montreal in 1955. They had three sons: Warren, Kevin, and Lorne.
