= Chuck Cook =

Canadian politician (1926–1993)

Member of Parliament for North Vancouver—Burnaby
- In office 1979–1988
- Preceded by: riding created
- Succeeded by: riding dissolved

Member of Parliament for North Vancouver
- In office 1988–1993
- Preceded by: riding created
- Succeeded by: Ted White

Personal details
- Born: Charles Henry Cook; 28 July 1926 Regina, Saskatchewan
- Died: 23 February 1993 (aged 66)
- Party: Progressive Conservative
- Profession: broadcaster

Charles Henry "Chuck" Cook (28 July 1926 – 23 February 1993) was a broadcaster and politician in Canada.

Cook was born in Regina, Saskatchewan. He became a CJOR radio talk show host in Vancouver, British Columbia in the 1970s. He served as Progressive Conservative Member of Parliament from 1979 to 1988 in the riding of North Vancouver—Burnaby and from 1988 to 1993, in the riding of North Vancouver. He also ran for the Progressive Conservative Party of Alberta in the riding of Calgary Centre in the 1967 election but came up a very close second to Frederick C. Colborne of the Alberta Social Credit Party.

He died of cancer before finishing his term as member in the 34th Canadian Parliament.
