= Mary Collins (politician) =

Canadian politician (born 1940)

Member of the House of Commons of Canada
- In office 1984–1993
- Preceded by: Ron Huntington
- Succeeded by: Herb Grubel
- Constituency: Capilano (1984–1988); Capilano—Howe Sound (1988–1993)

Personal details
- Born: September 26, 1940 (age 86) Canada
- Party: Progressive Conservative

Mary Collins PC (born September 26, 1940) is a former Canadian politician.

== Biography ==
She was first elected to the House of Commons of Canada in the 1984 federal election as the Progressive Conservative Member of Parliament for Capilano, British Columbia.

She retained her seat in the 1988 federal election for the redistributed riding of Capilano—Howe Sound. She was appointed to the Cabinet of Prime Minister Brian Mulroney as Associate Minister of National Defence from 1989 to 1993. She also served as Minister responsible for the Status of Women from 1990 to 1993.

In January 1993, she became Minister of Western Economic Diversification and Minister of State for the environment as well as Status of Women.

When Kim Campbell succeeded Mulroney as PC leader and prime minister in June 1993, she promoted Collins to the positions of Minister of National Health and Welfare and Minister of Amateur Sport.

Her career ended that fall with the defeat of the Campbell government in the 1993 federal election,

After leaving politics, Collins was President of the BC Health Association. She served as an honorary co-chair of the women's campaign school of the Canadian Women Voters Congress and as a consultant in promoting women's political development in Vietnam, Ukraine and Mongolia. She then spent five years in Russia (2002–2007) working on a health reform project in Chuvashia and for the World Health Organization in Moscow. As of March 2008, she became the Executive Director of the BC Alliance for Healthy Living until her retirement in March 2018. She lives in Victoria, BC, where she serves as a member of the Saanich Police Board and is also a member of the Pacific Opera Victoria Board and the Boards of the Canadian International Council Victoria Chapter, the BC Association of Police Boards as well as Goward House. She holds honorary doctorate degrees from Royal Roads University and Royal Roads Military College and is a recipient of the Distinguished Alumni Award from Queen's University and was the inaugural recipient of the Kathleen Beaumont Hill award given by the Vancouver Queen's University Alumni. She also has received the Queen's Jubilee Award.
