= Ted White (politician) =

Canadian politician

Member of Parliament for North Vancouver
- In office 25 October 1993 – 28 June 2004
- Preceded by: Chuck Cook
- Succeeded by: Don Bell

Personal details
- Born: 1949 (age 76–77) Southampton, England
- Party: Conservative
- Other political affiliations: Reform Party, Canadian Alliance

Edward Alexander White (born 18 April 1949) is a former Canadian politician who served in the House of Commons of Canada from 1993 to 2004.

Born in Southampton, England, White was first elected in the British Columbia riding of North Vancouver in 1993 as a Reform Party of Canada candidate. He was re-elected in 1997 and 2000. While he was a member of parliament, Reform became known as the Canadian Alliance, then merged with the Progressive-Conservatives into the Conservative Party of Canada. White was defeated in the 2004 federal election by Liberal candidate Don Bell, therefore serving in the 35th through 37th Canadian Parliaments.

In the 1983 British Columbia general election, he was a candidate for the separatist Western Canada Concept party in the North Vancouver-Seymour riding.

== Achievements ==
In June 1994, White became the first MP in Canada to use electronic voting to sample the opinions of constituents. He was criticized by opponents at the time because there was a charge to place the call to vote, but White defended the charge as the only way to pay for the services being provided by Maritime Tel.

White was the Official Opposition Critic for a major overhaul of the Elections Act in late 1999. The only Official Opposition amendment to the Bill, C-2, permitted by the Minister at the time, the Hon. Don Boudria, was the insertion of Clause 18.1, which permitted Elections Canada to experiment with electronic voting methods. Throughout the Committee hearings, White had ardently pushed for the provision, but Minister Boudria opposed it. Agreement for the insertion of the clause was reached on the evening of 1 December 1999, during a telephone discussion between White and Boudria. The clause remains intact with a minor wording change in Bill C-23, which was introduced during the 41st Parliament to amend the Elections Act.

== Electoral history ==
2004 Canadian federal election: North Vancouver
Party	Candidate	Votes	%	±%	Expenditures
Liberal	Don Bell	22,619	40.02	+7.26	$72,712
Conservative	Ted White	20,548	36.36	-20.61	$60,651
New Democratic	John Nelson	8,967	15.86	+10.93	$21,278
Green	Peggy Stortz	4,114	7.28	–	$3,241
Canadian Action	Andres Esteban Barker	181	0.32	-1.24	$400
Marxist–Leninist	Michael Hill	77	0.13	-0.01	
Total valid votes		56,506	100.0		
Total rejected ballots		158	0.28	-0.01	
Turnout		56,664	68.16	-0.64	
Liberal gain from Alliance		Swing		+13.94	
Conservative vote is compared to the total of the Canadian Alliance vote and Progressive Conservative vote in 2000 election.

2000 Canadian federal election: North Vancouver
Party	Candidate	Votes	%	±%	Expenditures
Alliance	Ted White	27,920	49.87	+1.01	$60,178
Liberal	Bill Bell	18,343	32.76	-1.18	$50,482
Progressive Conservative	Laurence Putnam	3,975	7.10	+2.16	$1,278
New Democratic	Sam Schechter	2,760	4.93	-4.22	$2,769
Marijuana	Tunya Audain	1,008	1.80	–	$23
Canadian Action	Diana Jewell	877	1.56	+1.20	$547
Independent	Dallas Collis	760	1.35	+0.70	$1,134
Independent	Rusty Corben	253	0.45	–	
Marxist–Leninist	Michael Hill	80	0.14	–	$33
Total valid votes		55,976	100.0		
Total rejected ballots		164	0.29	-0.01	
Turnout		56,140	68.80	-3.03	
Alliance hold		Swing		+1.10	
Canadian Alliance vote is compared to the Reform vote in 1997 election.

1997 Canadian federal election: North Vancouver
Party	Candidate	Votes	%	±%	Expenditures
Reform	Ted White	27,075	48.86	+8.85	$63,443
Liberal	Warren Kinsella	18,806	33.94	+2.87	$62,704
New Democratic	Martin Stuible	5,075	9.15	+2.77	$11,938
Progressive Conservative	Dennis Prouse	2,740	4.94	-11.00	$14,159
Green	Peggy Stortz	982	1.77	–	$173
Independent	Dallas Lindley Collins	365	0.65	–	
Canadian Action	Wayne Mulherin	203	0.36	–	$1,359
Natural Law	Ken Chawkin	162	0.29	-0.59	
Total valid votes		55,408	100.0		
Total rejected ballots		167	0.30		
Turnout		55,575	71.83		
Reform hold		Swing		+2.99	

1993 Canadian federal election: North Vancouver
Party	Candidate	Votes	%	±%
Reform	Ted White	20,407	40.01	+31.09
Liberal	Mobina Jaffer	15,951	31.27	+4.06
Progressive Conservative	Will McMartin	7,900	15.49	-22.16
New Democratic	Graeme Bowbrick	3,254	6.38	-17.48
National	Dallas Collis	2,234	4.38	–
Green	Arne B. Hansen	534	1.05	+0.11
Natural Law	Bradford Cooke	447	0.88	–
Independent	Clarke L. Ashley	144	0.28	–
Libertarian	Anthony Jasich	116	0.23	–
Commonwealth of Canada	Paul Fraleigh	22	0.04	–
Total valid votes		51,009	100.0	
Reform gain from Progressive Conservative		Swing		+13.52
