= Hieronymus Sailer =

16th-century Swiss merchant and banker

- Born: 1495; Saint Gall, Old Swiss Confederacy
- Died: 15 June 1559; Augsburg, Holy Roman Empire
- Occupations: Merchant, banker, factor
- Spouse: Felicitas Welser (m. 1533)
- Children: At least six
- Parent: Unknown

Hieronymus Sailer (also Sayler or Seiler; 1495 – 15 June 1559) was a Swiss merchant and banker who served as a factor and agent for the prominent Welser banking family of Augsburg. Born in Saint Gall, he became a key figure in the Welser's international commercial operations, particularly their colonial ventures in Venezuela and their financial dealings with the Habsburg courts of Spain and France.

== Early life and family ==
Little is known about Sailer's childhood and youth, and the names of his parents remain unknown. He had several siblings who lived in Saint Gall, including brothers Hans and Ulrich, and sisters Wibrat and Dorothea. His brother Ulrich met a tragic end in 1535 when he was killed by indigenous people in Venezuela, in the colony known as Klein-Venedig ("Little Venice") that was operated by the Welser family.

Sailer entered the Welser commercial company in Augsburg at a young age and was likely sent by them to Como for his commercial training. In 1533, he married Felicitas Welser, one of the daughters of his employer Bartholomäus V Welser, who headed the commercial company. This marriage significantly strengthened his position within the Welser organization. The couple had at least six children together.

== Career with the Welser ==
=== Early commercial activities ===
After a stay in Lisbon in 1519, Sailer worked for the Welser at the court of the King of Spain from 1524 at the latest. There he conducted important transactions in the annuity sector (letter of annuity) and corresponded with Hernán Cortés in America regarding maritime trade. In 1525, he was ennobled by Charles V, who was indebted to the Welser family.

=== Colonial ventures and slave trade ===
In 1528, Sailer played a crucial role in negotiating treaties with Charles V on behalf of the Welser. Working alongside Heinrich Ehinger of Konstanz, who served as a full director (Faktor) of a Welser trading post, Sailer concluded agreements concerning the colonization of Klein-Venedig, the deportation of 4,000 enslaved people from West Africa, and the transfer of German miners to the Caribbean. The rights negotiated in 1528 were transferred to the Welser company in 1530.

The colonial venture proved ultimately disastrous for the Welser family. Following the revocation of the treaties by the King of Spain, Sailer's brother-in-law Bartholomäus VI Welser, who was present in the colony, was executed in 1546 by Vice-Governor Juan de Carvajal. It is documented that Melchior Grübel, an acquaintance of Sailer, was involved in Klein-Venedig affairs from 1535 onwards.

=== European operations ===
Sailer never left Europe himself, despite his involvement in overseas ventures. Through his marriage, he obtained citizenship of Augsburg in 1533, where he became a member of the corporation of notables. In 1537, in Augsburg and possibly also in Spain, he initiated his nephew Michael Sailer (future head of the Welser trading post in Lyon) into the affairs of the commercial house.

Until 1539, Sailer defended the Welser's interests at the Spanish royal court, after which he directed their trading post in the commercial metropolis of Antwerp. During the 1540s, he conducted financial transactions (credit) with the Habsburgs in Antwerp and with the French royal court in Lyon. In Lyon, he was able to benefit from his status as a citizen of Saint Gall, which allowed him to take advantage of the political neutrality and commercial privileges granted to the Confederates by France.

== Later career and legal troubles ==
The renewal of Sailer's Saint Gall citizenship rights in 1543 was contested, but he found important political support from his friend Joachim Vadian. In the second half of the 1540s, Sailer stayed in Antwerp and Lyon, as well as in Augsburg, Memmingen, Lindau, and Saint Gall. His financial operations with the King of France proved politically problematic, particularly during the war between Francis I of France and Charles V.

Around 1550, Sailer was brought to court by imperial authorities for violating usury and monopoly laws. Due to his risky financial operations, his father-in-law forbade him in 1553 from disposing of his wife's inheritance, and Saint Gall deprived him of his citizenship the same year. Besides his residence in the Grottenau in Augsburg, he owned from 1549 the lordship of Pfersee outside the city, where he probably spent his final years.

Sailer died on 15 June 1559 in Augsburg.

== Bibliography ==
- Kellenbenz, Hermann: "Ein spanisches Jurogeschäft von Heinrich Ehinger und Hieronymus Sailer", in: Morsak, Louis C.; Escher, Markus (ed.): Festschrift für Louis Carlen zum 60. Geburtstag, 1989, pp. 101–118.
- Bonorand, Conradin: "Hieronymus Sailer aus St. Gallen, Schwiegersohn des Augsburger Grosskaufherrn Bartholomäus Welser, und seine Tätigkeit im Lichte des Briefwechsels mit Vadian", in: Zwingliana, 20, 1993, pp. 103–125.
- Kellenbenz, Hermann: "Hieronymus Sailer, 1495-1559, Faktor der Welser", in: Lebensbilder aus dem Bayerischen Schwaben, vol. 14, 1993, pp. 33–54.
- Häberlein, Mark: "Sailer, Hieronymus", in: Neue Deutsche Biographie, vol. 22, 2005, pp. 355–356.
- Krauer, Rezia; Stadelmann, Nicole et al. (ed.): Konquistadoren und Sklavenhändler vom Bodensee. Kolonialgeschichte im 16. Jahrhundert, 2024.
