= Claire Martin (meteorologist) =

British-Canadian meteorologist

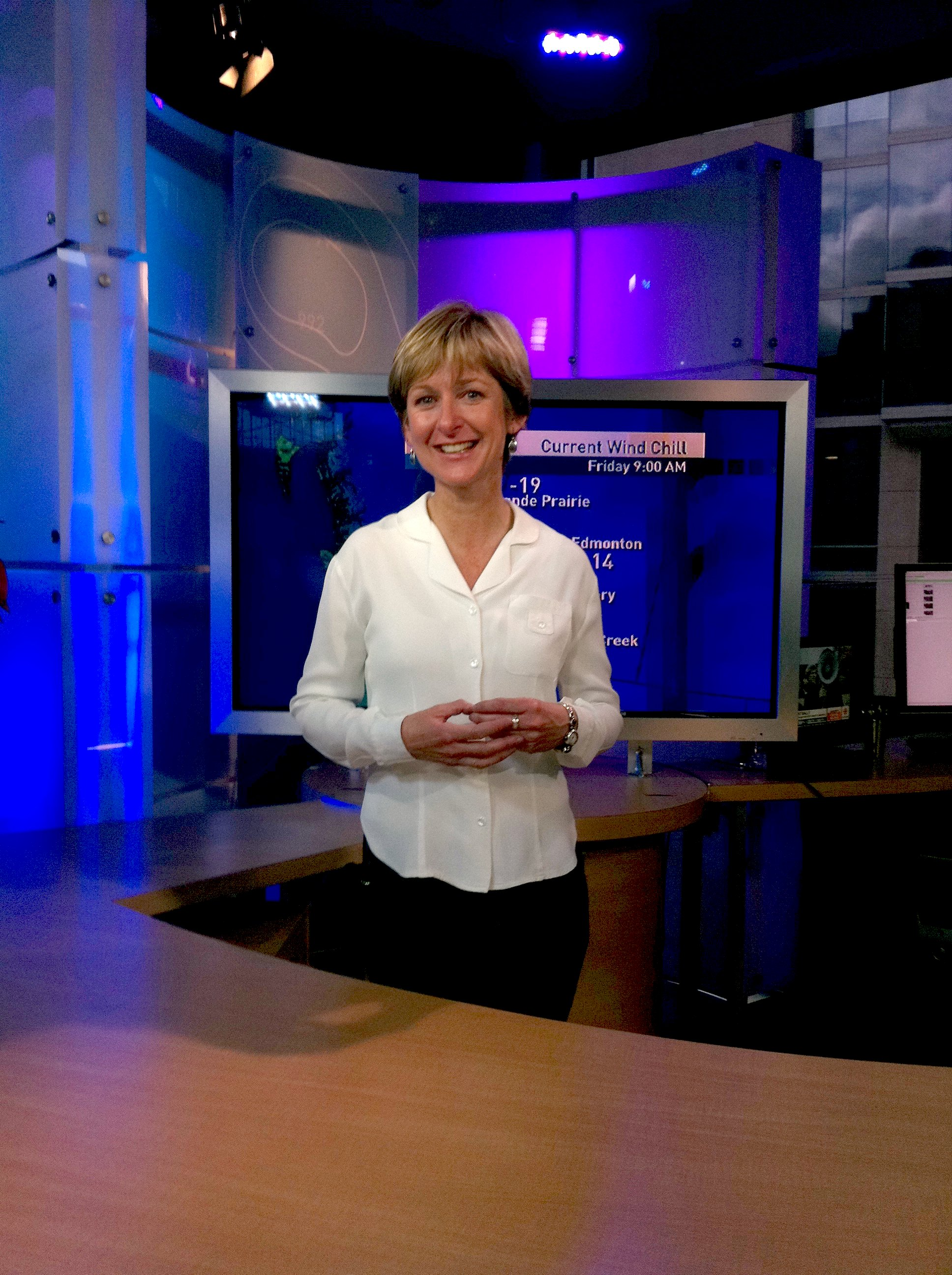
- Martin at a CBC open house in 2010.
- Education: Reading College, University of Alberta
- Occupation: Weather presenter, media executive, meteorologist
- Employer: Anaid Productions (2014–); CITV-DT (1996–2005); Canadian Broadcasting Corporation (2005–2014); Met Office (–1989); Meteorological Service of Canada (1990–1995)

Claire Martine Morehen is a former national television weather presenter with CBC Television in Canada. She is a niece of Barbara Edwards, who in 1974 became the BBC's first female weather presenter in the UK.

== Childhood ==
As a child, Martin appeared in the video for Pink Floyd's "Another Brick in the Wall (Part II)" but did not sing.

== Education and career ==
=== UK ===
Before emigrating to Canada, Martin worked for the UK Met Office as a forecaster, responsible for South West England. She received a Higher National Certificate with distinction in Mathematics, Statistics and Physics from the Reading College in the United Kingdom while on day release from her job. She was later transferred to the Central Forecast Office in Bracknell, UK

=== Canada ===
She moved to Canada in July 1990 and worked in a support position for Environment Canada's Meteorological Service of Canada (MSC) including positions as weather observer in Lethbridge, Alberta, and Fort Resolution, Northwest Territories. She attended the University of Alberta in Edmonton from 1993 until 1995, completing her Bachelor of Science with specialization in Meteorology. In March 1994, she graduated from the MSC Meteorology course. She worked on the "media bench" for Environment Canada's Northern Alberta Weather Centre.

She was identified as a surplus employee during the federal government cuts in 1995. Martin took a job as a staff meteorologist and weather presenter with CITV in Edmonton in August 1996. In 2005, she moved from Edmonton to join CBC Television's news operations in Toronto. CBC introduced nationally televised weather features at that time for its news programs The National and Canada Now. In 2007, she moved to CBC's Vancouver station CBUT to host regional weather forecasts. Martin was heavily involved in assisting with weather forecasts for the Vancouver Olympics in February 2010. In September 2012, the CBC senior management consolidated weather services, and moved Martin to CBLT in Toronto to work on the local supper-time and 10 PM national newscasts.

In February 2014, she left the CBC to move back to Vancouver and work for Anaid Productions.

== Professional involvement ==
She became a member of the Canadian Meteorological and Oceanographic Society (CMOS) in 1993, of the American Meteorological Society (AMS) in 1994, of the International Association of Broadcast Meteorology (IABM) in 1996, of the UK Royal Meteorological Society (RMetS) in 1998, and of the National Weather Association (NWA) in 1999. She was Chairman of the International Association of Broadcast Meteorology from 2007 to 2011, and is currently Vice-Chairman.

=== Awards and recognition ===
The International Weather Festival awarded Claire Martin the honour of "Best Weather Presenter in the World" in 2000, 2001 and 2003. The festival was produced annually by meteorologists and broadcast weather presenters from various nations and has been supported by the World Meteorological Organization.

The Canadian Meteorological and Oceanographic Society (CMOS) gave two citations to Claire Martin, one in 2011 for her excellence in producing Radio and Television Weather presentations especially hosting of two CBC Radio hour-long weather programming specials which were instrumental in educating the public in the science of meteorology and forecasting. In 2004 she received a CMOS citation for showing outstanding skills in bringing day-to-day weather and its impacts to people in a clear, simple and entertaining manner on Global TV in Edmonton AB.

== Entering into politics ==
Martin ran for election as the Green Party of Canada candidate for the riding of North Vancouver for the 42nd Canadian federal election which occurred on 19 October 2015. Martin challenged the seat held by Conservative MP Andrew Saxton. Martin came in third place, losing to Liberal candidate Jonathan Wilkinson, who won with over 50% of the vote.

2015 Canadian federal election: North Vancouver
Party	Candidate	Votes	%	±%	Expenditures
Liberal	Jonathan Wilkinson	36,458	56.65	+26.94	$148,944.98
Conservative	Andrew Saxton	17,301	26.88	–20.67	$149,776.24
Green	Claire Martin	5,350	8.31	+3.08	$134,934.59
New Democratic	Carleen Thomas	5,015	7.79	–9.06	$21,413.99
Libertarian	Ismet Yetisen	136	0.21	–	$22.40
Independent	Payam Azad	94	0.15	–	$1,942.47
Total valid votes/expense limit		64,354	99.66	–	$220,823.27
Total rejected ballots		218	0.34		
Turnout		64,572	75.77		
Eligible voters		85,219			
Liberal gain from Conservative		Swing		+23.80	
Source: Elections Canada
