= Grubel–Lloyd index =

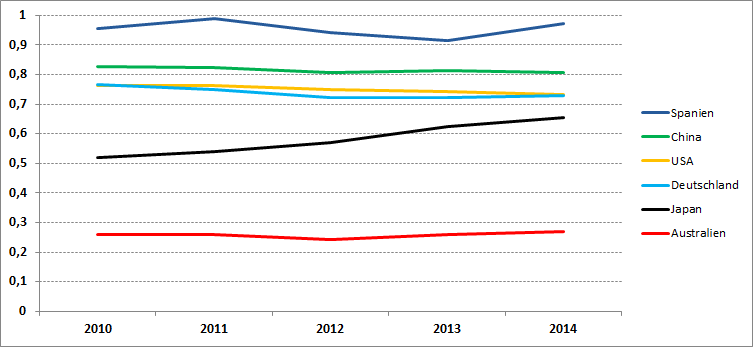
Grubel-Lloyd-Index

The Grubel–Lloyd index measures intra-industry trade of a particular product. It was introduced by Herb Grubel and Peter Lloyd in 1971.

$GL_i = \dfrac{(X_i + M_i) - \left| X_i - M_i \right|}{X_i + M_i} = 1 - \dfrac{\left| X_i - M_i \right|}{X_i + M_i} \qquad ;\ 0 \leq GL_i \leq 1$

where X_{i} denotes the export, M_{i} the import of good i.

If GL_{i} = 1, there is a good level of intra-industry trade. This means for example the Country in consideration Exports the same quantity of good i as much as it Imports. Conversely, if GL_{i} = 0, there is no intra-industry trade at all. This would mean that the Country in consideration only either Exports or only Imports good i.
