= Herb Grubel =

Canadian politician (1934–2026)

Member of the Canadian Parliament for Capilano—Howe Sound
- In office 1993–1997
- Preceded by: Mary Collins
- Succeeded by: riding abolished

Personal details
- Born: February 26, 1934 Frankfurt, Germany
- Died: November 2, 2026 (aged 92)
- Party: Reform Party of Canada
- Spouse: Helene Bertrand
- Children: 2

Herbert Gunter Grubel (February 26, 1934 – November 2, 2026) was a Canadian academic, economist, writer and politician. He was professor of economics at Simon Fraser University and a senior fellow at the Fraser Institute.

== Early life and education ==
Grubel was born in Frankfurt, Germany, on February 26, 1934. He migrated to the United States in 1956 and to Canada in 1972.

He graduated from a Gymnasium in Frankfurt, Germany (1954), from Rutgers University with a B.A. (1958) and from Yale University with a Ph.D. in economics (1963).

== Academic career ==
Grubel served full-time on the faculties of Yale University (1961–1962), Stanford University (1962–1963), University of Chicago (1963–1966), the University of Pennsylvania Wharton School (1966–1971), and Simon Fraser University (1972–1999).

He also held temporary positions at the following institutions: the Australian National University as Research Fellow (1969); the U.S. Treasury, International Division, as Senior Policy Analyst (1971); Nuffield College, Oxford as Visiting Research Fellow (1974–1975); the University of Nairobi in Kenya as CIDA Visiting Professor (1978–1979); the University of Cape Town as Visiting Professor (February–June 1984, April–May 1989); the Institute of Southeast Asian Studies in Singapore as Distinguished Fellow in International Banking and Finance (Fall 1985); Bundesbank Visiting Professor of International Finance at the Free University of Berlin (Summer Semester 1990); and holder of the Agip Chair in International Economics at the Johns Hopkins School of Advanced International Studies in Bologna, Italy (Spring Semester 2008).

== Political career ==
As a member of the Reform Party, Grubel defeated former federal cabinet minister Mary Collins in the 1993 election, pushing her into third place. He served as the party's finance critic from 1995 to 1997, and was controversial for his outspoken support of Canada moving toward a flat tax system.

Grubel did not run in the 1997 election. As of 2011 he was professor emeritus of economics at Simon Fraser University and senior fellow of the Fraser Institute. He has also worked at the economic faculties of Yale, Stanford, the University of Chicago and the University of Pennsylvania.

== Personal life and death ==
Grubel had two children, Eric and Heidi and five grandchildren. He was married to Helene Bertrand.

Grubel died on November 2, 2026, at the age of 92.

== Publications ==
Grubel published 27 books and more than 130 professional articles in economics, dealing with international trade and finance and a wide range of economic policy issues. His areas of research include the economics of monetary union and the economics and politics of Canadian immigration. One of his most important contributions to international economics is the Grubel–Lloyd index, which measures intra-industry trade of a particular product. While at the Fraser Institute Herbert published a paper titled: "The Case for the Amero: The Economics and Politics of a North American Monetary Union", in which he proposed that Canada and the USA adopt a shared currency called the 'amero'.

=== Selected publications ===
- Forward Exchange, Speculation and the International Flow of Capital. Stanford University Press, 1966.
- The International Monetary System. Penguin Modern Economics, London, 1969; Baltimore, 1970; revised edition, London, 1972; third and Spanish editions, 1977; fourth edition, 1984.
- Intra-Industry Trade: The Theory and Measurement of International Trade in Differentiated Products (with P. J. Lloyd). Macmillan: London; Wiley: New York, 1975.
- International Economics. Irwin: Homewood, Illinois, 1977; second edition, 1981; Japanese edition, 1980.
- Brain Drain: Determinants, Measurement and Welfare Effects (with A. D. Scott). Wilfrid Laurier University Press, Waterloo, Ontario, 1977.
- The Real Cost of the B.C. Milk Board (with R. Schwindt). The Fraser Institute, Vancouver, 1977.
- Free Market Zones: Deregulating Canadian Enterprise. The Fraser Institute, Vancouver, 1983.
