= Barbara Edwards (meteorologist) =

English meteorologist (born 1939)

Barbara Edwards (born 1939) is an English meteorologist who became the BBC's first female television weather presenter in January 1974.

She joined the Met Office in 1957 where she edited and published meteorological publications, until 1962. She worked as a weather forecaster at Gatwick Airport and Heathrow Airport from 1963 to 1970, when she moved to the London Weather Centre working on forecasting for commerce and industry.

She also presented weather reports on BBC Radio from 1970 to 1974, as well as doing continuity announcements on BBC Radio 4 from 1972. She most famously appeared from January 1974 until June 1978 on BBC Television, joining around the same time as the far longer-serving Michael Fish. During this period she is said to have disliked the criticism of her dress sense, which the male members of the team did not have to contend with, but was no doubt accentuated by being the first woman in the role. In this, her career route to television presentation through being a professional meteorologist clearly contrasts with subsequent stereotypes of a 'weather girl'.

Edwards initially enjoyed being recognised in public, but the shine soon wore off. "Some people love publicity and like to be recognised and would hate it if they weren't," she said in a BBC interview. "But until it happens to you I don't think you know, and I found out that I didn't enjoy it and I wanted my privacy and there's no way you can have it if you're on television, privacy just goes out the window. I just couldn't accept that." She also found the job a rather lonely one. "You were just this one Met Office person at Television Centre in a little office all on your own, and the few people you get to know in the studio, you found when you were free they were busy, and you'd go down to the canteen and have your lunch, usually alone."

Due to frustration at the public criticism of her dress sense, which the male forecasters escaped, Edwards retreated to presenting on the radio.

Edwards married Kenneth Watson in 1976. She is the aunt of expatriate Claire Martin, who presented weather forecasts nationally in Canada on CBC Television. In 2014, she told the BBC that since leaving the Met Office, she had been working part-time in a university library.

In 2024, The Royal Mail released a stamp honouring Edwards.
