= Sebastian Grübel =

Swiss humanist (c. 1529–1595)

- Born: c. 1529; St. Gallen, Old Swiss Confederacy
- Died: 17 October 1595; Schaffhausen, Old Swiss Confederacy
- Occupation: Schoolmaster
- Spouses: Verena Pflum (m. 1556) Gertrud Eck (m. 1575)
- Parents: Sebastian Grübel (father); Waldburg (Waldburga) Rudolf (mother)

Sebastian Grübel (c. 1529 – 17 October 1595) was a Swiss humanist and schoolmaster. From 1552 to 1575 he was master of the Latin school in Schaffhausen, where he repeatedly staged plays with his pupils, and from 1587 to 1595 he was the administrator of Paradies Monastery. His translation and adaptation of Rudolf Gwalther's play Nabal was printed in Mulhouse in 1560.

== Biography ==
Sebastian Grübel was born around 1529 in St. Gallen, the son of Sebastian Grübel, a pastor and master of the liberal arts (Magister der freien Künste), and Waldburg (or Waldburga) Rudolf. In 1556 he married Verena Pflum, and in 1575 he married Gertrud Eck of Mulhouse.

Grübel studied in Zurich, Basel and Lausanne. In 1552 he became master of the Latin school (Lateinschulmeister) in Schaffhausen. In 1575 he was dismissed because of a lapse (fornicatio). From 1587 to 1595 he was the administrator (Amtmann) of Paradies Monastery.

A humanist and an expert on Terence, Grübel repeatedly staged plays with his pupils, among them Rudolf Gwalther's Nabal in 1559, an Immolation Isaaks (Sacrifice of Isaac) in 1566 and the play Hiob (Job) in 1574. His translation and adaptation of Nabal, a considerable expansion of Gwalther's version, is regarded as clumsy in its language and coarse in a popular way (volkstümlich-derb). It was printed in Mulhouse in 1560. Grübel died in Schaffhausen on 17 October 1595.

== Bibliography ==
- A. Steinegger, "Das Theater im alten Schaffhausen", in Schaffhauser Beiträge zur Geschichte 13, 1936, 32–59
- S. Giovanoli, Rudolf Gwalthers Nabal, 1979, 197–347
- M. Witkowska, Das neulateinische Schuldrama "Nabal" von Rudolf Gwalther und seine deutschen Fassungen, 1987, 263–264, 364–373, 391–399
- R. Hasler, Die Scheibenriss-Sammlung Wyss, 2, 1997, 139
