= Green Party of Canada candidates in the 2015 Canadian federal election =

This is a list of candidates for the Green Party of Canada in the 2015 Canadian federal election. The Green Party nominated candidates in all 338 ridings.

== Candidate statistics ==
Candidates Nominated	Male Candidates	Female Candidates	Most Common Occupation	
174	114	60	Education	9

== Newfoundland and Labrador - 7 seats ==
Riding	Candidate's Name	Notes	Gender	Residence	Occupation	Votes	%	Rank
Avalon	Krista Byrne-Puumala		F	St. John's	Environmental consultant	228	0.54%	5th
Bonavista—Burin—Trinity	Tyler Colbourne	The Governor General of Canada Sovereign's Medal for Volunteers awarded on March 12, 2015	M		Tourism, Community Development	297	0.85%	4th
Coast of Bays—Central—Notre Dame	Elizabeth Perry		F		Educator, Businesswoman	271	0.76%	4th
Labrador	Mary Lou Harley	Harley was announced on the party's website as the candidate for Labrador but did not register with Elections Canada.	F		Retired Environmental consultant and educator	n/a	n/a	n/a
Long Range Mountains	Terry Cormier	Director of International Crime and Terrorism with the Department of Foreign Affairs (1999–2004)	M	Corner Brook	Retired Federal Civil Servant	1,111	2.66%	4th
St. John's East	David Peters		M	St. John's	Musician	500	1.11%	4th
St. John's South—Mount Pearl	Jackson McLean		M	St. John's	Assistant Manager at The Seed Company	365	0.81%	4th

== Prince Edward Island - 4 seats ==
Riding	Candidate's Name	Notes	Gender	Residence	Occupation	Votes	%	Rank
Cardigan	Teresa Doyle		F		Musician	1,434	6.38%	4th
Charlottetown	Rebecca Viau		F	Charlottetown	Artist	1,222	5.77%	4th
Egmont	Nils Ling		M	Breadalbane	Author, Playwright, actor, filmmaker, Newspaper Columnist	559	2.62%	4th
Malpeque	Lynne Lund		F	Clinton	Businesswoman	2,066	9.19%	4th

== Nova Scotia - 11 seats ==
Riding	Candidate's Name	Notes	Gender	Residence	Occupation	Votes	%	Rank
Cape Breton—Canso	Maria Coady		F	North East Margaree	Former MLA Candidate, Retired Campaign Manager	1,281	2.96%	4th
Central Nova	David Hachey		M	Meadowville	Farmer	1,834	4.14%	4th
Cumberland—Colchester	Jason Blanch		M	Cumberland County	Counsellor, farmer	1,650	3.56%	4th
Dartmouth—Cole Harbour	Brynn Nheiley		F	Halifax	Architect	1,775	3.40%	4th
Halifax	Thomas Trappenberg	2011 and 2006 candidate in Halifax West	M	Hatchet Lake	Professor, Dalhousie University	1,745	3.26%	4th
Halifax West	Richard Zurawski	PhD Candidate in Education	M		Part-time Faculty Member and Lecturer at MSVU, Radio Talk Show Host	1,971	3.94%	4th
Kings—Hants	Will Cooper		M			1,569	3.36%	4th
Sackville—Preston—Chezzetcook	Mike Montgomery		M	Lower Sackville	Entrepreneur	1,341	2.78%	4th
South Shore—St. Margaret's	Richard Biggar		M			1,534	2.91%	4th
Sydney—Victoria	Adrianna MacKinnon		F			1,026	2.50%	4th
West Nova	Clark Walton		M	Paradise		1,904	4.17%	4th

== New Brunswick - 10 seats ==
Riding	Candidate's Name	Notes	Gender	Residence	Occupation	Votes	%	Rank
Acadie—Bathurst	Dominique Breau		M	Pont-Landry	Writer	1,187	2.33%	4th
Beauséjour	Kevin King		M	Ammon		2,376	4.49%	4th
Fredericton	Mary Lou Babineau	2008 candidate in this riding	F	Fredericton	Professor	5,804	12.42%	3rd
Fundy Royal	Stephanie Coburn	2014 New Brunswick provincial candidate for Sussex-Fundy-St. Martins	F			1,823	3.89%	4th
Madawaska—Restigouche	Françoise Aubin	Founding Vice-president Francophone for the Green Party of New Brunswick	F		New Brunswick representative on the Green Party of Canada Federal Council	707	1.90%	4th
Miramichi—Grand Lake	Matthew Clark	2014 New Brunswick provincial candidate for Moncton East	M	Moncton		1,098	3.02%	4th
Moncton—Riverview—Dieppe	Luc Melanson		M	Dieppe		2,399	4.61%	4th
New Brunswick Southwest	Gayla MacIntosh	2014 New Brunswick provincial candidate for Fredericton West-Hanwell	F	Fredericton	Community advocate	1,877	4.95%	4th
Saint John—Rothesay	Sharon Murphy	2014 New Brunswick provincial candidate for Saint John East	F	Saint John	Businesswoman	1,321	3.12%	4th
Tobique—Mactaquac	Terry Wishart	2014 New Brunswick provincial candidate for Carleton-York	M			1,959	5.10%	4th

== Quebec - 78 seats ==
Riding	Candidate's Name	Notes	Gender	Residence	Occupation	Votes	%	Rank
Abitibi—Baie-James—Nunavik—Eeyou	Patrick Benoît		M			779	2.26%	5th
Abitibi—Témiscamingue	Aline Bégin		F	Gatineau		859	1.73%	5th
Ahuntsic-Cartierville	Gilles Mercier		M	Montreal		1,175	2.1%	5th
Alfred-Pellan	Lynda Briguene		F	Laval		1,089	1.97%	5th
Argenteuil—La Petite-Nation	Audrey Lamarche		F	Gatineau		1,118	2.19%	5th
Avignon—La Mitis—Matane—Matapédia	Sherri Springle		F			365	1.0%	6th
Beauce	Céline Brown MacDonald		F			943	1.69%	5th
Beauport—Côte-de-Beaupré—Île d’Orléans—Charlevoix	Patrick Kerr		M			859	1.7%	5th
Beauport—Limoilou	Dalila Elhak		F			1,220	2.41%	5th
Bécancour—Nicolet—Saurel	Claude Poudrier		M			1,182	2.26%	5th
Bellechasse—Les Etchemins—Lévis	André Bélisle		M	Frampton	Environment activist	2,032	3.25%	5th
Beloeil—Chambly	Fodé Kerfalla Yansané	2013 Chambly Municipal Election Candidate	M	Chambly	City planner	1,498	2.25%	5th
Berthier—Maskinongé	Victoria Cate May Burton		F			847	1.56%	5th
Bourassa	Maxime Charron		M			886	2.15%	5th
Brome—Missisquoi	Cindy Moynan		F			1,377	2.35%	5th
Brossard—Saint-Lambert	Fang Hu		M	Brossard		1,089	1.9%	5th
Charlesbourg—Haute-Saint-Charles	Nathalie Baudet		F			1,256	2.16%	5th
Châteauguay—Lacolle	Jency Mercier	Mercier had previously sought election for borough mayor of Verdun in the 2013 Montreal municipal election as a candidate of the Intégrité Montréal party	F	Verdun	STM driver	982	1.9%	5th
Chicoutimi—Le Fjord	Dany St-Gelais		M			907	2.07%	5th
Compton—Stanstead	Korie Marshall		F			1,085	1.94%	5th
Dorval—Lachine—LaSalle	Vincent Carbonneau		M			1,245	2.28%	5th
Drummond	Émile Coderre		M			1,270	2.4%	5th
Gaspésie—Les Îles-de-la-Madeleine	Jim Morrison		M			400	1.01%	5th
Gatineau	Guy Dostaler		M			942	1.63%	5th
Hochelaga	Anne-Marie Saint-Cerny		F	Val-David	Political activist	1,654	3.19%	5th
Honoré-Mercier	Angela Budilean		F			814	1.58%	5th
Hull—Aylmer	Roger Fleury		M			1,035	1.87%	5th
Joliette	Mathieu Morin		M			1,335	2.35%	5th
Jonquière	Carmen Budilean		F			656	1.36%	5th
La Pointe-de-l'Île	David Cox		M			1,130	2.05%	5th
La Prairie	Joanne Tomas		F			1,235	2.15%	5th
Lac-Saint-Jean	Laurence Requilé		F			806	1.46%	5th
Lac-Saint-Louis	Bradford Dean		M			1,812	2.91%	4th
LaSalle—Émard—Verdun	Lorraine Banville		F	Montreal	Marine biologist	1,717	3.19%	5th
Laurentides—Labelle	Niloufar Hedjazi		F			1,251	1.98%	5th
Laurier—Sainte-Marie	Cyrille Giraud		M	Montreal	Financial securities	1,904	3.48%	5th
Laval—Les Îles	Faiza R'Guiba		F			919	1.69%	5th
Lévis—Lotbinière	Tina Biello		F			1,124	1.8%	5th
Longueuil—Charles-LeMoyne	Mario Leclerc		M			1,510	2.92%	5th
Longueuil—Saint-Hubert	Casandra Poitras	Youngest Canadian ever to be candidate	F	Longueuil	Student	1,447	2.49%	5th
Louis-Hébert	Andrée-Anne Beaudoin-Julien		F			1,561	2.53%	5th
Louis-Saint-Laurent	Michel Savard		M			1,210	1.87%	5th
Manicouagan	Jacques Gélineau		M			1,293	3.2%	5th
Marc-Aurèle-Fortin	Lorna Mungur		F			1,057	1.94%	5th
Mégantic—L'Érable	Nicole Charette		F			1,258	2.6%	5th
Mirabel	Jocelyn Gifford		F			1,301	2.19%	5th
Montarville	Olivier Adam		M			1,388	2.4%	5th
Montcalm	Yumi Yow Mei Ang		F			976	1.84%	5th
Montmagny—L'Islet—Kamouraska—Rivière-du-Loup	Chantal Breton		F			823	1.67%	5th
Mount Royal	Tim Landry		M			747	1.55%	5th
Notre-Dame-de-Grâce—Westmount	Melissa Kate Wheeler		F			1,581	3.06%	4th
Outremont	Amara Diallo		M	Montreal		1,575	3.61%	5th
Papineau	Danny Polifroni		M	Montreal	Engineer	1,443	2.84%	5th
Pierre-Boucher—Les Patriotes—Verchères	JiCi Lauzon		M	Boucherville	Actor, comedian	5,056	8.51%	5th
Pierrefonds—Dollard	Abraham Weizfeld		M	Montreal	Peace activist	865	1.48%	5th
Pontiac	Colin Griffiths		M	Gatineau	Retired	1,096	1.74%	5th
Portneuf—Jacques-Cartier	Johanne Morin		F			1,096	1.77%	5th
Québec	Philippe Riboty		M			1,570	2.91%	5th
Repentigny	Yoland Gilbert		M			1,242	1.9%	6th
Richmond—Arthabaska	Laurier Busque		M			984	1.68%	5th
Rimouski-Neigette—Témiscouata—Les Basques	Louise Boutin		F			669	1.49%	5th
Rivière-des-Mille-Îles	Alec Ware		M	Deux-Montagnes	Nurse	1,136	1.96%	5th
Rivière-du-Nord	Joey Leckman		M	Prévost	Teacher	1,436	2.53%	5th
Rosemont—La Petite-Patrie	Sameer Muldeen		M	Montreal		1,787	3.06%	5th
Saint-Hyacinthe—Bagot	Lise Durand		F			1,243	2.3%	5th
Saint-Jean	Marilyn Redivo		F			1,281	2.12%	5th
Saint-Laurent	John Tromp		M			977	2.42%	5th
Saint-Léonard—Saint-Michel	Melissa Miscione		F	Montreal	Interior designer	805	1.81%	5th
Saint-Maurice—Champlain	Martial Toupin		M			1,144	1.94%	5th
Salaberry—Suroît	Silverado Socrates		F			867	1.41%	5th
Shefford	Simon McMillan		M			1,397	2.37%	5th
Sherbrooke	Sophie Malouin		F			1,143	1.2%	5th
Terrebonne	Susan Moen		F			1,016	1.74%	5th
Thérèse-De Blainville	Andrew Carkner		M			1,352	2.4%	5th
Trois-Rivières	Éric Trottier		M			1,032	1.71%	5th
Vaudreuil—Soulanges	Jennifer Kaszel		F			1,445	2.21%	5th
Ville-Marie—Le Sud-Ouest—Île-des-Soeurs	Daniel Green	Deputy Leader of the Green Party of Canada	M	Hampstead	Environmentalist	2,398	4.78%	5th
Vimy	José Núñez-Melo	Incumbent Member of Parliament for Laval	M	Laval	Manager, public servant, publisher	1,280	2.36%	5th

== Ontario - 121 seats ==
Riding	Candidate's Name	Notes	Gender	Residence	Occupation	Votes	%	Rank
Ajax	Jeff Hill		M			788	1.40%	4th
Algoma—Manitoulin—Kapuskasing	Calvin John Orok		M			927	2.24%	4th
Aurora—Oak Ridges—Richmond Hill	Randi Ramdeen		F			654	1.28%	4th
Barrie—Innisfil	Bonnie North	2014 Ontario provincial candidate for Barrie	F	Barrie	Nutritionist	1,991	4.04%	4th
Barrie—Springwater—Oro-Medonte	Marty Lancaster	Former Oro-Medonte Township Councillor for Ward 3	M	Shanty Bay	Teacher	2,648	5.24%	4th
Bay of Quinte	Rachel Nelems		F			1,278	2.21%	4th
Beaches—East York	Randall Sach		M			1,433	2.58%	4th
Brampton Centre	Saul Marquard T. Bottcher		M			844	2.13%	4th
Brampton East	Kyle Lacroix		M			512	1.13%	4th
Brampton North	Pauline Thornham		F			915	1.90%	4th
Brampton South	Shaun Hatton		M			1,011	2.22%	4th
Brampton West	Karthika Gobinath		F			674	1.55%	4th
Brantford—Brant	Kevin Brandt	2014 Brantford City Council candidate for Ward 5	M	Brantford	Optometric Technician	1,582	2.50%	4th
Bruce—Grey—Owen Sound	Chris Albinati		M			1,887	3.3%	4th
Burlington	Vince Fiorito		M			1,710	2.44%	4th
Cambridge	Michele Braniff		F	Cambridge	Lawyer, Educator	1,723	3.23%	4th
Carleton	Deborah Coyne		F	Ottawa	Lawyer, professor, author	1,932	3.26%	4th
Chatham-Kent—Leamington	Mark Vercouteren		M			1,394	2.68%	4th
Davenport	Dan Stein		M			1,530	3.09%	4th
Don Valley East	Laura Elizabeth Sanderson		F			1,078	2.59%	4th
Don Valley North	Caroline Brown		F			1,018	2.23%	4th
Don Valley West	Natalie Hunt		F			848	1.66%	4th
Dufferin—Caledon	Nancy Urekar		F	Caledon	Small Business Owner, MBA	4,433	7.33%	3rd
Durham	Stacey Leadbetter		F			1,616	2.52%	4th
Eglinton—Lawrence	Matthew Chisholm		F			799	1.43%	4th
Elgin—Middlesex—London	Bronagh Joyce Morgan		F			1,783	3.13%	4th
Essex	Jennifer Alderson		F			1,141	1.88%	4th
Etobicoke Centre	Shawn Rizvi		M	Etobicoke	Management consultant	856	1.39%	4th
Etobicoke North	Akhtar Ayub	2014 Toronto City Council candidate for Ward 1 (Etobicoke North)	M	Etobicoke	Service consultant	524	1.25%	4th
Etobicoke—Lakeshore	Angela Salewsky		F			1,507	2.34%	4th
Flamborough—Glanbrook	David Urquhart		M	Hamilton	Retired steel company supervisor	1,866	3.36%	4th
Glengarry—Prescott—Russell	Genevieve Malouin-Diraddo		F			1,153	1.80%	4th
Guelph	Gord Miller	Ontario Environmental Commissioner for past 15 years	M		Scientist	7,909	11.32%	4th
Haldimand—Norfolk	Wayne Ettinger		M	Dunnville	Transportation	1,857	3.32%	4th
Haliburton—Kawartha Lakes—Brock	William MacCallum		M	Omemee	Teacher	2,470	3.99%	4th
Hamilton Centre	Ute Schmid-Jones		F	Hamilton	Hypnotherapist	1,778	4.33%	4th
Hamilton East—Stoney Creek	Erin Davis		F		Community garden creative director	1,305	2.59%	4th
Hamilton Mountain	Raheem Aman		M	Hamilton	University student	1,283	2.54%	4th
Hamilton West—Ancaster—Dundas	Peter Ormond	2014 Ontario provincial candidate for Hamilton Centre	M	Hamilton	Green energy efficiency expert	2,633	4.23%	4th
Hastings—Lennox and Addington	Cameron Mather	2014 Ontario provincial candidate for Lanark—Frontenac—Lennox and Addington	M	Tamworth	Publisher	1,466	2.94%	4th
Humber River—Black Creek	Keith Jarrett		M			584	1.63%	4th
Huron—Bruce	Jutta Splettstoesser		F			1,398	2.40%	4th
Kanata—Carleton	Andrew West	2014 Ontario provincial candidate for Carleton—Mississippi Mills	M	Kanata	Lawyer	1,704	2.69%	4th
Kenora	Ember McKillop		F	Dryden	Teacher	501	1.63%	4th
King—Vaughan	Ann Raney		F	King City	Consultant	1,037	1.90%	4th
Kingston and the Islands	Nathan Townend		M	Kingston	Union representative	2,933	4.46%	4th
Kitchener Centre	Nicholas Wendler		M	Kitchener		1,597	3.05%	4th
Kitchener—Conestoga	Bob Jonkman		M	Elmira	Computer Consultant	1,314	2.75%	4th
Kitchener South—Hespeler	David Weber	2014 Ontario provincial candidate for Kitchener—Conestoga	M	Kitchener	Police officer	1,767	3.69%	4th
Lambton—Kent—Middlesex	Jim Johnston	2011, 2008 and 2006 candidate in this riding	M	Ilderton	Professor	1,873	3.32%	4th
Lanark—Frontenac—Kingston	Anita Payne	2014 Ontario provincial candidate for Prince Edward—Hastings, 2011 Ontario provincial candidate for Haliburton—Kawartha Lakes—Brock and 2007 Ontario provincial candidate for Perth—Wellington	F	Perth	Retired teacher	2,025	3.54%	4th
Leeds—Grenville—Thousand Islands and Rideau Lakes	Lorraine Rekmans	2011 and 2008 candidate in Algoma—Manitoulin—Kapuskasing	F	Osgoode	Journalist	859	2.95%	4th
London—Fanshawe	Matthew Peloza		M	London	Accountant	1,604	2.93%	4th
London North Centre	Carol Dyck		F	London	Environmental consultant	2,286	3.56%	4th
London West	Dimitri Lascaris		M	London	Lawyer	1,918	2.82%	4th
Markham—Stouffville	Myles O'Brien	2014 Ontario provincial candidate for Markham—Unionville	M	Stouffville	Public servant	1,145	1.92%	4th
Markham—Thornhill	Joshua Russell		M			535	1.25%	4th
Markham—Unionville	Elvin Kao		M	Markham	Marketing	1,110	2.23%	4th
Milton	Mini Batra		F	Milton	IT technologist	1,131	2.29%	4th
Mississauga Centre	Linh Nguyen	2014 Ontario provincial candidate for Mississauga East—Cooksville	F	Mississauga	Public servant	1,129	2.18%	4th
Mississauga East—Cooksville	Jaymini Bhikha	2011 candidate for the riding	F		Ottawa's Executive assistant to Elizabeth May	766	1.48%	4th
Mississauga—Erin Mills	Andrew Roblin	2014 Ontario provincial candidate for Newmarket—Aurora	M	Aurora	Student	905	1.64%	4th
Mississauga—Lakeshore	Ariana Burgener		F			1,397	2.36%	4th
Mississauga—Malton	Heather Mercer		F			737	1.67%	4th
Mississauga—Streetsville	Christopher Hill	2011 candidate in this riding	M	Mississauga	Manager	1,293	2.31%	4th
Nepean	Jean-Luc Cooke	2011 candidate in Nepean—Carleton	M	Ottawa	IT consultant	1,513	2.33%	4th
Newmarket—Aurora	Vanessa Long	2011 candidate in this riding	F	Newmarket	Personal trainer	1,331	2.36%	4th
Niagara Centre	David Clow		M			1,316	2.41%	4th
Niagara Falls	Steven Soos		M			1,633	2.52%	4th
Niagara West	Sid Frere		M	West Lincoln		1,511	2.98%	4th
Nickel Belt	Stuart McCall		M			1,217	2.48%	4th
Nipissing—Timiskaming	Nicole Peltier		F			1,257	2.57%	4th
Northumberland—Peterborough South	Patricia Sinnott	2014 and 2010 Port Hope City Council candidate for Ward 1	F	Port Hope	Retired hospital pharmacist	1,990	3.13%	4th
Oakville	David Doel		M			1,420	2.19%	4th
Oakville North—Burlington	Adnan Shahbaz		M	Burlington	Educator	968	1.60%	4th
Orléans	Raphaël Morin		M			1,410	1.81%	4th
Oshawa	Michael Dempsey		M	Oshawa	Construction	1,522	2.51%	4th
Ottawa Centre	Tom Milroy		M			2,246	2.97%	4th
Ottawa South	John Redins	2014, 2013 by-election and 2011 Ontario Special Needs provincial candidate in this riding.	M	Ottawa	Cashier	1,888	2.92%	4th
Ottawa—Vanier	Nira Dookeran		F		Teacher	987	3.33%	4th
Ottawa West—Nepean	Mark Brooks		M			1,772	2.80%	4th
Oxford	Mike Farlow		M			2,004	3.50%	4th
Parkdale—High Park	Adam Phipps		M			1,743	2.98%	4th
Parry Sound-Muskoka	Glen Hodgson		M			3,704	7.22%	4th
Perth Wellington	Cody Sebben	2014 Stratford City Council Candidate	M	Stratford	Rehabilitation worker			
Peterborough—Kawartha								
Pickering—Uxbridge	Anthony Navarro	2014 Ontario provincial candidate for Pickering—Scarborough East	M	Pickering	IT technician			
Renfrew—Nipissing—Pembroke								
Richmond Hill								
St. Catharines								
Sarnia—Lambton	Peter R. Smith		M	Bright's Grove	Retired			
Sault Ste. Marie								
Scarborough Centre								
Scarborough North	Eleni MacDonald		F					
Scarborough Southwest								
Scarborough—Agincourt								
Scarborough-Guildwood								
Scarborough—Rouge Park								
Simcoe—Grey								
Simcoe North								
Spadina—Fort York								
Stormont—Dundas—South Glengarry	Elaine Kennedy	2007 Ontario provincial candidate for this riding	F	St. Andrews West	Teacher			
Sudbury	David Robinson	2015 Ontario by-election candidate for this riding	F	Sudbury	Professor			
Thornhill								
Thunder Bay—Rainy River	Christy Radbourne		F	Thunder Bay	School principal			
Thunder Bay—Superior North	Bruce Hyer	Incumbent Member of Parliament	M	Thunder Bay	Ecologist, businessman			
Timmins-James Bay	Max Kennedy		M	Englehart	Environmental toxicologist			
Toronto Centre								
Toronto—Danforth	Chris Tolley		M	Toronto	Theatre director			
Toronto—St. Paul's								
University—Rosedale	Nick Wright	Former leader of the Nova Scotia Green Party	M	Toronto	Lawyer			
Vaughan—Woodbridge								
Waterloo	Richard Walsh	2011 Independent and 2000 NDP candidate in Kitchener—Waterloo, 2006 and 2004 NDP candidate in Kitchener Centre	M	Waterloo	Professor	1,713	2.9%	4th
Wellington—Halton Hills	Brent Bouteiller	2011, 2008, 2006 and 2004 candidate in this riding, 2000 candidate in Waterloo—Wellington.	M	Fergus	Civil engineer			
Whitby	Craig Cameron	2014 by-election candidate in Whitby—Oshawa	M	Whitby	Academic advisor			
Willowdale								
Windsor—Tecumseh								
Windsor West								
York Centre	Constantine Kritsonis	Candidate in York Centre 1997, 2000, 2004, 2006. Green party of Ontario candidate in Oakwood 1995.	M					
York—Simcoe								
York South—Weston								

== Manitoba - 14 seats ==
Riding	Candidate's Name	Notes	Gender	Residence	Occupation	Votes	%	Rank
Brandon—Souris	David Neufeld	2013 by-election candidate in this riding	M	Boissevain	Farmer	2,526	6.15%	4th
Charleswood—St. James—Assiniboia—Headingley	Kevin Nichols		M	Winnipeg	Safety technician	1,376	2.92%	4th
Churchill—Keewatinook Aski	August Hastmann		M	Beausejour		537	1.79%	4th
Dauphin—Swan River—Neepawa	Katharine Storey	2011, 2008, 2006 general election and 2010 by-election candidate in Dauphin—Swan River—Marquette	F	Grandview	Farmer	1,592	3.83%	5th
Elmwood—Transcona	Kim Parke		F	Winnipeg	Manager at Real Canadian Superstore	1,016	2.36%	4th
Kildonan—St. Paul	Steven Stairs		M			783	1.78%	4th
Portage—Lisgar	Bev Eert		F	Rossendale	Retired	1,637	3.97%	4th
Provencher	Jeff Wheeldon	CEO of Green Party Provencher Riding Association	M	Otterburne	Registrar	1,779	3.98%	4th
Saint Boniface—Saint Vital	Glenn Zaretski		M	Winnipeg	Musician	1,119	2.29%	4th
Selkirk—Interlake—Eastman	Wayne James		M	Near Beausejour	Organic Farmer	1,707	3.46%	4th
Winnipeg Centre	Don Woodstock					1,379	4.07%	4th
Winnipeg North	John Redekopp	2011 Manitoba provincial candidate for The Maples	M	Winnipeg	Accountant	826	2.43%	4th
Winnipeg South	Adam Smith		M	Winnipeg	Rehabilitative Care Manager	990	2.05%	4th
Winnipeg South Centre	Andrew Park	Winnipeg South Centre Green Party Electoral District Association President	M	Winnipeg	Biologist	1,677	3.13%	4th

== Saskatchewan - 14 seats ==
Riding	Candidate's Name	Notes	Gender	Residence	Occupation	Votes	%	Rank
Battlefords—Lloydminster	Mikaela Tenkink		F	Prince Albert	Fiber Artist, Entrepreneur	575	1.71%	5th
Carlton Trail—Eagle Creek	Lynn Oliphant		M		Retired Professor	902	2.24%	4th
Cypress Hills—Grasslands	William Caton		M		Cattle Rancher	993	2.74%	4th
Desnethé—Missinippi—Churchill River	Warren Koch		M		Registered Nurse, Psychiatric Nurse	552	1.83%	4th
Moose Jaw—Lake Centre—Lanigan	Shawn Setyo		M			961	2.29%	4th
Prince Albert	Byron Tenkink		M			761	1.93%	4th
Regina—Lewvan	Tamela Friesen		F	Regina-Lewvan		839	1.75%	4th
Regina—Qu'Appelle	Greg Chatterson	2011 and 2008 candidate in this riding, 1997 Canadian Action Party candidate in this riding	M	Fort Qu'Appelle	Bricklayer	852	2.31%	4th
Regina—Wascana	Frances Simonson		F	Regina	Agrologist	878	2.06%	4th
Saskatoon—Grasswood	Mark Bigland-Pritchard		M	Saskatoon	Civil engineer	846	1.84%	4th
Saskatoon—University	Valerie Harvey		F			686	1.53%	4th
Saskatoon West	Glendon Toews		M	Saskatoon	Activist	658	1.74%	4th
Souris—Moose Mountain	Robert (Bob) Deptuck		M			994	2.65%	4th
Yorkton—Melville	Elaine Marie Hughes	2011 candidate	F	Archerwill	Retired	1,030	2.81%	4th

== Alberta - 34 seats ==
Riding	Candidate's Name	Notes	Gender	Residence	Occupation	Votes	%	Rank
Banff—Airdrie	Mike MacDonald	2011 candidate in Wild Rose	M	Cochrane	Mental health consultant	2,509	3.77%	4th
Battle River—Crowfoot	Gary Kelly		M	Tofield	Actor	1,868	3.18%	4th
Bow River	Rita Fromholt		F			919	1.84%	4th
Calgary Centre	Thana Boonlert		F			1,347	2.20%	4th
Calgary Confederation	Natalie Odd		F			2,146	3.21%	4th
Calgary Forest Lawn	Judson Hansell		M	Calgary	Plumber	1,229	2.99%	4th
Calgary Heritage	Kelly Christie	2011 and 2008 candidate in Calgary Southwest	M	Calgary	Construction supervisor	1,246	2.13%	4th
Calgary Midnapore	Brennan Wauters		M			1,691	2.66%	4th
Calgary Nose Hill	Laurie Scheer		F			1,384	2.54%	4th
Calgary Rocky Ridge	Catriona Wright		F			1,360	2.15%	4th
Calgary Shepard	Graham MacKenzie	2008 Alberta provincial Green candidate for Calgary-Currie	M	Calgary	Teacher	1,734	2.61%	4th
Calgary Signal Hill	Taryn Knorren		F			1,586	2.54%	4th
Calgary Skyview	Edward Reddy		M			846	1.88%	5th
Edmonton Centre	David Parker	2011, 2008, 2006 and 2004 candidate in this riding	M	Edmonton	Engineer	1,403	2.62%	4th
Edmonton Griesbach	Heather Workman		F	Edmonton	Performance artist	1,129	2.35%	4th
Edmonton Manning	Chris Vallee		M			1,079	2.20%	4th
Edmonton Mill Woods	Ralph McLean		M			1,096	2.21%	4th
Edmonton Riverbend	Valerie Kennedy	2011 and 2008 candidate in Edmonton—Leduc	F	Edmonton	Professor	1,275	2.21%	4th
Edmonton Strathcona	Jacob Binnema		M	Surrey, British Columbia	Student	1,278	2.30%	4th
Edmonton West	Pamela Bryan		F			1,037	1.94%	4th
Edmonton—Wetaskiwin	Joy Hudon		F	Leduc	Graphic designer	1,595	1.33%	4th
Foothills	Romy Tittel	Foothills Green Party Electoral District Association President	F	Calgary	Artist	1,983	3.25%	4th
Fort McMurray—Cold Lake	Brian Deheer		M			743	1.57%	4th
Grande Prairie-Mackenzie	James Friesen		M	Grovedale	Small business owner	1,673	3.14%	4th
Lakeland	Danielle Montgomery		F			1,283	2.34%	4th
Lethbridge	Kas MacMillan		M	Coalhurst	Student	1,461	2.57%	4th
Medicine Hat—Cardston—Warner	Brent Smith		M	Medicine Hat	Engineer	1,319	2.60%	4th
Peace River—Westlock	Sabrina Levac		F			1,247	2.52%	4th
Red Deer—Lacombe	Les Kuzyk		M			1,773	2.88%	4th
Red Deer—Mountain View	Simon Oleny		M			1,621	2.61%	4th
Sherwood Park—Fort Saskatchewan	Brandie Harrop		F	Sherwood Park	Anti-GMO activist	1,648	2.47%	4th
St. Albert—Edmonton	Andrea Oldham		F			821	1.39%	5th
Sturgeon River—Parkland	Brendon Greene		M	Spruce Grove	Music teacher	1,875	3.05%	4th
Yellowhead	Sandra Lange		F			1,538	2.93%	4th

== British Columbia - 42 seats ==
Riding	Candidate's Name	Notes	Gender	Residence	Occupation	Votes	%	Rank
Abbotsford	Stephen Fowler		M					
Burnaby North—Seymour	Lynne Quarmby		F	Burnaby	Scientist			
Burnaby South	Wyatt Tessari	2011 candidate in Mégantic—L'Érable	M	Burnaby	Student			
Cariboo—Prince George								
Central Okanagan—Similkameen—Nicola								
Chilliwack—Hope	Thomas Cheney		M	Chilliwack	Customer service			
Cloverdale—Langley City	Scott Anderson		M	Surrey	Construction			
Coquitlam—Port Coquitlam	Brad Nickason		M	Port Coquitlam	Businessman, graphic designer			
Courtenay—Alberni	Glenn Sollitt		M	Qualicum Beach	Businessman			
Cowichan—Malahat—Langford	Fran Hunt-Jinnouchi	Former Chief of the Quatsino First Nation and former director of the Office of Indigenous Affairs at the University of Victoria	F	Victoria	Restaurateur			
Delta								
Esquimalt—Saanich—Sooke	Frances Litman		F	Esquimalt	Photographer			
Fleetwood—Port Kells								
Kamloops—Thompson—Cariboo								
Kelowna—Lake Country								
Kootenay—Columbia	Bill Green	2011 candidate in this riding	M	Kimberley	Biologist			
Langley—Aldergrove	Simmi Dhillon		F	Langley				
Mission—Matsqui—Fraser Canyon	Arthur Green		M	Hope	Greensman			
Nanaimo—Ladysmith	Paul Manly	Son of former NDP MP James Manly	M	Nanaimo	Filmmaker, musician, sound designer			
New Westminster—Burnaby	Kyle Routledge		M	New Westminster	Wildlife Biologist			
North Island—Powell River	Brenda Sayers		F					
North Okanagan—Shuswap	Dave Smith		M	Vernon	Accountant			
North Vancouver	Claire Martin	Former CBC meteorologist for The National	F	North Vancouver	Meteorologist			
Pitt Meadows—Maple Ridge—Mission								
Port Moody—Coquitlam	Marcus Madsen		M	Port Moody	Realtor			
Prince George—Peace River—Northern Rockies								
Richmond Centre	Vincent Chiu		M	Richmond	Student			
Saanich—Gulf Islands	Elizabeth May	Incumbent Member of Parliament, Leader of the Green Party of Canada	F	Sidney	Lawyer			
Skeena—Bulkley Valley								
South Okanagan—West Kootenay								
South Surrey—White Rock	Larry Colero	2011 candidate in the former South Surrey—White Rock—Cloverdale riding	M		Facilitator and management consultant			
Steveston—Richmond East	Laura-Leah Shaw	2011 candidate in Vancouver Quadra	F		Realtor			
Surrey Centre								
Surrey—Newton								
Vancouver Centre	Lisa Barrett	Former mayor of Bowen Island	F	Vancouver	Civil mediator			
Vancouver East	Wes Regan		M	Vancouver	Community advocate			
Vancouver Granville	Michael Barkusky	Director at Board of Change and President of the Pacific Institute for Ecological Economics	M	Vancouver	Economist			
Vancouver Kingsway	Catherine Moore		F		Accounting Clerk			
Vancouver Quadra	Kris Constable		M	Vancouver	Privacy and security expert, Entrepreneur			
Vancouver South	Elain Ng		F	Vancouver	Mortgage broker			
Victoria	Jo-Ann Roberts	Former host of CBC Radio's All Points West	F	Victoria	Journalist			
West Vancouver—Sunshine Coast—Sea to Sky Country	Ken Melamed	Former Mayor of Whistler	M	Whistler	Construction			

== Yukon - 1 seat ==
Riding	Candidate's Name	Notes	Gender	Residence	Occupation	Votes	%	Rank
Yukon	Frank de Jong	Former Leader of the Green Party of Ontario (1993–2009), 1997 candidate for Ottawa Centre, 1995 by-election and 1993 candidate for Ottawa—Vanier, 1988 candidate for Rosedale	M	Faro	Environmentalist	533	2.63%	4th

== Northwest Territories - 1 seat ==
Riding	Candidate's Name	Notes	Gender	Residence	Occupation	Votes	%	Rank
Northwest Territories	John Moore		M		Executive Director at The Inuvik Youth Centre	537	2.83%	4th

== Nunavut - 1 seat ==
Riding	Candidate's Name	Notes	Gender	Residence	Occupation	Votes	%	Rank
Nunavut	Spencer Rocchi		M	Iqaluit	Teacher	182	1.53%	4th

== See also ==
- Results of the Canadian federal election, 2011
- Results by riding for the Canadian federal election, 2011
