= Ken Melamed =

Former Mayor of Whistler, British Colombia

Ken Melamed (born April 17, 1954) is a former mayor of Whistler, British Columbia. He is a businessman, conservationist and former Green Party of Canada candidate in West Vancouver-Sunshine Coast-Sea to Sky Country.

== Early history ==
A "ski bum turned politician," Melamed settled in Whistler in 1976. He joined the Whistler ski patrol and started a stonemasonry business, which he ran while raising his two sons, Dillon and Jesse, with his wife, Uschi.

Before and after becoming active in municipal politics, Melamed was part of several sustainability initiatives. From 1990 to 1996, he was president of the Association of Whistler Area Residents for the Environment (AWARE), where he worked to raise awareness about local wetlands. In 1996, he was elected to municipal council and gained recognition for scrutinizing large-scale developments and articulating the long-term implications of re-zoning. In 1999, Melamed became a founding director of Smart Growth BC, where he worked on solutions for affordable housing, agricultural land preservation, and climate change. He has also served on boards at Tourism Whistler, Whistler Housing Authority, Whistler Chamber of Commerce and American Friends of Whistler.

== Municipal politics ==
Ken Melamed was first elected to the Whistler council in 1996, serving as a councillor until 2005. He was elected as mayor in 2005 and served in that position until 2011, when he was defeated by Nancy Wilhelm-Morden.

== 2010 Winter Olympic and Paralympic Games ==
Melamed is best known for his negotiations during the 2010 Winter Olympic and Paralympic Games, which the Resort Municipality of Whistler co-hosted with the City of Vancouver. As a councillor, Melamed voted against an unconditional Olympic bid and was later elected mayor, perhaps because of his lone vote of caution, replacing Hugh O’Reilly who initiated the Olympic bid.

The Olympic bid was eventually successful and, as mayor, Melamed represented Whistler in negotiations with other stakeholders, including the Government of Canada, the Province of British Columbia, four host First Nations, the Vancouver Organizing Committee (VANOC), and the International Organizing Committee (IOC). Melamed ensured Whistler had the financial tools it needed to host the Games, demanding a greater share of provincial hotel taxes, initiating a long-term financial plan, and ensuring an affordable housing legacy. Part of this plan included a new annual income from Resort Municipality Funding (RMI), which still funds tourism in Whistler, and now 13 other communities in BC.

Despite VANOC driving up accommodation costs in Whistler, Melamed encouraged media and sponsors to stay in Whistler Village rather than commuting from Vancouver and pushed VANOC to use a previously promised location to host medal ceremonies.

In addition to making sure the Games were a financial success for Whistler, Melamed put a community plan in place that made 2010 Olympics the most ecologically sustainable Games ever.

== Green Party of Canada ==
Melamed won the Green Party nomination to run for Member of Parliament in West Vancouver—Sunshine Coast—Sea to Sky Country in the 2015 federal election. He was named the Finance Critic for the Green Party of Canada and was one of several high-profile Green candidates that ran in British Columbia in 2015, including Claire Martin (North Vancouver), Lynne Quarmby (Burnaby North–Seymour), Jo-Ann Roberts (Victoria), and Green Party Leader Elizabeth May (Saanich–Gulf Islands).

== Electoral record ==
=== Federal ===
2015 Canadian federal election: West Vancouver—Sunshine Coast—Sea to Sky Country
| Party | Candidate | Votes | % | ±% | Expenditures |
|---|---|---|---|---|---|
| Liberal | Pamela Goldsmith-Jones | 36,300 | 54.62 | +30.81 | $180,025.50 |
| Conservative | John Weston | 17,411 | 26.20 | -19.59 | $199,351.34 |
| New Democratic | Larry Koopman | 6,554 | 9.86 | -11.61 | – |
| Green | Ken Melamed | 5,907 | 8.89 | +1.26 | $129,042.88 |
| Marijuana | Robin Kehler | 180 | 0.27 | – | $176.40 |
| Marxist–Leninist | Carol-Lee Chapman | 106 | 0.16 | – | – |
| Total valid votes/expense limit | | 66,458 | 99.74 | | $241,170.76 |
| Total rejected ballots | | 173 | 0.26 | – | |
| Turnout | | 66,631 | 73.58 | – | |
| Eligible voters | | 90,554 | | | |
| Liberal gain from Conservative | | Swing | | +25.20 | |
Source: Elections Canada

=== Municipal ===
Whistler Mayor 2011

| Candidate | Vote | % |
|---|---|---|
| Nancy Wilhelm-Morden (X) | 2,636 | 67 |
| Ken Melamed | 610 | 15 |
| Ralph Forsyth | 498 | 14 |
| Brent David McIvor | 117 | .03 |
| Miro Kolvek | 19 | .004 |
| Shane Bennett | 18 | .004 |

Whistler Mayor 2008

| Candidate | Vote | % |
|---|---|---|
| Ken Melamed (X) | 1527 | 53 |
| Kristi Wells | 1218 | 42 |
| Brian Walker | 63 | 2 |
| Miro Kolvek | 54 | 1.9 |
| JB Bhandari | 3 | 0.1 |

Whistler Mayor 2005

| Candidate | Vote | % |
|---|---|---|
| Ken Melamed (X) | 1,769 | 47 |
| Ted Nebbeling | 1,416 | 38 |
| Kristi Wells | 346 | 0.1 |
| Nick Davies | 106 | 3 |
| Mike Brew | 83 | 2 |
| Stacy Kohut | 26 | 0.7 |
| Brian Walker | 15 | 0.4 |
