= Blair Wilson =

Canadian politician (born 1963)

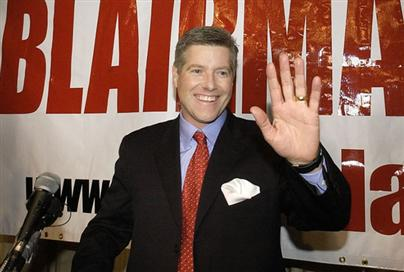

Member of Parliament for West Vancouver—Sunshine Coast—Sea to Sky Country
- In office January 23, 2006 – October 14, 2008
- Preceded by: John Reynolds
- Succeeded by: John Weston

Personal details
- Born: May 18, 1963 (age 63) North Vancouver, British Columbia, Canada
- Party: Green (since 2008)
- Other political affiliations: Liberal (2006–2007); Liberal without caucus (2007–2008); Independent (2008–2008)
- Spouse: Kelly Wilson
- Profession: Accountant

Blair Wilson (born May 18, 1963) is a Canadian politician and formerly the member of Parliament (MP) in the 39th Canadian parliament for West Vancouver—Sunshine Coast—Sea to Sky Country electoral district. He was elected on January 23, 2006, in the 2006 federal election as the Liberal candidate. Shortly before the 2008 election was called, Wilson changed his allegiance to the Green Party of Canada, becoming that party's first MP following a period as an independent although an election was called before the House could sit. He subsequently lost the election to Conservative John Weston.

Wilson is a chartered accountant and lives in Kelowna. He holds a bachelor's degree in political science from the University of Victoria.

In the 2006 election, Wilson narrowly defeated John Weston, the Conservative Party candidate. Weston lost by 1.5%, or 976 votes.

Wilson became involved in politics as the organizer for "The 2010 Rally on Robson" in support of the 2010 Winter Olympics in Vancouver during the City of Vancouver's plebiscite. He stood for Parliament in the 2004 federal election, narrowly losing to John Reynolds by 1687 votes in what has long been considered one of the more right-leaning seats in the Vancouver area. At one point, the Canadian Broadcasting Corporation had even declared Wilson the winner. However, when some of the more rural results came in, Reynolds was the winner.

== Controversy ==
On October 28, 2007, The Province newspaper alleged that Wilson's victory was aided by unlawful, off-the-books cash spending. In December 2007, the Liberal Party announced that Wilson would not be permitted to run under the Liberal Party banner following an investigation (unrelated to the investigation being conducted by Elections Canada) into Wilson's omissions of a number of legal and financial troubles during three nomination vetting processes.

Bill Lougheed, Wilson's father-in-law (who is a defendant in a lawsuit in which Wilson's wife is a plaintiff), made several unproven allegations in the October 28, 2007, edition of The Province, a Vancouver-based newspaper. The Province's article alleged that Wilson and his wife were subject to Social Services Tax Act liens on three properties and owe $2.1 million in bank mortgages, that Wilson misled the media about the true extent of his business success, exaggerating the number of restaurants he founded and claiming to have sold an accountancy business his in-laws claim closed, among other discrepancies, and that when Wilson's two restaurants, Mahoneys and Wilson's Steakhouse, closed, he was taken twice to the BC Employment Standards Tribunal for refusing to pay employees, was sued twice for failing to pay contractors, and was twice compelled by the courts to pay GST owing. None of the allegations was ever proven, and Blair denies all of the claims and commenced legal action against the anonymous tipster who made the campaign spending allegations after an Elections Canada probe found the allegations to be false. Wilson was also taken to court by a supplier over $33,839 that was owed (this amount was later paid).

On October 28, 2007, Wilson resigned from the Liberal Party caucus amid these allegations but retained his seat in the House of Commons as an independent.

On July 21, 2008, Elections Canada cleared Wilson of 21 of the 24 allegations raised by The Province's investigation. Wilson requested readmittance to the Liberal caucus in July 2008 but was not allowed to rejoin the party. It was announced on August 30, 2008, that he had joined the Green Party as that party's first Member of Parliament, although Parliament was dissolved before he could sit as a Green Party MP. He unsuccessfully ran for re-election in the Green Party.
