= Patrick Weiler =

Canadian politician (born 1986)

Patrick Weiler MP

Member of Parliament for West Vancouver—Sunshine Coast—Sea to Sky Country
- Incumbent
- Assumed office October 21, 2019
- Preceded by: Pamela Goldsmith-Jones

Personal details
- Born: April 30, 1986 (age 40) West Vancouver, British Columbia
- Party: Liberal Party of Canada
- Education: McGill University (B.A.); University of British Columbia (J.D)
- Profession: Lawyer

Patrick B. Weiler MP (born April 30, 1986) is a Canadian politician and former lawyer. He is a member of the Liberal Party and has represented the riding of West Vancouver—Sunshine Coast—Sea to Sky Country in the House of Commons of Canada since the 2019 Canadian federal election. He was re-elected in 2021 and 2025.

== Early life and education ==
Weiler was born in West Vancouver, British Columbia, and raised in both West Vancouver and Sechelt. His father is Joe Weiler, a UBC law professor, and his mother is Beverly Tanchak, a former Sechelt municipal councillor.

He earned a Bachelor of Arts from McGill University and a Juris Doctor degree from the University of British Columbia.

== Legal career ==
Weiler's legal career focused on environmental and aboriginal law. His work included collaboration at the United Nations to improve the management of aquatic ecosystems. He also represented First Nations, municipalities, small businesses and non-profits on environmental and corporate legal matters.

== Political career ==
Weiler entered federal politics in 2019 after incumbent Liberal MP Pamela Goldsmith-Jones chose not to seek re-election. During the 2019 federal election he emphasized climate action and support for Canada’s international environmental commitments. He was elected with 34.9% of the vote.

In the 2021 federal election, Weiler was re-elected with 33.9% of the vote, defeating Conservative Party candidate John Weston, who had represented the riding from 2008 to 2015, and New Democratic Party candidate Avi Lewis, a filmmaker and political activist.

Weiler was again re-elected in the 2025 federal election, receiving with 59.7% of the vote, a 26.73% increase from his 2021 result.

As an MP, Weiler has announced significant investments from the federal government. This includes a $117 million investment for a proposed reservoir in Sechelt, led by the Shíshálh Nation in collaboration with the Sunshine Coast Regional District. He has also announced a series of housing investments under the Housing Accelerator Fund in local municipalities, including Squamish, Whistler, Gibsons, Pemberton, and Bowen Island.

In November 2024, he joined several members of the Liberal caucus to call for a secret ballot to be held on Prime Minister Justin Trudeau's leadership. Following Chrystia Freeland's resignation from Cabinet in December 2024, Weiler publicly called for Trudeau to resign before the next election. Weiler subsequently endorsed Mark Carney in the 2025 Liberal Party of Canada leadership election.

He was elected chair of the Canadian House of Commons Standing Committee on Fisheries and Oceans in the 45th Canadian Parliament in 2025.

Weiler has challenged his party's positions on several issues, including advocating for an immediate ceasefire in the Gaza war in November 2023, and supporting electoral reforms bills, such as Bill C-210 which would lower the voting age to 16.

== Electoral record ==
2025 Canadian federal election: West Vancouver—Sunshine Coast—Sea to Sky Country
Party	Candidate	Votes	%	±%	Expenditures
Liberal	Patrick Weiler	38,384	59.74	+26.69	
Conservative	Keith Roy	21,181	32.97	+3.83	
Green	Lauren Greenlaw	2,205	3.43	–3.37	
New Democratic	Jäger Rosenberg	2,077	3.24	–23.65	
People's	Peyman Askari	308	0.48	–3.28	
Rhinoceros	Gordon Jeffrey	100	0.16	+0.01	
Total valid votes/expense limit		64,247	99.60		
Total rejected ballots		259	0.4		
Turnout		64,506	71.54	+6.67	
Eligible voters		90,173			
Population		114,257			
Liberal notional hold		Swing		+11.48	
Source: Elections Canada

2021 Canadian federal election: West Vancouver—Sunshine Coast—Sea to Sky Country
Party	Candidate	Votes	%	±%	Expenditures
Liberal	Patrick Weiler	21,500	33.88	-1.01	$107,414.31
Conservative	John Weston	19,062	30.04	+3.33	$123,189.13
New Democratic	Avi Lewis	16,265	25.63	+11.74	$117,546.51
Green	Mike Simpson	4,108	6.47	-15.97	$35,992.60
People's	Doug Bebb	2,299	3.62	+2.08	$26,851.53
Rhinoceros	Gordon Jeffrey	98	0.15	-0.12	$0.00
Independent	Chris MacGregor	77	0.12		$0.00
Independent	Terry Grimwood	50	0.08	-0.16	$0.00
Total valid votes/expense limit		63,459	–	–	$131,270.20
Total rejected ballots		279			
Turnout		64.6%			
Eligible voters		98,256			
Liberal hold		Swing		-2.17	
Source: Elections Canada

2019 Canadian federal election: West Vancouver—Sunshine Coast—Sea to Sky Country
Party	Candidate	Votes	%	±%	Expenditures
Liberal	Patrick Weiler	22,673	34.89	-19.73	$117,192.92
Conservative	Gabrielle Loren	17,359	26.71	+0.52	$110,144.62
Green	Dana Taylor	14,579	22.44	+13.55	$61,513.07
New Democratic	Judith Wilson	9,027	13.89	+4.03	$5,518.93
People's	Robert Douglas Bebb	1,010	1.55		$20,418.15
Rhinoceros	Gordon Jeffrey	173	0.27		none listed
Independent	Terry Grimwood	159	0.24		$0.00
Total valid votes/expense limit		64,980	99.49		
Total rejected ballots		335	0.51	+0.25	
Turnout		65,315	68.47	-5.11	
Eligible voters		95,395			
Liberal hold		Swing		-10.12	
Source: Elections Canada
