= Pamela Goldsmith-Jones =

Canadian politician

Parliamentary Secretary to the Minister of International Trade
- In office January 30, 2017 – September 11, 2019
- Minister: François-Philippe Champagne
- Preceded by: David Lametti

Parliamentary Secretary to the Minister of Foreign Affairs
- In office December 2, 2015 – January 27, 2017
- Minister: Stephane Dion
- Preceded by: David Anderson
- Succeeded by: Matt DeCourcey

Member of Parliament for West Vancouver—Sunshine Coast—Sea to Sky Country
- In office October 19, 2015 – September 11, 2019
- Preceded by: John Weston
- Succeeded by: Patrick Weiler

Mayor of West Vancouver
- In office 2005–2011
- Preceded by: Ron Wood
- Succeeded by: Michael Smith

Personal details
- Born: 1961 (age 64–65)
- Party: Liberal
- Education: University of British Columbia; Simon Fraser University

Pamela Goldsmith-Jones (born 1961) is a Canadian politician. A member of the Liberal Party of Canada, she served as the Member of Parliament (MP) for West Vancouver—Sunshine Coast—Sea to Sky Country from 2015 to 2019. Previously, she was Mayor of West Vancouver, British Columbia, from 2005 to 2011.

== Career ==
Goldsmith-Jones attended École Pauline Johnson Elementary School and West Vancouver Secondary School. She attended the University of British Columbia (BA, 1983; MA 1988) where she studied Political Science. She was elected over incumbent Ron Wood on November 19, 2005, and re-elected in 2008. She retired from municipal politics in December 2011, declining to run for a third term.

Goldsmith-Jones completed her executive MBA at Simon Fraser University's Beedie School of Business and ran a consulting firm from 2012 to 2015. During her career, Goldsmith-Jones also helped with a number of initiatives in British Columbia. Some of these included a call for an end to open-penned salmon farming, and a transition to closed containment instead. Other bills and initiatives she worked on included the second national plan for Women, Peace, and Security in 2017 as well as carbon emission reduction initiatives.

== Politics ==
In 2014, Goldsmith-Jones announced her intention to challenge incumbent West Vancouver—Sunshine Coast—Sea to Sky Country MP John Weston in the 2015 federal election. Goldsmith-Jones won the Liberal Party of Canada nomination in June 2014. She unseated Weston the following October, winning the election.

On August 31, 2018, she was appointed Parliamentary Secretary to the Minister of Foreign Affairs (Consular Affairs). She has also served as Parliamentary Secretary to the Minister of International Trade Diversification and to the Minister of Foreign Affairs. In 2019, she did not aid in or sponsor any bills in the House of Commons.

As of May 2019, Goldsmith-Jones announced her retirement from federal politics, opting not to run for re-election in 2019. In the 2019 Canadian federal election she was replaced by Liberal MP Patrick Weiler.

== Electoral record ==
2015 Canadian federal election: West Vancouver—Sunshine Coast—Sea to Sky Country
Party	Candidate	Votes	%	±%	Expenditures
Liberal	Pamela Goldsmith-Jones	36,300	54.62	+30.81	$180,025.50
Conservative	John Weston	17,411	26.20	–19.59	$193,526.78
New Democratic	Larry Koopman	6,554	9.86	–11.61	$34,070.34
Green	Ken Melamed	5,907	8.89	+1.26	$130,542.88
Marijuana	Robin Kehler	180	0.27	–	$176.40
Marxist–Leninist	Carol Lee Chapman	106	0.16	–	none listed
Total valid votes/expense limit		66,458	99.74	–	$241,170.76
Total rejected ballots		173	0.26	–0.09	
Turnout		66,631	73.58	+10.28	
Eligible voters		90,554			
Liberal gain from Conservative		Swing		+25.20	
Source: Elections Canada
