= John Weston (Canadian politician) =

Canadian politician

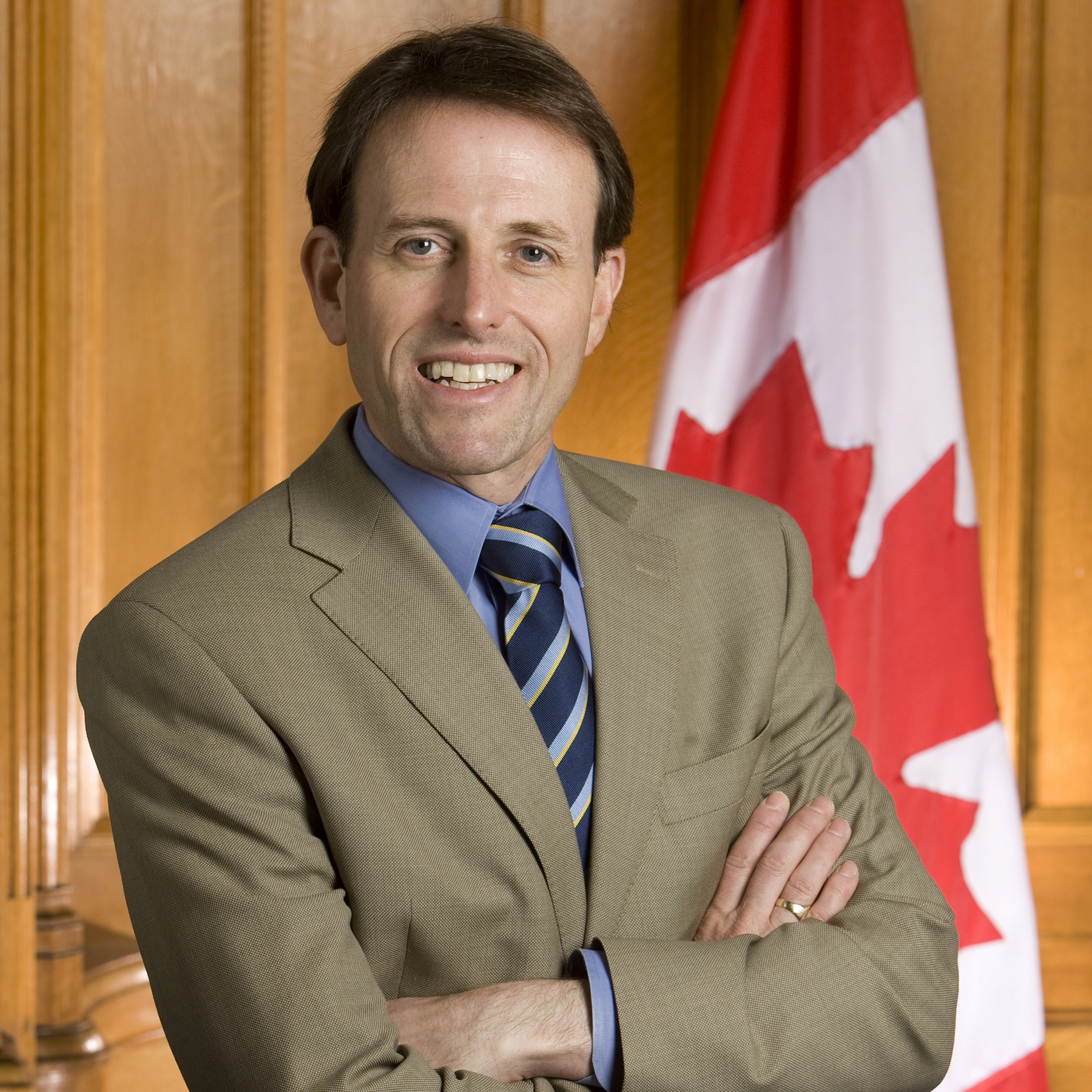

Member of Parliament for West Vancouver—Sunshine Coast—Sea to Sky Country
- In office October 14, 2008 – October 19, 2015
- Preceded by: Blair Wilson
- Succeeded by: Pamela Goldsmith-Jones

Personal details
- Born: April 19, 1958 (age 68) Vancouver, British Columbia, Canada
- Party: Conservative
- Profession: Lawyer

John D. Weston (born April 19, 1958) is a former Canadian politician, who was a Member of Parliament from 2008 to 2015, representing the electoral district of West Vancouver—Sunshine Coast—Sea to Sky Country. He is a member of the Conservative Party.

Weston studied International Relations at Harvard University, law at Osgoode Hall Law School, and is able to speak Mandarin as well as French and English. He then worked as a lawyer in Canada and in Taiwan. He is a founder of Pan Pacific Law Corporation and Access Law Group, as well as the Canadian Constitution Foundation.

Weston ran in the 2006 Canadian federal election but was defeated, by Blair Wilson. Weston lost by 1.5%, or 976 votes.

During the 40th Parliament, he served as a member of the Aboriginal Affairs, Fisheries, and Library of Parliament Standing Committees, and as the Government Liaison to the Persian and Iranian Community, and as the Vice Chair of the Conservative Community Relations Committee.

After being re-elected in the 2011 Canadian federal election, Weston has served on the Citizenship and Immigration Committee and as a member of the Official Languages Committee.

Weston introduced bill C-475, which amended the Controlled Drugs and Substances Act, to make it illegal to possess, produce, sell or import chemicals with the knowledge they will be used to create street drugs, though it was later tabled.

Weston created a National Health and Fitness Day bill, commenting: "On a personal level I just saw when I reached Ottawa how unhealthy was the lifestyle that MPs lead — so much time on airplanes and in committees and sitting in Parliament. I just resolved that if I was going to remain productive and useful to the people who voted me in, I needed to work at staying healthy."

In his column in The Tyee, political commentator Rafe Mair has been extremely critical of Weston's approach to environmental issues and his role as a Member of Parliament. Mair has repeatedly accused Weston of blindly adhering to Conservative Party policy on all issues. In an article dated January 19, 2015, Mair alleged that in Weston's time as an MP he had "never uttered a single word of criticism of any statement or action by the [Conservative] government". Weston and Mair are former colleagues from Mair's time as a BC MLA, and his role as minister responsible for constitutional reform during that period. Weston has responded to Mair by claiming that he carefully considers his position on environmental issues and comes to his own decision. In a responding letter to the editor, Weston also stated that Mair's critique had ignored the role of the democratic process and denigrated MPs' role in it.

In the 2015 federal election, he was defeated by Liberal candidate Pamela Goldsmith-Jones.

In the 2021 Canadian federal election, he attempted to make a comeback and return to parliament. Although he made gains compared to the Conservatives results in the previous election, he was once again defeated, this time by incumbent Liberal MP Patrick Weiler. He was initially renominated to contest the 45th Canadian federal election in the riding, but decided to step back and was replaced by Keith Roy as the Conservative candidate.

== Electoral record ==
2021 Canadian federal election: West Vancouver—Sunshine Coast—Sea to Sky Country
Party	Candidate	Votes	%	±%	Expenditures
Liberal	Patrick Weiler	21,500	33.88	-1.01	$107,414.31
Conservative	John Weston	19,062	30.04	+3.33	$123,189.13
New Democratic	Avi Lewis	16,265	25.63	+11.74	$117,546.51
Green	Mike Simpson	4,108	6.47	-15.97	$35,992.60
People's	Doug Bebb	2,299	3.62	+2.08	$26,851.53
Rhinoceros	Gordon Jeffrey	98	0.15	-0.12	$0.00
Independent	Chris MacGregor	77	0.12		$0.00
Independent	Terry Grimwood	50	0.08	-0.16	$0.00
Total valid votes/expense limit		63,459	–	–	$131,270.20
Total rejected ballots		279			
Turnout		64.6%			
Eligible voters		98,256			
Liberal hold		Swing		-2.17	
Source: Elections Canada

2011 Canadian federal election
Party	Candidate	Votes	%	±%	Expenditures
Conservative	John Weston*	28,614	45.53	+0.96	
New Democratic	Terry Platt	14,828	23.59	+9.16	
Liberal	Daniel Veniez	14,123	22.47	-4.10	
Green	Brennan Wauters	4,436	7.06	-7.37	
Progressive Canadian	Roger Lagassé	293	0.47	–	
Libertarian	Tunya Audain	250	0.40	–	
Western Block	Allan Holt	156	0.25	–	
Marxist–Leninist	Carol Lee Chapman	87	0.14	–	
Canadian Action	Doug Hartt	64	0.10	–	
Total valid votes		62,851	100.00		
Total rejected ballots		221	0.35	+0.01	
Turnout		63,072	64.17	-0.28	
Eligible voters		98,293	–	–	

2008 Canadian federal election
Party	Candidate	Votes	%	±%	Expenditures
Conservative	John Weston	26,949	44.57	+8.60	$94,785
Liberal	Ian Sutherland	16,069	26.57	-10.93	$74,135
New Democratic	Bill Forst	8,728	14.43	-5.63	$18,762
Green	Blair Wilson*	8,723	14.43	+8.20	$95,067
Total valid votes/Expense limit		60,469	100.00	$100,350	
Total rejected ballots		208	0.34	+0.12	
Turnout		60,677	64.45	-4.1	
Conservative gain from Green		Swing		+9.8	

2006 Canadian federal election
Party	Candidate	Votes	%	±%	Expenditures
Liberal	Blair Wilson	23,867	37.50	+4.99	$82,304
Conservative	John Weston	22,881	35.97	+0.68	$86,639
New Democratic Party	Judith Wilson	12,766	20.06	-1.66	$50,621
Green	Silvaine Zimmermann	3,966	6.23	-3.49	$3,532
Marxist–Leninist	Anne Jamieson	155	0.22	+0.02	$0
Total valid votes		63,635	100.00		
Total rejected ballots		144	0.23	0.0	
Turnout		63,635	68.6	+2.6	
Liberal gain from Conservative		Swing	+2.2		
