= West Vancouver—Sunshine Coast—Sea to Sky Country =

Federal electoral district in British Columbia, Canada

Coordinates: 49.89°N 123.18°W

British Columbia electoral district
- Interactive map of riding boundaries from the 2025 federal election. Point indicates the municipality of West Vancouver.

Federal electoral district
- Legislature: House of Commons
MP
Patrick Weiler
Liberal
- District created: 1996
- First contested: 1997
- Last contested: 2025
- District webpage: profile, map

Demographics
- Population (2021): 131,206
- Electors (2021): 98,256
- Area (km²): 13,237
- Pop. density (per km²): 9.9
- Census subdivision(s): West Vancouver (part), Squamish, Whistler, Sechelt, Gibsons, Bowen Island, Pemberton, Lions Bay, Mount Currie, shíshálh Nation

West Vancouver—Sunshine Coast—Sea to Sky Country (formerly West Vancouver—Sunshine Coast) is a federal electoral district in British Columbia, Canada, which has been represented in the House of Commons since 1997.

Since the 2019 federal election, its Member of Parliament (MP) has been Patrick Weiler of the Liberal Party.

== Geography ==
The district includes the regional districts of Sunshine Coast, the southern portion of the Squamish–Lillooet Regional District, including the municipalities of Whistler, Squamish, Pemberton; and West Vancouver, Lions Bay and Bowen Island, which are in the Metro Vancouver Regional District.

== Demographics ==
Panethnic groups in West Vancouver—Sunshine Coast—Sea to Sky Country (2011−2021)
Panethnic group	2021		2016		2011	
Panethnic group	Pop.	%	Pop.	%	Pop.	%
European (Note: Statistic includes all persons that did not make up part of a visible minority or an indigenous identity.)	92,880	72.09%	87,080	74.65%	87,300	78.79%
East Asian (Note: Statistic includes total responses of "Chinese", "Korean", and "Japanese" under visible minority section on census.)	12,610	9.79%	11,245	9.64%	7,710	6.96%
Indigenous	7,150	5.55%	6,630	5.68%	5,495	4.96%
Middle Eastern (Note: Statistic includes total responses of "West Asian" and "Arab" under visible minority section on census.)	6,410	4.97%	4,760	4.08%	4,035	3.64%
South Asian	3,665	2.84%	2,820	2.42%	2,485	2.24%
Southeast Asian (Note: Statistic includes total responses of "Filipino" and "Southeast Asian" under visible minority section on census.)	3,055	2.37%	2,450	2.1%	2,220	2%
Latin American	1,175	0.91%	635	0.54%	405	0.37%
African	760	0.59%	465	0.4%	565	0.51%
Other (Note: Statistic includes total responses of "Visible minority, n.i.e." and "Multiple visible minorities" under visible minority section on census.)	1,145	0.89%	575	0.49%	590	0.53%
Total responses	128,845	98.2%	116,650	97.93%	110,805	98.17%
Total population	131,206	100%	119,113	100%	112,875	100%
Notes: Totals greater than 100% due to multiple origin responses. Demographics based on 2012 Canadian federal electoral redistribution riding boundaries.

According to the 2016 Canadian census; 2013 representation

Languages: 76.9% English, 4.4% Mandarin, 3.8% Persian, 2.4% French, 1.9% German, 1.0% Punjabi,
Religions (2011): 42.4% Christian (13.3% Catholic, 8.6% Anglican, 6.8% United Church, 1.6% Baptist, 1.5% Lutheran, 1.1% Presbyterian, 9.5% Other), 3.3% Muslim, 1.3% Buddhist, 1.0% Jewish, 1.0% Sikh, 49.3% No religion
Median income (2015): $35,774
Average income (2015): $65,168

== History ==
The electoral district was created as "West Vancouver–Sunshine Coast" in 1996 from parts of Capilano—Howe Sound and North Island—Powell River ridings.

In 2003, it was renamed "West Vancouver—Sunshine Coast—Sea to Sky Country". At 48 characters, this was the current longest riding name in Canada until 2015, when it was overtaken by the renamed, 49-character Leeds—Grenville—Thousand Islands and Rideau Lakes.

The riding or electoral district is also the first to have been represented in Parliament by a member of the Green Party, Blair Wilson. Elected as part of the Liberal party, he crossed the floor later in his career to become a member of the Green Party representing West Vancouver—Sunshine Coast—Sea to Sky Country. However, this came immediately before the 2008 federal election, in which he was defeated, and he never had the opportunity to sit in the House as a Green MP.

The 2012 federal electoral boundaries redistribution concluded that the electoral boundaries of West Vancouver—Sunshine Coast—Sea to Sky Country should be adjusted, and a modified electoral district of the same name would be contested in future elections. The redefined West Vancouver—Sunshine Coast—Sea to Sky Country:

- loses the Powell River Regional District to the district of North Island—Powell River;
- regains the community of Pemberton and area that had been transferred from it to Chilliwack—Fraser Canyon in the previous redistribution; and
- sees its boundary with North Vancouver adjusted to correspond to the boundaries between the District of North Vancouver, West Vancouver and the Capilano Indian Reserve.

These new boundaries were legally defined in the 2013 representation order, which came into effect upon the call of the 42nd Canadian federal election, scheduled for October 2015.

During the 2022 redistribution the area south of the Trans-Canada Highway and east of 21 St, was cut out of the riding and added to North Vancouver—Capilano. This included Park Royal Shopping Centre, Sentinel Hill and all of Ambleside. The boundary change was criticized by some, including Patrick Weiler, the Member of Parliament for the riding.

== Members of Parliament ==
This riding has elected the following members of Parliament:

Parliament	Years	Member	Party
West Vancouver—Sunshine Coast; Riding created from Capilano—Howe Sound and North Island—Powell River
36th	1997–2000	John Reynolds	Reform
36th	2000–2000	John Reynolds	Alliance
37th	2000–2003	John Reynolds	Alliance
37th	2003–2004	John Reynolds	Conservative
West Vancouver—Sunshine Coast—Sea to Sky Country
38th	2004–2006	John Reynolds	Conservative
39th	2006–2007	Blair Wilson	Liberal
39th	2007–2008	Blair Wilson	Independent
39th	2008–2008	Blair Wilson	Green
40th	2008–2011	John Weston	Conservative
41st	2011–2015	John Weston	Conservative
42nd	2015–2019	Pamela Goldsmith-Jones	Liberal
43rd	2019–2021	Patrick Weiler	Liberal
44th	2021–2025	Patrick Weiler	Liberal
45th	2025–present	Patrick Weiler	Liberal

=== Current member of Parliament ===
Patrick Weiler is the current member of Parliament for this riding. He was elected after the incumbent, Pamela Goldsmith-Jones chose not to run for re-election in the 2019 federal election. He was re-elected in the 2021 federal election and again in the 2025 federal election.

=== Former members of Parliament ===
The first member of Parliament to represent the riding was John Reynolds, who previously served as the Progressive Conservative MP for Burnaby—Richmond—Delta from 1972 to 1977 and Social Credit MLA for West Vancouver-Howe Sound from 1983 to 1991. He was first elected in West Vancouver-Sunshine Coast in the 1997 election. He was a member of the Reform Party, and its successors the Canadian Alliance and the Conservative Party. After Stockwell Day was pushed out as leader of the Canadian Alliance, Reynolds served as interim leader and Leader of the Official Opposition. He served as a member on the Standing Committee on Procedure and House Affairs. Reynolds did not run in the 2006 general election.

Liberal Blair Wilson was elected in the 2006 federal election. Wilson, a chartered accountant and a former restaurant owner, was the first Liberal MP for the historically Conservative riding. He had previously run in the 2004 federal election and lost to John Reynolds. Wilson resigned from caucus in October 2007 after allegations of improper campaign spending and failure to mention several legal and financial troubles during three nomination vetting processes. He remained a Liberal but not in caucus. In January 2008, Wilson became an independent. He then joined the Green Party on August 30, 2008, becoming its first MP. Running under the Green banner in the election called only days later.

John Weston of the Conservative Party defeated Wilson in the 2008 federal election. He was re-elected in the 2011 federal election by a comfortable margin. He lost re-election in 2015. Weston attempted to make a comeback in the 2021 federal election, but lost to incumbent Patrick Weiler.

Former Mayor of West Vancouver, Pamela Goldsmith-Jones of the Liberal Party, unseated John Weston in the 2015 federal election by a wide margin. She served as Parliamentary Secretary to the Minister of Foreign Affairs and Parliamentary Secretary to the Minister of International Trade Diversification. In the 2019 federal election, Goldsmith-Jones did not run for re-election.

== Election results ==
Graph of election results in West Vancouver—Sunshine Coast—Sea to Sky Country (minor parties that never got 2% of the vote or didn't run consistently are omitted) View source data.

=== West Vancouver—Sunshine Coast—Sea to Sky Country ===
2025 Canadian federal election
Party	Candidate	Votes	%	±%	Expenditures
Liberal	Patrick Weiler	38,384	59.74	+26.69	$102,188.08
Conservative	Keith Roy	21,181	32.97	+3.83	$133,136.23
Green	Lauren Greenlaw	2,205	3.43	–3.37	$28,390.20
New Democratic	Jäger Rosenberg	2,070	3.22	–23.67	$10,086.15
People's	Peyman Askari	308	0.48	–3.28	$15,820.33
Rhinoceros	Gordon Jeffrey	99	0.15	–0.01	$424.11
Total valid votes/expense limit		64,247	99.60	–	$142,490.45
Total rejected ballots		259	0.40	–0.04	
Turnout		64,506	71.12	+6.55	
Eligible voters		90,706			
Liberal notional hold		Swing		+11.43	
Source: Elections Canada

2021 federal election redistributed results
Party	Vote	%
Liberal	18,509	33.05
Conservative	16,319	29.14
New Democratic	15,058	26.89
Green	3,809	6.80
People's	2,103	3.76
Others	207	0.37

2021 Canadian federal election
Party	Candidate	Votes	%	±%	Expenditures
Liberal	Patrick Weiler	21,500	33.88	–1.01	$104,912.15
Conservative	John Weston	19,062	30.04	+3.32	$132,156.43
New Democratic	Avi Lewis	16,265	25.63	+11.74	$111,019.05
Green	Mike Simpson	4,108	6.47	–15.96	$35,675.05
People's	Doug Bebb	2,299	3.62	+2.07	$26,851.78
Rhinoceros	Gordon Jeffrey	98	0.15	–0.11	none listed
Independent	Chris MacGregor	77	0.12	–	none listed
Independent	Terry Grimwood	50	0.08	–0.17	none listed
Total valid votes/expense limit		63,459	99.56	–	$131,270.53
Total rejected ballots		279	0.44	–0.08	
Turnout		63,738	64.57	–3.90	
Eligible voters		98,717			
Liberal hold		Swing		–2.17	
Source: Elections Canada

2019 Canadian federal election
Party	Candidate	Votes	%	±%	Expenditures
Liberal	Patrick Weiler	22,673	34.89	–19.73	$115,345.87
Conservative	Gabrielle Loren	17,359	26.71	+0.52	$102,418.94
Green	Dana Taylor	14,579	22.44	+13.55	$61,513.07
New Democratic	Judith Wilson	9,027	13.89	+4.03	$5,518.93
People's	Robert Douglas Bebb	1,010	1.55	–	$20,418.15
Rhinoceros	Gordon Jeffrey	173	0.27	–	$193.32
Independent	Terry Grimwood	159	0.24	–	none listed
Total valid votes/expense limit		64,980	99.49	–	$124,659.06
Total rejected ballots		335	0.51	+0.25	
Turnout		65,315	68.47	–5.11	
Eligible voters		95,395			
Liberal hold		Swing		–10.12	
Source: Elections Canada

2015 Canadian federal election
Party	Candidate	Votes	%	±%	Expenditures
Liberal	Pamela Goldsmith-Jones	36,300	54.62	+30.81	$180,025.50
Conservative	John Weston	17,411	26.20	–19.59	$193,526.78
New Democratic	Larry Koopman	6,554	9.86	–11.61	$34,070.34
Green	Ken Melamed	5,907	8.89	+1.26	$130,542.88
Marijuana	Robin Kehler	180	0.27	–	$176.40
Marxist–Leninist	Carol Lee Chapman	106	0.16	–	none listed
Total valid votes/expense limit		66,458	99.74	–	$241,170.76
Total rejected ballots		173	0.26	–0.09	
Turnout		66,631	73.58	+10.28	
Eligible voters		90,554			
Liberal gain from Conservative		Swing		+25.20	
Source: Elections Canada

2011 federal election redistributed results
Party	Vote	%
Conservative	23,840	45.79
Liberal	12,395	23.81
New Democratic	11,177	21.47
Green	3,971	7.63
Others	680	1.31

2011 Canadian federal election
Party	Candidate	Votes	%	±%	Expenditures
Conservative	John Weston	28,614	45.53	+0.96	$92,487.79
New Democratic	Terry Platt	14,828	23.59	+9.16	$10,615.67
Liberal	Dan Veniez	14,123	22.47	–4.10	$103,634.48
Green	Brennan Wauters	4,436	7.06	–7.37	$483.93
Progressive Canadian	Roger Lagassé	293	0.47	–	$123.72
Libertarian	Tunya Audain	250	0.40	–	none listed
Western Block	Allan Holt	156	0.25	–	none listed
Marxist–Leninist	Carol Lee Chapman	87	0.14	–	none listed
Canadian Action	Doug Hartt	64	0.10	–	none listed
Total valid votes/expense limit		62,851	99.65	–	$104,879.96
Total rejected ballots		221	0.35	+0.01	
Turnout		63,072	63.30	–0.06	
Eligible voters		99,642			
Conservative hold		Swing		–4.10	
Source: Elections Canada

2008 Canadian federal election
Party	Candidate	Votes	%	±%	Expenditures
Conservative	John Weston	26,949	44.57	+8.59	$89,786.92
Liberal	Ian Sutherland	16,069	26.57	–10.93	$72,827.79
New Democratic	Bill Forst (Note: Original candidate was Dana Larsen, but he withdrew before candidate nominations closed.)	8,728	14.43	–5.63	$18,312.27
Green	Blair Wilson	8,723	14.43	+8.19	$93,514.28
Total valid votes/expense limit		60,469	99.66	–	$100,349.92
Total rejected ballots		208	0.34	+0.12	
Turnout		60,677	63.36	–4.95	
Eligible voters		95,764			
Conservative gain from Liberal		Swing		+9.76	
Green candidate Blair Wilson lost 23.07 percentage points from his 2006 performance as a Liberal.
Source: Elections Canada

2006 Canadian federal election
Party	Candidate	Votes	%	±%	Expenditures
Liberal	Blair Wilson	23,867	37.51	+4.99	$78,591.09
Conservative	John Weston	22,891	35.97	+0.68	$86,030.78
New Democratic	Judith Wilson	12,766	20.06	–1.66	$47,913.31
Green	Silvaine Zimmermann	3,966	6.23	–3.49	$2,931.87
Marxist–Leninist	Anne Jamieson	145	0.23	+0.02	none listed
Total valid votes/expense limit		63,635	99.77	–	$93,260.52
Total rejected ballots		144	0.23	–	
Turnout		63,779	68.32	–	
Eligible voters		93,360			
Liberal gain from Conservative		Swing		+2.84	
Source: Elections Canada

=== West Vancouver—Sunshine Coast ===
2004 Canadian federal election: West Vancouver—Sunshine Coast
Party	Candidate	Votes	%	±%	Expenditures
Conservative	John Reynolds	21,372	35.30	–22.04	$78,919.83
Liberal	Blair Wilson	19,685	32.51	+5.91	$79,224.71
New Democratic	Nicholas Simons	13,156	21.73	+15.43	$28,164.19
Green	Andrea Goldsmith	5,887	9.72	+4.83	$28,167.58
Canadian Action	Marc Bombois	321	0.53	–1.30	$117.39
Marxist–Leninist	Anne Jamieson	123	0.20	–	none listed
Total valid votes/expense limit		60,544	99.77	–	$89,462.15
Total rejected ballots		139	0.23	–0.06	
Turnout		60,683	66.00	+2.19	
Eligible voters		91,943			
Conservative hold		Swing		–13.98	
Conservative change is from the combination of Progressive Conservative and Canadian Alliance vote.
Source: Elections Canada

2000 Canadian federal election: West Vancouver—Sunshine Coast
Party	Candidate	Votes	%	±%	Expenditures
Alliance	John Reynolds	25,546	47.97	+7.91	$65,492
Liberal	Ian G. McKay	14,169	26.60	–7.92	$60,517
Progressive Conservative	Kate Manvell	4,993	9.38	+1.01	$5,777
New Democratic	Telis Savvaidis	3,351	6.29	–5.64	$9,069
Green	Jane Bishop	2,605	4.89	+0.27	$3,816
Marijuana	Dana Larsen	1,618	3.04	–	none listed
Canadian Action	Marc Bombois	976	1.83	–	$3,227
Total valid votes		53,258	99.71		
Total rejected ballots		155	0.29	–0.10	
Turnout		53,413	63.81	–2.99	
Eligible voters		83,706			
Alliance hold		Swing		+7.92	
Canadian Alliance change is based on the Reform Party vote.
Source: Elections Canada

1997 Canadian federal election: West Vancouver—Sunshine Coast
Party	Candidate	Votes	%	Expenditures
Reform	John Reynolds	20,092	40.05	$62,107
Liberal	Phil Boname	17,318	34.52	$62,278
New Democratic	Clark Banks	5,988	11.94	$9,548
Progressive Conservative	Dave Thomas	4,194	8.36	$36,317
Green	Lisa Barrett	2,318	4.62	$935
Natural Law	David Grayson	254	0.51	none listed
Total valid votes		50,164	99.60	
Total rejected ballots		199	0.40	
Turnout		50,363	66.80	
Eligible voters		75,394		
This riding was created from parts of Capilano—Howe Sound and North Island—Powell River, both of which elected Reform candidates in the last election.
Source: Elections Canada

== See also ==
- List of Canadian electoral districts
- Historical federal electoral districts of Canada

== Sources ==
- "West Vancouver—Sunshine Coast—Sea to Sky Country (Code 59036) Census Profile". 2011 census. Government of Canada - Statistics Canada.
- Library of Parliament Riding Profile (1996–2003)
- Library of Parliament Riding Profile (2003–present)
- Expenditures – 2004
- Expenditures – 2000
- Expenditures – 1997
