= Cowichan-Alberni =

Electoral district in British Columbia, Canada

Cowichan-Alberni was a provincial electoral district in the Canadian province of British Columbia. It appeared in the 1894 general election only. It was formed by combining the Alberni riding and parts of the older Cowichan riding. Alberni riding and Cowichan riding were restored for the 1898 election.

== Demographics ==
Population, 1986
Population change, 1903–1986
Area (km^{2})
Population density (people per km^{2})

== Electoral history ==
Note: Winners in each election are in bold.

7th 1894 British Columbia general election
Party	Candidate	Votes	%	±	Expenditures
Government	**Theodore Davie**	**Accl.**	%	–	unknown
Government	**James Mitchell Mutter**	**Accl.**	%	–	unknown
Total valid votes		-	%		
Total rejected ballots					
Turnout		%			

8th 1898 British Columbia general election
Party	Candidate	Votes	%	±	Expenditures
Government	**James Dunsmuir^{2}**	**297**	**64.71%**	–	unknown
Opposition	William James McAllan	162	35.29%	–	unknown
Total valid votes		459	100.00%		
Total rejected ballots					
Turnout		%			

2. Later 14th Premier of British Columbia 1900-1902

9th 1900 British Columbia general election
Party	Candidate	Votes	%	±	Expenditures
Government	Joseph McPhee^{3}	279	45.22%	–	unknown
Opposition	**Lewis Alfred Mounce**	**338**	**54.78%**	–	unknown
Total valid votes		188	100.00%		
Total rejected ballots					
Turnout		%			

3. McPhee was nominated as a Liberal candidate in opposition to Mounce who campaigned as a Conservative Party supporter. According to the Nanaimo Herald both were anti-Martin but the Vancouver Province and Victoria Times listed both as Government.

10th 1903 British Columbia general election
Party	Candidate	Votes	%	±	Expenditures
Conservative	**Robert Grant**	**361**	**53.24%**		unknown
Liberal	Frederick McBain Young	317	46.76%		unknown
Total valid votes		678	100.00%		
Total rejected ballots					
Turnout		%			

11th British Columbia election, 1907
Party	Candidate	Votes	%	±	Expenditures
Liberal	John Bertram Bennett	292	43.98%		unknown
Conservative	**Robert Grant**	**372**	**56.02%**		unknown
Total valid votes		664	100.00%		
Total rejected ballots					
Turnout		%			

12th British Columbia election, 1909
Party	Candidate	Votes	%	±	Expenditures
Socialist	James Cartwright	206	20.96%	–	unknown
Independent Conservative	Henry Essen Young	154	15.67%		
Liberal	James McKelvey Forrest	172	17.50%		unknown
Conservative	**Michael Manson**	**451**	**45.88%**		unknown
Total valid votes		983	100.00%		
Total rejected ballots					
Turnout		%			

13th British Columbia election, 1912
Party	Candidate	Votes	%	±	Expenditures
Socialist	Wallis Walter Lefeaux	355	33.84%	–	unknown
Conservative	**Michael Manson**	**694**	**66.16%**		unknown
Total valid votes		1,049	100.00%		
Total rejected ballots					
Turnout		%			

14th British Columbia election, 1916
Party	Candidate	Votes	%	±	Expenditures
Conservative	Michael Manson	882	41.47%		unknown
Socialist	William Arthur Pritchard	246	11.57%	–	unknown
**Liberal**	**Hugh Stewart**	**916**	**43.07%**		unknown
Social Democratic	George Edgar Winkler	83	3.90%		
Total valid votes		812	100.00%		
Total rejected ballots					
Turnout		%			

15th British Columbia election, 1920
Party	Candidate	Votes	%	±	Expenditures
Conservative	William Edward Anderson	1,233	29.90%		unknown
Independent Liberal	William Wallace Burns McInnes	731	17.73%		
**Peoples Party (Farmer-Labour)**	**Thomas Menzies**	**1,354**	**32.83%**		unknown
Liberal	Patrick Daly	806	19.54%		unknown
Total valid votes		4,124	100.00%		
Total rejected ballots					
Turnout		%			

16th British Columbia election, 1924
Party	Candidate	Votes	%	±	Expenditures
Conservative	William Duncan	815	28.41%		
Provincial	George Every-Clayton	793	27.64%		
**Independent Liberal**	**Paul Phillips Harrison**	**1,261**	**43.95%**		
Total valid votes		2,869	100.00%		

1928 British Columbia general election
Party	Candidate	Votes	%
Conservative	George Kerr McNaughton	2,058	53.85
Liberal	John William McKenzie	1,497	39.17
Independent Labour	William Law	267	6.99
Total valid votes		3,822	100.00
Total rejected ballots		70	

18th British Columbia election, 1933
Party	Candidate	Votes	%	±	Expenditures
Co-operative Commonwealth Fed.	Harold Tuttle Allen	1,590	36.03%		unknown
Independent Co-operative Commonwealth	George Robert Bates	276	6.25%		unknown
**Liberal**	**Laurence Arnold Hanna**	2,204	49.94%		unknown
United Front (Workers and Farmers)	Hugh Gray Russell	259	5.87%		
Independent	Ernest Richard Tarling	84	1.90%		unknown
Total valid votes		4,413	100.00%		
Total rejected ballots		34			
Turnout		%			

19th British Columbia election, 1937
Party	Candidate	Votes	%	±	Expenditures
**Co-operative Commonwealth Fed.**	**Colin Cameron**	**2,336**	**44.83%**		unknown
Liberal	Laurence Arnold Hanna	1,876	36.00%		unknown
Conservative	Gordon Noel Money	999	19.17%		unknown
Total valid votes		5,211	100.00%		
Total rejected ballots		80			
Turnout		%			

20th British Columbia election, 1941
Party	Candidate	Votes	%	±	Expenditures
**Co-operative Commonwealth Fed.**	**Colin Cameron**	**3,126**	**45.31%**		unknown
Liberal	William Edward Mantle	2,158	31.28%		unknown
Conservative	Edward Roger Gibson Richardson	1,615	23.41%		unknown
Total valid votes		6,899	100.00%		
Total rejected ballots		166			
Turnout		%			

21st British Columbia election, 1945
Party	Candidate	Votes	%	±	Expenditures
Co-operative Commonwealth Fed.	Colin Cameron	3,362	44.69%		unknown
Labor-Progressive	Thomas McEwen	729	9.69%		unknown
Coalition	**Herbert John Welch**	**3,432**	**45.62%**	–	unknown
Total valid votes		7,523	100.00%		
Total rejected ballots		161			
Turnout		%			

22nd British Columbia election, 1949
Party	Candidate	Votes	%	±	Expenditures
Co-operative Commonwealth Fed.	Colin Cameron	5,238	40.81%		unknown
Coalition	**Herbert John Welch**	**7,596**	**59.19%**	–	unknown
Total valid votes		12,834	100.00%		
Total rejected ballots		435			
Turnout		%			

23rd British Columbia election, 1952 ^{1}
Party	Candidate	Votes 1st count	%	Votes final count	%	±%	
Progressive Conservative	W. Bruce Gordon	1,868	13.58%	--	--.--%		unknown
**Co-operative Commonwealth Fed.**	**William Campbell Moore**	**5,369**	**39.03%**	7,098	57.67%		unknown
Social Credit League	Cyril Hugh Poole	2,987	21.71%				
Liberal	Herbert John Welch	3,532	25.68%	5,210	42.33%		unknown
Total valid votes		13,756	100.00%	12,308	%		
Total rejected ballots		446					
Turnout		77.94%					
^{1}(Preferential ballot: 1st and 3rd counts of three shown only)

24th British Columbia election, 1953 ^{2}
Party	Candidate	Votes 1st count	%	Votes final count	%	±%	
Liberal	John Wesley Baikie	2,944	21.71%	-	-.-%		unknown
Labour Progressive Party	John Higgin	357	2.63%	-	-.-%		unknown
**Co-operative Commonwealth Fed.**	**William Campbell Moore**	**5,462**	**40.28%**	6,717	53.83%		unknown
Social Credit League	Cyril Hugh Poole	4,420	32.59%	5,762	46.17%		
Progressive Conservative	Nugent Watson Spinks	378	2.79%	--	--.--%		unknown
Total valid votes		13,561	100.00%	12,479	%		
Total rejected ballots		717					
Turnout		77.94%					
^{2}Preferential ballot: 1st and 4th counts of four shown only)

25th British Columbia election, 1956
Party	Candidate	Votes	%	±	Expenditures
Social Credit	**Daniel Robert John Campbell**	**4,916**	**41.63%**	–	unknown
Liberal	Robert George McPhee	2,339	19.81%		unknown
Co-operative Commonwealth Fed.	Cyril Newman	4,555	38.57%		unknown
Total valid votes		11,810	100.00%		
Total valid votes		11,810	100.00%		
Total rejected ballots		183			
Turnout		%			

26th British Columbia election, 1960
Party	Candidate	Votes	%	±	Expenditures
Liberal	William Wallace Baikie	2,759	17.47%		unknown
Social Credit	**Daniel Robert John Campbell**	**6,100**	**38.63%**	–	unknown
Progressive Conservative	Alan Gray	653	4.14%		unknown
Communist	John Higgin	207	1.31%		unknown
Co-operative Commonwealth Fed.	Frederick Charles Wood	6,072	38.45%		unknown
Total valid votes		15,791	100.00%		
Total rejected ballots		248			
Turnout		%			

27th British Columbia election, 1963
Party	Candidate	Votes	%	±	Expenditures
Social Credit	**Daniel Robert John Campbell**	**6,598**	**42.38%**	–	unknown
Liberal	David Alexander Elrix	1,259	8.09%		unknown
Progressive Conservative	Duncan McIntyre Fraser	1,475	9.47%		unknown
New Democratic	Frederick Sidney Williams	6,238	40.06%		unknown
Total valid votes		15,570	100.00%		
Total rejected ballots		150			
Turnout		%			

28th British Columbia election, 1966
Party	Candidate	Votes	%	±	Expenditures
Social Credit	**Daniel Robert John Campbell**	**5,449**	**49.39%**	–	unknown
Liberal	Joseph J. Cvetkovich	1,276	11.57%		unknown
New Democratic	Neville Shanks	4,308	39.05%		unknown
Total valid votes		11,033	100.00%		
Total rejected ballots		104			
Turnout		%			

29th British Columbia election, 1969
Party	Candidate	Votes	%	±	Expenditures
Social Credit	**Daniel Robert John Campbell**	**7,910**	**45.61%**	–	unknown
Liberal	Olga Ruth Henrietta Chown	2,303	13.28%		unknown
New Democratic	Harry Harris	7,131	41.12%		unknown
Total valid votes		17,344	100.00%		
Total rejected ballots		194			
Turnout		%			

30th British Columbia election, 1972
Party	Candidate	Votes	%	±	Expenditures
Social Credit	Daniel Robert John Campbell	6,376	29.00%	–	unknown
Progressive Conservative	Lawrence Foort	1,166	5.30%		unknown
New Democratic	**Karen Elizabeth Sanford**	**12,540**	**57.40%**		unknown
Liberal	Patrick Melvin Thompson	1,903	8.66%		unknown
Total valid votes		21,985	100.00%		
Total rejected ballots		135			
Turnout		%			

31st British Columbia election, 1975
Party	Candidate	Votes	%	±	Expenditures
Social Credit	Daniel Edgard Hanuse	10,171	38.90%	–	unknown
Liberal	Norman L. McLaren	1,381	5.28%		unknown
New Democratic	**Karen Elizabeth Sanford**	10,650	40.73%		unknown
Progressive Conservative	Victor Albert Stephens	3,906	15.09%		unknown
Total valid votes		26,148	100.00%		
Total rejected ballots		454			
Turnout		%			

32nd British Columbia election, 1979
Party	Candidate	Votes	%	±	Expenditures
Social Credit	Delbert Keith Doll	9,390	42.57%	–	unknown
Progressive Conservative	Eric Harry Kellow	2,251	10.20%		unknown
New Democratic	**Karen Elizabeth Sanford**	**10,420**	**47.23%**		unknown
Total valid votes		22,061	100.00%		
Total rejected ballots		315			
Turnout		%			

33rd British Columbia election, 1983
Party	Candidate	Votes	%	±	Expenditures
Liberal	Thomas John Finnie	502	1.71%		unknown
Western Canada Concept	Allan Wayne Griffiths	1,104	3.75%		unknown
New Democratic	**Karen Elizabeth Sanford**	**13,719**	**46.58%**		unknown
Social Credit	George Herbert Parke Smith	13,422	45.57%	–	unknown
Independent	Victor Albert Stephens	705	2.39%		unknown
Total valid votes		29,452	100.00%		
Total rejected ballots		258			
Turnout		%			

44th British Columbia election, 1986
Party	Candidate	Votes	%	±	Expenditures
Social Credit	**Stanley Brian Hagen**	**15,833**	**51.15**		
New Democratic	Karen Elizabeth Sanford	13,562	43.82%		unknown
Liberal	John G. (Jack) Setter	985	3.18%		unknown
Progressive Conservative	Terry Ian	573	1.85%		unknown
Total valid votes		30,953	100.00%		
Total rejected ballots		276			
Turnout		%			

== Sources ==
Elections BC historical returns
