= Patrick Crofton =

Canadian politician

Member of the Canadian Parliament for Esquimalt—Saanich
- In office 1984–1988
- Preceded by: Donald W. Munro

Personal details
- Born: 29 May 1935 Ganges, British Columbia, Canada
- Died: 5 January 2016 (aged 80) Victoria, British Columbia, Canada
- Party: Progressive Conservative

Patrick Dermott Crofton (29 May 1935 – 5 January 2016) was a Canadian politician, businessman and farmer. Crofton served as a Progressive Conservative party member of the House of Commons of Canada.

Crofton was first elected at the riding of Esquimalt—Saanich and served in the 33rd Canadian Parliament. In the 1988 federal election, following changes to riding boundaries, he was defeated at the Saanich—Gulf Islands riding by Lynn Hunter of the New Democratic Party. He died in 2016 at the age of 80.
