= Cowichan—Malahat—The Islands =

Former federal electoral district in British Columbia, Canada

British Columbia electoral district

Defunct federal electoral district
- Legislature: House of Commons
- District created: 1979
- District abolished: 1988
- First contested: 1979
- Last contested: 1984

Cowichan—Malahat—The Islands was a federal electoral district in British Columbia, Canada, that was represented in the House of Commons of Canada from 1979 to 1988. This riding was created in 1976 from parts of Nanaimo—Cowichan—The Islands and Esquimalt—Saanich ridings.

It was abolished in 1987 when it was redistributed into Esquimalt—Juan de Fuca, Nanaimo—Cowichan and Saanich—Gulf Islands ridings.

== Members of Parliament ==
Parliament	Years	Member	Party
Riding created from Nanaimo—Cowichan—The Islands and Esquimalt—Saanich
31st	1979–1980	Don L. Taylor	Progressive Conservative
32nd	1980–1984	James Manly	New Democratic
33rd	1984–1988	James Manly	New Democratic
Riding dissolved into Esquimalt—Juan de Fuca, Nanaimo—Cowichan and Saanich—Gulf Islands

== Election results ==
=== 1984 ===
1984 Canadian federal election
Party	Candidate	Votes	%	±%
New Democratic	James Manly	24,555	45.06	–3.11
Progressive Conservative	Don L. Taylor	22,964	42.14	+2.67
Liberal	Michael Garland Coleman	5,899	10.82	–0.40
Green	Lindsay Armstrong	387	0.71	–
Libertarian	James Taylor	313	0.57	–
Confederation of Regions	R.L. Snell	257	0.47	–
Independent	John Currie	62	0.11	–
Independent	Ronald William Jackson	61	0.11	–
Total valid votes		54,498	99.74	
Total rejected ballots		141	0.26	+0.10
Turnout		54,639	79.47	+4.70
Eligible voters		68,755		
New Democratic hold		Swing		–2.88
Source: Elections Canada

=== 1980 ===
1980 Canadian federal election
Party	Candidate	Votes	%	±%
New Democratic	James Manly	22,154	48.16	+8.19
Progressive Conservative	Don L. Taylor	18,153	39.47	–4.07
Liberal	Léo Gervais	5,161	11.22	–4.97
Rhinoceros	Louis Crowbird (James) Lesosky	444	0.97	–
Communist	Ernest (Ernie) Leon Knott	85	0.18	+0.00
Total valid votes		45,997	99.84	
Total rejected ballots		74	0.16	–0.01
Turnout		46,071	74.77	–0.43
Eligible voters		61,620		
New Democratic gain from Progressive Conservative		Swing		+6.12
Source: Elections Canada

=== 1979 ===
1979 Canadian federal election
Party	Candidate	Votes	%	±%
Progressive Conservative	Don L. Taylor	19,025	43.53	–
New Democratic	James Manly	17,471	39.98	–
Liberal	David Anderson	7,075	16.19	–
Communist	Ernest (Ernie) Leon Knott	82	0.19	–
Marxist–Leninist	Allan H. Bezanson	51	0.12	–
Total valid votes		43,704	99.83	
Total rejected ballots		76	0.17	–
Turnout		43,780	75.20	–
Eligible voters		58,218		
This riding was created from Nanaimo—Cowichan—The Islands and Esquimalt—Saanich, which elected a New Democrat and a Progressive Conservative, respectively, in the last election.
Source: Elections Canada

== See also ==
- List of Canadian electoral districts
- Historical federal electoral districts of Canada
