= Ronald Alexander =

Ronald Alexander may refer to:

- Ronald Alexander (playwright) (1917–1995), American playwright
- Ronald Alexander (badminton) (born 1993), Indonesian badminton player
- Ronald Okeden Alexander (1888–1949), military officer in the Canadian army
- Ron Alexander (born 1950), Australian rules footballer
