= James Dunsmuir =

British Columbian industrialist and politician (1851–1920)

The Honourable James Dunsmuir
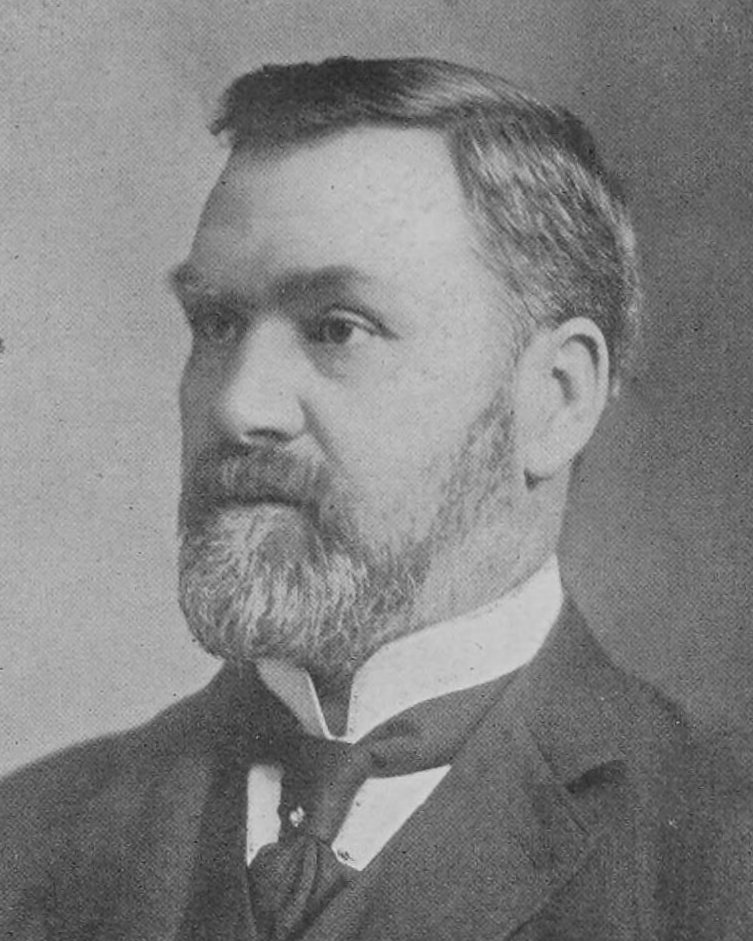

14th Premier of British Columbia
- In office June 15, 1900 – November 21, 1902
- Monarchs: Victoria; Edward VII
- Lieutenant Governor: Thomas Robert McInnes; Henri-Gustave Joly de Lotbinière
- Preceded by: Joseph Martin
- Succeeded by: Edward Gawler Prior

8th Lieutenant Governor of British Columbia
- In office May 11, 1906 – December 3, 1909
- Monarch: Edward VII
- Governor General: The Earl Grey
- Premier: Richard McBride
- Preceded by: Henri-Gustave Joly de Lotbinière
- Succeeded by: Thomas Wilson Paterson

MLA for Comox
- In office July 9, 1898 – June 9, 1900
- Preceded by: Joseph Hunter
- Succeeded by: Lewis Alfred Mounce

MLA for South Nanaimo
- In office June 9, 1900 – October 3, 1903
- Preceded by: Ralph Smith
- Succeeded by: district abolished

Personal details
- Born: July 8, 1851 Fort Vancouver, Washington
- Died: June 6, 1920 (aged 68) Cowichan Bay, British Columbia
- Party: No party affiliation
- Spouse: Laura Miller Surles (m. 1876)
- Children: 3 sons and 9 daughters
- Parent: Robert Dunsmuir (father)
- Education: Virginia Tech
- Occupation: Industrialist and politician

James Dunsmuir (July 8, 1851 – June 6, 1920) was a Canadian industrialist and politician in British Columbia. He served as the 14th premier of British Columbia from 1900 to 1902 and the eighth lieutenant governor of British Columbia from 1906 to 1909.

== Early life and business career ==
Son of Robert Dunsmuir, he was heir to his family's coal fortune. The Dunsmuir family dominated the province's economy in the late nineteenth century and was a leading force in opposing organized labour. Dunsmuir managed his family's coal business from 1876 until 1910, increasing profits and violently putting down efforts to unionize.

In 1905, he sold his Esquimalt and Nanaimo Railway to the Canadian Pacific Railway. In 1910, he sold his coal mining companies, Union Colliery of British Columbia and R. Dunsmuir & Sons, to Canadian Collieries (Dunsmuir) Ltd (CCD).

== Opposition to organized labour ==
In the 42 years that the Dunsmuirs owned the collieries, they never recognized their employees' attempts to unionize or create better working conditions. Dunsmuir used threats, spies, blacklists and scab labour to break strikes. When he could not break a strike with scab labour, he used his influence to have the provincial government call in the militia. Dunsmuir stated to a royal commission, "I object to all unions...They simply take the management of the mine...I want the management of my own works, and if I recognize the union, I cannot have that."

Dunsmuir provoked further rage when he ordered workers to relocate their homes at a new pit. Workers also resented low wages and the dangerous conditions that Dunsmuir imposed upon them. Mine owners at the time regularly ignored safety and sanitary conditions, and provincial inspectors were slow to bring them to justice.

Dunsmuir contributed to the mines of British Columbia being among the most dangerous in the world. Between 1889 and 1908, twenty-three men were killed in the production of every million tons of BC coal; the average for North America as a whole was six deaths per million tons. In 1901, while serving as Premier, many men perished in his collieries.

== Political career ==
Dunsmuir entered provincial politics in 1898, winning a seat in the provincial legislature, and he became the 14th Premier in 1900. His government attempted to resist popular pressure to curtail Asian labour and immigration, not for humanitarian reasons, but to ensure a cheap labour pool for business. It also promoted railway construction and accomplished a redistribution of seats to better represent population distribution in the province.

Dunsmuir visited England and the United States in 1902, but disliked politics after his return and resigned as Premier in November 1902. In 1906, he became the province's eighth Lieutenant Governor. He retired in 1909 and lived out his remaining years at the baronial mansion that he had constructed at Hatley Park.

== Legacy ==
Dunsmuir founded the town of Ladysmith, British Columbia. Hatley Castle, the Edwardian mansion and gardens where he spent his last years is now a Classified Federal Heritage Building on the Canadian Register of Historic Places.

One of his daughters, Jessie Muriel, married, as her first husband, the couturier Edward Molyneux. His second-born son, James A. Dunsmuir Jr., died in the sinking of the RMS Lusitania in 1915. His last child, Dola Dunsmuir, married Lieutenant-Commander Henry Cavendish and was rumored to be Tallulah Bankhead's lover.

He is interred in the Ross Bay Cemetery in Victoria, British Columbia.

== Gallery ==
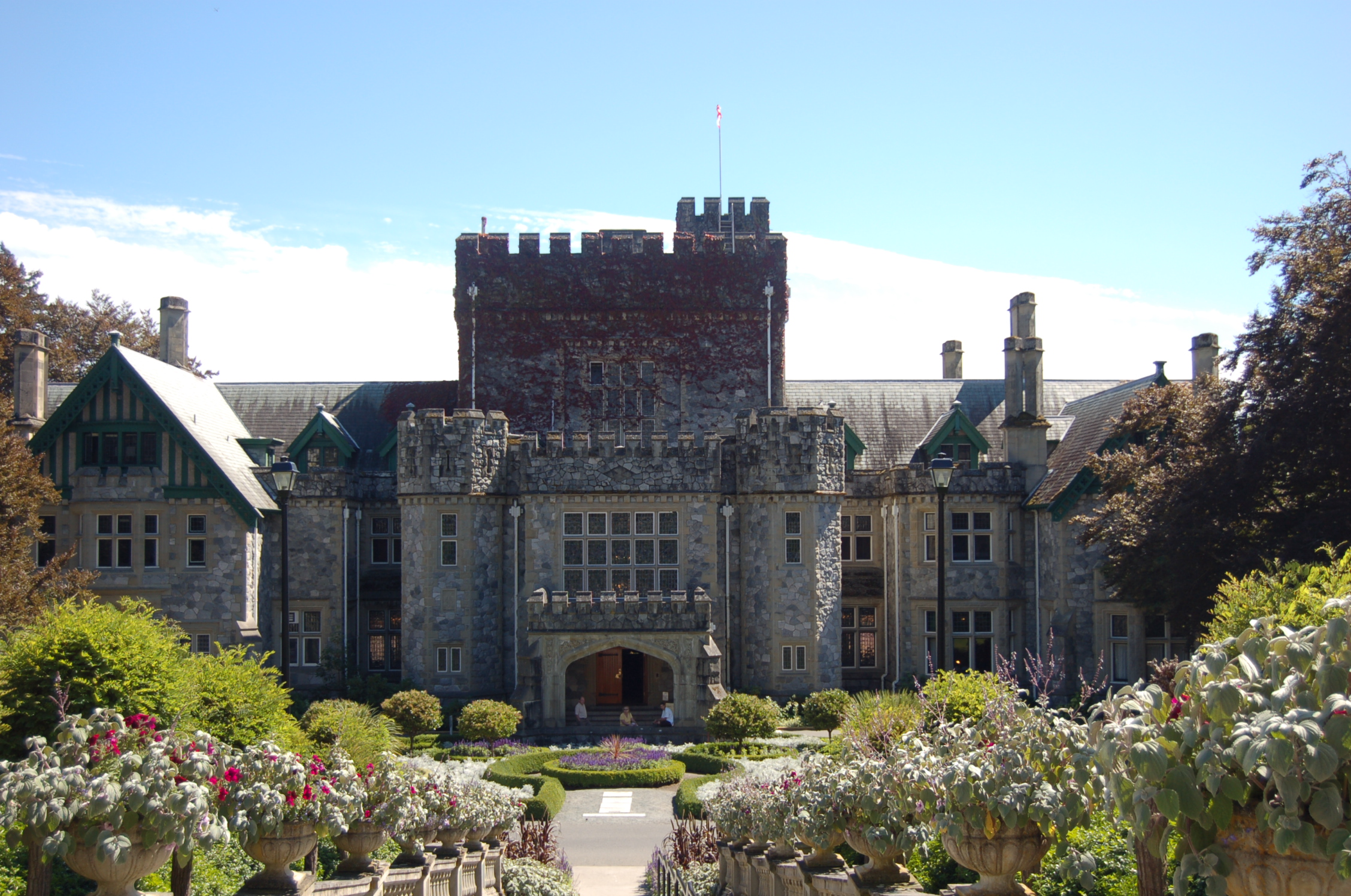
Hatley Castle, c. 2006

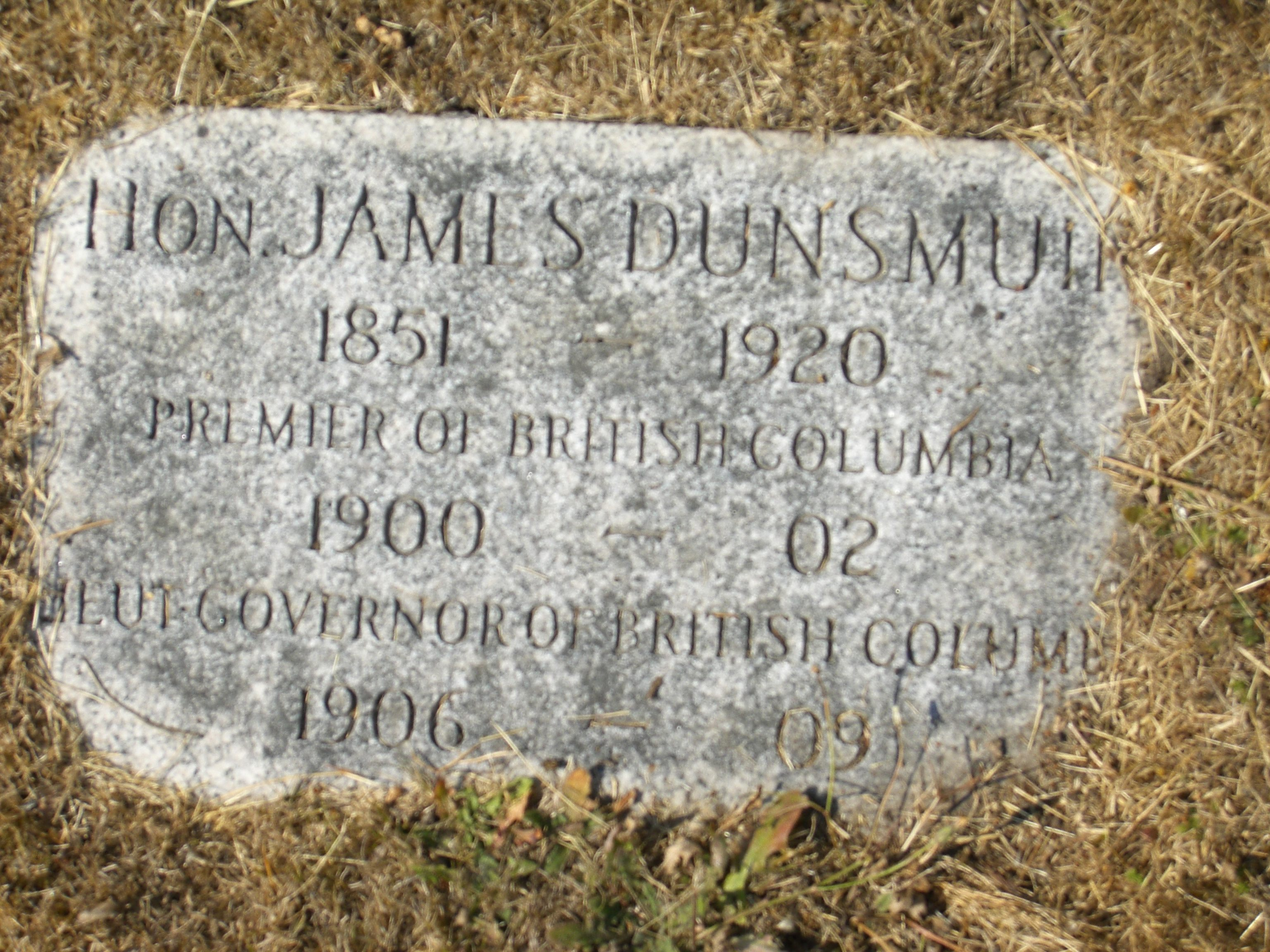
Gravestone of James Dunsmuir at Ross Bay Cemetery in Victoria

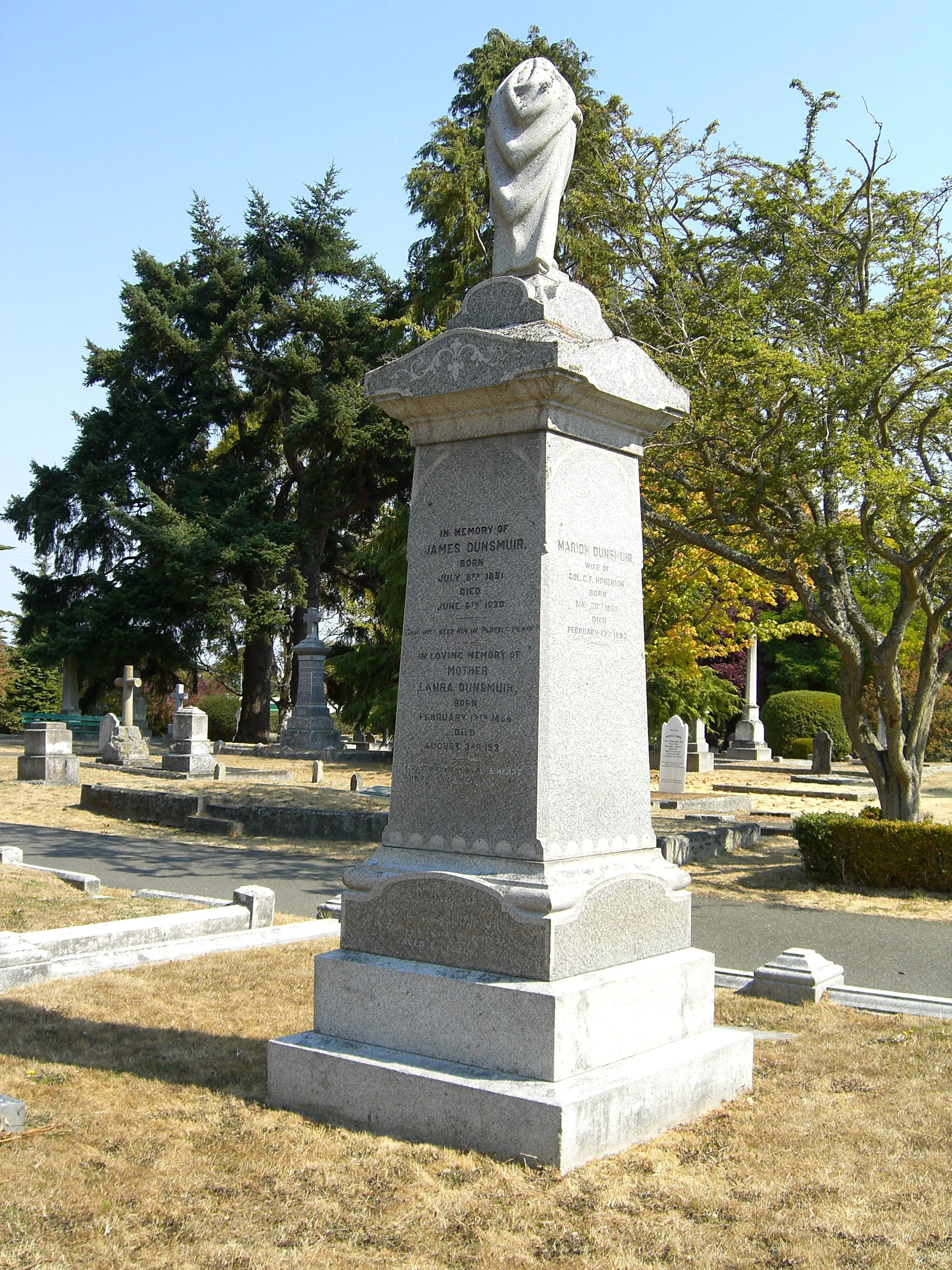
Dunsmuir family monument at Ross Bay Cemetery in Victoria
