= James Samuel Taylor =

Canadian politician, printer and publisher

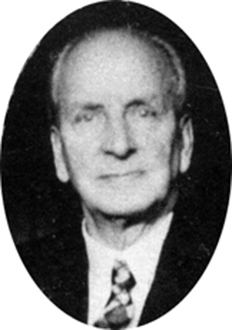

Member of the Canadian Parliament for Nanaimo
- In office 1935–1940
- Preceded by: Charles Dickie
- Succeeded by: Alan Chambers

Personal details
- Born: January 20, 1872 Liverpool, England
- Died: December 22, 1960 (aged 88)
- Party: CCF (1935–1937); Independent (1937–1940)

James Samuel (J.S.) Taylor (January 20, 1872 – December 22, 1960) was a Canadian politician, printer and publisher.

Born in Liverpool, England, Taylor immigrated to British Columbia settling in Nanaimo.

In 1935 he was one of the first MPs elected to the House of Commons of Canada under the Co-operative Commonwealth Federation banner representing Nanaimo riding.

He had strong interests in astrology and numerology and did not fit in well with other members of the CCF caucus and was once described by M.J. Coldwell as "A very queer duck, indeed".

By early 1937, Taylor had left the CCF caucus and was sitting as an Independent MP and is described by Stewart as having "jumped to the Liberals". though he never formally adopted that designation. Taylor did not run for re-election in 1940 and returned to private life.

== Sources ==
- James Samuel Taylor – Parliament of Canada biography
