= Charles Dickie =

Canadian politician (1859–1947)

Member of the Legislative Assembly of British Columbia for Cowichan
- In office 1900–1903
- Preceded by: Theodore Davie
- Succeeded by: John Newell Evans

Member of Parliament for Nanaimo
- In office December 1921 – October 1935
- Preceded by: John Charles McIntosh
- Succeeded by: James Samuel Taylor

Personal details
- Born: Charles Herbert Dickie; 14 September 1859 Beachville, Canada West
- Died: 16 September 1947 (aged 88)
- Party: Conservative
- Spouse(s): 1) Eliza E. Calvert m. 22 September 1888 (died 1926); 2) Edith (Bennett) Collings m. 19 April 1930
- Profession: lumberman, miner, railway employee

Charles Herbert Dickie (14 September 1859 – 16 September 1947) was a Conservative member of the House of Commons of Canada. He was born in Beachville, Canada West and became a lumberman, miner and railway employee.

Dickie attended schools at Beachville and at Ann Arbor, Michigan. He was a Conservative provincial politician at the Cowichan riding from 1900 until his retirement at the 1903 provincial election.

He was elected to Parliament at the Nanaimo electoral district riding in the 1921 general election then re-elected there in 1925, 1926 and 1930. Dickie was defeated in the 1935 federal election by James Samuel Taylor of the Co-operative Commonwealth Federation.
