= George Pearkes =

Canadian politician and soldier (1888–1984)

Major-General The Honourable George Randolph Pearkes VC PC CC CB DSO MC CD
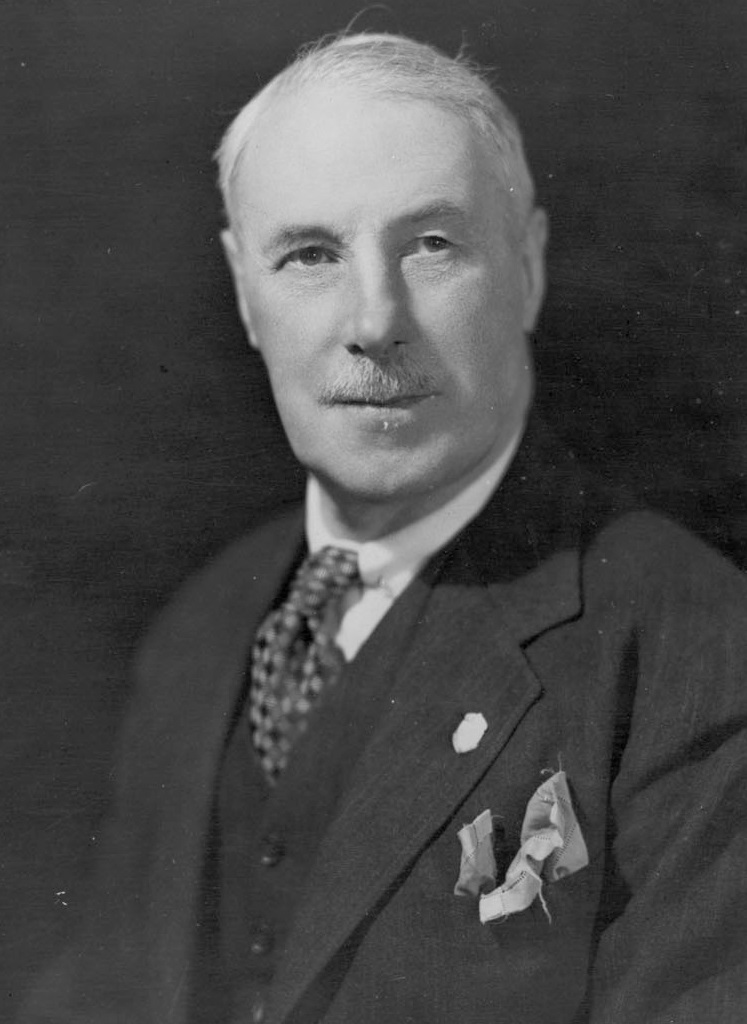

20th Lieutenant Governor of British Columbia
- In office 12 October 1960 – 2 July 1968
- Monarch: Elizabeth II
- Governors General: Georges Vanier; Roland Michener
- Premier: W.A.C. Bennett
- Preceded by: Frank Mackenzie Ross
- Succeeded by: John Robert Nicholson

Minister of National Defence
- In office 21 June 1957 – 10 October 1960
- Prime Minister: John Diefenbaker
- Preceded by: Ralph Campney
- Succeeded by: Douglas Harkness

Member of Parliament for Esquimalt—Saanich
- In office 10 August 1953 – 10 October 1960
- Preceded by: Alan Chambers
- Succeeded by: George Chatterton

Member of Parliament for Nanaimo
- In office 11 June 1945 – 9 August 1953
- Preceded by: Alan Chambers
- Succeeded by: Colin Cameron

Personal details
- Born: 28 February 1888 Watford, Hertfordshire, England
- Died: 30 May 1984 (aged 96) Victoria, British Columbia, Canada

Military service
- Allegiance: Canada
- Branch/service: Canadian Expeditionary Force; Permanent Active Militia; Canadian Army
- Years of service: 1915–1945
- Rank: Major-General
- Commands: Pacific Command; Canadian Corps; 1st Canadian Infantry Division; 2nd Canadian Infantry Brigade; 13th Military District
- Battles/wars: First World War: Western Front; Battle of Passchendaele; Second World War: Aleutian Islands campaign
- Awards: Victoria Cross; Companion of the Order of Canada; Companion of the Order of the Bath; Distinguished Service Order; Military Cross; Mentioned in Despatches; Canadian Forces' Decoration; Croix de Guerre (France); Legion of Merit (United States)

Major-General George Randolph Pearkes VC PC CC CB DSO MC CD (28 February 1888 – 30 May 1984) was a Canadian politician and soldier. He was a recipient of the Victoria Cross, the highest award for gallantry in the face of the enemy awarded to British and Imperial forces for actions taken during the First World War. He served as the 20th lieutenant governor of British Columbia.

== Early life ==
Born in England in Watford, Hertfordshire, on 28 February 1888, he was the oldest child of Louise and George Pearkes and attended Berkhamsted School. In 1906, he and his brother emigrated to Alberta, Canada, where they settled near Red Deer. In 1911, George joined the Royal North-West Mounted Police and served in Yukon until the outbreak of the First World War in August 1914.

A comprehensive biography of Pearkes was written during his lifetime by Reginald Roy, based on 82 one-to-two-hour tape recorded interviews and considerable primary and secondary sources.

== Military career ==
=== First World War and Victoria Cross ===
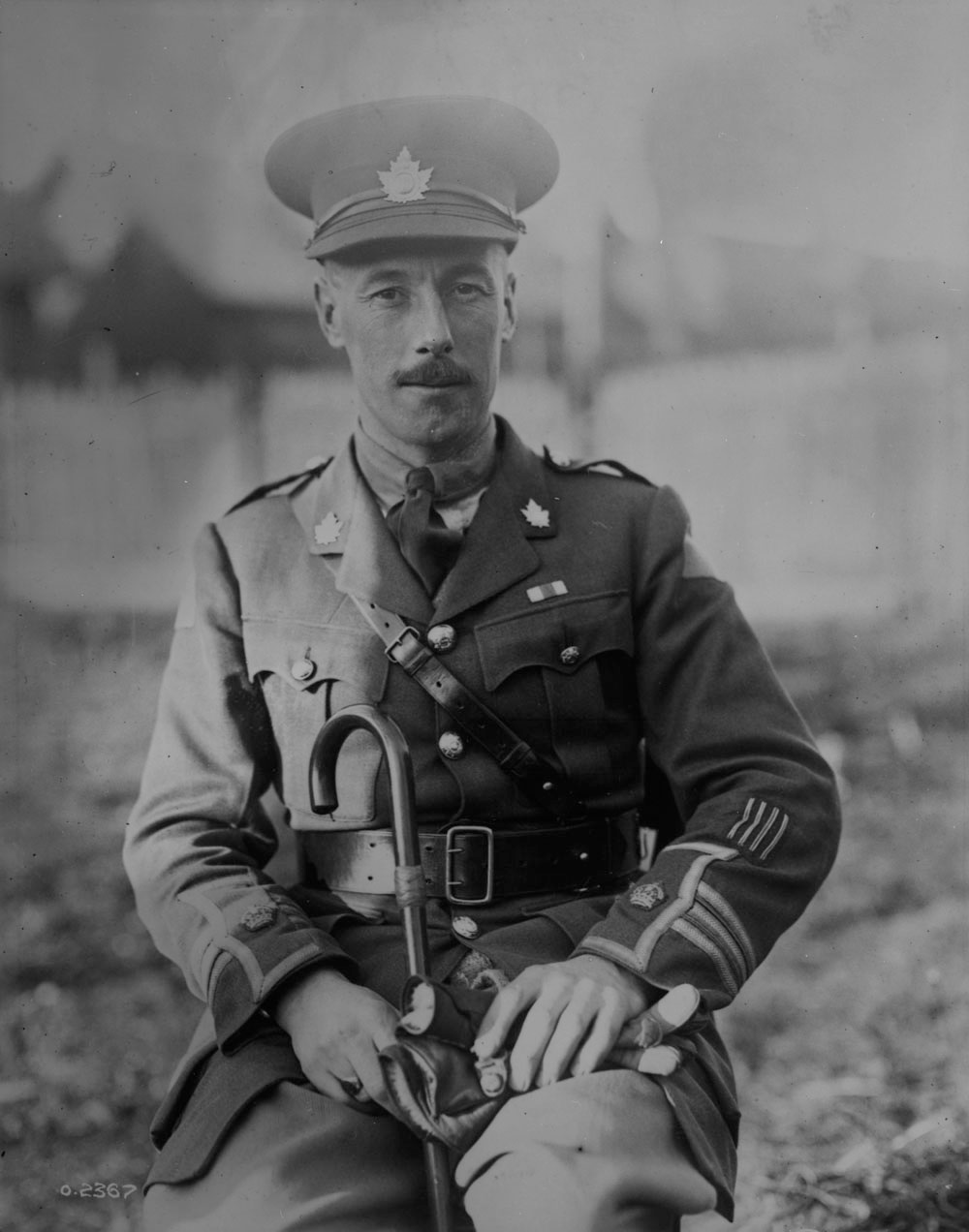
Pearkes in December 1917

In 1915, Pearkes enlisted in the Canadian Expeditionary Force 2nd Regiment, Canadian Mounted Rifles; transferring in September 1916 to the 5th Battalion Canadian Mounted Rifles. In the photo obtained from Library and Archives Canada (PA-002310) dated December 1917, Major Pearkes, 5th Canadian Mounted Rifles, is shown wearing the Military Cross service ribbon, but has not yet received the ribbon for the Victoria Cross. He is wearing four wound stripes on his sleeve.

Pearkes was 29 years old, and an acting major during the Battle of Passchendaele when the following deed took place for which he was awarded the Victoria Cross (VC):

For most conspicuous bravery and skilful handling of the troops under his command during the capture and consolidation of considerably more than the objectives allotted to him, in an attack. Just prior to the advance Major Pearkes was wounded in the thigh. Regardless of his wound, he continued to lead his men with the utmost gallantry, despite many obstacles.

At a particular stage of the attack his further advance was threatened by a strong point which was an objective of the battalion on his left, but which they had not succeeded in capturing. Quickly appreciating the situation, he captured and held this point, thus enabling his further advance to be successfully pushed forward.

It was entirely due to his determination and fearless personality that he was able to maintain his objective with the small number of men at his command against repeated enemy counter-attacks, both his flanks being unprotected for a considerable depth meanwhile.

His appreciation of the situation throughout and the reports rendered by him were invaluable to his commanding officer in making dispositions of troops to hold the position captured.

He showed throughout a supreme contempt of danger and wonderful powers of control and leading.

During the war, he was promoted to lieutenant-colonel. Aside from the VC, Pearkes was also awarded the Distinguished Service Order (DSO) and the Military Cross (MC).

=== Between the wars ===
Following the First World War he became a career officer in the army, and went to England in April 1919 to attend the Staff College, Camberley, for the first post-war course there. Among his fellow students there were Ronald Okeden Alexander, Bernard Freyberg, Alan Brooke, John Gort and Percy Hobart, all of whom would rise to high rank, as would John Dill, one of the instructors.

Upon his return to Canada, Pearkes was then appointed to Princess Patricia's Canadian Light Infantry (PPCLI), one of the three infantry regiments of the regular Canadian Army, also known as the Permanent Active Militia (PAM) or the Permanent Force (PF). During the 1920s and early 1930s he was stationed as a staff officer in Winnipeg, Manitoba, and in Calgary, Alberta. He also served as staff officer at the Royal Military College of Canada in Kingston, Ontario. In 1925 Pearkes married Constance Blytha Copeman, and they had two children.

In 1936, he attended the Imperial Defence College in London. Among his fellow students there were Frank McNamara and Sydney Rowell, both from Australia; other students included William Slim and Keith Park.

From 1938 to 1940 he was District Officer Commanding 13th Military District in Calgary. With the opening of hostilities with Germany in the Second World War, Brigadier Pearkes was given command of the 2nd Canadian Infantry Brigade, a component of the 1st Canadian Infantry Division, which comprised a number of units raised in western Canada.

=== Second World War ===
In December 1939, Pearkes, by then age 51, and his staff left for England where the 1st Division, commanded by Major General Andrew McNaughton, was finally concentrated in a single place as a formation. In February 1940 he developed a serious case of spinal meningitis and it was feared that he might die, with the situation becoming so serious that his wife and son were sent to England from Canada. Miraculously, however, he managed to recover and, in fact, met his wife and son upon their arrival.

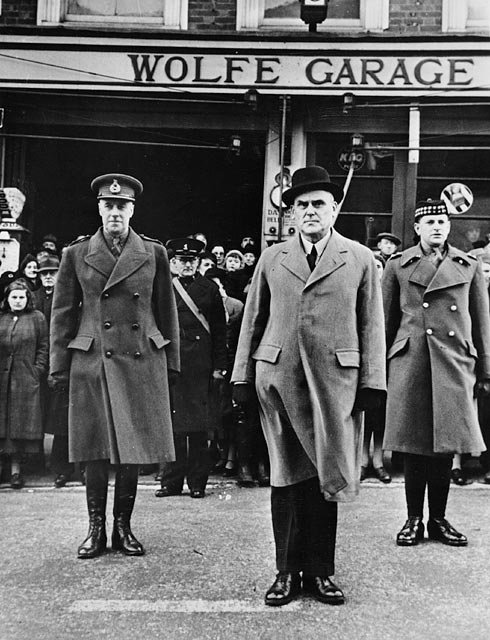
From left to right: Major-General George Pearkes, VC and C. D. Howe, during memorial service for General James Wolfe, 1 January 1941

In July 1940, after the surrender of France, Pearkes succeeded McNaughton in command of the 1st Canadian Infantry Division. n November 1941 Pearkes was asked to assume temporary command of the expanding Canadian Corps, taking the place of McNaughton who was on an extended leave. Lieutenant-General Bernard Montgomery of the British Army, whose opinions of Canadian officers were crucial in the careers of senior officers overseas in the mid-war period, said Pearkes was a "gallant soldier" albeit one who, in his opinion, possessed, "little brains."

In August 1942 Pearkes was returned to Canada and became General Officer Commanding in Chief Pacific Command, primarily a home defence organization for western Canada. He oversaw defences on Canada's West Coast.

In 1943 Pearkes was part of the planning for Operation Greenlight, retaking the Aleutian Islands from the Japanese.

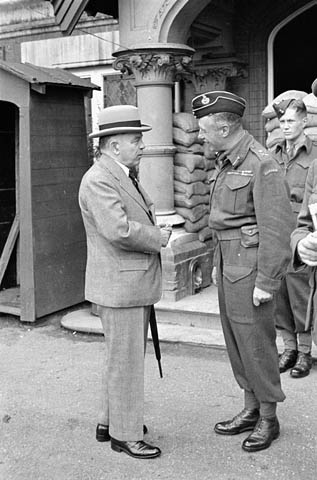
The Canadian Prime Minister, William Lyon Mackenzie King, talking with Major-General George Pearkes during a visit to the 1st Canadian Infantry Division, 26 August 1941

In 1944, Pearkes was instrumental in suppressing the Terrace Mutiny, a revolt by conscripts stationed in Terrace, British Columbia, resulting from the announcement that conscripts would be deployed overseas. Although successful, Pearkes was extremely critical of the actions that led to it in the first place, stating he had been placed in the "intolerable position of being ordered to enforce a policy which his past experience gained in applying similar policies has proven ruinous to discipline of [troops], and of being in an utterly dishonourable position, and [Pearkes said] that he will NOT issue instructions to his [junior commanders] placing them in an impossible situation."

When it became clear that the government was not considering deploying troops for the fighting in the Pacific, Pearkes requested a change of command, or to be allowed to retire. The Cabinet War Committee eventually decided on the latter, and he retired from the Army in February 1945. He went into federal politics, winning the Nanaimo, British Columbia, riding for the Progressive Conservative Party.

== Political career ==
In the 1945 federal election, he was elected as a Progressive Conservative Party candidate in the riding of Nanaimo, British Columbia. He was re-elected in 1949. In the 1953 election, he was elected in the riding of Esquimalt—Saanich, British Columbia. He was re-elected in the 1957 and 1958 elections.

He was Minister of National Defence from 1957 to 1960 under Prime Minister John Diefenbaker. In 1958, Pearkes recommended that the Avro Arrow programme be cancelled. In a historic turning point for Canadian aviation, the costly programme was cancelled in 1959 in favour of a less costly reliance on missile defense with NORAD. He resigned from federal politics in 1960.

== Lieutenant governor and later life ==
He became Lieutenant Governor of British Columbia on 13 October 1960, and became one of the few Lieutenant Governors to agree to an extended term, serving until July 1968.

In 1967, he was made a Companion of the Order of Canada. Pearkes died on 30 May 1984, in Victoria, British Columbia, and is commemorated at the Holy Trinity Cemetery, West Saanich, Sidney, Victoria, British Columbia, Canada. Section 4 – West. His Victoria Cross is displayed at the Canadian War Museum in Ottawa.

== Family ==
In August 1925, he married Constance Blytha Copeman. A daughter, Priscilla Edith ("Pep"), was born in 1928 though she died while still a young child. A son, John Andre, was born in 1931.

== Legacy ==
Pearkes' name has been honoured in various ways, including:

- George R. Pearkes Arena in Saanich, British Columbia.
- Mount Pearkes, along the mainland British Columbia south coast.
- The George R. Pearkes Children's Foundation
- The George R. Pearkes Centre for Children, a treatment facility for children with cerebral palsy, now part of the Queen Alexandra Centre for Children's Health in Victoria, British Columbia.
- General George R. Pearkes Elementary School in Hudson's Hope, British Columbia.
- The George R. Pearkes Building which houses the Canadian Department of National Defence Headquarters, in Ottawa.
- The George R. Pearkes, VC Branch of the Royal Canadian Legion in Summerside, Prince Edward Island.
- CCGS George R. Pearkes, a Canadian Coast Guard icebreaker.
- There are numerous thoroughfares named for him.

He donated a ceremonial sword to Berkhamsted School in Berkhamsted, Hertfordshire to be awarded each year to the school's best senior NCO cadet.

== Honours and awards ==
Major-General George Pearkes received numerous awards during his life, including the following.

Ribbon	Description	Notes
	Victoria Cross (VC)	1917
	Order of Canada (CC)	Companion; 1967
	Order of the Bath (CB)	Companion
	Distinguished Service Order (DSO)	1919
	Military Cross (MC)	1918
	Order of St John (KStJ)	Knight of Grace
	1914-15 Star	
	British War Medal	
	World War I Victory Medal	With MID Oakleaf
	Defence Medal	
	Canadian Volunteer Service Medal	With Overseas Clasp
	War Medal 1939–1945	
	King George V Silver Jubilee Medal	1935
	King George VI Coronation Medal	1937
	Queen Elizabeth II Coronation Medal	1953
	Canadian Centennial Medal	1967
	Queen Elizabeth II Silver Jubilee Medal	1977; Both UK and Canadian versions of this medal
	Canadian Forces' Decoration (CD)	3 Clasps; 42 years service in the Canadian Forces
	Croix de Guerre	1914–1918; French version; With Palme; Awarded in 1919
	Legion of Merit	1942; Degree of Commander; From United States of America

He was sworn in as a Member of the Queen's Privy Council for Canada on 21 June 1957. This gave Him the right to use the honorific prefix "The Honourable" and the post nominal letters "PC" for life.

He received the Key to the City of:

- North Vancouver in British Columbia on 21 March 1966.
- Burnaby in British Columbia on 14 June 1968.
- Vancouver in British Columbia on 27 August 1968.

He received the Freedom of the City of:

- Nelson in British Columbia, 1961.
- Port Alberni in British Columbia on 26 October 1967.
- Kelowna in British Columbia, 1967.
- Central Saanich in British Columbia, 1970.
- Vernon in British Columbia, 1970.
- Penticton in British Columbia, 1973.

He also received the Order of the Dogwood in 1968.

=== Honorary degrees ===
- He received honorary degrees from many universities including

Honorary degrees

Location	Date	School	Degree	Gave commencement address
British Columbia	October 1944	University of British Columbia	Doctor of Laws (LL.D)	
British Columbia	May 1965	University of Victoria	Doctor of Laws (LL.D)	
British Columbia	1965	Simon Fraser University	Doctor of Laws (LL.D)	
Ontario	31 May 1976	Royal Military College of Canada	Doctor of Military Science (DMSc)	

== Bibliography ==
- Buzzell, Nora, ed. (1997). The Register of the Victoria Cross. Cheltenham, Gloucestershire: This England Alma House. ISBN 0-906324-27-0.
- Granatstein, Jack (2005). The Generals: The Canadian Army's Senior Commanders in the Second World War. University of Calgary Press. ISBN 978-1-55238-176-2.
- Roy, Reginald Herbert (2011). For Most Conspicuous Bravery: A Biography of Major-General George R. Pearkes, V.C., through Two World Wars. University of British Columbia Press. ISBN 9780774845168.
- VCs of the First World War: Passchendaele 1917
- Victoria Crosses on the Western Front, 31st July 1917–6th November 1917: Third Ypres 1917

Military offices
Preceded by Andrew McNaughton	GOC 1st Canadian Infantry Division; 1940–1942	Succeeded by Harry Salmon
Preceded by Ronald Alexander	GOC-in-C Pacific Command; 1942–1945	Succeeded by Frank Worthington
