= Nanaimo—Cowichan—The Islands =

Former federal electoral district in British Columbia, Canada

British Columbia electoral district

Defunct federal electoral district
- Legislature: House of Commons
- District created: 1962
- District abolished: 1979
- First contested: 1962
- Last contested: 1974

Nanaimo—Cowichan—The Islands was a federal electoral district—also known as a "riding"—in British Columbia, Canada, that was represented in the House of Commons of Canada from 1962 to 1979.

This riding was created in 1962 from Nanaimo. The 1966 electoral redistribution saw this riding gain territory from Metchosin and lose territory in the northern end toward the Englishman River. This riding was dissolved into Cowichan—Malahat—The Islands and Nanaimo—Alberni in 1979.

== Members of Parliament ==
Parliament	Years	Member	Party
Riding created from Nanaimo
25th	1962–1963	Colin Cameron	New Democratic
26th	1963–1965	Colin Cameron	New Democratic
27th	1965–1968	Colin Cameron	New Democratic
28th	1968–1968†	Colin Cameron	New Democratic
28th	1969–1972	Tommy Douglas	New Democratic
29th	1972–1974	Tommy Douglas	New Democratic
30th	1974–1979	Tommy Douglas	New Democratic
Riding dissolved into Cowichan—Malahat—The Islands and Nanaimo—Alberni

== Election results ==
1974 Canadian federal election
Party	Candidate	Votes	%	±%
New Democratic	Tommy Douglas	20,444	40.92	–16.01
Progressive Conservative	Don L. Taylor	18,207	36.44	+13.70
Liberal	Raymond Patrick Kane	11,028	22.07	+6.19
Communist	Ernest Leon Knott	288	0.58	–
Total valid votes		49,967	99.68	
Total rejected ballots		158	0.32	–0.98
Turnout		50,125	73.36	–0.92
Eligible voters		68,325		
New Democratic hold		Swing		–14.86
Source: Library of Parliament

1972 Canadian federal election
Party	Candidate	Votes	%	±%
New Democratic	Tommy Douglas	25,483	56.93	–0.10
Progressive Conservative	George MacPherson	10,179	22.74	+17.06
Liberal	Bill Matthews	7,107	15.88	–21.40
Social Credit	Stockwell Day, Sr.	1,868	4.17	–
Independent	Ken Hasanen	125	0.28	–
Total valid votes		44,762	98.70	
Total rejected ballots		588	1.30	
Turnout		45,350	74.28	
Eligible voters		61,054		
New Democratic hold		Swing		–8.58
Source: Library of Parliament

Canadian federal by-election, 10 February 1969 On the death of Colin Cameron, 28 July 1968
Party	Candidate	Votes	%	±%
New Democratic	Tommy Douglas	19,730	57.03	+15.32
Liberal	Eric W. Winch	12,897	37.28	+6.21
Progressive Conservative	Magdalenus Verbrugge	1,966	5.68	–18.28
Total valid votes		34,593	100.00	
Total rejected ballots		–		
Turnout		34,593	–	
Eligible voters		–		
New Democratic hold		Swing		+4.56
Source: Library of Parliament

1968 Canadian federal election
Party	Candidate	Votes	%	±%
New Democratic	Colin Cameron	15,273	41.71	–3.74
Liberal	Mladen Giunio Zorkin	11,378	31.07	+7.38
Progressive Conservative	Jeffry Brock	8,773	23.96	+6.34
Social Credit	Lorne Lee	1,193	3.26	–9.98
Total valid votes		36,617	99.26	
Total rejected ballots		274	0.74	–0.08
Turnout		36,891	77.79	+2.49
Eligible voters		47,424		
New Democratic hold		Swing		–5.56
Source: Library of Parliament

1965 Canadian federal election
Party	Candidate	Votes	%	±%
New Democratic	Colin Cameron	12,337	45.45	+1.30
Liberal	Douglas Malcolm Greer	6,431	23.69	–0.69
Progressive Conservative	Walter Matthews	4,784	17.62	–5.68
Social Credit	Lyle C. Wilkinson	3,595	13.24	+5.07
Total valid votes		27,147	99.18	
Total rejected ballots		224	0.82	+0.27
Turnout		27,371	75.30	–5.73
Eligible voters		36,349		
New Democratic hold		Swing		+1.00
Source: Library of Parliament

1963 Canadian federal election
Party	Candidate	Votes	%	±%
New Democratic	Colin Cameron	12,280	44.15	+1.80
Liberal	Douglas Malcolm Greer	6,782	24.38	+3.70
Progressive Conservative	Walter Matthews	6,481	23.30	–4.34
Social Credit	Alfred Douglas Dane	2,272	8.17	–1.16
Total valid votes		27,815	99.45	
Total rejected ballots		154	0.55	–0.14
Turnout		27,969	81.03	+0.70
Eligible voters		34,517		
New Democratic hold		Swing		–0.95
Source: Library of Parliament

1962 Canadian federal election
Party	Candidate	Votes	%	±%
New Democratic	Colin Cameron	11,152	42.35	–
Progressive Conservative	Walter Matthews	7,280	27.64	–
Liberal	John F.T. Saywell	5,446	20.68	–
Social Credit	Cyril Norman Dawkin	2,456	9.33	–
Total valid votes		26,334	99.31	
Total rejected ballots		182	0.69	–
Turnout		26,516	80.33	–
Eligible voters		33,010		
New Democratic notional gain from Progressive Conservative		Swing		–
This riding was created from Nanaimo, with Walter Matthews being the incumbent.
Source: Library of Parliament

== See also ==
- List of Canadian electoral districts
- Historical federal electoral districts of Canada
