= Canadian Corps (World War II) =

- Active: 1940–42
- Country: Canada
- Branch: Canadian Army
- Type: Corps
- Role: To help defend England against the threat of German invasion from occupied France.
- Size: Two infantry divisions
- Engagements: World War II

Commanders
- Notable commanders: Andrew McNaughton; George Pearkes; Harry Crerar

The unnumbered Canadian Corps was the first corps-level military formation established by the Canadian Army during the Second World War between late 1940 and mid-1942. A four-division Canadian Corps had existed during the First World War. However, during World War II Canada's military contribution was to increase to the scale of a five-division, two-corps army and the formation was eventually redesignated as I Canadian Corps on April 6, 1942.

== Formation and history ==
The Canadian Corps became effective in the United Kingdom on December 24, 1940. It was formed by renaming the existing Anglo-Canadian VII Corps. The 1st Canadian Infantry Division had already been sent across the Atlantic between December 1939 and early 1940, and had been attached to VII Corps to help defend southern England against the threat of German invasion from occupied France. However, the number of Canadian troops in the United Kingdom had increased significantly with the staged arrival, over the second half of 1940, of the 2nd Canadian Infantry Division. As a result, the formation of a separate Canadian Corps was deemed advisable to accommodate and clearly highlight the growing military contribution from Canada. It was based at Headley Court in Surrey.

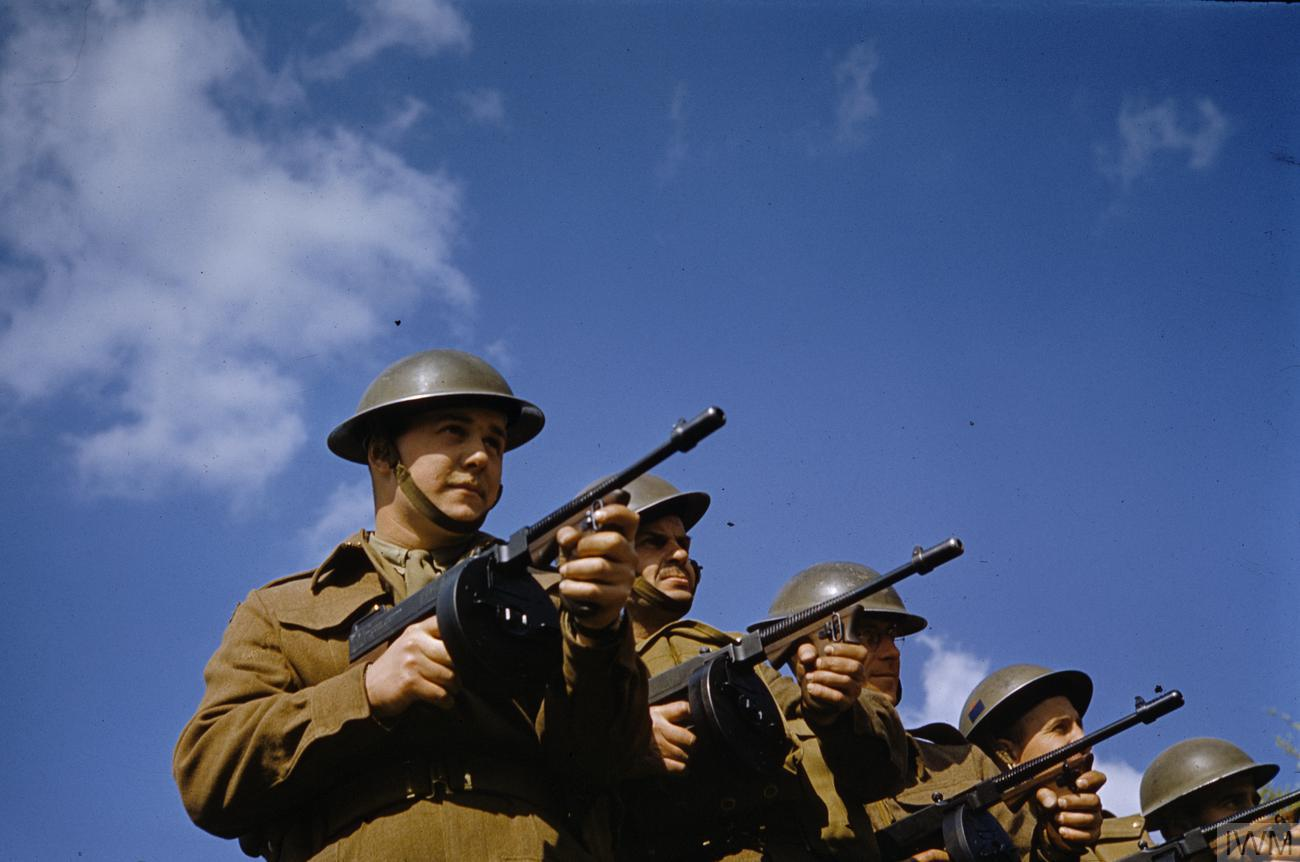
Canadian troops in England, 1942

British staff officers in the new Canadian Corps were replaced gradually with Canadians as trained replacements became available. Similarly, British units in the corps were gradually replaced with Canadian units. The Canadian Corps was redesignated I Canadian Corps on April 6, 1942, when the growing size of Canada's overseas expeditionary force in the United Kingdom required the formation of the First Canadian Army.

== Commanding officers ==
The Canadian Corps was commanded initially by Lieutenant-General Andrew McNaughton (December 1940 to December 1941), who had previously commanded VII Corps. From November–December 1941 Major General George Pearkes was asked to assume command of the Canadian Corps, taking the place of Andrew McNaughton who was on an extended leave. Lieutenant-General Harry Crerar assumed command from December 23, 1941, to April 6, 1942.
