= Walter Matthews (politician) =

Canadian politician (1900–1986)

Walter Franklyn Matthews

Member of Parliament for Nanaimo
- In office March 1958 – June 1962
- Preceded by: Colin Cameron
- Succeeded by: Colin Cameron

Personal details
- Born: 21 March 1900 Reston, Manitoba, Canada
- Died: 16 September 1986 (aged 86) Nanaimo, British Columbia, Canada
- Party: Progressive Conservative
- Spouse: Margaret Glover (m. 2 June 1928)
- Profession: Merchant

Walter Franklyn Matthews (21 March 1900 – 16 September 1986) was a Progressive Conservative party member of the House of Commons of Canada. Born in Reston, Manitoba, he was a merchant by career.

He was first elected at the Nanaimo riding in the 1958 general election, after an unsuccessful attempt there in the 1957 election. He served one term, the 24th Canadian Parliament, before the riding was renamed Nanaimo—Cowichan—The Islands. Matthews was defeated in the 1962 election by Colin Cameron and again in 1963 and 1965 Canadian federal election.
