= Daniel Campbell (Canadian politician) =

Canadian politician (1926–1992)

Dan Campbell

Member of the British Columbia Legislative Assembly for Comox
- In office September 19, 1956 – July 24, 1972
- Preceded by: William Campbell Moore
- Succeeded by: Karen Sanford

Minister of Municipal Affairs of British Columbia
- In office March 20, 1964 – September 15, 1972
- Premier: W. A. C. Bennett
- Preceded by: Wesley Drewett Black
- Succeeded by: Jim Lorimer

Minister of Social Welfare of British Columbia
- In office December 12, 1966 – October 27, 1969
- Premier: W. A. C. Bennett
- Preceded by: Wesley Drewett Black
- Succeeded by: Phil Gaglardi

Personal details
- Born: January 22, 1926 Holytown, Lanarkshire, Scotland
- Died: April 5, 1992 (aged 66) Campbell River, British Columbia, Canada
- Party: Social Credit
- Spouse: Kathleen Jean (Jeanie) Jensen (m. 1952)
- Children: Patrick Michael (Mike), Mark William, Susan Joan, Shannon Jean
- Education: University of British Columbia
- Occupation: teacher

Daniel Robert John Campbell (January 22, 1926 – April 5, 1992) was a Canadian politician who represented the constituency of Comox in the Legislative Assembly of British Columbia from 1956 to 1972. Part of the British Columbia Social Credit Party (Socred) caucus, he served in the provincial cabinet under Premier W. A. C. Bennett as Minister of Municipal Affairs and Minister of Social Welfare.

== Biography ==
Born in Scotland, Campbell graduated from the University of British Columbia in 1952 with a bachelor of arts degree, then married Kathleen Jensen the same year; they had four children together. Prior to entering politics, he worked as a teacher and served as department head of extra-curricular activities at a Courtenay school.

He ran in the 1956 provincial election as a British Columbia Social Credit Party candidate, and was elected member of the legislative assembly for Comox. He was re-elected there in 1960, 1963, 1966 and 1969. He joined Premier W. A. C. Bennett's cabinet in March 1964 as Minister of Municipal Affairs, and introduced British Columbia's current system of regional districts in 1965. He additionally served as Minister of Social Welfare from December 1966 to October 1969.

The Socreds lost to the New Democratic Party (NDP) in the 1972 election, and Campbell himself was defeated in the Comox riding by NDP candidate Karen Sanford. He was approached by Bennett, now Leader of the Opposition, to serve as his administrative assistant, and stayed on as aide after Bennett's son Bill took over as party leader. He worked as the Socreds' campaign manager during the 1975 election, which saw the party return to power, and again in 1979. He then served as the younger Bennett's intergovernmental relations director, but resigned in December 1979 over controversy regarding the party's campaign expenditures.

After suffering two strokes in 1991, he died in 1992 at age 66.
