= George Chatterton (politician) =

Canadian politician

George Louis Chatterton
- Official 1966 portrait

Member of Parliament for Esquimalt—Saanich
- In office 29 May 1961 – 24 June 1968
- Preceded by: George Pearkes
- Succeeded by: David Anderson

Personal details
- Born: 16 January 1916 South Africa
- Died: 9 July 1983 (aged 67)
- Party: Progressive Conservative
- Spouse: Kitty Cavanagh (m. 1944)
- Children: 4
- Education: University of Pretoria; Cornell University
- Profession: Agrologist

George Louis Chatterton (16 January 1916 – 9 July 1983) was a Progressive Conservative party member of the House of Commons of Canada. He was an agrologist by career.

He was first elected at the Esquimalt—Saanich riding in a 29 May 1961 by-election, then elected for a full term in Parliament there in the 1962 federal election. After two further re-elections in 1963 and 1965, Chatterton was defeated by David Anderson of the Liberal party in the 1968 election.
