= Colin Cameron (Canadian politician) =

Canadian politician (1896–1968)

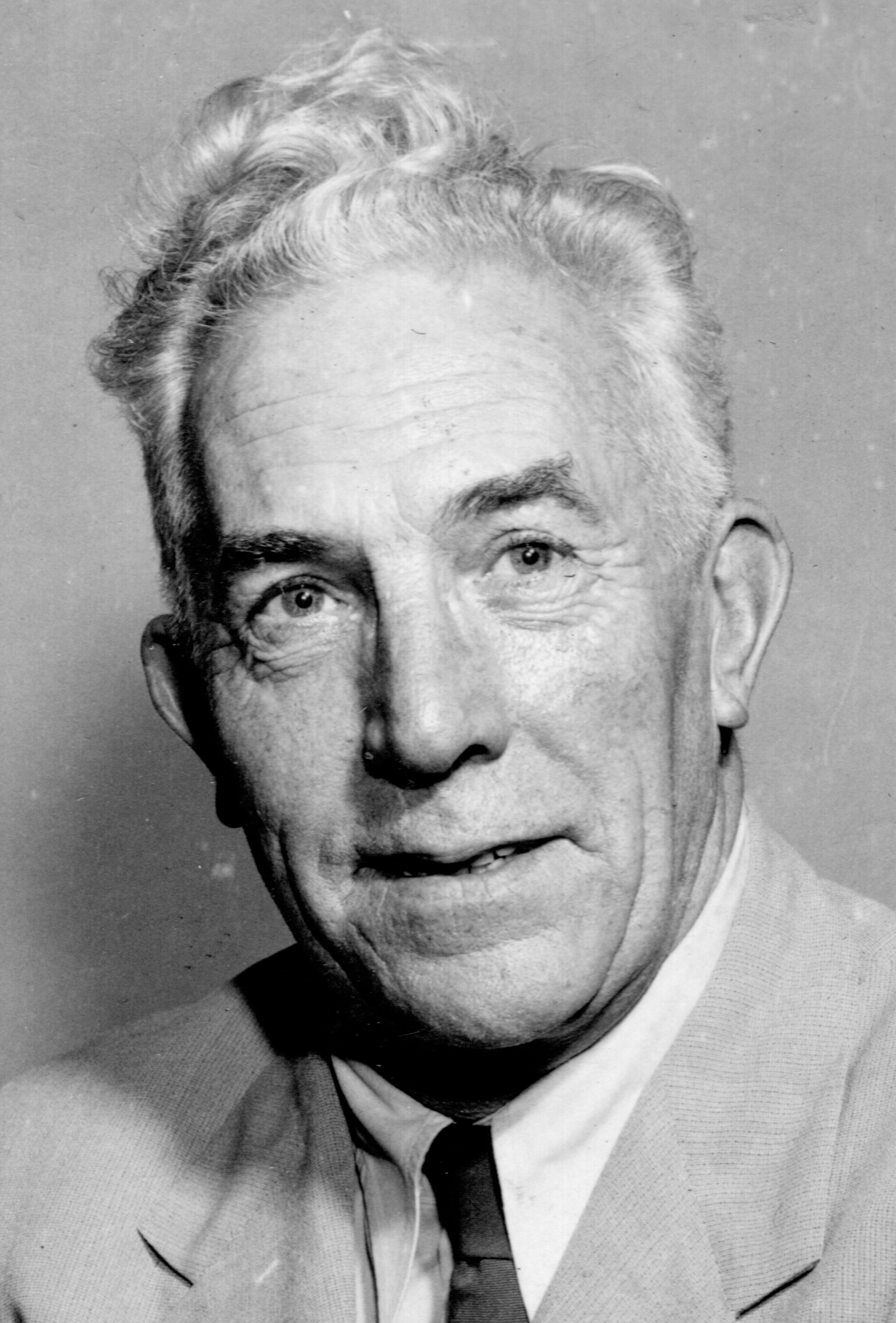

MLA for Comox
- In office 1937–1945
- Preceded by: Laurence Hanna
- Succeeded by: William Moore

MP for Nanaimo
- In office November 12, 1953 – February 1, 1958
- Preceded by: George Pearkes
- Succeeded by: Walter Matthews

MP for Nanaimo—Cowichan—The Islands
- In office September 27, 1962 – July 28, 1968
- Preceded by: first member
- Succeeded by: Tommy Douglas

Personal details
- Born: September 28, 1896 Exeter, England
- Died: July 28, 1968 (aged 71)
- Party: CCF / NDP
- Occupation: economist, farmer

Colin Cameron (September 28, 1896 – July 28, 1968) was a Canadian politician who represented the electoral districts of Nanaimo from 1953 to 1958 and Nanaimo—Cowichan—The Islands from 1962 to 1968 in the House of Commons of Canada. He was a member of the Cooperative Commonwealth Federation in his first term of office, and of its successor, the New Democratic Party, in his second term.

Born in England, Cameron came to Canada in 1907 at the age of ten. He worked as a farmer and in a shipyard before entering politics.

He also represented the district of Comox in the Legislative Assembly of British Columbia from 1937 to 1945. Provincially, he was defeated when he sought reelection in the 1945 provincial election in Comox, a 1948 provincial byelection in Saanich, the 1949 provincial election in Comox, the 1952 and 1953 provincial elections in Victoria City, and the 1960 provincial election in Nanaimo and the Islands. During World War I, Cameron served overseas as an engineer with the 1st Canadian Pioneer Battalion in France and Belgium.

He served as the NDP's financial critic. Cameron died suddenly in office from a stroke at the age of 71.

He was the author of Forestry ... B.C.'s devastated industry (ca 1940) and Money and the war (ca 1943).
