= James Manly =

Canadian politician (born 1932)

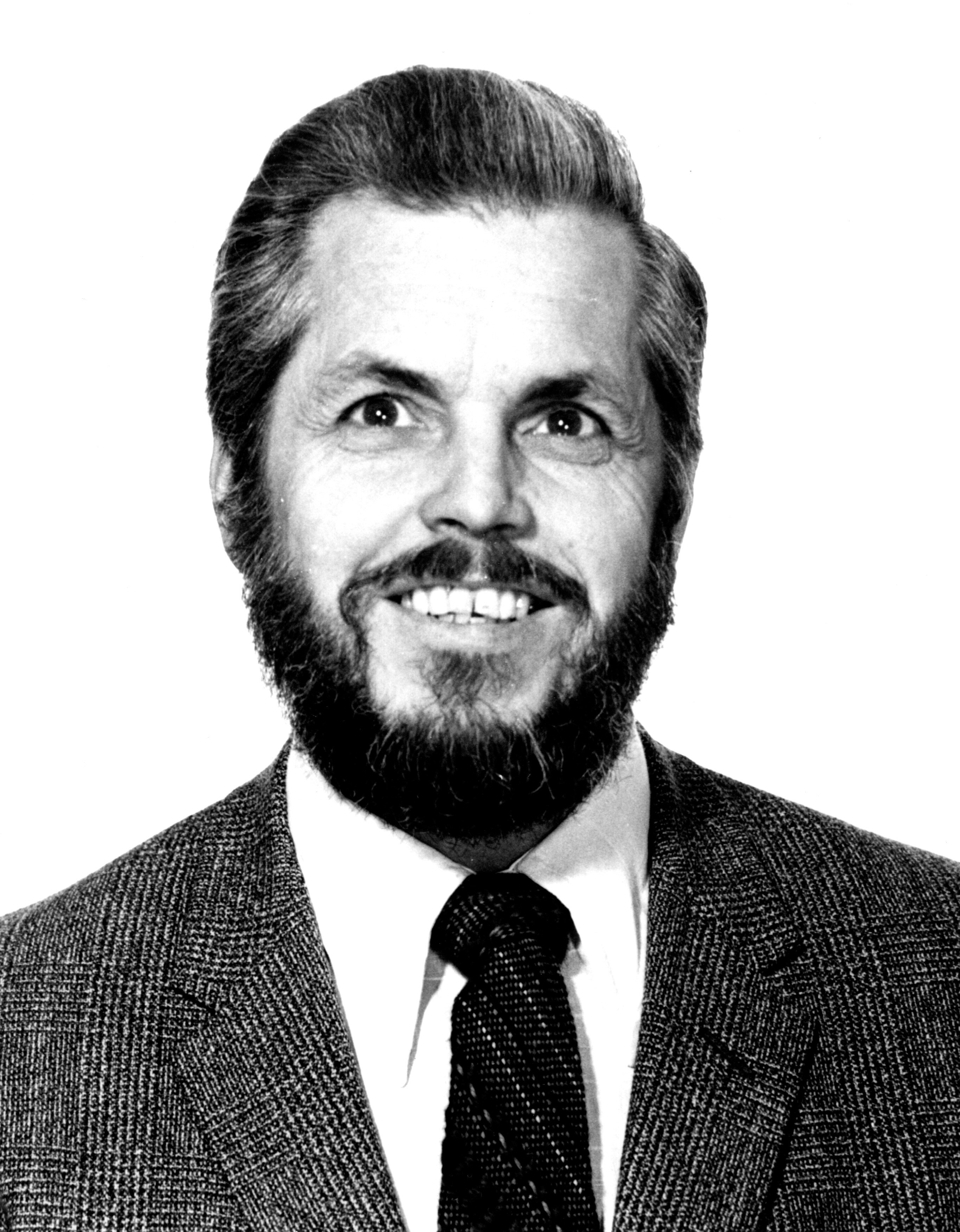

Member of Parliament for Cowichan—Malahat—The Islands
- In office 18 February 1980 – 21 November 1988
- Preceded by: Don L. Taylor
- Succeeded by: Riding dissolved

Personal details
- Born: 29 October 1932 (age 93) Saskatoon, Saskatchewan, Canada
- Party: New Democratic Party
- Spouse: Eva Manly
- Children: Paul Manly
- Occupation: Clergyman, factory worker, logger, politician

James Douglas Manly (born 29 October 1932) is a former Canadian politician who served as the Member of Parliament (MP) for Cowichan—Malahat—The Islands from 1980 to 1988. A member of the New Democratic Party, he also was a clergyman, factory worker and logger by career.

== Before politics ==
Manly was ordained a minister in the United Church of Canada in 1957.

== Political career ==
His first attempt at entering federal politics was unsuccessful as he was defeated at British Columbia's Cowichan—Malahat—The Islands electoral district in the 1979 federal election. He won the riding in the 1980 federal election and was re-elected in the 1984 election. After this he left national politics having served in the 32nd and 33rd Canadian Parliaments. In parliament, Manly served as the New Democratic Party's Aboriginal Affairs critic. He and his wife had previously lived and worked with Haisla people in Kitimat from 1959 to 1963. As an MP he refused to support the Meech Lake Accord despite his party's official support for the constitutional deal, and walked out of the House of Commons during one of the votes on the accord.

Manly also unsuccessfully attempted to enter British Columbia politics for the NDP in 1969 at the provincial Prince Rupert riding.

== After politics ==
He has remained active in peace and social justice issues and has engaged in Central American solidarity work on behalf of the United Church. In 1997, he wrote The Wounds of Manuel Saquic : Biblical Reflections from Guatemala. Published by the United Church's publishing arm, the book explored the issues of poverty, justice, solidarity and liberation theology in Guatemala and Central America linking issues with biblical passages. He also served as a member of the United Church's British Columbia task force on residential schools and recommended that the church apologize to aboriginal Canadians for its role in the institutions.

Manly supported Svend Robinson's unsuccessful bid to win the NDP's federal leadership convention in 1995 and Jack Layton's successful candidacy in 2003.

On 20 October 2012, Manly was arrested by Israel for trying to breach the blockade of the Gaza Strip on the ship Estelle as part of the Swedish-led Ship to Gaza initiative along with multiple European parliamentarians. At the time, he required regular medicine after recovering from two bypass surgeries and was seen by an Israeli doctor. He was released on 25 October, saying that he suffered only minor indignities. The Canadian Boat to Gaza organization that facilitated Manly's participation in the humanitarian mission blamed the delay between his release and the release of Spanish and Greek participants 21 October on a lack of pressure from Conservative prime minister Stephen Harper's government.

His son, Paul Manly, initially sought the NDP nomination for Nanaimo—Ladysmith in the 2015 election but was rejected by the party's federal executive for publicly criticizing the NDP because the party did not advocate on behalf of his father Jim when the former MP was detained for four days by the Israeli military in 2012. Paul was elected as a Green Party of Canada MP in the 2019 Nanaimo—Ladysmith by-election.
