= Hugh Stewart (Canadian politician) =

Member of the Legislative Assembly of British Columbia
- In office 1916–1920
- Preceded by: Michael Manson
- Succeeded by: Thomas Menzies
- Constituency: Comox

Personal details
- Born: May 15, 1861 New Brunswick
- Died: February 12, 1933 (aged 71) Victoria, British Columbia
- Party: British Columbia Liberal Party
- Spouse: R.E. Boak
- Occupation: farmer

Hugh Stewart (May 15, 1861 – February 12, 1933) was a Canadian politician. He served in the Legislative Assembly of British Columbia from 1916 to 1920 from the electoral district of Comox, a member of the Liberal party.
