= Karen Sanford =

Canadian politician

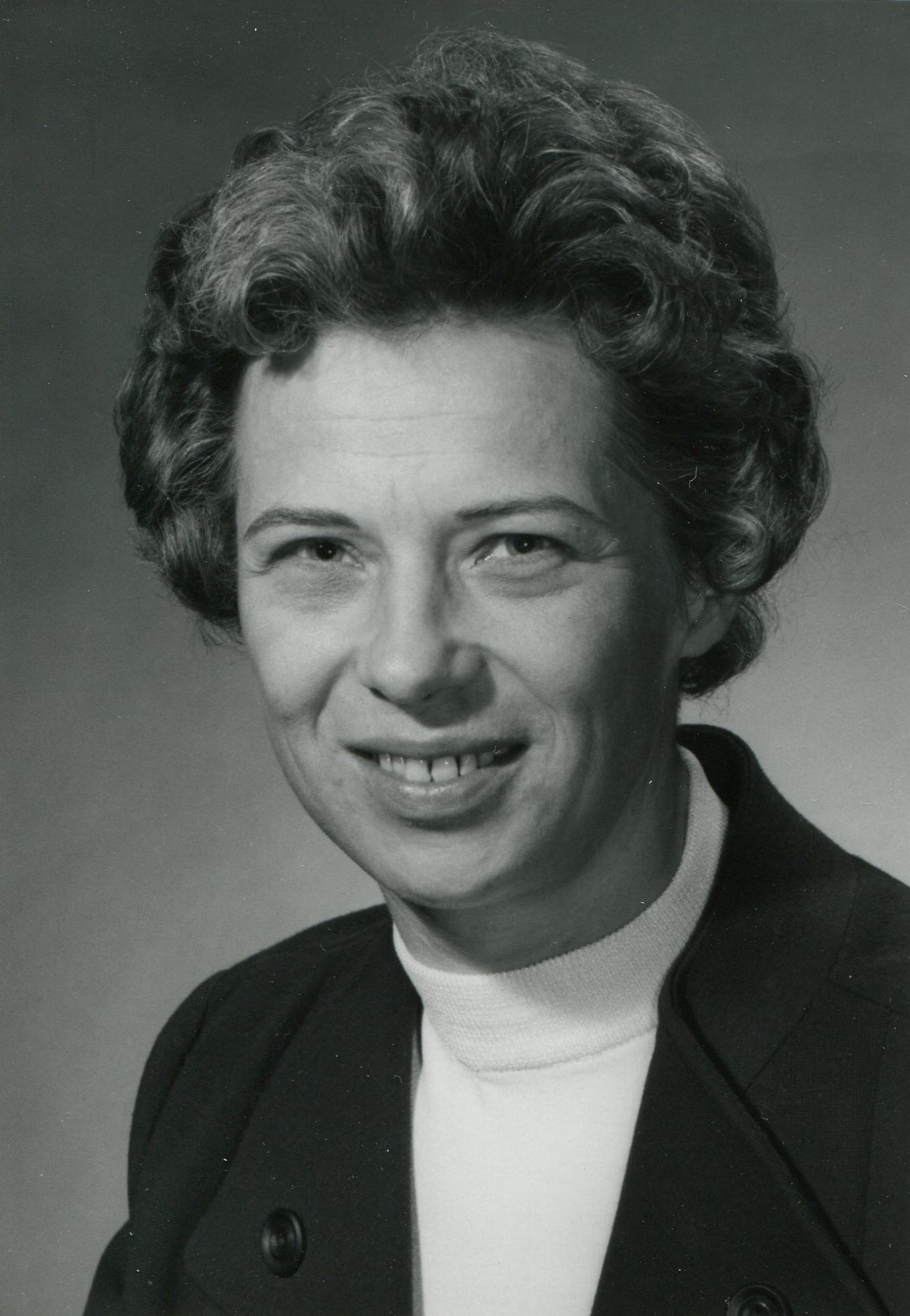

MLA for Comox
- In office 1972–1986
- Preceded by: Daniel Campbell
- Succeeded by: Stan Hagen

Personal details
- Born: May 31, 1932 Wayne, Alberta
- Died: November 15, 2010 (aged 78) Courtenay, British Columbia
- Party: British Columbia New Democratic Party

Karen Elizabeth Sanford (May 31, 1932 – November 15, 2010) was a Canadian politician. She served as MLA for the Comox riding in the Legislative Assembly of British Columbia from 1972 until her defeat by Stan Hagen in the 1986 election, as a member of the British Columbia New Democratic Party. She died of cancer in 2010.
