= Dola Dunsmuir =

Canadian socialite

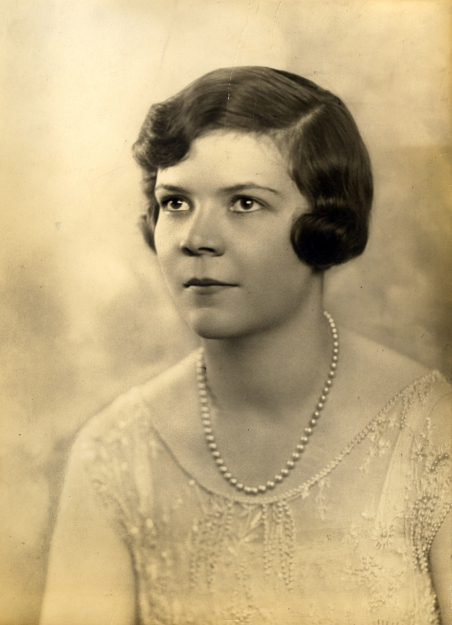
- Born: September 25, 1903; Victoria, British Columbia, Canada
- Died: December 9, 1966 (aged 63); Victoria, British Columbia, Canada
- Spouse: Henry J. F. Cavendish (m. 1928; div. 1934)
- Father: James Dunsmuir

Dola Frances Dunsmuir Cavendish (September 25, 1903 – December 9, 1966) was a Canadian socialite, rumored to have been Tallulah Bankhead's long lasting companion.

== Biography ==
Dola Frances Dunsmuir was born on September 25, 1903, the youngest daughter of James Dunsmuir, British Columbian industrialist and politician, and Laura Miller Surles. She grew up at Hatley Castle.

While in London on a long vacation, Dunsmuir met Tallulah Bankhead, with whom she formed a long lasting friendship.

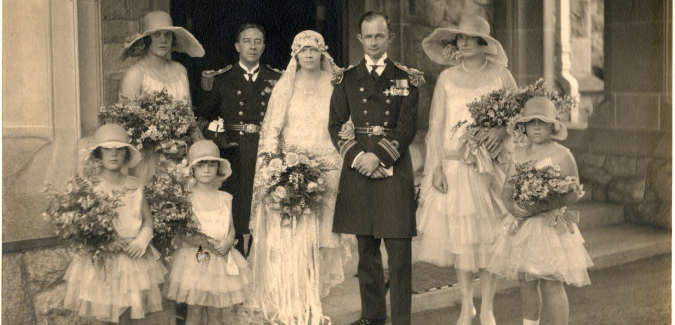
Dola Dunsmuir wedding

On August 11, 1928, she married Lieutenant-Commander Henry James Francis Cavendish (1893-1956). They divorced in 1934.

Dunsmuir returned to Victoria, British Columbia, at the outbreak of World War II in 1939. She built a house between Hatley and Fort Rodd Hill Park, "Dolaura", where she lived while she was not following Bankhead on tour. When her sister Kathleen was killed in the Blitz in London in 1941, Dunsmuir moved permanently to Dolaura to take care of her sister's youngest teenage daughters.

Bankhead continued to visit often, and they held notorious parties until 1966, when Dola Dunsmuir Cavendish died of cirrhosis of the liver.
