= William Munro Dingwall =

Canadian politician

William Munro Dingwall (March 2, 1851 – April 3, 1889) was a Scottish-born general merchant and political figure in British Columbia. He represented Comox in the Legislative Assembly of British Columbia from 1882 to 1886.

He was born near Dingwall and was educated there. Dingwall came to London, Ontario in 1872 and then settled in British Columbia four years later. He married Barbara Duncan. Dingwall was postmaster for Comox. He also served as government agent, assessor and tax collector. Dingwall was defeated when he ran for reelection in the 1886 provincial election and again in an 1887 provincial byelection. He died in Comox at the age of 38.
