= Ralph Smith (Canadian politician) =

Canadian politician

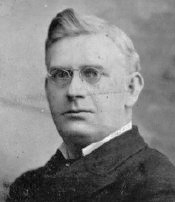

Member of the Canadian Parliament for Vancouver
- In office 1900–1904
- Preceded by: William Wallace Burns McInnes
- Succeeded by: District was abolished in 1903

Member of the Canadian Parliament for Nanaimo
- In office 1904–1911
- Preceded by: District was created in 1903
- Succeeded by: Francis Henry Shepherd

Member of the Legislative Assembly of British Columbia for Nanaimo
- In office 1898–1900
- In office 1916–1917

Personal details
- Born: August 8, 1858 Newcastle upon Tyne, England
- Died: February 17, 1917 (aged 58) Victoria, British Columbia, Canada
- Party: Liberal
- Spouse: Mary Ellen Spear (m. 1883)

Ralph Smith (August 8, 1858 – February 17, 1917) was a Canadian coal miner, labour leader, and politician.

Born in Newcastle upon Tyne, England, he emigrated to Canada with his wife in 1891 settling in Nanaimo, British Columbia. A miner by trade, Smith was a moderate trade unionist in Nanaimo. After being defeated in the 1894 provincial election, in 1898, he won election to the Legislative Assembly of British Columbia on a moderate "Liberal-Labour" platform. He ran for Vancouver Island's seat in the House of Commons of Canada in the 1900 federal election. Reports vary on whether he ran as an Independent Labour-Liberal candidate defeating the official Liberal and Conservative candidates, but once elected, he joined the Liberal caucus. He was re-elected in the 1904 and 1908 elections as a Liberal. He was defeated in the 1911 election and in the 1912 BC provincial election. Smith subsequently returned to provincial politics and, returned to the provincial legislature in the 1916 provincial election that brought the British Columbia Liberal Party to power.

Smith served as Minister of Finance in the government of Premier Harlan Carey Brewster, and died in office on February 17, 1917. His wife, Mary Ellen Smith, succeeded him in the subsequent by-election (held January 1918) as an Independent Liberal Member of the Legislative Assembly (MLA). She subsequently became the first female cabinet minister in the British Empire.

Ralph Smith was a supporter of women's suffrage, which was enacted in the province shortly after the Liberals came to power after ten previous attempts over the years had failed.
