= Esquimalt—Saanich =

Former federal electoral district in British Columbia, Canada

British Columbia electoral district

Defunct federal electoral district
- Legislature: House of Commons
- District created: 1952
- District abolished: 1987
- First contested: 1953
- Last contested: 1984

Esquimalt—Saanich was a federal electoral district in British Columbia, Canada, that was represented in the House of Commons of Canada from 1953 to 1988. This riding was created in 1952 from parts of Nanaimo riding.

It was abolished in 1987 when it was redistributed into Esquimalt—Juan de Fuca and Saanich—Gulf Islands ridings. It consisted of the southern part of Vancouver Island and off-shore islands.

== Members of Parliament ==
Parliament	Years	Member	Party
Riding created from Nanaimo
22nd	1953–1957	George Pearkes	Progressive Conservative
23rd	1957–1958	George Pearkes	Progressive Conservative
24th	1958–1960	George Pearkes	Progressive Conservative
24th	1961–1962	George Chatterton	Progressive Conservative
25th	1962–1963	George Chatterton	Progressive Conservative
26th	1963–1965	George Chatterton	Progressive Conservative
27th	1965–1968	George Chatterton	Progressive Conservative
28th	1968–1972	David Anderson	Liberal
29th	1972–1974	Donald W. Munro	Progressive Conservative
30th	1974–1979	Donald W. Munro	Progressive Conservative
31st	1979–1980	Donald W. Munro	Progressive Conservative
32nd	1980–1984	Donald W. Munro	Progressive Conservative
33rd	1984–1988	Patrick Crofton	Progressive Conservative
Riding dissolved into Esquimalt—Juan de Fuca and Saanich—Gulf Islands

== Election results ==
=== 1984 ===
1984 Canadian federal election
Party	Candidate	Votes	%	±%
Progressive Conservative	Patrick Crofton	31,766	48.28	+3.26
New Democratic	Bob Cameron	23,094	35.10	+0.63
Liberal	Gerry Kristianson	9,516	14.46	–3.65
Green	Peter Montgomery	547	0.83	–
Social Credit	Robert C. Baker	306	0.47	–
Confederation of Regions	Pat Paterson	304	0.46	–
Libertarian	Kjell Nilsen	163	0.25	–
Communist	Ernest Leon Knott	94	0.14	–
Total valid votes		65,790	99.75	
Total rejected ballots		162	0.25	+0.06
Turnout		65,952	79.92	+5.94
Eligible voters		82,525		
Progressive Conservative hold		Swing		+1.32
Source: Elections Canada

=== 1980 ===
1980 Canadian federal election
Party	Candidate	Votes	%	±%
Progressive Conservative	Donald W. Munro	24,961	45.02	–9.50
New Democratic	Bob Cameron	19,115	34.48	+5.45
Liberal	Gerry Kristianson	10,043	18.11	+3.19
Independent	Philip Gordon Ney	776	1.40	–0.13
Rhinoceros	Bob Maddocks	548	0.99	–
Total valid votes		55,443	99.81	
Total rejected ballots		105	0.19	–0.04
Turnout		55,548	73.98	–3.58
Eligible voters		75,084		
Progressive Conservative hold		Swing		–7.48
Source: Elections Canada

=== 1979 ===
1979 Canadian federal election
Party	Candidate	Votes	%	±%
Progressive Conservative	Donald W. Munro	29,791	54.52	+4.51
New Democratic	Bob Cameron	15,862	29.03	+10.63
Liberal	Alan Peterson	8,154	14.92	–14.83
Independent	Philip Gordon Ney	836	1.53	–
Total valid votes		54,643	99.77	
Total rejected ballots		128	0.23	–0.07
Turnout		54,771	77.56	+3.75
Eligible voters		70,614		
Progressive Conservative hold		Swing		+9.67
Source: Elections Canada

=== 1974 ===
1974 Canadian federal election
Party	Candidate	Votes	%	±%
Progressive Conservative	Donald W. Munro	27,571	50.01	+9.05
Liberal	Don Joy	16,404	29.76	+5.63
New Democratic	Peter Smart	10,141	18.39	–13.16
Social Credit	Gerald W. Clarke	841	1.53	–1.84
Communist	Barry Dean	173	0.31	–
Total valid votes		55,130	99.69	
Total rejected ballots		169	0.31	–0.06
Turnout		55,299	73.81	–0.73
Eligible voters		74,919		
Progressive Conservative hold		Swing		+1.70
Source: Library of Parliament

=== 1972 ===
1972 Canadian federal election
Party	Candidate	Votes	%	±%
Progressive Conservative	Donald W. Munro	20,542	40.96	+8.45
New Democratic	Roger Smith	15,824	31.55	+5.35
Liberal	Louis F. Lindholm	12,097	24.12	–15.36
Social Credit	John Douglas Tisdalle	1,689	3.37	+1.57
Total valid votes		50,152	99.64	
Total rejected ballots		183	0.36	–0.13
Turnout		50,335	74.54	–5.33
Eligible voters		67,528		
Progressive Conservative gain from Liberal		Swing		+11.91
Source: Library of Parliament

=== 1968 ===
1968 Canadian federal election
Party	Candidate	Votes	%	±%
Liberal	David Anderson	16,501	39.48	+15.77
Progressive Conservative	George Chatterton	13,587	32.51	–6.08
New Democratic	Donald Johannessen	10,952	26.21	+2.26
Social Credit	Ralph Leroy Overton	751	1.80	–11.95
Total valid votes		41,791	99.50	
Total rejected ballots		209	0.50	–0.01
Turnout		42,000	79.87	–0.02
Eligible voters		52,587		
Liberal gain from Progressive Conservative		Swing		+10.92
Source: Library of Parliament

=== 1965 ===
1965 Canadian federal election
Party	Candidate	Votes	%	±%
Progressive Conservative	George Chatterton	14,787	38.59	+1.14
New Democratic	Len Stephenson	9,177	23.95	+4.39
Liberal	Jim Gorst	9,086	23.71	–6.71
Social Credit	Vera I. Pipes	5,268	13.75	+1.18
Total valid votes		38,318	99.49	
Total rejected ballots		196	0.51	–0.02
Turnout		38,514	79.89	–3.16
Eligible voters		48,209		
Progressive Conservative hold		Swing		–1.62
Source: Library of Parliament

=== 1963 ===
1963 Canadian federal election
Party	Candidate	Votes	%	±%
Progressive Conservative	George Chatterton	13,772	37.45	–0.52
Liberal	Robert V. Ostler	11,187	30.42	–1.39
New Democratic	John Windsor	7,193	19.56	+0.94
Social Credit	Edward Lum	4,621	12.57	+0.97
Total valid votes		36,773	99.47	
Total rejected ballots		195	0.53	–0.11
Turnout		36,968	83.05	+5.32
Eligible voters		44,514		
Progressive Conservative hold		Swing		+0.44
Source: Library of Parliament

=== 1962 ===
1962 Canadian federal election
Party	Candidate	Votes	%	±%
Progressive Conservative	George Chatterton	12,612	37.97	+7.02
Liberal	David Groos	10,566	31.81	+2.83
New Democratic	Geoff Mitchell	6,186	18.62	–4.82
Social Credit	R.J. Pring	3,852	11.60	–4.56
Total valid votes		33,216	99.36	
Total rejected ballots		213	0.64	–
Turnout		33,429	77.73	–
Eligible voters		43,008		
Progressive Conservative hold		Swing		+2.10
Source: Library of Parliament

=== 1961 ===
Canadian federal by-election, 29 May 1961 On George Pearkes being appointed Lieutenant-Governor of British Columbia, 11 October 1960
Party	Candidate	Votes	%	±%
Progressive Conservative	George Chatterton	8,554	30.95	–34.65
Liberal	David Groos	8,010	28.98	+16.48
New Democratic	Glen Francis Hamilton	6,481	23.45	+6.83
Social Credit	George Hahn	4,466	16.16	+11.50
Socialist	Don Poirier	131	0.47	–
Total valid votes		27,642	100.00	
Total rejected ballots		unknown		
Turnout		27,642	–	–
Eligible voters				
Progressive Conservative hold		Swing		–25.56
Source: Library of Parliament

=== 1958 ===
1958 Canadian federal election
Party	Candidate	Votes	%	±%
Progressive Conservative	George Pearkes	18,768	65.60	+11.79
Co-operative Commonwealth	John Morris Thomas	4,755	16.62	+1.01
Liberal	George Preston	3,576	12.50	–5.17
Social Credit	Noel E.J. Bell	1,331	4.65	–8.26
Labor–Progressive	Ernest Leon Knott	180	0.63	–
Total valid votes		28,610	99.21	
Total rejected ballots		227	0.79	+0.17
Turnout		28,837	77.16	–2.60
Eligible voters		37,371		
Progressive Conservative hold		Swing		+5.39
Source: Library of Parliament

=== 1957 ===
1957 Canadian federal election
Party	Candidate	Votes	%	±%
Progressive Conservative	George Pearkes	15,330	53.81	+7.67
Liberal	Alistair Fraser	5,034	17.67	–2.02
Co-operative Commonwealth	John Morris Thomas	4,446	15.61	–1.25
Social Credit	Noel E.J. Bell	3,677	12.91	–4.40
Total valid votes		28,487	99.38	
Total rejected ballots		177	0.62	–0.16
Turnout		28,664	79.76	+12.36
Eligible voters		35,937		
Progressive Conservative hold		Swing		+4.85
Source: Library of Parliament

=== 1953 ===
1953 Canadian federal election
Party	Candidate	Votes	%	±%
Progressive Conservative	George Pearkes	9,537	46.14	–
Liberal	Duncan MacBride	4,071	19.70	–
Social Credit	James Roberts	3,578	17.31	–
Co-operative Commonwealth	Robert Matthew McIntosh	3,484	16.86	–
Total valid votes		20,670	99.22	
Total rejected ballots		162	0.78	–
Turnout		20,832	67.40	–
Eligible voters		30,907		
Progressive Conservative notional hold		Swing		–
This riding was created from parts of Nanaimo, with Progressive Conservative George Pearkes being the incumbent.
Source: Library of Parliament

== See also ==
- List of Canadian electoral districts
- Historical federal electoral districts of Canada
