= Don L. Taylor =

Canadian politician

Member of Parliament for Cowichan—Malahat—The Islands
- In office May 1979 – February 1980
- Preceded by: riding created
- Succeeded by: James Manly

Personal details
- Born: 21 May 1931 Edmonton, Alberta, Canada
- Died: 14 December 2022 (aged 91) White Rock, British Columbia, Canada
- Party: Progressive Conservative
- Spouse: Mavis Taylor
- Profession: Teacher

Donald L. Taylor (21 May 1931 – 14 December 2022) was a Progressive Conservative party member of the House of Commons of Canada. He was a teacher.

He was first elected to Parliament at the Cowichan—Malahat—The Islands riding in the 1979 general election after an unsuccessful campaign at Nanaimo—Cowichan—The Islands in the 1974 federal election. After completing one term, the 31st Canadian Parliament, Taylor was defeated in the 1980 election by James Manly of the New Democratic Party. Taylor was a candidate in the 1984 federal election but again lost to Manly.
