= Robert Grant (British Columbia politician) =

Canadian politician (1854–1935)

Robert Henry Grant

MLA for Comox
- In office 1903–1909

Personal details
- Born: August 22, 1854 Pictou, Nova Scotia
- Died: January 24, 1935 (aged 80) Saanich, British Columbia
- Party: British Columbia Conservative Party
- Spouse: Barbara Jane McCutcheon

Robert Grant (August 22, 1854 – January 24, 1935) was a lumberman and political figure in British Columbia. He represented Comox from 1903 to 1909 in the Legislative Assembly of British Columbia as a Conservative. He did not seek a third term in the 1909 provincial election.

He was born in Pictou, Nova Scotia, the son of Hugh Grant and Nancy Harris, and was educated there. In 1880, he married Barbara Jane McCutcheon. Grant served as mayor of Cumberland from 1902 to 1903. Grant built and operated a sawmill in Cumberland in partnership with Lewis Mounce.

He died in 1935.
