= Paul Phillips Harrison =

Member of the Legislative Assembly of British Columbia
- In office 1924–1928
- Preceded by: Thomas Menzies
- Succeeded by: George Kerr McNaughton
- Constituency: Comox

Personal details
- Born: December 1, 1882 Victoria, British Columbia
- Died: October 22, 1950 (aged 67) Nanaimo, British Columbia
- Party: Independent Liberal
- Spouse: Lillian Weir
- Occupation: judge, lawyer

Paul Phillipps Harrison (December 1, 1882 – October 22, 1950) was a Canadian politician. He served in the Legislative Assembly of British Columbia from 1924 to 1928 from the electoral district of Comox, an independent Liberal member. He did not seek a second term in the Legislature in the 1928 provincial election.
