= John Charles McIntosh =

Canadian politician

John Charles McIntosh (September 29, 1874 – February 23, 1940) was a lawyer and political figure in British Columbia. He represented Nanaimo in the House of Commons of Canada from 1917 to 1921 as a supporter of Sir Robert Borden's wartime Union Government.

He was born in Almonte, Ontario, the son of John McIntosh, and was educated in Almonte, Toronto, at the University of Toronto and Osgoode Hall. McIntosh practised law in Esquimalt, British Columbia, also serving as solicitor for the Municipality of Esquimalt from 1912 to 1940. In 1903, he married Eva Bond Thoburn. McIntosh died in Port Alberni at the age of 65.
