= Thomas Menzies =

Canadian clergyman and politician (1870–1947)

Member of the Legislative Assembly of British Columbia
- In office 1920–1924
- Preceded by: Hugh Stewart
- Succeeded by: Paul Phillips Harrison
- Constituency: Comox

Personal details
- Born: March 30, 1870 Ailsa Craig, Ontario
- Died: March 13, 1947 (aged 76) Victoria, British Columbia
- Party: People's Party
- Spouse: Abbie Grimason
- Children: 4
- Education: Manitoba College; Knox College, Toronto
- Occupation: Clergyman

Thomas Menzies (March 30, 1870 – March 13, 1947) was a Canadian Presbyterian minister and politician. He represented Comox in the Legislative Assembly of British Columbia from 1920 to 1924. He was elected under the People's Party-Farmer-Labour banner. After leaving the legislature, he became the province's superintendent of neglected children.

== Early life and ministry ==
Menzies was born in Ailsa Craig, Ontario, on March 30, 1870. He moved to British Columbia in 1895 and worked as a missionary and minister in Alberni. In 1896, he attended Manitoba College in Winnipeg before completing his studies at Knox College, Toronto. He subsequently ministered in Sandon and Revelstoke. He married Abbie Grimason and had four children.

In April 1900, Menzies and his wife arrived in Comox aboard the steam schooner Thistle. He held his first service on Easter Sunday and was inducted three days later. His pastoral work included visits to logging camps and assistance to farmers and returned soldiers.

Menzies supervised the construction of the Comox Presbyterian Church in 1902, using volunteer labour on land donated by William Robb. On Sundays, he preached in Comox in the morning, Sandwick in the afternoon and Courtenay in the evening. He also conducted services in a longhouse on the nearby First Nations reserve.

He later supervised the construction of a Presbyterian church in Courtenay, which opened on December 28, 1913. Menzies and his wife donated its bell, stipulating that the town could use it as a fire alarm. It also served as a curfew bell. He was active in local agricultural associations.

== Political career ==
Menzies was elected in the provincial election of December 1, 1920. The People's Party's only candidate, he received 1,354 votes, or 32.83 per cent of the votes cast in Comox, defeating Conservative William Edward Anderson by 121 votes. Along with Joshua Hinchliffe, elected in Victoria, he was among the first practising clergymen elected to the provincial legislature.

Menzies had advocated the exclusion of Asian immigrants during his election campaign.

In the legislature, Menzies opposed the export of unprocessed timber. Addressing a Kiwanis luncheon in January 1924, he argued that British Columbia's forests should support local manufacturing and employment rather than exploitation by American investors and led the legislative campaign against raw-material exports.

Menzies did not seek re-election in 1924. He subsequently became superintendent of neglected children under provincial secretary William Sloan.

== Death and commemoration ==
Menzies died in Victoria on March 13, 1947. A memorial plaque was unveiled by his son Wilson at St. George's United Church in Courtenay on October 31, 1954.
