= Nanaimo (electoral district) =

Former federal electoral district in British Columbia, Canada

Coordinates: 49.16262°N 123.93874°W

British Columbia electoral district

Defunct federal electoral district
- Legislature: House of Commons
- District created: 1904
- District abolished: 1962
- First contested: 1904
- Last contested: 1958

Nanaimo was a federal electoral district in British Columbia, Canada, that was represented in the House of Commons of Canada from 1904 to 1979.

This riding was created as Nanaimo riding in 1903 from parts of Vancouver and Victoria ridings.

Its legal description when it was created was: "The electoral district of Nanaimo, comprising the provincial electoral districts of Cowichan, Esquimalt, Nanaimo City, Newcastle, Saanich and The Islands."

Nanaimo electoral district was renamed Nanaimo—Cowichan—The Islands in 1962.

== Members of Parliament ==
Parliament	Years	Member	Party
Riding created from Vancouver and Victoria
10th	1904–1908	Ralph Smith	Liberal
11th	1908–1911	Ralph Smith	Liberal
12th	1911–1917	Francis Henry Shepherd	Conservative
13th	1917–1921	John Charles McIntosh	Government (Unionist)
14th	1921–1925	Charles Dickie	Conservative
15th	1925–1926	Charles Dickie	Conservative
16th	1926–1930	Charles Dickie	Conservative
17th	1930–1935	Charles Dickie	Conservative
18th	1935–1940	James Samuel Taylor	Co-operative Commonwealth
19th	1940–1945	Alan Chambers	Liberal
20th	1945–1949	George Pearkes	Progressive Conservative
21st	1949–1953	George Pearkes	Progressive Conservative
22nd	1953–1957	Colin Cameron	Co-operative Commonwealth
23rd	1957–1958	Colin Cameron	Co-operative Commonwealth
24th	1958–1962	Walter Matthews	Progressive Conservative
Riding renamed Nanaimo—Cowichan—The Islands

== Election results ==
1958 Canadian federal election
Party	Candidate	Votes	%	±%
Progressive Conservative	Walter Matthews	10,734	43.91	+17.25
Co-operative Commonwealth	Colin Cameron	10,029	41.03	+3.41
Liberal	Ernest W.H. Miller	2,606	10.66	–4.33
Social Credit	Roy Arthur Folz	1,077	4.41	–16.32
Total valid votes		24,446	99.31	
Total rejected ballots		170	0.69	+0.09
Turnout		24,616	78.94	+3.26
Eligible voters		31,184		
Progressive Conservative gain from Co-operative Commonwealth		Swing		+6.92
Source: Library of Parliament

1957 Canadian federal election
Party	Candidate	Votes	%	±%
Co-operative Commonwealth	Colin Cameron	8,650	37.62	–0.95
Progressive Conservative	Walter Matthews	6,131	26.66	+8.57
Social Credit	Harold Hine	4,766	20.73	+6.02
Liberal	Frank William Wilfert	3,448	14.99	–10.91
Total valid votes		22,995	99.40	
Total rejected ballots		138	0.60	+0.05
Turnout		23,133	75.68	+6.94
Eligible voters		30,568		
Co-operative Commonwealth hold		Swing		–4.76
Source: Library of Parliament

1953 Canadian federal election
Party	Candidate	Votes	%	±%
Co-operative Commonwealth	Colin Cameron	7,272	38.56	+11.77
Liberal	Gavin Colvin Mouat	4,884	25.90	+0.69
Progressive Conservative	Douglas Deane Finlayson	3,412	18.09	–29.90
Social Credit	Leonard Francis Hodgson	2,773	14.71	–
Labor–Progressive	Ernest Leon Knott	516	2.74	–
Total valid votes		18,857	99.46	
Total rejected ballots		103	0.54	–0.04
Turnout		18,960	68.74	–3.74
Eligible voters		27,583		
Co-operative Commonwealth gain from Progressive Conservative		Swing		+5.54
Source: Library of Parliament

1949 Canadian federal election
Party	Candidate	Votes	%	±%
Progressive Conservative	George Pearkes	17,507	48.00	+12.67
Co-operative Commonwealth	Robert Strachan	9,772	26.79	–3.35
Liberal	William Edmond Poupore	9,196	25.21	–0.77
Total valid votes		36,475	99.42	
Total rejected ballots		214	0.58	–0.23
Turnout		36,689	72.48	–9.91
Eligible voters		50,620		
Progressive Conservative hold		Swing		+8.01
Source: Library of Parliament

1945 Canadian federal election
Party	Candidate	Votes	%	±%
Progressive Conservative	George Pearkes	11,181	35.32	+5.40
Co-operative Commonwealth	John Morris Thomas	9,542	30.15	+5.26
Liberal	Alan Chambers	8,223	25.98	–16.48
Labor–Progressive	George Thomas Greenwell	2,707	8.55	–
Total valid votes		31,653	99.18	
Total rejected ballots		261	0.82	–0.70
Turnout		31,914	82.39	+3.71
Eligible voters		38,734		
Progressive Conservative gain from Liberal		Swing		+0.12
Source: Library of Parliament

1940 Canadian federal election
Party	Candidate	Votes	%	±%
Liberal	Alan Chambers	10,668	42.46	+11.81
National Government	Frank Stigant Cuncliffe	7,518	29.92	–1.89
Co-operative Commonwealth	Ronald Grantham	6,252	24.88	–9.96
New Democracy	Andrew Henry Jukes	506	2.01	–
Independent	William Frederick Povah	181	0.72	–
Total valid votes		25,125	98.48	
Total rejected ballots		388	1.52	+0.60
Turnout		25,513	78.68	+0.90
Eligible voters		32,426		
Liberal gain from Co-operative Commonwealth		Swing		+6.85
Source: Library of Parliament

1935 Canadian federal election
Party	Candidate	Votes	%	±%
Co-operative Commonwealth	James Samuel Taylor	7,053	34.84	–
Conservative	Charles Dickie	6,440	31.81	–26.10
Liberal	Alan Chambers	6,204	30.65	–11.44
Reconstruction	Ashton Aubrey Burnet Clark	546	2.70	–
Total valid votes		20,243	99.08	
Total rejected ballots		188	0.92	+0.92
Turnout		20,431	77.79	+6.36
Eligible voters		26,266		
Co-operative Commonwealth gain from Conservative		Swing		+30.42
Source: Library of Parliament

1930 Canadian federal election
Party	Candidate	Votes	%	±%
Conservative	Charles Dickie	11,827	57.91	–8.58
Liberal	Cornelius Hawkins O'Halloran	8,596	42.09	+8.58
Total valid votes		20,423	100.00	
Total rejected ballots		–		
Turnout		20,423	71.43	+9.08
Eligible voters		28,593		
Conservative hold		Swing		–8.58
Source: Library of Parliament

1926 Canadian federal election
Party	Candidate	Votes	%	±%
Conservative	Charles Dickie	10,464	66.49	+12.00
Liberal	Cornelius Hawkins O'Halloran	5,274	33.51	–1.27
Total valid votes		15,738	100.00	
Total rejected ballots		–		
Turnout		15,738	62.34	–12.78
Eligible voters		25,244		
Conservative hold		Swing		+6.64
Source: Library of Parliament

1925 Canadian federal election
Party	Candidate	Votes	%	±%
Conservative	Charles Dickie	9,584	54.49	+8.55
Liberal	Thomas Banks Booth	6,117	34.78	+7.08
Socialist	William Turner Grieves	1,888	10.73	–15.63
Total valid votes		17,589	100.00	
Total rejected ballots		–		
Turnout		17,589	75.12	+4.64
Eligible voters		23,413		
Conservative hold		Swing		+0.74
Source: Library of Parliament

1921 Canadian federal election
Party	Candidate	Votes	%	±%
Conservative	Charles Dickie	6,897	45.94	–27.49
Liberal	Thomas Banks Booth	4,159	27.70	+11.89
Labour	William Arthur Pritchard	3,958	26.36	+15.61
Total valid votes		15,014	100.00	
Total rejected ballots		–		
Turnout		15,014	70.49	–27.06
Eligible voters		21,300		
Conservative gain from Government (Unionist)		Swing		–19.69
Source: Library of Parliament

1917 Canadian federal election
Party	Candidate	Votes	%	±%
Government (Unionist)	John Charles McIntosh	9,175	73.43	+15.22
Opposition (Laurier Liberals)	Hector Allen Stewart	1,976	15.81	–25.98
Labour	Joseph Taylor	1,344	10.76	–
Total valid votes		12,495	100.00	
Total rejected ballots		–		
Turnout		12,495	97.55	+33.47
Eligible voters		12,809		
Government (Unionist) gain from Conservative		Swing		+20.60
Source: Library of Parliament

1911 Canadian federal election
Party	Candidate	Votes	%	±%
Conservative	Francis Henry Shepherd	2,438	58.21	+25.98
Liberal	Ralph Smith	1,750	41.79	+5.71
Total valid votes		4,188	100.00	
Total rejected ballots		–		
Turnout		4,188	64.08	–2.70
Eligible voters		6,536		
Conservative gain from Liberal		Swing		+10.13
Source: Library of Parliament

1908 Canadian federal election
Party	Candidate	Votes	%	±%
Liberal	Ralph Smith	1,494	36.08	–7.23
Conservative	Francis Henry Shepherd	1,335	32.24	–2.14
Socialist	James Hurst Hawthornthwaite	1,312	31.68	+9.37
Total valid votes		4,141	100.00	
Total rejected ballots		–		
Turnout		4,141	66.78	+4.37
Eligible voters		6,201		
Liberal hold		Swing		–2.54
Source: Library of Parliament

1904 Canadian federal election
Party	Candidate	Votes	%	±%
Liberal	Ralph Smith	1,392	43.31	–
Conservative	Clive Phillipps-Wolley	1,105	34.38	–
Socialist	William Fenton	717	22.31	–
Total valid votes		3,214	100.00	
Total rejected ballots		–		
Turnout		3,214	62.41	–
Eligible voters		5,150		
Liberal notional hold		Swing		–
This riding was created from Vancouver and Victoria, both of which elected a Liberal in the previous election. Ralph Smith was the incumbent from Vancouver.
Source: Library of Parliament

== See also ==
- List of Canadian electoral districts
- Historical federal electoral districts of Canada
