= Alan Chambers (Canadian politician) =

Canadian politician (1904–1981)

Member of Parliament for Nanaimo
- In office March 1940 – June 1945

Personal details
- Born: 14 January 1904 England
- Died: 1981 (aged 76–77)
- Party: Liberal
- Profession: Exporter, importer, merchant

Alan Chambers (14 January 1904 – 1981) was a Canadian businessman and politician. Chambers was a Liberal party member of the House of Commons of Canada.

Born in England, he was an exporter, importer and merchant by career. He was first elected to Parliament at the Nanaimo riding in the 1940 general election after an earlier unsuccessful attempt to win a seat there in 1935. After serving one term in the House of Commons, Chambers was defeated by George Pearkes of the Progressive Conservatives in the 1945 election.

Chambers became the European chief of the Department of Veterans Affairs after World War II where he worked for the remainder of his career.

He died in 1981.
