= Donald W. Munro =

Canadian politician (1916–1998)

Donald Wallace Munro (8 April 1916 – 28 July 1998) was a Progressive Conservative party member of the House of Commons of Canada. He was born in Regina, Saskatchewan and became a diplomat by career.

He represented British Columbia's Esquimalt—Saanich electoral district at which he won election in 1972. He was re-elected in the 1974, 1979 and 1980 federal elections. Munro left national politics in 1984 after serving in the 29th to 32nd Canadian Parliaments and did not campaign in any further federal elections.
