= Laurence Arnold Hanna =

Canadian politician

Laurence Arnold Hanna (March 22, 1892 – March 27, 1979) was a lawyer, judge and political figure in British Columbia. He represented Alberni from 1928 to 1933 and Comox from 1933 to 1937 in the Legislative Assembly of British Columbia as a Liberal. He served as deputy speaker of the Legislature from 1934 to 1937.

He was born in Gravenhurst, Ontario, the son of Joseph Francis Hanna and May Robena Sinclair. In 1917, Hanna married Anna Mary Miles. He served as mayor of Alberni for five years. Hanna was defeated by Colin Cameron when he ran for reelection in 1937. He later served as county court judge for Nanaimo County. Hanna died in Nanaimo at the age of 87.
