= Herbert John Welch =

Canadian politician

Herbert John Welch (October 27, 1894 – April 27, 1959) was a business owner and political figure in British Columbia. He represented Comox in the Legislative Assembly of British Columbia from 1945 to 1952 as a Liberal.

He was born in New Westminster, British Columbia, the son of Herbert Hatton Welch and Mary French, and was educated in Vancouver. In 1920, Welch married Helen Grace Clark. He served as a captain in the Royal Air Force.

Bert was co-founder and President of the Olympic Logging Company, which was formed in 1932. In 1949, the Olympic Logging Company was dissolved, and a new company named Olympic Forest Products Ltd. was formed with the same shareholders.

He served as chairman of the Board of Commissioners for Qualicum Beach. Welch was a member of a Liberal-Conservative coalition in the assembly. He was defeated when he ran for reelection in 1952. Welch died in Oak Bay.
