= Francis Henry Shepherd =

Canadian politician

Francis Henry Shepherd (September 30, 1857 – August 15, 1938) was an English-born civil engineer and political figure in British Columbia, Canada. He represented Nanaimo in the House of Commons of Canada from 1911 to 1917 as a Conservative.

He was born in Yorkshire, the son of George Shepherd and Mary Laurence, and was educated in England. He worked as an engineer at mines in Australia, New Zealand and the United States. Shepherd came to Nanaimo in 1879. In 1880, he married Jane Holden. Shepherd was Chief Inspector of Mines for British Columbia. He died in Creston, British Columbia at the age of 80.
