= George Kerr McNaughton =

Canadian politician (1877–1951)

MLA for Comox
- In office 1928–1933

Personal details
- Born: July 4, 1877 Black River-Hardwicke
- Died: September 15, 1951 (aged 74) Cumberland, British Columbia
- Party: Conservative
- Occupation: doctor

George Kerr McNaughton (July 4, 1877 – September 15, 1951) was a Canadian politician. He served in the Legislative Assembly of British Columbia from 1928 until his retirement at the 1933 provincial election, from the electoral district of Comox, as a Conservative. He was a doctor.
