= Ronald Okeden Alexander =

Canadian Army general

Major General Ronald Okeden Alexander, pictured here during World War II.

Major-General Ronald Okeden Alexander CB DSO (7 August 1888 – 28 July 1949) was a military officer in the Canadian Army, a District Officer, Commanding District No.4, Montreal (1936–38), Number 2 Toronto (1938–40) and Inspector General for Central Canada (1942–46). He commanded the Western coast defences of Canada during World War II.

== Military career ==
Alexander was the son of J.A. Alexander, Indian Civil Service, and was born in Kandy, Ceylon on 7 August 1888. He was educated at Bedford Modern School, On 21 June 1910 he was commissioned as an officer into The Royal Canadian Regiment.

During World War I he was mentioned in despatches three times throughout the conflict and was awarded the Distinguished Service Order in 1917.

Remaining in the army during the interwar period, where he attended the Staff College, Camberley and then served as Professor of Tactics at the Royal Military College of Canada from September 1924−December 1927. During World War II he was Inspector General of the armed forces in Central Canada and was a made a Companion of the Order of the Bath in 1944.

He died at the age of sixty in Saanich, British Columbia on 27 July 1949.
