= Michael Manson (politician) =

Canadian politician (1857–1932)

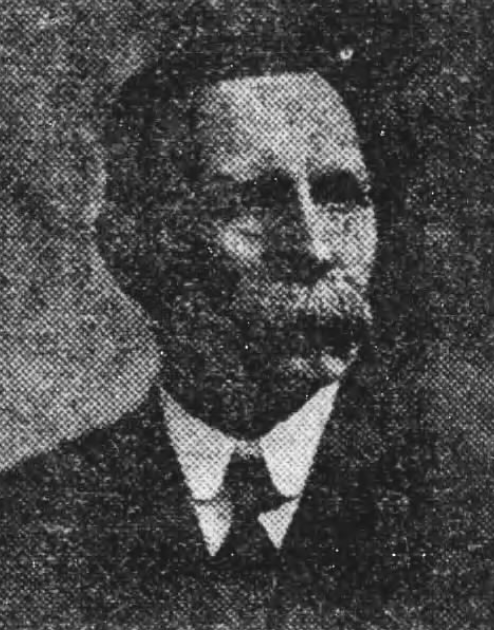

Member of the Legislative Assembly of British Columbia
- In office 1924–1932
- Constituency: Mackenzie

Member of the Legislative Assembly of British Columbia
- In office 1909–1916
- Constituency: Comox

Personal details
- Born: April 29, 1857 Pickigarth, Shetland Islands
- Died: July 11, 1932 (aged 75) Bella Coola, British Columbia
- Party: Conservative
- Spouse: Jane Renwick (m. 1879)
- Occupation: Farmer, politician

Michael Manson (April 29, 1857 – July 11, 1932) was a Scottish-born farmer and political figure in British Columbia. He represented Comox from 1909 to 1916 and Mackenzie from 1924 to 1933 in the Legislative Assembly of British Columbia as a Conservative.

== Biography ==
He was born in Pickigarth, Shetland Islands on April 29, 1857, the son of John Manson and Margaret Bain. He came to British Columbia in 1874. In 1879, Manson married Jane Renwick. He was a director of the Call Creek Oyster Company. Manson also served as a justice of the peace. From 1887 to 1895, he operated a trading post on Cortes Island with his brother John. He was defeated when he ran for reelection to the assembly in 1916. Manson died in Bella Coola on July 11, 1932, at the age of 75.

The community of Mansons Landing on Cortes Island is named after him.
