= William Campbell Moore =

Canadian politician and printer

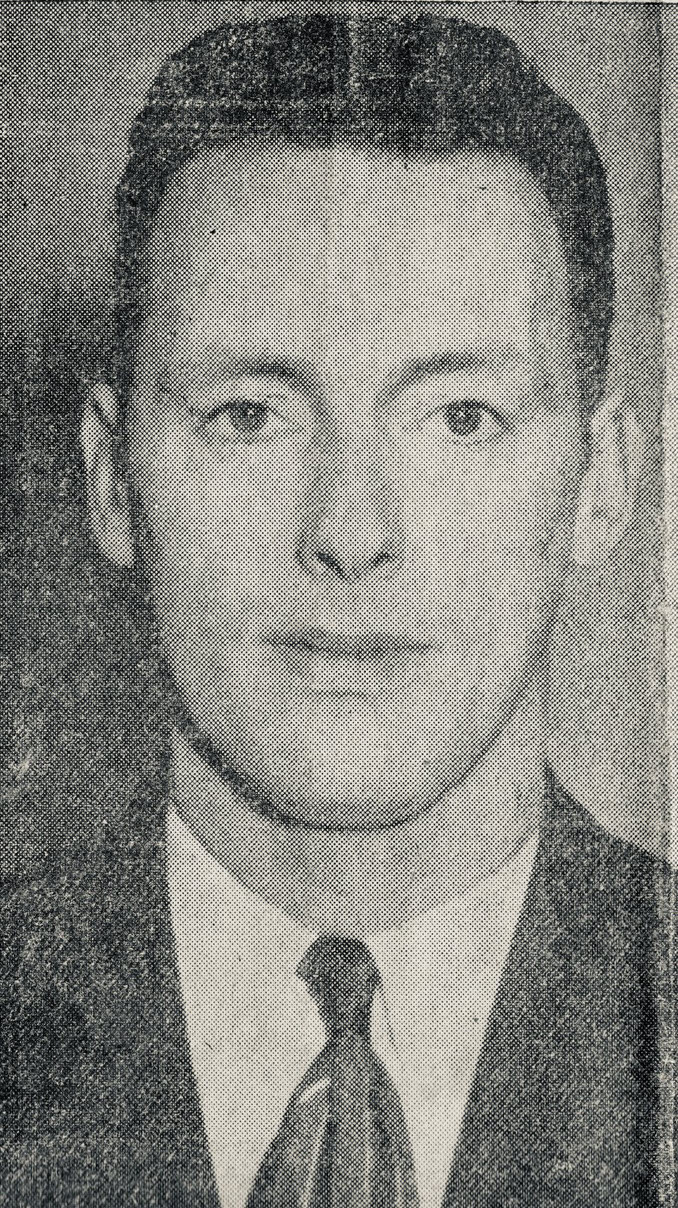

William Campbell "Bill" Moore (July 15, 1923 – August 25, 1982) was a printer and political figure in British Columbia, Canada. He represented Comox from 1952 to 1956 in the Legislative Assembly of British Columbia. Moore did not run for reelection in 1956.

He was born in Vancouver, British Columbia and then moved with his family to Courtenay where he was educated. Moore served in the Royal Canadian Navy during World War II. He worked for the Courtenay-Comox Argus and served as president of the International Typographical Union local. Moore was elected as an alderman for Courtenay in 1951 and later served as mayor. He died of a heart attack on a vacation to Seattle in 1982. He was 59.
