= Lewis Alfred Mounce =

Canadian lumberman politician from British Columbia (1857–1935)

MLA for Comox
- In office 1900–1903

Personal details
- Born: June 20, 1857 Avondale, Hants, Colony of Nova Scotia
- Died: August 23, 1935 (aged 78) Vancouver, British Columbia
- Party: British Columbia Conservative Party
- Spouse: Euphemia Frame
- Profession: Accountant

Lewis Alfred Mounce (June 20, 1857 – August 23, 1935) was a lumberman and political figure in British Columbia. He represented Comox in the Legislative Assembly of British Columbia from 1900 until his retirement at the 1903 provincial election.

He was born in Avondale, Hants County, Nova Scotia, the son of William Mounce, and was educated in Avondale and Sackville, New Brunswick. In 1889, Mounce married Euphemia Frame. He served as mayor of Cumberland from 1897 to 1898. In the 1900 election, even though there were no official party affiliations, Mounce campaigned as a supporter of the Conservative Party. He died in Vancouver at the age of 78.
