= List of members of the Canadian House of Commons with military service (M) =

Name	Elected party	Constituency	Elected date	Military service
Al MacBain	Liberal	Niagara Falls	February 18, 1980	Canadian Army
Albert Frederick Macdonald	Liberal	Edmonton East	June 27, 1949	Canadian Army (1940-1943)
Angus Lewis MacDonald	Liberal	Kingston City	August 12, 1940	Canadian Army (1918-)
Daniel Joseph MacDonald	Liberal	Cardigan	October 30, 1972	Canadian Army (1940-1945)
Donald Alexander MacDonald	Liberal	Glengarry	September 20, 1867	Militia (1852-1869)
Hugh John MacDonald	Liberal-Conservative	Winnipeg	March 5, 1891	Militia (1866-)
John Augustine Macdonald	Progressive Conservative	King's	June 10, 1957	Canadian Army (1939-1944)
William Chisholm MacDonald	Liberal	Halifax	March 26, 1940	Canadian Army (1917-1918)
William Ross Macdonald	Liberal	Brantford City	October 14, 1935	Canadian Army (1914-1918)
James MacKerras MacDonnell	Progressive Conservative	Muskoka—Ontario	June 11, 1945	Canadian Army
John Lorne MacDougall	Liberal	Vancouver—Burrard	June 27, 1949	Royal Canadian Navy
Day Hort MacDowall	Conservative	Saskatchewan (Provisional District)	February 22, 1887	Militia
Russell MacEwan	Progressive Conservative	Pictou	June 10, 1957	Canadian Army
Gus MacFarlane	Liberal	Hamilton Mountain	July 8, 1974	Royal Canadian Air Force (1943-1945)
John Armstrong MacKelvie	Conservative	Yale	November 22, 1920	Militia
Alexander Mackenzie	Liberal	Lambton	September 20, 1867	Militia (1866-1874)
Frederick Donald Mackenzie	Liberal	Neepawa	October 14, 1935	Canadian Army (1915-1919)
Ian Alistair Mackenzie	Liberal	Vancouver Centre	July 28, 1930	Canadian Army
Herbert John Mackie	Unionist	Renfrew North	December 17, 1917	Militia (1899-1908)
Murray MacLaren	Conservative	St. John—Albert	December 6, 1921	Canadian Army (1908-1919)
William Scott MacLaren	Liberal	Huntingdon	November 7, 1900	Militia (1863-1889)
John Angus MacLean	Progressive Conservative	Queen's	June 25, 1951	Royal Canadian Air Force (1939-1947)
Cyrus MacMillan	Liberal	Queen's	March 26, 1940	Canadian Army (1916-1919)
Charles Grant MacNeil	Cooperative Commonwealth Federation	Vancouver North	October 14, 1935	Canadian Army
John Chester MacRae	Progressive Conservative	York—Sunbury	June 10, 1957	Canadian Army (1934-1956)
John Ellwood Madill	Progressive Conservative	Dufferin—Simcoe	April 8, 1963	Royal Canadian Air Force (1942-1945)
Robert Benoit Major	Liberal	Argenteuil	June 25, 1968	Canadian Army (1942-1945)
Henry Philip Mang	Liberal	Qu'Appelle	August 10, 1953	Royal Flying Corps (1918)
Robert James Manion	Unionist	Fort William and Rainy River	December 17, 1917	Canadian Army (1915-1945), French Army (1915)
Park Manross	Progressive Conservative	London	June 11, 1945	Canadian Army (1917-1920)
George Carlyle Marler	Liberal	Saint-Antoine—Westmount	November 8, 1954	Royal Canadian Navy (1917-1942)
Herbert Meredith Marler	Liberal	St. Lawrence—St. George	December 6, 1921	Canadian Army
Jack Marshall	Progressive Conservative	Humber—St. George's—St. Barbe	June 25, 1968	Royal Newfoundland Regiment, Canadian Forces Land Force Command
Alan Gray Martin	Liberal	Scarborough West	July 8, 1974	Canadian Army (1947-1965)
Murdo Martin	Cooperative Commonwealth Federation	Timmins	June 10, 1957	Canadian Army
Paul Raymond Martineau	Progressive Conservative	Pontiac—Témiscamingue	March 31, 1958	Royal Canadian Air Force (1942-1946)
Peter Masniuk	Progressive Conservative	Portage	October 30, 1972	Canadian Army
Paul-André Massé	Liberal	Saint-Jean	May 22, 1979	Canadian Army (1967-1968), Canadian Forces Land Force Command (1968-1973)
Denton Massey	Conservative	Greenwood	October 14, 1935	Royal Canadian Air Force
Louis-François-Rodrigue Masson	Conservative	Terrebonne	September 20, 1867	Militia (1863-1868)
Luc Hyacinthe Masson	Conservative	Soulanges	September 20, 1867	Militia
John Ross Matheson	Liberal	Leeds	May 29, 1961	Canadian Army (1940-1944)
Walter Franklyn Matthews	Progressive Conservative	Nanaimo	March 31, 1958	Royal Flying Corps (1917-1918), Royal Air Force (1918)
Fred Alward McCain	Progressive Conservative	Carleton—Charlotte	October 30, 1972	Canadian Army (1945-1946)
Lachlan McCallum	Liberal-Conservative	Monck	September 20, 1867	Militia
Ian McClelland	Reform	Edmonton Southwest	October 25, 1993	Royal Canadian Navy (1959-1961)
Peter L. McCreath	Progressive Conservative	South Shore	November 21, 1988	Royal Canadian Navy (1962-1968), Canadian Forces Maritime Command (1968-1971)
Karen McCrimmon	Liberal	Kanata—Carleton	October 15, 2015	Canadian Army (1975–1980); Royal Canadian Air Force (1980–2006)
Robert Lorne McCuish	Progressive Conservative	Prince George—Bulkley Valley	May 22, 1979	Royal Canadian Air Force (1942-1945)
Emmett Andrew McCusker	Liberal	Regina City	June 27, 1949	Canadian Army (1915-1943)
Frank Charles McGee	Progressive Conservative	York—Scarborough	June 10, 1957	Royal Canadian Air Force (1943-1945)
Peter McGibbon	Unionist	Muskoka	December 17, 1917	British Army
John Alexander McGillivray	Liberal-Conservative	Ontario North	December 12, 1895	Militia (1902-1906)
John "Jack" McIntosh	Progressive Conservative	Swift Current—Maple Creek	March 31, 1958	Canadian Army
Eric Bowness McKay	Cooperative Commonwealth Federation	Weyburn	June 11, 1945	Royal Canadian Air Force (1941-1945)
James McKay	Conservative	Prince Albert	September 21, 1911	Militia (1885)
James Charles McKeagney	Anti-Confederate	Cape Breton	September 20, 1867	Militia
Allan Bruce Mckinnon	Progressive Conservative	Victoria	October 30, 1972	Canadian Army (1939-1965)
Allan Marcus Atkinson McLean	Liberal	Charlotte	June 18, 1962	Canadian Army
Andrew Young McLean	Liberal	Huron—Perth	June 27, 1949	Royal Canadian Air Force (1942-1946)
George Alexander McLean	Liberal	Simcoe East	October 14, 1935	Canadian Army (1914-1919)
Hugh Havelock McLean	Liberal	Sunbury—Queen's	October 26, 1908	Canadian Army (1916-)
Malcolm McLean	Liberal	Melfort	October 29, 1925	Canadian Army
Walter Franklin McLean	Progressive Conservative	Waterloo	May 22, 1979	Royal Canadian Air Force
Roderick R. McLellan	Conservative	Glengarry	March 5, 1891	Militia
Harry Fulton McLeod	Conservative	York	December 31, 1913	Canadian Army
William Alexander McMaster	Progressive Conservative	High Park	June 11, 1945	Canadian Army (1917-1919)
William Hector McMillan	Liberal	Welland	October 16, 1950	Canadian Army (1916-1919)
Albert De Burgo McPhillips	Progressive Conservative	Victoria	June 10, 1957	Canadian Army (1940-1946)
Alexander Duncan McRae	Conservative	Vancouver North	September 14, 1926	Canadian Army (-1916)
James McShane	Liberal	Montreal Centre	December 27, 1895	Militia (1866-)
Edward Watson "Ted" McWhinney	Liberal	Vancouver Quadra	October 25, 1993	Royal Canadian Air Force (1943-1945)
Paul Mercier	Bloc Québécois	Blainville—Deux-Montagnes	October 25, 1993	Belgian Army (1944-1945)
Gerry Merrithew	Progressive Conservative	Saint John	September 4, 1984	Canadian Army
Charles Cecil Ingersoll Merritt	Progressive Conservative Party of Canada	Vancouver—Burrard	June 11, 1945	Canadian Army (1929-)
Sydney Chilton Mewburn	Unionist	Hamilton East	December 17, 1917	Canadian Army (1910-)
Daniel Roland Michener	Progressive Conservative	St. Paul's	August 10, 1953	Royal Air Force (1918)
Fred J. Mifflin	Liberal	Bonavista—Trinity—Conception	November 21, 1988	Royal Canadian Navy (1954-1968), Canadian Forces Maritime Command (1969-1987)
Campbell Ewing Millar	Progressive Conservative	Middlesex East	June 18, 1962	Royal Canadian Air Force (1940-1945)
Humphrey Mitchell	Labour	Hamilton East	August 10, 1931	Royal Navy
Robert Weld Mitchell	Progressive Conservative	London	August 10, 1953	Canadian Army (1940-1945)
Jean Baptiste Mongenais	Conservative	Vaudreuil	September 17, 1878	Militia (1869-)
Gage W. Montgomery	Progressive Conservative	Victoria—Carleton	May 26, 1952	Canadian Army
Christine Moore	NDP	Abitibi—Témiscamingue	May 2, 2011	Canadian Army (2005)
Ronald Moore	Cooperative Commonwealth Federation	Churchill	June 11, 1945	Royal Canadian Navy (1942-1945)
John B. Morison	Liberal	Wentworth	April 8, 1963	Royal Canadian Air Force (1941-1945)
Murray Douglas Morton	Progressive Conservative	Davenport	June 10, 1957	Canadian Army
William Malcolm Mott	Liberal	New Westminster	October 24, 1949	Canadian Army
Herbert Mowat	Unionist	Parkdale	December 17, 1917	Canadian Army (1916-)
George Robson Muir	Progressive Conservative	Lisgar	June 10, 1957	Canadian Army (1924-)
Henry Alfred Mullins	Conservative	Marquette	October 29, 1925	Canadian Army (1915-1918)
William Pate Mulock	Liberal	York North	September 24, 1934	Canadian Army (1918-1919)
Donald W. Munro	Progressive Conservative	Esquimalt—Saanich	October 30, 1972	Royal Canadian Air Force (1940-1945)
Henry J. Murphy	Liberal	Westmorland	August 10, 1953	Canadian Army, Canadian Merchant Navy
Leslie Hutch	Liberal	Winnipeg South	October 14, 1935	Canadian Army (1914-1945)
