= Victoria (federal electoral district) =

Federal electoral district in British Columbia, Canada

Coordinates: 48.4°N 123.3°W

British Columbia electoral district
- Interactive map of riding boundaries from the 1988 federal election

Federal electoral district
- Legislature: House of Commons
MP
Will Greaves
Liberal
- District created: 1924
- First contested: 1925
- Last contested: 2025
- District webpage: profile, map

Demographics
- Population (2016): 117,133
- Electors (2015): 90,217
- Area (km²): 40.28
- Pop. density (per km²): 2,908
- Census division: Capital Regional District
- Census subdivision(s): Saanich (part), Victoria, Oak Bay

Victoria is a federal electoral district in British Columbia, Canada, that has been represented in the House of Commons of Canada from 1872 to 1904 and since 1925.

The riding was originally chartered as Victoria District for the special byelections held in 1871 upon the province's entry into Confederation. Like the other B.C. ridings with that appellation, however, the "District" was dropped once the temporary ridings were ratified and made "permanent" for the general election of 1872; this was the first in which the Victoria riding (by that name) appeared. From 1905 up until the 1925 election, Victoria was represented by the riding of Victoria City.

== Demographics ==
Panethnic groups in Victoria (2011−2021)
Panethnic group	2021		2016		2011	
Panethnic group	Pop.	%	Pop.	%	Pop.	%
European (Note: Statistic includes all persons that did not make up part of a visible minority or an indigenous identity.)	93,640	78.54%	90,880	81.08%	89,535	84.42%
East Asian (Note: Statistic includes total responses of "Chinese", "Korean", and "Japanese" under visible minority section on census.)	7,245	6.08%	7,180	6.41%	5,435	5.12%
Indigenous	5,180	4.34%	4,325	3.86%	4,035	3.8%
Southeast Asian (Note: Statistic includes total responses of "Filipino" and "Southeast Asian" under visible minority section on census.)	3,820	3.2%	2,880	2.57%	2,140	2.02%
South Asian	3,450	2.89%	2,390	2.13%	1,665	1.57%
African	1,835	1.54%	1,280	1.14%	995	0.94%
Middle Eastern (Note: Statistic includes total responses of "West Asian" and "Arab" under visible minority section on census.)	1,505	1.26%	1,425	1.27%	900	0.85%
Latin American	1,425	1.2%	980	0.87%	645	0.61%
Other (Note: Statistic includes total responses of "Visible minority, n.i.e." and "Multiple visible minorities" under visible minority section on census.)	1,135	0.95%	740	0.66%	705	0.66%
Total responses	119,230	96.56%	112,080	95.69%	106,055	95.59%
Total population	123,482	100%	117,133	100%	110,942	100%
Notes: Totals greater than 100% due to multiple origin responses. Demographics based on 2012 Canadian federal electoral redistribution riding boundaries.

Ethnic groups (2006): 85.54% White, 4.05% Chinese, 3.07% Aboriginal, 1.26% South Asian, 1.22% Japanese, 1.15% Filipino, 1.09% Black
Languages (2011): 83.93% English, 2.92% Chinese, 1.79% French, 1.40% German
Religions (2001): 35.36% Protestant, 15.05% Catholic, 3.94% Other Christian, 1.62% Buddhist, 40.52% No religion
Median income (2005): $24,022

== Geography ==
It covers the entire city of Victoria, the municipality of Oak Bay and the southeastern portion of the municipality of Saanich. It also includes the University of Victoria.

== History ==
This electoral district was created in 1872 when Victoria District riding was abolished. It elected two members to the House of Commons of Canada through Block voting. Of the two it elected in 1872, one (Henry Nathan Jr.) was the first Jewish MP of Canada; the other (William Alexander "Amor De Cosmos" Smith) served as MP while also serving as premier of British Columbia.

In 1878, Sir John A. Macdonald was parachuted into the riding, as he was unelectable in eastern Canada, in the wake of the Pacific Scandal. Macdonald, previously the MP for the Marquette riding in Manitoba, had to run in a by-election as he had been appointed to the cabinet (to serve as prime minister). He chose Victoria, which had not yet held its portion of the 1878 Canadian federal election. Victorians voted for him enthusiastically, as he promised to finally bring about the construction of what became the Canadian Pacific Railway. He did not run for re-election in Victoria, instead securing a safe seat in Ontario in 1882.

It was abolished in 1903, and its territory was divided between the new single-member ridings of Victoria City and Nanaimo.

It was re-created in 1924 from the Victoria City riding, electing one member to the House of Commons.

A redistribution in 1966 trimmed the size of the riding slightly, removing parts of Saanich west of Cedar Hill Road and north of Cedar Hill Cross Road.

Victoria was one of two electoral districts in British Columbia that saw no changes to its boundaries proposed following the 2012 federal electoral boundaries redistribution.

=== Members of Parliament ===
This riding has elected the following members of Parliament:

Parliament	Years	Member	Party	Member	Party
Victoria; Riding created from Victoria District
2nd	1872–1874	Henry Nathan, Jr.	Liberal	Amor De Cosmos	Liberal
3rd	1874–1878	Francis James Roscoe	Independent Liberal	Amor De Cosmos	Liberal
4th	1878–1882	John A. Macdonald	Liberal–Conservative	Amor De Cosmos	Liberal
5th	1882–1887	Noah Shakespeare	Conservative	Edgar Crow Baker	Conservative
6th	1887	Noah Shakespeare	Conservative	Edgar Crow Baker	Conservative
6th	1888–1889	Edward Gawler Prior	Conservative	Edgar Crow Baker	Conservative
6th	1889–1891	Edward Gawler Prior	Conservative	Thomas Earle	Conservative
7th	1891–1896	Edward Gawler Prior	Conservative	Thomas Earle	Conservative
8th	1896–1900	Edward Gawler Prior	Conservative	Thomas Earle	Conservative
9th	1900–1902	Edward Gawler Prior	Conservative	Thomas Earle	Conservative
9th	1902–1904	George Riley	Liberal	Thomas Earle	Conservative
Riding dissolved into Victoria City and Nanaimo
Victoria; Riding re-created from Victoria City
15th	1925–1926	Simon Fraser Tolmie	Conservative		
16th	1926–1928	Simon Fraser Tolmie	Conservative		
16th	1928–1930	D'Arcy Plunkett	Conservative		
17th	1930–1935	D'Arcy Plunkett	Conservative		
18th	1935–1936†	D'Arcy Plunkett	Conservative		
18th	1936–1937†	Simon Fraser Tolmie	Conservative		
18th	1937–1940	Robert Mayhew	Liberal		
19th	1940–1945	Robert Mayhew	Liberal		
20th	1945–1949	Robert Mayhew	Liberal		
21st	1949–1953	Robert Mayhew	Liberal		
22nd	1953–1957	Francis Fairey	Liberal		
23rd	1957–1958	Albert McPhillips	Progressive Conservative		
24th	1958–1962	Albert McPhillips	Progressive Conservative		
25th	1962–1963	Albert McPhillips	Progressive Conservative		
26th	1963–1965	David Groos	Liberal		
27th	1965–1968	David Groos	Liberal		
28th	1968–1972	David Groos	Liberal		
29th	1972–1974	Allan McKinnon	Progressive Conservative		
30th	1974–1979	Allan McKinnon	Progressive Conservative		
31st	1979–1980	Allan McKinnon	Progressive Conservative		
32nd	1980–1984	Allan McKinnon	Progressive Conservative		
33rd	1984–1988	Allan McKinnon	Progressive Conservative		
34th	1988–1993	John Brewin	New Democratic		
35th	1993–1997	David Anderson	Liberal		
36th	1997–2000	David Anderson	Liberal		
37th	2000–2004	David Anderson	Liberal		
38th	2004–2006	David Anderson	Liberal		
39th	2006–2008	Denise Savoie	New Democratic		
40th	2008–2011	Denise Savoie	New Democratic		
41st	2011–2012	Denise Savoie	New Democratic		
41st	2012–2015	Murray Rankin	New Democratic		
42nd	2015–2019	Murray Rankin	New Democratic		
43rd	2019–2021	Laurel Collins	New Democratic		
44th	2021–2025	Laurel Collins	New Democratic		
45th	2025–present	Will Greaves	Liberal		

=== Current member of Parliament ===
The current member of Parliament for Victoria is Will Greaves. He is a member of the Liberal Party of Canada.

== Riding associations ==
Riding associations are the local branches of political parties:

Party	Association name	President
Conservative	Victoria Conservative Association	Timothy Stonhouse
Green	Victoria Green Party Association	Bruce G. Livingstone
Liberal	Victoria Federal Liberal Association	Allan G. Hurd
New Democratic	Victoria Federal NDP Riding Association	Liam Lawson-Tattersall
People's	Vancouver Island Regional PPC Association	Serryna Whiteside

== Election results ==
=== 1925–present ===
The Victoria riding name was re-established as a one-member seat in 1924.

2025 Canadian federal election: Victoria
Party	Candidate	Votes	%	±%	Expenditures
Liberal	Will Greaves	41,128	54.28	+27.02	$125,500.20
New Democratic	Laurel Collins	18,877	24.91	–18.98	$113,060.85
Conservative	Angus Ross	12,870	16.99	+3.28	$73,190.29
Green	Michael Doherty	2,350	3.10	–8.09	$20,849.60
People's	David Mohr	278	0.37	–2.72	$1,093.92
Rhinoceros	Cody Fraser	109	0.14	–	none listed
Christian Heritage	Mary Moreau	83	0.11	–	$550.00
Independent	Steve Filipovic	73	0.10	–	$279.78
Total valid votes/expense limit		75,768	99.51	–	$146,326.64
Total rejected ballots		370	0.49	–0.21	
Turnout		76,138	74.41	+7.96	
Eligible voters		102,322			
Liberal gain from New Democratic		Swing		+23.00	
Source: Elections Canada

2021 Canadian federal election: Victoria
Party	Candidate	Votes	%	±%	Expenditures
New Democratic	Laurel Collins	29,301	43.90	+10.68	$97,858.71
Liberal	Nikki Macdonald	18,194	27.26	+4.96	$97,566.80
Conservative	Hannah Hodson	9,152	13.71	+1.08	$18,401.29
Green	Nick Loughton	7,472	11.19	–18.69	$93,634.92
People's	John Randal Phipps	2,065	3.09	+1.81	$7,982.12
Communist	Janis Zroback	291	0.44	+0.28	none listed
Animal Protection	Jordan Reichert	273	0.41	+0.10	$2,364.23
Total valid votes/expense limit		66,748	99.30	–	$126,387.28
Total rejected ballots		468	0.70	+0.04	
Turnout		67,216	66.45	–6.22	
Eligible voters		101,151			
New Democratic hold		Swing		+2.86	
Source: Elections Canada

2019 Canadian federal election: Victoria
Party	Candidate	Votes	%	±%	Expenditures
New Democratic	Laurel Collins	23,765	33.21	–9.06	$112,599.16
Green	Racelle Kooy	21,383	29.89	–3.03	$82,718.49
Liberal	Nikki Macdonald	15,952	22.30	+10.49	$83,095.70
Conservative	Richard Caron	9,038	12.63	+0.84	$41,312.21
People's	Alyson Culbert	920	1.29	–	$5,286.41
Animal Protection	Jordan Reichert	221	0.31	+0.03	$2,270.91
Communist	Robert Duncan	113	0.16	–	$480.62
Independent	David Michael Shebib	111	0.16	–	none listed
Veterans Coalition	Keith Rosenberg	46	0.06	–	none listed
Total valid votes/expense limit		71,549	99.34	–	$121,316.37
Total rejected ballots		475	0.66	+0.33	
Turnout		72,024	72.68	–3.56	
Eligible voters		99,103			
New Democratic hold		Swing		–3.02	
Source: Elections Canada

2015 Canadian federal election: Victoria
Party	Candidate	Votes	%	±%	Expenditures
New Democratic	Murray Rankin	30,397	42.28	+5.11	$222,151.95
Green	Jo-Ann Roberts	23,666	32.92	–1.39	$147,733.88
Liberal	Cheryl Thomas	8,489	11.81	–1.25	$36,120.06
Conservative	John Rizzuti	8,480	11.79	–2.69	$72,891.79
Libertarian	Art Lowe	539	0.75	+0.26	$900.00
Animal Alliance	Jordan Reichert	200	0.28	–	$10,110.17
Independent	Saul Andersen	124	0.17	–	none listed
Total valid votes/expense limit		71,895	99.67	–	$234,268.29
Total rejected ballots		241	0.33	+0.08	
Turnout		72,136	76.23	+33.20	
Eligible voters		94,627			
New Democratic hold		Swing		+3.25	
Cheryl Thomas resigned prior to the election.
Source: Elections Canada

Canadian federal by-election, November 26, 2012: Victoria After the resignation of Denise Savoie
Party	Candidate	Votes	%	±%	Expenditures
New Democratic	Murray Rankin	14,507	37.17	–13.61	$96,326.89
Green	Donald Galloway	13,389	34.30	+22.69	$97,263.91
Conservative	Dale Gann	5,654	14.49	–9.14	$90,730.65
Liberal	Paul Summerville	5,097	13.06	–0.92	$80,233.82
Libertarian	Art Lowe	193	0.49	–	$496.00
Christian Heritage	Philip G. Ney	192	0.49	–	$3,499.07
Total valid votes/expense limit		39,032	99.75	–	$97,992.97
Total rejected ballots		98	0.25	–0.09	
Turnout		39,130	43.03	–24.52	
Eligible voters		90,942			
New Democratic hold		Swing		–18.15	
Source: Elections Canada

2011 Canadian federal election: Victoria
Party	Candidate	Votes	%	±%	Expenditures
New Democratic	Denise Savoie	30,679	50.78	+6.17	$71,217.86
Conservative	G. Patrick Hunt	14,275	23.63	–3.93	$83,240.49
Liberal	Christopher Causton	8,448	13.98	–2.90	$86,129.05
Green	Jared Giesbrecht	7,015	11.61	+1.06	$32,044.24
Total valid votes/expense limit		60,417	99.66	–	$93,244.49
Total rejected ballots		208	0.34	+0.03	
Turnout		60,625	67.55	+0.07	
Eligible voters		89,750			
New Democratic hold		Swing		+5.05	
Source: Elections Canada

2008 Canadian federal election: Victoria
Party	Candidate	Votes	%	±%	Expenditures
New Democratic	Denise Savoie	26,443	44.61	+6.15	$80,713.26
Conservative	Jack McClintock	16,337	27.56	+2.96	$81,273.79
Liberal	Anne Park Shannon	10,006	16.88	–10.64	$46,753.89
Green	Adam Saab	6,252	10.55	+2.42	$25,997.43
Christian Heritage	John Cooper	237	0.40	–	$310.45
Total valid votes/expense limit		59,275	99.69	–	$89,794.37
Total rejected ballots		184	0.31	+0.04	
Turnout		59,459	67.48	–3.51	
Eligible voters		88,118			
New Democratic hold		Swing		+1.60	
Source: Elections Canada

2006 Canadian federal election: Victoria
Party	Candidate	Votes	%	±%	Expenditures
New Democratic	Denise Savoie	23,839	38.46	+7.38	$71,761.10
Liberal	David Mulroney	17,056	27.52	–7.52	$82,142.49
Conservative	Robin Baird	15,249	24.60	+2.77	$82,505.52
Green	Ariel Lade	5,036	8.13	–3.57	$25,332.21
Marijuana	Fred Mallach	311	0.50	–	$8,108.65
Independent	Saul Andersen	282	0.45	–	$409.18
Western Block	Bruce Burnett	208	0.34	–	$141.05
Total valid votes/expense limit		61,981	99.73	–	$84,192.60
Total rejected ballots		167	0.27	–0.02	
Turnout		62,148	70.99	+2.58	
Eligible voters		87,546			
New Democratic gain from Liberal		Swing		+7.45	
Source: Elections Canada

2004 Canadian federal election: Victoria
Party	Candidate	Votes	%	±%	Expenditures
Liberal	David Anderson	20,398	35.04	–7.61	$77,645.56
New Democratic	David Turner	18,093	31.08	+18.06	$58,623.72
Conservative	Logan Wenham	12,708	21.83	–14.35	$73,000.83
Green	Ariel Lade	6,807	11.69	+5.83	$32,630.96
Canadian Action	Derek J. Skinner	206	0.35	–	$2,949.22
Total valid votes/expense limit		58,212	99.71	–	$80,896.34
Total rejected ballots		169	0.29	–0.08	
Turnout		58,381	68.41	+4.86	
Eligible voters		85,340			
Liberal hold		Swing		–12.84	
Source: Elections Canada

2000 Canadian federal election: Victoria
Party	Candidate	Votes	%	±%	Expenditures
Liberal	David Anderson	23,730	42.65	+7.89	$69,260
Alliance	Bruce Hallsor	16,502	29.66	+0.15	$65,598
New Democratic	David Turner	7,243	13.02	–8.87	$51,776
Progressive Conservative	Brian Burchill	3,629	6.52	–0.36	$6,889
Green	Joan Russow	3,264	5.87	+0.49	$19,737
Marijuana	Chuck Beyer	863	1.55	–	$975
Natural Law	Calvin Danyluk	138	0.25	–0.40	none listed
Independent	Lorenzo A. Bouchard	101	0.18	–	none listed
Communist	Scott Rushton	92	0.17	–	$189
Independent	Mary Moreau	75	0.13	–	none listed
Total valid votes		55,637	99.63		
Total rejected ballots		204	0.37	–0.09	
Turnout		55,841	63.55	–4.97	
Eligible voters		87,866			
Liberal hold		Swing		+3.88	
Source: Elections Canada

1997 Canadian federal election: Victoria
Party	Candidate	Votes	%	±%	Expenditures
Liberal	David Anderson	18,130	34.76	–2.45	$60,758
Reform	Arla Taylor	15,393	29.51	+1.93	$53,976
New Democratic	Carol Judd	11,419	21.89	+7.77	$54,055
Progressive Conservative	John J.P. King	3,589	6.88	–3.56	$14,767
Green	Joan Russow	2,806	5.38	+3.42	$2,912
Canadian Action	Brian Burchill	353	0.68	–	$3,521
Natural Law	Calvin Danyluk	340	0.65	–0.22	$321
Independent	Bob O'Neill	131	0.25	–	$1,045
Total valid votes		52,161	99.54		
Total rejected ballots		241	0.46	–0.11	
Turnout		52,402	68.52	+4.53	
Eligible voters		76,479			
Liberal hold		Swing		–2.19	
Source: Elections Canada

1993 Canadian federal election: Victoria
Party	Candidate	Votes	%	±%
Liberal	David Anderson	21,557	37.21	+15.82
Reform	G. Patrick Hunt	15,978	27.58	+19.18
New Democratic	John Brewin	8,182	14.12	–23.84
Progressive Conservative	Faith Collins	6,049	10.44	–19.49
National	Cecilia Mavrow	4,072	7.03	–
Green	Donna Morton	1,135	1.96	+0.20
Natural Law	Michael Coon	505	0.87	–
Libertarian	R. Kent Cowan	171	0.30	–
Independent	Roger Rocan	121	0.21	–
Canada Party	V. Anne Foss	73	0.13	–
Independent	Rhyon Caldwell	49	0.08	–
Independent	John Currie	45	0.08	–
Total valid votes		57,937	99.43	
Total rejected ballots		332	0.57	+0.26
Turnout		58,269	63.99	–15.99
Eligible voters		91,060		
Liberal gain from New Democratic		Swing		+19.83
Source: Elections Canada

1988 Canadian federal election: Victoria
Party	Candidate	Votes	%	±%
New Democratic	John Brewin	22,399	37.97	–0.63
Progressive Conservative	Geoff Young	17,660	29.93	–16.41
Liberal	Michael James O'Connor	12,617	21.39	+8.75
Reform	Terry Volb	4,956	8.40	–
Green	Laura K. Porcher	1,037	1.76	+0.67
Rhinoceros	J.C. Reverent Hicks	209	0.35	–0.14
Independent	John A. Harter	121	0.21	–
Total valid votes		58,999	99.69	
Total rejected ballots		184	0.31	–0.15
Turnout		59,183	79.98	+1.92
Eligible voters		73,993		
New Democratic gain from Progressive Conservative		Swing		+7.89
Source: Elections Canada

1984 Canadian federal election: Victoria
Party	Candidate	Votes	%	±%
Progressive Conservative	Allan McKinnon	24,588	46.34	–4.00
New Democratic	John Brewin	20,480	38.60	+4.28
Liberal	Jane Heffelfinger	6,702	12.63	–1.72
Green	John F. Knight	575	1.08	–
Rhinoceros	Dapper Dan Lindsay	262	0.49	–0.40
Libertarian	Bill J. McElwayn	187	0.35	–
Confederation of Regions	Elizabeth James	162	0.31	–
Independent	Johannes Jensen-Balther	104	0.20	–
Total valid votes		53,060	99.54	
Total rejected ballots		243	0.46	+0.14
Turnout		53,303	78.07	+7.25
Eligible voters		68,279		
Progressive Conservative hold		Swing		–4.14
Source: Elections Canada

==== 1925-1984 ====
Graph of election results in Victoria (1925–1980, minor parties that never got 2% of the vote or didn't run consistently are omitted) View source data.

1980 Canadian federal election: Victoria
Party	Candidate	Votes	%	±%
Progressive Conservative	Allan McKinnon	25,068	50.34	–4.39
New Democratic	Robin Blencoe	17,088	34.32	+4.38
Liberal	Bruce E. Corbett	7,145	14.35	–0.80
Rhinoceros	Rhino Kirk Higgins	446	0.90	–
Marxist–Leninist	Dorothy Ratzlaff	47	0.09	–0.08
Total valid votes		49,794	99.68	
Total rejected ballots		158	0.32	–0.05
Turnout		49,952	70.81	–6.07
Eligible voters		70,539		
Progressive Conservative hold		Swing		–4.40
Source: Elections Canada

1979 Canadian federal election: Victoria
Party	Candidate	Votes	%	±%
Progressive Conservative	Allan McKinnon	28,058	54.74	–0.60
New Democratic	Gretchen Brewin	15,344	29.93	+15.24
Liberal	Robert Monoghan	7,766	15.15	–14.39
Marxist–Leninist	Dorothy Ratzlaff	91	0.18	–0.26
Total valid votes		51,259	99.63	
Total rejected ballots		188	0.37	–0.04
Turnout		51,447	76.89	+2.11
Eligible voters		66,913		
Progressive Conservative hold		Swing		–7.92
Source: Elections Canada

1974 Canadian federal election: Victoria
Party	Candidate	Votes	%	±%
Progressive Conservative	Allan McKinnon	26,771	55.34	+7.86
Liberal	Frances H. Elford	14,289	29.54	+4.04
New Democratic	Peter W. James	7,108	14.69	–8.57
Marxist–Leninist	Dave Danielson	211	0.44	–
Total valid votes		48,379	99.59	
Total rejected ballots		197	0.41	–0.63
Turnout		48,576	74.77	–2.29
Eligible voters		64,965		
Progressive Conservative hold		Swing		+1.91
Source: Library of Parliament

1972 Canadian federal election: Victoria
Party	Candidate	Votes	%	±%
Progressive Conservative	Allan McKinnon	22,842	47.48	+15.09
Liberal	David Groos	12,264	25.49	–18.40
New Democratic	Flemming Hansen	11,192	23.26	+0.81
Social Credit	Clifford E. Stretch	1,173	2.44	–
Independent	Daniel Lewis Heffernan	357	0.74	–
Independent	Michael Charles Hall-Patch	280	0.58	–
Total valid votes		48,108	98.97	
Total rejected ballots		503	1.03	+0.30
Turnout		48,611	77.06	–2.16
Eligible voters		63,079		
Progressive Conservative gain from Liberal		Swing		+16.75
Source: Library of Parliament

1968 Canadian federal election: Victoria
Party	Candidate	Votes	%	±%
Liberal	David Groos	18,401	43.90	+12.03
Progressive Conservative	Eric Charman	13,578	32.39	+3.82
New Democratic	Harvey Richardson	9,414	22.46	+5.85
Independent	George Burnham	526	1.25	–
Total valid votes		41,919	99.27	
Total rejected ballots		310	0.73	–0.04
Turnout		42,229	79.22	–2.02
Eligible voters		53,303		
Liberal hold		Swing		+4.10
Source: Library of Parliament

1965 Canadian federal election: Victoria
Party	Candidate	Votes	%	±%
Liberal	David Groos	13,930	31.87	–2.74
Progressive Conservative	Clifford Waite	12,488	28.57	–2.50
Social Credit	M. Frank Hunter	9,659	22.10	+8.98
New Democratic	J. Lloyd Brereton	7,259	16.61	+3.36
Communist	William Stuart E. Morrison	374	0.86	–
Total valid votes		43,710	99.23	
Total rejected ballots		339	0.77	+0.06
Turnout		44,049	81.25	–1.15
Eligible voters		54,215		
Liberal hold		Swing		–2.62
Source: Library of Parliament

1963 Canadian federal election: Victoria
Party	Candidate	Votes	%	±%
Liberal	David Groos	15,040	34.61	–0.91
Progressive Conservative	Eric Charman	13,502	31.07	–4.99
New Democratic	Henry A.L. Fanthorpe	5,757	13.25	–0.64
Social Credit	Millard H. Mooney	5,701	13.12	–1.41
Independent Liberal	Thomas Foster Isherwood	3,460	7.96	–
Total valid votes		43,460	99.29	
Total rejected ballots		311	0.71	–0.23
Turnout		43,771	82.40	+4.69
Eligible voters		53,123		
Liberal gain from Progressive Conservative		Swing		+2.95
Independent Liberal candidate Thomas Foster Isherwood lost 27.56 percentage points from his 1962 performance as an official Liberal candidate.
Source: Library of Parliament

1962 Canadian federal election: Victoria
Party	Candidate	Votes	%	±%
Progressive Conservative	Albert McPhillips	14,333	36.06	–25.01
Liberal	Thomas Foster Isherwood	14,117	35.52	+14.20
Social Credit	James Audain	5,776	14.53	+8.08
New Democratic	Henry A.L. Fanthorpe	5,520	13.89	+2.72
Total valid votes		39,746	99.06	
Total rejected ballots		376	0.94	+0.22
Turnout		40,122	77.70	–1.00
Eligible voters		51,634		
Progressive Conservative hold		Swing		–19.61
Change for the New Democrats is based on the Co-operative Commonwealth votes in the previous election.
Source: Library of Parliament

1958 Canadian federal election: Victoria
Party	Candidate	Votes	%	±%
Progressive Conservative	Albert McPhillips	24,945	61.07	+16.40
Liberal	William Geoffrey Ellis	8,706	21.31	–5.98
Co-operative Commonwealth	Victor W. Williams	4,560	11.16	+1.92
Social Credit	Elmer D. McEwen	2,637	6.46	–12.35
Total valid votes		40,848	99.28	
Total rejected ballots		297	0.72	+0.28
Turnout		41,145	78.70	+0.03
Eligible voters		52,281		
Progressive Conservative hold		Swing		+11.20
Source: Library of Parliament

1957 Canadian federal election: Victoria
Party	Candidate	Votes	%	±%
Progressive Conservative	Albert McPhillips	17,981	44.66	+26.50
Liberal	Francis Fairey	10,987	27.29	–13.36
Social Credit	Waldo McTavish Skillings	7,569	18.80	–6.95
Co-operative Commonwealth	Victor W. Williams	3,721	9.24	–4.01
Total valid votes		40,258	99.56	
Total rejected ballots		178	0.44	–0.32
Turnout		40,436	78.67	+10.24
Eligible voters		51,401		
Progressive Conservative gain from Liberal		Swing		+19.93
Source: Library of Parliament

1953 Canadian federal election: Victoria
Party	Candidate	Votes	%	±%
Liberal	Francis Fairey	13,696	40.65	–15.32
Social Credit	Waldo McTavish Skillings	8,677	25.75	–
Progressive Conservative	James George	6,122	18.17	–11.24
Co-operative Commonwealth	May Campbell	4,465	13.25	–1.37
Independent Social Credit	Andrew Henry Jukes	422	1.25	–
Labor–Progressive	Thomas Seibert	313	0.93	–
Total valid votes		33,695	99.24	
Total rejected ballots		258	0.76	+0.09
Turnout		33,953	68.42	–5.13
Eligible voters		49,621		
Liberal hold		Swing		–20.54
Source: Library of Parliament

1949 Canadian federal election: Victoria
Party	Candidate	Votes	%	±%
Liberal	Robert Mayhew	19,324	55.97	+22.65
Progressive Conservative	Gordon Arthur Cameron	10,154	29.41	–2.89
Co-operative Commonwealth	William Baxter Caird	5,048	14.62	–14.44
Total valid votes		34,526	99.33	
Total rejected ballots		234	0.67	–0.26
Turnout		34,760	73.56	–8.09
Eligible voters		47,255		
Liberal hold		Swing		+12.77
Source: Library of Parliament

1945 Canadian federal election: Victoria
Party	Candidate	Votes	%	±%
Liberal	Robert Mayhew	11,806	33.32	–19.22
Progressive Conservative	Henry Lumley Drayton	11,442	32.30	–2.48
Co-operative Commonwealth	Murray D. Bryce	10,295	29.06	+16.38
Labor–Progressive	Garry Culhane	1,093	3.09	–
Social Credit	Millard Franklin Lougheed	793	2.24	–
Total valid votes		35,429	99.07	
Total rejected ballots		334	0.93	–0.25
Turnout		35,763	81.65	+6.00
Eligible voters		43,799		
Liberal hold		Swing		–8.34
Source: Library of Parliament

1940 Canadian federal election: Victoria
Party	Candidate	Votes	%	±%
Liberal	Robert Mayhew	13,887	52.54	+12.48
National Government	James Sutherland Brown	9,193	34.78	+2.48
Co-operative Commonwealth	Kenneth McAllister	3,352	12.68	–14.96
Total valid votes		26,432	98.81	
Total rejected ballots		318	1.19	+1.19
Turnout		26,750	75.65	–
Eligible voters		35,360		
Liberal hold		Swing		+5.00
Source: Library of Parliament

Canadian federal by-election, 29 November 1937: Victoria On the death of Simon Fraser Tolmie, 13 October 1937
Party	Candidate	Votes	%	±%
Liberal	Robert Mayhew	9,493	40.06	+7.55
Conservative	Bruce Alistair McKelvie	7,654	32.30	–1.76
Co-operative Commonwealth	J. King Gordon	6,550	27.64	–5.79
Total valid votes		23,697	100.00	
Total rejected ballots		–		
Turnout		23,697	–	–
Eligible voters				
Liberal gain from Conservative		Swing		+4.66
Source: Library of Parliament

Canadian federal by-election, 8 June 1936: Victoria On the death of D'Arcy Plunkett, 3 May 1936
Party	Candidate	Votes	%	±%
Conservative	Simon Fraser Tolmie	5,997	34.06	–1.23
Co-operative Commonwealth	J. King Gordon	5,887	33.43	+2.96
Independent	Christopher John McDowell	5,725	32.51	+2.53
Total valid votes		17,609	100.00	
Total rejected ballots		–		
Turnout		17,609	–	–
Eligible voters				
Conservative hold		Swing		–2.10
Independent candidate Christopher John McDowell gained 2.51 percentage points from his 1935 performance as a Liberal.
Source: Library of Parliament

1935 Canadian federal election: Victoria
Party	Candidate	Votes	%	±%
Conservative	D'Arcy Plunkett	7,505	35.28	–21.61
Co-operative Commonwealth	J. King Gordon	6,482	30.47	–
Liberal	Christopher John McDowell	6,378	29.99	–13.12
Reconstruction	Percy E. George	905	4.25	–
Total valid votes		21,270	98.54	
Total rejected ballots		315	1.46	+1.46
Turnout		21,585	74.68	+8.67
Eligible voters		28,902		
Conservative hold		Swing		–26.04
Source: Library of Parliament

1930 Canadian federal election: Victoria
Party	Candidate	Votes	%	±%
Conservative	D'Arcy Plunkett	8,319	56.89	+6.48
Liberal	Stuart Alexander Henderson	6,303	43.11	–6.48
Total valid votes		14,622	100.00	
Total rejected ballots		–		
Turnout		14,622	66.01	–
Eligible voters		22,151		
Conservative hold		Swing		+6.48
Source: Library of Parliament

Canadian federal by-election, 6 December 1928: Victoria On the resignation of Simon Fraser Tolmie, 5 June 1928
Party	Candidate	Votes	%	±%
Conservative	D'Arcy Plunkett	5,636	50.41	–12.36
Liberal	John Duncan MacLean	5,544	49.59	+12.36
Total valid votes		11,180	100.00	
Total rejected ballots		–		
Turnout		11,180	–	–
Eligible voters				
Conservative hold		Swing		–12.36
Source: Library of Parliament

1926 Canadian federal election: Victoria
Party	Candidate	Votes	%	±%
Conservative	Simon Fraser Tolmie	6,831	62.77	+2.77
Liberal	Edward Oliver Carew Martin	4,051	37.23	–2.77
Total valid votes		10,882	100.00	
Total rejected ballots		–		
Turnout		10,882	65.03	–6.48
Eligible voters		16,734		
Conservative hold		Swing		+2.77
Source: Library of Parliament

1925 Canadian federal election: Victoria
Party	Candidate	Votes	%
Conservative	Simon Fraser Tolmie	6,926	60.00
Liberal	William McKinnon Ivel	4,617	40.00
Total valid votes		11,543	100.00
Total rejected ballots		–	
Turnout		11,543	71.51
Eligible voters		16,142	
This riding was created from Victoria City, where Conservative Simon Fraser Tolmie was the incumbent.
Source: Library of Parliament

=== 1872–1902 ===
The Victoria riding was abolished in 1903. Successor ridings were Victoria City and, for western parts of the riding, Nanaimo. This riding elected two members to parliament.

Canadian federal by-election, 28 January 1902: Victoria, British Columbia On election being declared void, 2 December 1901
Party	Candidate	Votes	%	Elected
Liberal	George Riley	1,797	56.60	✓
Conservative	F.S. Barnard	1,378	43.40	
Total valid votes		3,175		

1900 Canadian federal election: Victoria, British Columbia
Party	Candidate	Votes	Elected
Conservative	Edward Gawler Prior	1,872	✓
Conservative	Thomas Earle	1,775	✓
Liberal	Richard Low Drury	1,657	
Liberal	George Riley	1,640	

1896 Canadian federal election: Victoria, British Columbia
Party	Candidate	Votes	Elected
Conservative	E.G. Prior	1,647	✓
Conservative	Thomas Earle	1,551	✓
Liberal	William Templeman	1,452	
Liberal	George L. Milne	1,355	

Canadian federal by-election, 6 January 1896: Victoria, British Columbia On the resignation of Edward Gawler Prior
Party	Candidate	Votes	Elected
Conservative	Edward Gawler Prior	unknown	✓
Liberal	William Templeman	unknown	
On the appointment of Edward Gawler Prior as Controller of Inland Revenue, 17 December 1895.
There are no vote counts in the Elections Canada records, only an indication that Mr. Prior was the winner of this by-election.

1891 Canadian federal election: Victoria, British Columbia
Party	Candidate	Votes	Elected
Conservative	Thomas Earle	1,061	✓
Conservative	E.G. Prior	1,031	✓
Liberal	William Templeman	449	
Liberal	William Marchant	417	

Canadian federal by-election, 23 January 1888: Victoria, British Columbia On the resignation of Noah Shakespeare
Party	Candidate	Votes	Elected
Conservative	Edward Gawler Prior	acclaimed	✓
On the resignation of Noah Shakespeare to accept the position of Postmaster of Victoria, June 1887.

Canadian federal by-election, 28 October 1889: Victoria, British Columbia On the resignation of Edgar Crow Baker, 2 May 1889
Party	Candidate	Votes	Elected
Conservative	Thomas Earle	acclaimed	✓

1887 Canadian federal election: Victoria, British Columbia
Party	Candidate	Votes	Elected
Conservative	E.C. Baker	632	✓
Conservative	Noah Shakespeare	548	✓
Independent Conservative	T.B. Humphreys	394	
Independent Conservative	James Fell	327	
Liberal	W.A. Robertson	253	
Liberal	A.E. McCallum	245	

1882 Canadian federal election: Victoria, British Columbia
Party	Candidate	Votes	Elected
Conservative	Edgar Crow Baker	441	✓
Conservative	Noah Shakespeare	400	✓
Liberal	Amor De Cosmos	307	
Unknown	Cornelius Booth	241	
Unknown	John Boyd	149	
Unknown	James Fell	139	

1878 Canadian federal election: Victoria, British Columbia
Party	Candidate	Votes	Elected
Liberal–Conservative	John A. Macdonald	896	✓
Liberal	Amor De Cosmos (incumbent)	538	✓
Unknown	J.P. Davies	480	
Source(s) Library of Parliament – History of Federal Ridings since 1867: Victoria

1874 Canadian federal election: Victoria, British Columbia
Party	Candidate	Votes	Elected
Liberal	Amor De Cosmos	308	✓
Independent Liberal	Francis J. Roscoe	304	✓
Unknown	C. Morton	299	
Unknown	T. Harris	97	
Source: lop.parl.ca

1872 Canadian federal election: Victoria (British Columbia)
Party	Candidate	Votes	Elected
Liberal	Henry Nathan Jr.	402	✓
Liberal	Amor De Cosmos	398	✓
Unknown	R. Beaven	94	
This riding was created from Victoria District, which elected both Liberal Amor De Cosmos and Henry Nathan Jr. in the previous by-election.
Source: Canadian Elections Database

== See also ==
- List of Canadian electoral districts
- Historical federal electoral districts of Canada
