= Amor De Cosmos =

Canadian politician (1825-1897)

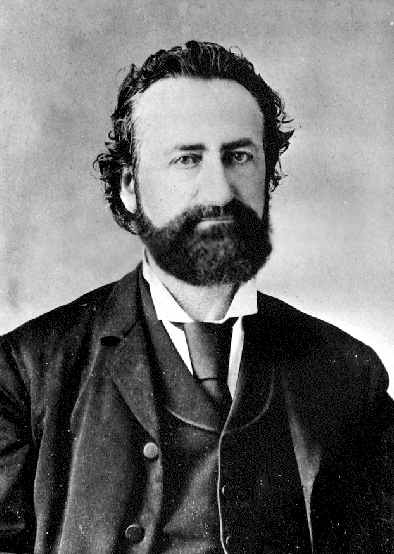
- Hon. Amor De Cosmos

2nd Premier of British Columbia
- In office December 23, 1872 – February 9, 1874 Serving with Henry Nathan Jr.
- Monarch: Victoria
- Lieutenant Governor: Joseph Trutch
- Preceded by: John Foster McCreight
- Succeeded by: George Anthony Walkem

Member of the Legislative Assembly for Victoria District
- In office October 16, 1871 – February 9, 1874 Serving with Arthur Bunster
- Preceded by: first member
- Succeeded by: William Archibald Robertson

Member of Parliament for Victoria
- In office October 12, 1872 – June 20, 1882 Serving with Henry Nathan, Jr., Francis James Roscoe, John A. Macdonald
- Preceded by: riding established
- Succeeded by: Edgar Crow Baker

Member of Parliament for Victoria District
- In office September 20, 1871 – October 12, 1872
- Preceded by: new member
- Succeeded by: riding abolished

Personal details
- Born: William Alexander Smith; August 20, 1825 Windsor, Nova Scotia
- Died: July 4, 1897 (aged 71) Victoria, British Columbia
- Party: Liberal Party of Canada until 1882
- Children: 1 daughter (disputed)

Amor De Cosmos (born William Alexander Smith; August 20, 1825 – July 4, 1897) was a Canadian journalist, publisher and politician. He served as the second premier of British Columbia.

== Early life ==
Amor De Cosmos was born William Alexander Smith in Windsor, Nova Scotia, to United Empire Loyalist parents. His education included a stint at King's College in Windsor, following which, around 1840, he became a mercantile clerk in Halifax, Nova Scotia. There he joined the Dalhousie University debating club and came under the influence of the Nova Scotia politician and reformer, Joseph Howe. In 1845, at the age of 20 he joined the Church of Jesus Christ of Latter-day Saints. In 1852, he left for New York on a steam ship stopping first in Boston. He settled in Kanesville, Iowa (today known as Council Bluffs), for two months where he established a daguerreotype gallery. But the following year the lure of the California Gold Rush beckoned, and Smith continued west, heading overland to Placerville, California. Here he set up a new studio and prospered taking pictures of the miners and their operations. Joined by his brother, the pair moved northwest to Oroville, California, where they engaged in various unspecified entrepreneurial ventures. In 1854, Smith successfully petitioned the California State Assembly to have his name changed to "Amor De Cosmos", which he incorrectly translated (possibly from Latin) as "Lover of the Cosmos". In Portuguese and Spanish, the name directly translates to Cosmos' Love, however it is unlikely his intention was to adopt a Spanish/Portuguese name, given the general sentiment among English speakers toward the Spanish-speaking and Portuguese-speaking world at the time. The name paid tribute, De Cosmos said, "to what I love most ... Love of order, beauty, the world, the universe."

== Reformer and journalist ==
In 1858, De Cosmos and his brother moved on again, this time heading north to British North America as they wished to live under the British flag once again. They also sensed an opportunity in the booming city of Victoria, capital of the Colony of Vancouver Island. The city, since 1843 a quiet village of about 300 until the spring of that year, was just entering an economic boom as it became a jumping-off point for miners headed to the New Caledonia (now mainland British Columbia) to participate in the Fraser Canyon Gold Rush. De Cosmos founded a newspaper, The Daily British Colonist, which survives today in its current incarnation as the Victoria Times-Colonist.

De Cosmos was the editor of the Colonist through 1863, and quickly established himself as an opponent of the administration of Sir James Douglas, governor of the colony and the former Chief Factor of the Hudson's Bay Company for Vancouver Island. De Cosmos decried the "family-company compact" of Hudson's Bay men and Douglas associates who controlled the political and social affairs of the colony, even after Douglas's retirement in 1864.

De Cosmos was a liberal reformer cast in the mold of John Locke and John Stuart Mill. He argued passionately for unrestricted free enterprise, public education, an end to economic and political privileges, and — above all — the institution of responsible government through an elected assembly. However, true to the Victorian spirit of the age, De Cosmos was also a proponent of social progress through economic and population growth. He was a tireless advocate for economic diversification, being one of the first British Columbians to argue for a policy of encouraging development of the "three F's" — farming, forestry, and fisheries — that would underpin the region's economy for the next century.

== Political career ==
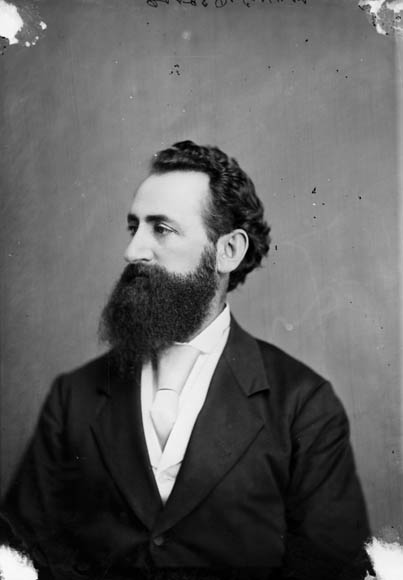
Amor De Cosmos, September 1874

As the child of American refugees and having lived six years in the United States, De Cosmos developed a sharpened sense of nationalism. This was expressed in a growing protectionist economic sentiment, and the belief that the colonies of British North America needed to be self-supporting, develop a distinct identity, and form a political and economic union. From such policies, emerged the two great causes of his later career: the union of Vancouver Island and British Columbia, and the merged Colony of British Columbia's entry into the Canadian Confederation. To advance the first cause, De Cosmos left journalism and entered politics, becoming a member of the Legislative Assembly of Vancouver Island from 1863 until its union with the Colony of British Columbia in 1866. He advanced the second cause through his position as a member of the assembly of the merged, larger British Columbia from 1867 to 1868 and 1870 to 1871, and as the leading force (with Robert Beaven and John Robson) behind the colony's Confederation League. Through the instrumental role De Cosmos played in realizing these two goals, he earned for himself his reputation as British Columbia's Father of Confederation.

At the time of British Columbia's entry into Confederation on July 20, 1871, De Cosmos was the leading pro-Confederation figure in the new province. That year, he was elected to represent Victoria in both the provincial legislature and the House of Commons. Despite his prominence — or perhaps because of it — Lieutenant Governor Sir Joseph Trutch passed over De Cosmos for the job of Premier, instead asking John Foster McCreight to assume the position.

=== Premier of British Columbia ===
McCreight resigned in 1872 on a motion of non-confidence, and on December 23, 1872, Trutch asked De Cosmos to form a new government as Premier. De Cosmos populated his cabinet with reformers, mostly born in North America, many of whom would come to dominate provincial politics for the generation. His government pursued an agenda of political reform, economic expansion, and the development of public institutions—especially schools.

De Cosmos was a member of a group of entrepreneurs that saw an opportunity for a steel industry in B.C. using the newly discovered iron deposits on Texada Island, coal from Vancouver Island with a smelter and rolling mill in Vancouver. Rails for the transcontinental railway proposed western construction starting in Vancouver to meet the push from the east would provide the immediate market for the product. Involving himself in this venture in his position as Premier was considered a conflict of interest and precipitated the Texada Scandal and the second B.C. Royal Commission of Inquiry. He resigned as Premier. The Commission however found him not guilty.

=== Member of Parliament ===
Despite having resigned as Premier, De Cosmos continued to be re-elected as a Liberal Member of Parliament for Victoria City. Consistent with federal promises to place the terminus of the transcontinental railway in Victoria, De Cosmos, in Ottawa, pushed for completion, especially of the Vancouver Island portion. De Cosmos also became an opponent of land concessions to First Nations in the province, seeing it as a hindrance to British Columbia's economic growth and settlement by those of European descent. It is generally conceded that De Cosmos's tenure as a member of the dominion parliament was undistinguished.

== Retirement and death ==
De Cosmos lost the 1882 federal election and retired to Victoria. Although widely regarded as a stirring orator, a master debater, and a man of great intellectual depth, De Cosmos had always been considered eccentric. Contemporaries paint a portrait of an isolated person (he never married and had few intimate friends; some claimed he had a daughter from a friend) with grandiose manners, prone to public outbursts of tears, and a fierce temper that sometimes degenerated into fist-fights. He had unusual phobias — including a fear of electricity. As he grew older, his eccentricities intensified; he became increasingly incoherent.

=== Declared insane ===
By 1895 he was declared insane. One of his more notable eccentricities was the founding of a hot food delivery company to prospectors in the Klondike Gold Fields. The difficult logistics of this service scared away investors and ultimately proved its downfall. He died on July 4, 1897, in Victoria at the age of 71.

== Election results ==
Canadian federal by-election, 20 September 1871: Victoria District
Party	Candidate	Votes
Liberal	Amor De Cosmos	acclaimed
Liberal	Henry Nathan Jr.	acclaimed
Source: lop.parl.ca

1871 British Columbia general election: Victoria
Party	Candidate	Votes	%	Elected
Independent	Amor De Cosmos	151	40.05%	✓
Independent	Arthur Bunster	123	32.63%	✓
Independent	William Dalby	103	27.32%	
Total valid votes		377		

1872 Canadian federal election: Victoria
Party	Candidate	Votes	%	Elected
Liberal	Henry Nathan Jr.	402	44.97	✓
Liberal	Amor De Cosmos	398	44.52	✓
Unknown	Robert Beaven	94	10.51	
Total valid votes		894	100.00	
Total rejected ballots		–		
Turnout		894	96.65	
Eligible voters		925		
This riding was created from Victoria District, which elected both Liberal Amor De Cosmos and Henry Nathan Jr. in the previous by-election.
Source: Library of Parliament

1874 Canadian federal election: Victoria
Party	Candidate	Votes	%	Elected
Liberal	Amor De Cosmos	308	30.56	✓
Independent Liberal	Francis James Roscoe	304	30.16	✓
Unknown	C. Morton	299	29.66	
Unknown	T. Harris	97	9.62	
Total valid votes		1,008	100.00	
Total rejected ballots		–		
Turnout		1,008		
Eligible voters		959		
Source: Library of Parliament

1878 Canadian federal election: Victoria
Party	Candidate	Votes	%	Elected
Liberal–Conservative	John A. Macdonald	896	46.81	✓
Liberal	Amor De Cosmos	538	28.11	✓
Unknown	J.P. Davies	480	25.08	
Total valid votes		1,914	100.00	
Total rejected ballots		–		
Turnout		1,914		
Eligible voters		1,294		
Source: Library of Parliament

1882 Canadian federal election: Victoria
Party	Candidate	Votes	%	Elected
Conservative	Edgar Crow Baker	441	26.30	✓
Conservative	Noah Shakespeare	400	23.85	✓
Liberal	Amor De Cosmos	307	18.31	
Unknown	Cornelius Booth	241	14.37	
Unknown	John Boyd	149	8.88	
Unknown	James Fell	139	8.29	
Total valid votes		1,677	100.00	
Total rejected ballots		–		
Turnout		1,677		
Eligible voters		1,211		
Source: Library of Parliament

Parliament of Canada
Preceded by none	Member of Parliament for Victoria District; 1871–1872	Succeeded by abolished
Preceded by none	Member of Parliament for Victoria; 1872–1882	Succeeded by Edgar Crow Baker and Noah Shakespeare
