= Edgar Crow Baker =

Canadian politician (1845–1920)

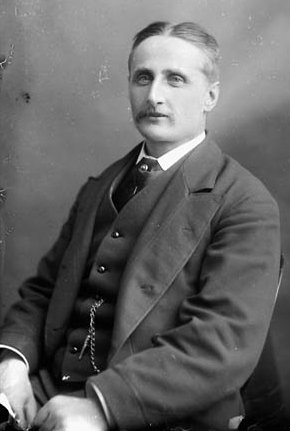

Member of the Canadian Parliament for Victoria
- In office 1882–1889 Serving with Noah Shakespeare (1882-1887); Edward Gawler Prior (1888-1889)
- Preceded by: John A. Macdonald; Amor De Cosmos
- Succeeded by: Thomas Earle

Personal details
- Born: September 16, 1845 Lambeth, Surrey, England
- Died: November 3, 1920 (aged 75) Victoria, British Columbia
- Party: Conservative

Edgar Crow Baker (September 16, 1845 – November 3, 1920) was a Canadian politician from British Columbia.

Baker was born in Lambeth, then part of Surrey, England, the son of Edward William Whitley Baker, and was educated at the Royal Hospital School in Greenwich. In 1860, he entered the Royal Navy, serving as a navigating lieutenant and retiring at the rank of major in 1878. In 1869, he married Frances Mary Jones. He settled in Victoria, British Columbia and became a prominent accountant, real estate conveyancer and notary. Baker, often known as Crow Baker professionally, prospered and became one of the wealthiest men in the city. Baker served as the Grandmaster of the Masonic Grand Lodge of British Columbia. He entered civic politics as an alderman in Victoria. Baker switched to federal politics when Prime Minister John A. Macdonald vacated his seat in the Victoria district to return to an Ontario seat. He was elected to parliament as a Conservative, along with colleague Noah Shakespeare in the 1882 federal election. Baker was re-elected in 1887 but would later resign his seat, in 1889.

He died at his home in Victoria on November 3, 1920.
