= John Brewin =

Canadian politician

John F. Brewin
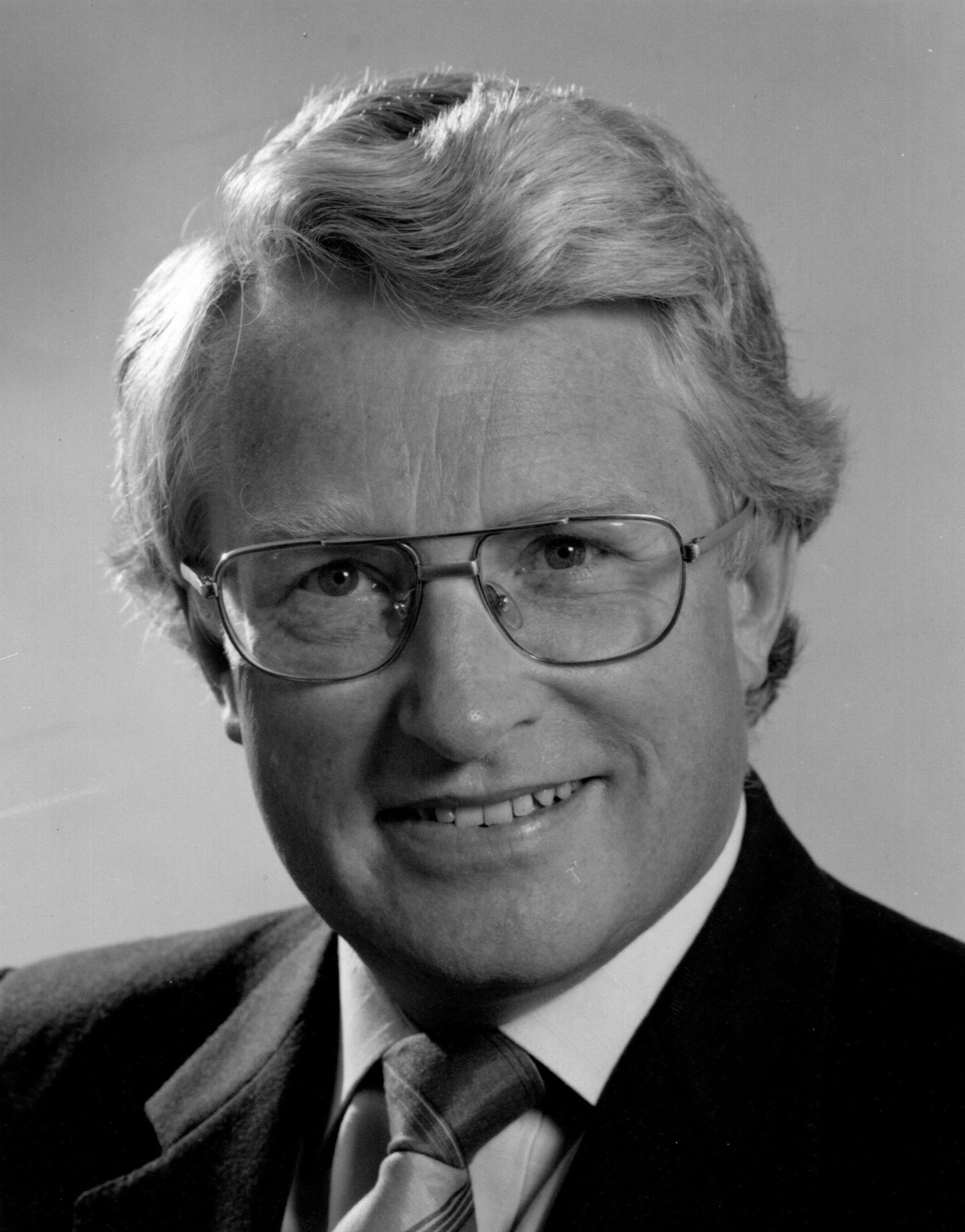

Member of Parliament for Victoria
- In office December 12, 1988 – September 8, 1993
- Preceded by: Allan McKinnon
- Succeeded by: David Anderson

Personal details
- Born: September 14, 1936 (age 89) Toronto, Ontario, Canada
- Party: New Democratic Party
- Spouses: Gretchen Brewin; Patricia Thompson (m. 1997)
- Profession: Journalist; lawyer

John F. Brewin (born September 14, 1936) is a Canadian politician, who served as Member of Parliament for Victoria from 1988 to 1993. He is a member of the New Democratic Party, as was his father Andrew Brewin. He was married to Gretchen Brewin, who served concurrently as mayor of the city of Victoria. He married Patricia Thompson in 1997.

== Career ==
Brewin first ran for federal office in 1984 against veteran PC incumbent Allan McKinnon. He came in second in that election, losing by 4,108 or 8 per cent. McKinnon did not run again in the 1988 election, and Brewin won the riding easily over PC candidate Geoff Young. In 1993, he lost his attempt at re-election to Liberal David Anderson. He came in third, also behind the Reform Party candidate.

In 2002, he attracted attention in the media and the party when he correctly predicted that NDP leader Alexa McDonough would step down that year. He also correctly predicted the strength of the then-potential Jack Layton candidacy for the leadership.

Brewin now practises law for the Toronto firm of Ryder Wright Blair and Holmes. With Derek Fudge, he co-authored Free Collective Bargaining: Human Right or Canadian Illusion, published in 2005 by the National Union of Public and General Employees and the United Food and Chemical Workers Union. The study reviewed more than 20 years' erosion of bargaining rights in Canada. He was on the board of the Toronto Community Housing Corporation and is currently a member of the General Synod of the Anglican Church of Canada. He lives in Toronto.
