= Albert McPhillips =

Canadian politician (1904–1971)

Albert DeBurgo McPhillips
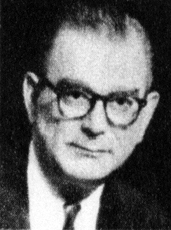

Member of Parliament for Victoria
- In office June 1957 – February 1963
- Preceded by: Francis Fairey
- Succeeded by: David Groos

Personal details
- Born: 18 January 1904 Victoria, British Columbia, Canada
- Died: 11 March 1971 (aged 67) Ottawa, Ontario, Canada
- Party: Progressive Conservative
- Spouse(s): Dorothy M. Freethy(1909-2005) (m. 30 January 1935-1971, his death)
- Relations: Albert Edward McPhillips, Alexander St.George McPhillips (brother); Gwyneth Marie Kathleen Hall(sister); Davie Fulton(cousin)
- Children: Jacqueline Marie Abbott & Lewis Edward McPhillips
- Profession: Barrister and solicitor
- Nickname: Burke

Albert DeBurgo "Burke" McPhillips (18 January 1904 – 11 March 1971) was a Canadian politician. McPhillips was a Progressive Conservative party member of the House of Commons of Canada. He was a barrister and solicitor by career.

== Early years ==
McPhillips was born in Victoria, British Columbia. He was the youngest son of the Hon. Mr. Justice Albert Edward McPhillips and Sophia Emily Davie, daughter of the late Hon. A.E.B. Davie, Q.C.

== Military service ==
McPhillips served in the Canadian Army as Captain with The Duke of Connaught's Own Rifles of Canada from 1940 to 1946.

== Political career ==
McPhillips was a candidate for the British Columbia Conservative Party in the Vancouver Centre (1933, 1941 provincial elections) and Victoria City (1952).

He was first elected at the Victoria riding in the 1957 general election and was re-elected twice, in the 1958 and 1962 federal elections. McPhillips served as Parliamentary Secretary to the Minister of Fisheries from August 1962 to February 1963. His cousin, Davie Fulton, was Minister of Public Works around this time.

After completing his third term, the 25th Canadian Parliament, McPhillips left federal political office and was appointed to the Tariff Board of Canada.

He died suddenly at Ottawa on 11 March 1971. He was survived by his wife and two children.
