= Denise Savoie =

Canadian politician

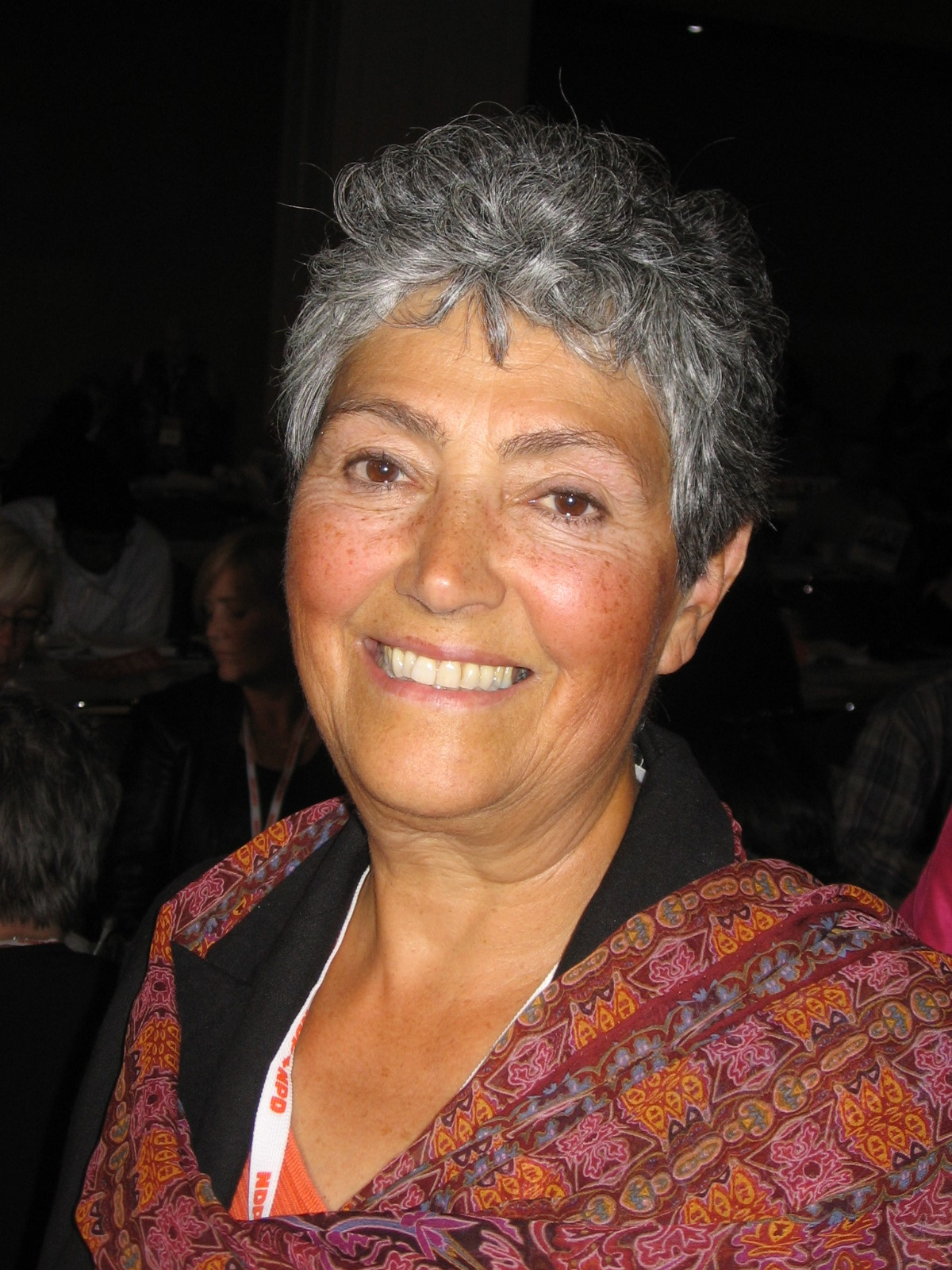
- Savoie in 2006

Deputy Speaker of the House of Commons Chairman of Committees of the Whole
- In office June 2, 2011 – September 17, 2012
- Monarch: Elizabeth II
- Governor General: David Johnston
- Prime Minister: Stephen Harper
- Speaker: Andrew Scheer
- Preceded by: Andrew Scheer
- Succeeded by: Joe Comartin

Member of Parliament for Victoria
- In office January 23, 2006 – August 31, 2012
- Preceded by: David Anderson
- Succeeded by: Murray Rankin

Personal details
- Born: November 21, 1943 (age 82) Saint Boniface, Manitoba, Canada
- Party: New Democratic
- Profession: Teacher

Denise Savoie (/sæˈvwɑː/ sav-WAH; born November 21, 1943) is a Canadian politician, who served as the federal Member of Parliament for Victoria from 2006 until 2012 representing the New Democratic Party. She was elected to the House of Commons of Canada in the 2006 federal election as a candidate of the New Democratic Party. She resigned from parliament effective August 31, 2012 citing health reasons.

== Entrance to federal politics ==
The riding of Victoria had been Liberal since 1993, previously represented by high-profile Liberal MP David Anderson. Savoie defeated former mayor David Turner and former city councillor Laura Acton for the NDP nomination.

Savoie was the NDP's Intergovernmental Affairs Critic, Post-Secondary Education Critic, Literacy Critic and Human Resources Deputy Critic (for Training).

In November 2008, she was named Deputy Chair of Committees of the Whole, the second of three chair occupants who assist the Speaker of the House of Commons of Canada. In June 2011, she was named Deputy Speaker and Chair of Committees of the Whole.

Savoie supported a 2009 proposal that the federal NDP change its name to the 'Democratic Party of Canada'.

She was re-elected in the May 2, 2011 federal election with a majority of the votes. She ran against Liberal candidate and former Mayor of Oak Bay, Christopher Causton and Conservative candidate Patrick Hunt. Hunt ran previously in Victoria as a Reform candidate in the 1993 federal election.

On August 23, 2012, Savoie announced she was resigning her seat in the House of Commons for health reasons. "After 6 years in the House of Commons and nearly 13 years as an elected official, I have decided to return to private life," Savoie said in a written statement. "My doctor gave me a health warning this spring and recommended that I adopt a more balanced lifestyle, without the travel and physical demands of the job of an MP from Western Canada. I am therefore resigning as the Member of Parliament for Victoria."

Parliament of Canada
Preceded by Andrew Scheer	Deputy Speaker and Chair of Committees of the Whole of the House of Commons; 2011–2012	Succeeded by Joe Comartin
