= David Groos =

Canadian politician

David Walter Groos
- Official 1968 portrait

Member of Parliament for Victoria
- In office April 1963 – September 1972
- Preceded by: Albert McPhillips
- Succeeded by: Allan McKinnon

Personal details
- Born: 20 April 1918 Milwaukee, Wisconsin, United States
- Died: 12 January 1976 (aged 57)
- Party: Liberal
- Profession: naval officer

David Walter Groos (20 April 1918 – 12 January 1976) was a Liberal party member of the House of Commons of Canada.

== Biography ==
He was born in Milwaukee, Wisconsin, United States and became a naval officer by career.

He was first elected at the Victoria riding in the 1963 general election, after previous defeats at the Esquimalt—Saanich riding in the 1962 election and in a 29 May 1961 by-election.

Groos was re-elected at Victoria in the 1965 and 1968 elections. After finishing his term in the 28th Canadian Parliament, he was defeated by Allan McKinnon of the Progressive Conservative party in the 1972 federal election.

In 1964, Groos purchased what is today maintained as Emily Carr House. The Emily Carr Foundation was formed in 1967 to preserve the building.
