= Allan McKinnon =

Canadian politician (1917–1990)

The Honourable Allan McKinnon PC MC CD

Minister of National Defence
- In office 4 June 1979 – 2 March 1980
- Prime Minister: Joe Clark
- Preceded by: Barney Danson
- Succeeded by: Gilles Lamontagne

Minister of Veterans Affairs
- In office 4 June 1979 – 2 March 1980
- Prime Minister: Joe Clark
- Preceded by: Daniel J. MacDonald
- Succeeded by: Daniel J. MacDonald

Member of Parliament for Victoria
- In office 30 October 1972 – 20 November 1988
- Preceded by: David Groos
- Succeeded by: John Brewin

Personal details
- Born: Allan Bruce McKinnon; 11 January 1917 Canora, Saskatchewan, Canada
- Died: 19 September 1990 (aged 73) Victoria, British Columbia, Canada
- Party: Progressive Conservative
- Profession: Teacher

Military service
- Branch/service: Canadian Army
- Years of service: 1939-1945
- Rank: Major

Allan Bruce McKinnon PC MC CD (11 January 1917 – 19 September 1990) was a Canadian politician.

== Biography ==
Born in Canora, Saskatchewan, he served with the Royal Canadian Artillery and was officer with the Princess Patricia's Canadian Light Infantry. In 1945, he was awarded the Military Cross. After the war, he remained in the Canadian Army. He retired with the rank of major in 1965 and settled in Victoria, British Columbia. He then taught at Sangster Elementary School in Colwood. From 1968 to 1972, he was a trustee and later chairman of the Victoria School Board.

McKinnon was first elected to the House of Commons of Canada in the 1972 federal election as the Progressive Conservative Member of Parliament for Victoria, British Columbia. He was re-elected on four successive occasions, and served from 1979 to 1980 as Minister of National Defence and Minister of Veterans Affairs in the short-lived minority government of Joe Clark.

McKinnon retired from politics at the 1988 federal election. He died at Royal Jubilee Hospital in Victoria, British Columbia in 1990 due to cancer.
