= LeBel Royal Commission =

1945 inquiry into Ontario premier

The LeBel Royal Commission was an Ontario Royal Commission set up on 28 May 1945 to look into charges made against the province's premier George A. Drew that he was operating a secret political police. The charges came from Ontario's Official Opposition Leader Edward Bigelow (Ted) Jolliffe, during the 1945 Ontario general election campaign. He made these allegations during a campaign radio speech on 24 May 1945. Drew announced in a radio speech on 26 May that he would call an inquiry, and appointed Mr. Justice A. M. LeBel to lead the commission on 28 May. Jolliffe, and Liberal leader Mitchell Hepburn made offers to withhold from electioneering and have the commission report before the election. Drew refused to either postpone the election, or speed up the commission process. The commission began hearings on 20 June 1945, and heard final arguments on 20 July 1945. The report was issued on 11 October 1945, with LeBel agreeing with much of what Jolliffe charged, but ultimately ruled that the Premier did not have a secret political police reporting to him, mainly due to the lack of direct documented evidence. In the late 1970s, that documented evidence was found, but the provincial government at the time considered the case closed.

== Background ==
During the spring 1945 Ontario election, Premier George Drew ran an anti-Semitic, union bashing, Red-baiting campaign against the Co-operative Commonwealth Federation's Ontario section (CCF). The previous two-years of anti-socialist attacks by the Conservatives and their supporters, like Gladstone Murray and Montague A. Sanderson, were devastatingly effective against the previously popular CCF. Much of the source material for the anti-CCF campaign came from the Ontario Provincial Police (OPP)'s Special Investigation Branch's agent D-208: Captain William J. Osbourne-Dempster. His office was supposed to be investigating war-time 5th column saboteurs. Instead, starting in November 1943, he was investigating, almost exclusively, Ontario opposition MPPs, mainly focusing on the CCF caucus. The fact that Jolliffe knew about these 'secret' investigations as early as February 1944 led to one of the most infamous incidents in 20th-century Canadian politics.

As can be discerned from the previous description, the 1945 campaign was anything but genteel and polite. Jolliffe replied by giving a radio speech (written with the assistance of Lister Sinclair) that accused Drew of running a political Gestapo in Ontario. In the speech excerpt below, Jolliffe alleged that a secret department of the Ontario Provincial Police was acting as a political police – spying on the opposition and the media.

It is my duty to tell you that Colonel Drew is maintaining in Ontario, at this very minute, a secret political police, a paid government spy organization, a Gestapo to try and keep himself in power. And Col[onel] Drew maintains his secret political police at the expense of the taxpayers of Ontario – paid out of the Public Funds....

== Commission hearings ==
Jolliffe's inflammatory speech became the main issue of the campaign, and dominated coverage in the media for the rest of the election. Drew, and his Attorney-General Leslie Blackwell vehemently denied Jolliffe's accusations, but the public outcry was too much for them to abate. On 26 May 1945 during his own radio speech, Drew announced that he would be appointing a Royal Commission to investigate these charges. Jolliffe's CCF and Mitchell Hepburn's Ontario Liberal party wanted the election suspended until the Commission tabled its report, with Hepburn going as far as sending Drew a personal telegram stating he would stop campaigning if the commission were held immediately. Drew ignored these requests and continued to hold the election on its original date, despite it being many months before the Commission's findings would be made available.

Jolliffe's CCF went from 34 seats to 8, and he even lost his own seat in York South Drew, with his attack campaign, successfully drove the voter turn-out up, thereby driving the CCF's percentage and seat totals down.

Drew appointed Justice A.M. LeBel as the Royal Commissioner on 28 May 1945. His terms of reference were restricted to the question of whether Drew was personally responsible for the establishment of "a secret political police organization, for the purpose of collecting, by secret spying, material to be used in attempt to keep him in power. Wider questions like why the OPP, Ontario Civil Servants, were keeping files on MPPs were not allowed.

The hearings began on 20 June 1945, at Toronto's City Hall's third-floor courtroom. Jolliffe would act as his own counsel throughout the commission, but was assisted by fellow CCF lawyer, Andrew Brewin. The crown prosecutor was Joseph Sedgwick.

Over the next month, both Jolliffe and Brewin were able to establish, from several eyewitnesses, that agent D-208, Dempster, was spying on the CCF. What they could not prove, because they did not have access to the information in 1945, that Drew was directly in written correspondence with his supporter M.A. (Bugsy) Sanderson suggesting that he would finance any lawsuits or other charges stemming from the information provided by Dempster in his advertisements. Sanderson was, in late 1943 to 1945, along with Gladstone Murray, leading the libelous advertisement campaigns against the CCF in newspapers and bill-boards, with information gleaned from Dempster's briefings. Jolliffe presented several witnesses that claimed to have seen these documents. But Jolliffe could not produce the actual letter, and Drew would deny ever writing it. Justice LeBel heard final arguments on 20 July and began writing his report.

== Commission report ==
On 11 October 1945 Justice LeBel issued his report that essentially exonerated Drew and Blackwell. Due to Jolliffe presenting only circumstantial evidence that linked Drew to Dempster, Murray and Sanderson, the Commissioner found the information unconvincing, even though LeBel believed Dempster's interaction with Sanderson and Murray was inappropriate.

== Aftermath ==
Jolliffe's motives regarding his accusations, as well as his choice of words, would be questioned for many years afterwards. That would change. In the late 1970s, when David Lewis was doing research for his Memoirs he came across archival evidence proving the charge. Due to Lewis's discovery, Drew's son Edward, placed extremely restrictive conditions on his father's papers housed in the Public Archives of Canada that continue as of 2013.

As Lewis pointed out in his memoirs, "We found that Premier Drew and Gladstone Murray did not disclose all information to the Lebel Commission; indeed, they deliberately prevaricated throughout. The head of the Government of Ontario had given false witness under testimony.... The perpetrator of Ontario's Watergate got away with it." Former Ontario CCF and Ontario NDP leader, Donald C. MacDonald attempted to get the report reopened when the new evidence became public in 1981. He was still a member of the Ontario Legislature, and asked the Attorney General Roy McMurtry to reopen the Commission on 2 December 1981. McMurty refused to reopen the case, because almost everyone involved was dead and the commission already made its ruling in 1945.
