= Victoria District =

British Columbia electoral district

Defunct federal electoral district
- Legislature: House of Commons
- District created: 1871
- District abolished: 1872
- First contested: 1871
- Last contested: 1871

Victoria District was a federal electoral district in British Columbia, Canada, that was represented in the House of Commons of Canada from 1871 to 1872.

== History ==
It was created at the time of that province's entry into Confederation in 1871. It was composed of all of the Victoria, Esquimalt and Saanich districts as defined at the time. In 1872, it was abolished, and replaced by Victoria riding. As there was no general federal election including the new BC seats until 1872, the original Members of Parliament (MPs) from BC were elected in a special byelection held on 20 September 1871.

== Members of Parliament ==
In Victoria District, there were only two candidates for the two-seat riding, so both members entered the House of Commons by acclamation.

One was Premier Amor De Cosmos, who held the seat and its successor for three elected terms as of the 1872 general election. During his first term, he retained his office as Premier, and during the last, shared the seat with Prime Minister John A. Macdonald.

The other member was Henry Nathan, Jr., a local businessman and the first MP of Jewish heritage.

For the 1872 general election, the Victoria District riding was replaced by Victoria riding. This was also the case with the similarly temporary Cariboo District, Yale District, New Westminster District, which were abolished and replaced by ridings without the "District" appellation.

== Election results ==
Canadian federal by-election, 20 September 1871
Party	Candidate	Votes
Liberal	Amor De Cosmos	acclaimed
Liberal	Henry Nathan Jr.	acclaimed
Source: lop.parl.ca

== See also ==
- List of Canadian federal electoral districts
- Historical federal electoral districts of Canada
