= Robert Mayhew =

Canadian politician

Member of Parliament for Victoria
- In office 1937–1953
- Preceded by: Simon Fraser Tolmie
- Succeeded by: Francis Fairey

Personal details
- Born: October 13, 1880 Cobden, Ontario, Canada
- Died: July 28, 1971 (aged 90)
- Party: Liberal
- Profession: businessman
- Cabinet: Minister of Fisheries (1948–1952)
- Portfolio: Parliamentary Assistant to the Minister of Finance (1945–1948)

Robert Wellington Mayhew, PC (October 13, 1880 – July 28, 1971) was a Canadian politician and diplomat.

Born in Cobden, Ontario, the son of Charles Mayhew and Sarah Dunlop Mayhew, he founded the Sidney Roofing and Paper Co. Ltd. in 1912 which became one of Victoria's largest businesses.

He was elected to the House of Commons of Canada for the riding of Victoria in a 1937 by-election. A Liberal, he was re-elected in 1940, 1945, and 1949. From 1945 to 1948, he was the parliamentary assistant to the Minister of Finance. From 1948 to 1952, he was the Minister of Fisheries. From 1952 to 1954, he was the first Canadian Ambassador to Japan.

In 1951, in San Francisco, along with Lester B. Pearson, he signed, on behalf of Canada, the Peace Treaty with Japan.

In 1966, he was awarded the City of Victoria's Freedom of the city, the highest award given by the city, for "eminent public service".

He married Grace Logan in 1908 and had three children. His only daughter, Jean Edwards Mayhew, married to James Alexander Lawrason, died January 5, 2006, in Peterborough, Ontario. His son Alan married Canadian sculptor Elza Mayhew; he died in 1943 while serving with the Royal Canadian Air Force when his plane went down in a hurricane.
