= George Riley (British Columbia politician) =

Canadian politician (1843–1916)

George Riley (April 2, 1843 – January 19, 1916) was a Canadian merchant and Liberal politician.

Born in St. Catharines, Canada West, the son of P. Riley, he was educated there and in Buffalo, New York. In 1885, Riley moved to British Columbia, becoming a merchant in Victoria. He married Mary N. Balfour in 1908.

He was chosen in a 1902 by-election to represent Victoria in the House of Commons of Canada, after the election of Edward Gawler Prior was voided. He was re-elected once, serving as an MP for Victoria City until 1906, when he resigned to allow William Templeman, a minister in Wilfrid Laurier's government, to take his seat. Shortly thereafter, Riley was appointed to the Senate.

Riley died in Victoria on January 19, 1916.

Parliament of Canada
Preceded by Edward Gawler Prior, Conservative	Member of Parliament for Victoria; 1902–1906	Succeeded by Riding becomes Victoria City and Nanaimo (electoral district)
Parliament of Canada
Preceded by Riding created from Victoria	Member of Parliament for Victoria City; 1904–1906	Succeeded by William Templeman, Liberal
