= David Turner (politician) =

Canadian university professor and politician

Mayor of Victoria, British Columbia
- In office 1991–1993
- Preceded by: Gretchen Brewin
- Succeeded by: Robert Cross (Canadian politician)

Personal details
- Born: c. 1944
- Education: University of Sheffield

David Turner (born 1944 in Nottingham, England) is a Canadian university professor and former politician. He was the mayor of Victoria, British Columbia, from 1991 to 1993. He is currently a professor at the University of Victoria.

Turner earned a Bachelor of Laws degree at the University of Sheffield in the United Kingdom. He moved to Canada in 1971.

He was elected mayor of Victoria in 1991, and held the position to 1993. He has run as a New Democratic Party candidate for the federal riding of Victoria in the 2000 and 2004 elections, but in both elections the riding was won by Liberal candidate David Anderson. He tried to get the NDP nomination for the 2006 election, but lost to Denise Savoie, who defeated Liberal candidate David Mulroney in the election.
