= Thomas Earle (Canadian politician) =

Canadian politician

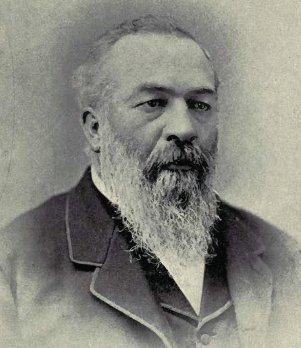

Member of the Canadian Parliament for Victoria
- In office 1889–1904
- Preceded by: Edgar Crow Baker
- Succeeded by: District was abolished in 1903

Personal details
- Born: September 27, 1837 Landsdowne Township, Upper Canada
- Died: July 13, 1911 (aged 73) Victoria, British Columbia, Canada
- Party: Conservative

Thomas Earle (September 27, 1837 – July 13, 1911) was a Canadian businessman and Conservative politician who represented Victoria in the House of Commons of Canada from 1889 to 1904.

Born in Landsdowne Township, Upper Canada, the son of William Earle, he was educated there and became a merchant in Brockville. Earle moved to the Cariboo district of British Columbia in 1863, establishing a grocery business in Victoria in 1873. He was also involved in railway construction in British Columbia, Oregon and Washington state. In 1875, he married Elizabeth Mason. Earle was acclaimed during a by-election following Edgar Crow Baker's resignation. He also served on Victoria City Council in 1885. Earle died in Victoria at the age of 73.
