= Henry Nathan Jr. =

Canadian politician (1842-1914)

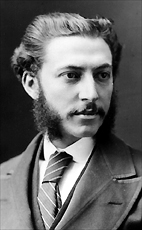

Member of Parliament for Victoria Victoria District (1871–1872)
- In office 1871–1874 Serving with Amor De Cosmos
- Preceded by: None
- Succeeded by: Francis James Roscoe

Personal details
- Born: September 3, 1842 London, England
- Died: February 5, 1914 (aged 71) London, England
- Party: Liberal

Henry Nathan Jr. (September 3, 1842 – February 5, 1914) was the first Jewish Canadian to be elected to the House of Commons. Born in London, England, Nathan was one of two MPs elected to represent the British Columbia riding of Victoria in the Canadian general election of 1872. They had won by acclamation special byelections held the year before to fill the newly created House of Commons seats upon British Columbia's admission to Confederation (in those byelections the riding was named Victoria District). The other representative for Victoria was B.C.'s Father of Confederation, Amor De Cosmos who was simultaneously Premier of that province until 1874. The third-place also-ran was Robert Beaven, who was to become the sixth Premier of British Columbia ten years later.

The son of Henry Nathan, Nathan was educated at the London University School and became a wholesale merchant in Victoria, British Columbia. He represented Victoria City in the assembly of the Colony of British Columbia from 1870 to 1871. Like De Cosmos, Nathan was part of British Columbia's delegation to Ottawa to negotiate the terms of B.C.'s entry into Confederation.

Once in Parliament, Nathan supported the government of Sir John A. Macdonald. This strained his relationship with De Cosmos, who had become a supporter of MacDonald's opponent, Liberal Alexander Mackenzie. As a result, Nathan took to calling de Cosmos "Cupid" in private letters (de Cosmos' name roughly translates to "Lover of the Universe").

The byelection of 1871 was held to return members from newly admitted British Columbia to the 1st Parliament of Canada that had been elected four years earlier following Confederation. With Nathan joining that Parliament, the multicultural nature of the Canadian nation was firmly established.

In 1876, Nathan returned to England. He died in London at the age of 71.

== Electoral record ==
1872 Canadian federal election: Victoria
Party	Candidate	Votes	%	Elected
Liberal	Henry Nathan Jr.	402	44.97	✓
Liberal	Amor De Cosmos	398	44.52	✓
Unknown	Robert Beaven	94	10.51	
Total valid votes		894	100.00	
Total rejected ballots		–		
Turnout		894	96.65	
Eligible voters		925		
This riding was created from Victoria District, which elected both Liberal Amor De Cosmos and Henry Nathan Jr. in the previous by-election.
Source: Library of Parliament

Canadian federal by-election, 20 September 1871: Victoria District
Party	Candidate	Votes
Liberal	Amor De Cosmos	acclaimed
Liberal	Henry Nathan Jr.	acclaimed
Source: lop.parl.ca
