= William Templeman (politician) =

Canadian politician (1844–1914)

The Honourable William Templeman PC
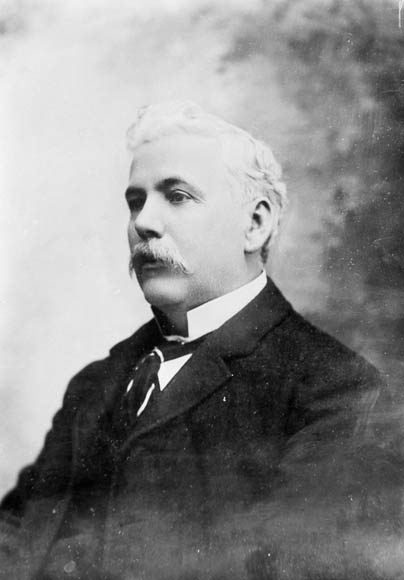

Canadian Senator from British Columbia
- In office November 18, 1897 – February 16, 1906
- Appointed by: Wilfrid Laurier

Member of Parliament for Victoria City
- In office 1906–1908
- Preceded by: George Riley
- Succeeded by: George Henry Barnard

Member of Parliament for Comox-Atlin
- In office 1909–1911
- Preceded by: William Sloan
- Succeeded by: Herbert Sylvester Clements

Personal details
- Born: September 28, 1844 Pakenham, Canada West
- Died: December 15, 1914 (aged 70)
- Party: Liberal
- Cabinet: Minister Without Portfolio (1902–1906); Minister of Inland Revenue (1906–1911); Minister of Mines (1907–1911)

William Templeman, PC (September 28, 1844 – December 15, 1914) was a Canadian newspaper editor and politician.

== Background ==
Born in Pakenham, Canada West, he was managing editor and owner of the Victoria Daily Times (now part of the Victoria Times-Colonist) newspaper, before first running as the Liberal candidate for the House of Commons of Canada for the riding of Victoria in the 1891 election. He was defeated in the election, in an 1896 by-election and in the 1896 federal election.

He was appointed to the Senate of Canada in 1897 representing the senatorial division of New Westminster, British Columbia. From 1902 to 1906, he was a Minister without Portfolio in the cabinet of Wilfrid Laurier.

He resigned from the Senate in 1906 to run in the riding of Victoria City when the current MP, George Riley (who was soon after appointed to the Senate), resigned to allow him to run. He was elected in the resulting by-election but was defeated in the 1908 federal election. In 1909, the current MP for the riding of Comox—Atlin, William Sloan, resigned to allow Templeman to be acclaimed as the MP in the resulting by-election. He was defeated again in the 1911 federal election in the riding of Victoria City. From 1906 to 1911, he was the Minister of Inland Revenue. From 1907 to 1911, he was the Minister of Mines.

Political offices
Preceded by The portfolio was created in 1907.	Minister of Mines; 1907–1911	Succeeded by Wilfrid Bruno Nantel
