= Laurel Collins =

Canadian politician

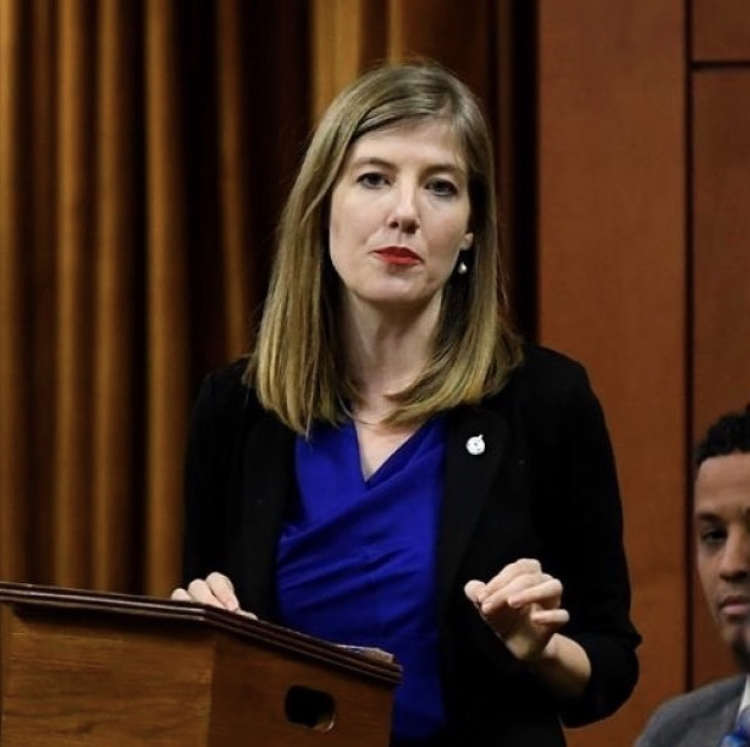
- Collins in 2021

Member of Parliament for Victoria
- In office October 21, 2019 – March 23, 2025
- Preceded by: Murray Rankin
- Succeeded by: Will Greaves

Victoria City Councillor
- In office October 20, 2018 – November 4, 2019

Personal details
- Born: May 7, 1984 (age 41) Kispiox, British Columbia, Canada
- Party: New Democratic Party
- Spouse: James McNish
- Children: 1

Laurel Collins (born May 7, 1984) is a Canadian politician who was elected to represent the riding of Victoria in the House of Commons of Canada in the 2019 Canadian federal election. Prior to her election in the House of Commons, she was a city councillor for Victoria City Council. Prior to losing her seat in the 2025 Canadian federal election, she was the NDP Critic for the Environment and Climate Change and the NDP Deputy Caucus Chair.

== Background ==
Collins was born in Kispiox in northern British Columbia, one of three children. Her parents, school teachers, separated when she was a baby, and she moved around the province, attending elementary school on Salt Spring Island, Alert Bay, and in Port Hardy. She went to high school in Sussex, New Brunswick and did her undergraduate degree at the University of King’s College and Dalhousie University in Halifax, Nova Scotia. She did a master's degree in Human Security and Peacebuilding at Royal Roads University.

== Career ==
Collins worked at Victoria Women in Need, running programs for women who have experienced abuse. She co-founded and co-chaired Divest Victoria, a non-profit organization that advocates for cities to take their money out of fossil fuels and put them into environmentally responsible investments. While researching climate migration and displacement, she worked with the United Nations High Commissioner for Refugees (UNHCR) in Northern Uganda helping to create durable solutions for internally displaced persons in the aftermath of deadly conflict.

From 2014 to 2019, Collins taught courses at the University of Victoria, including courses in Social Inequality, Social Justice Studies, Political Sociology, and the Sociology of Genders. In 2015, she co-published a book, Women, Adult Education, and Leadership in Canada. And, in 2017, she won a Victoria Community Leadership Award in Sustainability and Community Building.

In October 2018, Collins was elected as a city councillor for Victoria City Council with the electoral organization Together Victoria. She would resign from this position a year later, after her election to the House of Commons in late October 2019. The byelection following her departure was delayed due to the coronavirus pandemic until December 2020, where it eventually resulted in the by-election of Stephen Andrew.

Collins was re-elected in the 2021 federal election.

She was the NDP Critic for the Environment and Climate Change and the Deputy Critic for Families, Children, and Social Development.

In the 2025 Canadian federal election, she was unseated by Liberal candidate Will Greaves.

== Electoral record ==
2025 Canadian federal election: Victoria
** Preliminary results — Not yet official **
Party	Candidate	Votes	%	±%	Expenditures
Liberal	Will Greaves	41,100	54.28	+27.00	
New Democratic	Laurel Collins	18,864	24.91	–19.02	
Conservative	Angus Ross	12,868	17.00	+3.28	
Green	Michael Doherty	2,331	3.08	–8.12	
People's	David Mohr	278	0.37	–2.73	
Rhinoceros	Cody Fraser	108	0.14	N/A	
Independent	Steve Filipovic	83	0.11	N/A	
Christian Heritage	Mary Moreau	83	0.11	N/A	
Total valid votes/expense limit					
Total rejected ballots					
Turnout		75,715	74.72		
Eligible voters		101,326			
Liberal gain from New Democratic		Swing		+23.01	
Source: Elections Canada

2021 Canadian federal election: Victoria
Party	Candidate	Votes	%	±%	Expenditures
New Democratic	Laurel Collins	29,301	43.9	+10.7	$97,858.71
Liberal	Nikki Macdonald	18,194	27.3	+5.0	$97,566.80
Conservative	Hannah Hodson	9,152	13.7	+1.1	$18,401.29
Green	Nick Loughton	7,472	11.2	-18.7	$93,634.92
People's	John Randal Phipps	2,065	3.1	+1.8	$7,982.12
Communist	Janis Zroback	273	0.4	+0.2	$0.00
Animal Protection	Jordan Reichert	243	0.4	-	$2,364.23
Total valid votes/expense limit		66,748	–	–	$126,387.28
Total rejected ballots		468			
Turnout		67,216			
Eligible voters		99,889			
New Democratic hold		Swing		+7.85	
Source: Elections Canada

2019 Canadian federal election: Victoria
Party	Candidate	Votes	%	±%	Expenditures
New Democratic	Laurel Collins	23,765	33.2	-9.1	$114,384.10
Green	Racelle Kooy	21,383	29.9	-3.0	$78,891.28
Liberal	Nikki Macdonald	15,952	22.3	+10.5	$83,095.70
Conservative	Richard Caron	9,038	12.6	+0.8	$41,312.21
People's	Alyson Culbert	920	1.3	-	$5,286.41
Animal Protection	Jordan Reichert	221	0.3	0.0	$2,270.91
Communist	Robert Duncan	113	0.2	-	
Independent	David Shebib	111	0.2	-	
Veterans Coalition	Keith Rosenberg	46	0.1	-	
Total valid votes/expense limit		71,549	99.3		$121,316.37
Total rejected ballots		475	0.7		
Turnout		72,024	76.1		
Eligible voters		94,627			
New Democratic hold		Swing		-6.10	
Source: Elections Canada
