= Gretchen Brewin =

Canadian politician (born 1938)

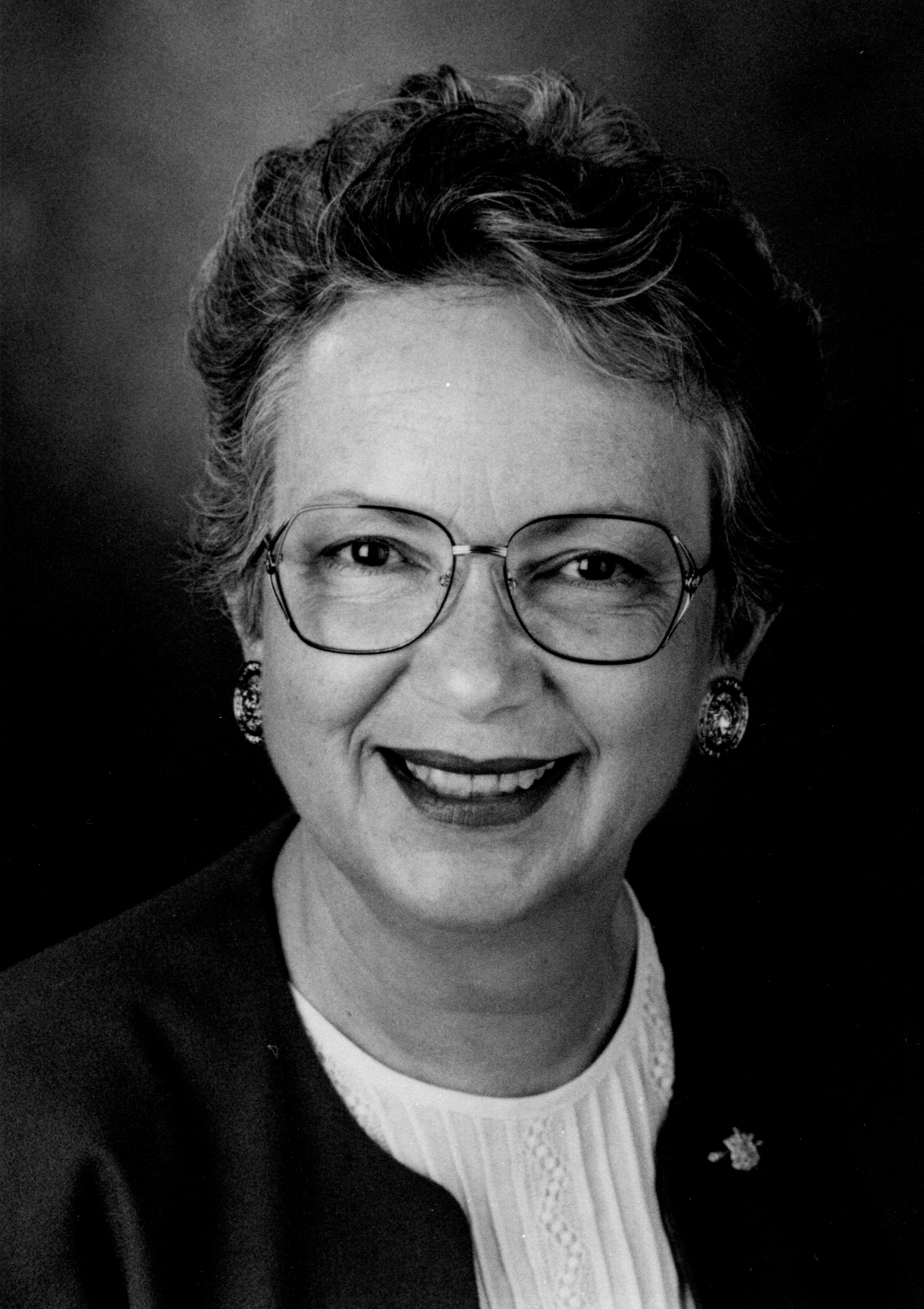

33rd Speaker of the Legislative Assembly of British Columbia
- In office March 26, 1998 – February 29, 2000
- Preceded by: Dale Lovick
- Succeeded by: Bill Hartley

Deputy Speaker of the Legislative Assembly of British Columbia
- In office June 25, 1996 – March 26, 1998
- Preceded by: Dale Lovick
- Succeeded by: Bill Hartley

Member of the British Columbia Legislative Assembly for Victoria-Beacon Hill
- In office October 17, 1991 – May 16, 2001
- Preceded by: Riding Established
- Succeeded by: Jeff Bray

Mayor of Victoria
- In office 1985–1990
- Preceded by: Peter Pollen
- Succeeded by: David Turner

Personal details
- Born: Patricia Gretchen Mann; December 23, 1938 (age 87) Ottawa, Ontario
- Party: New Democratic
- Spouse: John Brewin

Patricia Gretchen Mann Brewin (born December 23, 1938), known as Gretchen, is a Canadian politician.

== Personal life ==
Brewin was born in Ottawa, Ontario to mother Marjorie Mann and Walter Mann on December 23, 1938. Gretchen has one sister, Susan Mann. She graduated from Glebe Collegiate and attended the University of Toronto for one year before marrying John Brewin in 1958. Her parents and parents-in-law were all active in the CCF (Cooperative Commonwealth Federation), and founding members of its new version, the NDP. Andrew Brewin, her father-in-law, was a member of parliament from 1962 to 1979. She and John had four children, Gillian (1959), Andrew (1960), Jennifer (1963), and Alison (1964) Brewin.

== Career ==
Brewin began her political career in Scarborough, Ontario, when she was elected to the school board in the 1960s. She and her family moved to Victoria, British Columbia in 1973 where husband John took a position with the NDP Barrett government. Brewin returned to university, receiving her BA in political science from the University of Victoria in 1978.

Brewin was elected to Victoria city council in 1979, then elected as Mayor of Victoria in November 1985 and served until 1990. She was the first female mayor in the city's history.

Brewin served as a NDP Member of the Legislative Assembly of British Columbia for the riding of Victoria-Beacon Hill from 1991 to 2001. Brewin was speaker for the legislative assembly of BC from March 1998 to February 2000. From February to November 2000, she was a member of the provincial cabinet, serving as Minister for Children and Families.

Brewin and John divorced in 1991. She lives in Vancouver, British Columbia, and has seven grandchildren, three step-grandchildren, two step-great-grandchildren, and one great-grandchild.

British Columbia provincial government of Ujjal Dosanjh
Cabinet post (1)
| Predecessor | Office | Successor |
|---|---|---|
| Lois Boone | Minister of Children and Families; February 29, 2000–November 1, 2000 | Edward John |
