= Francis James Roscoe =

Canadian politician (1830–78)

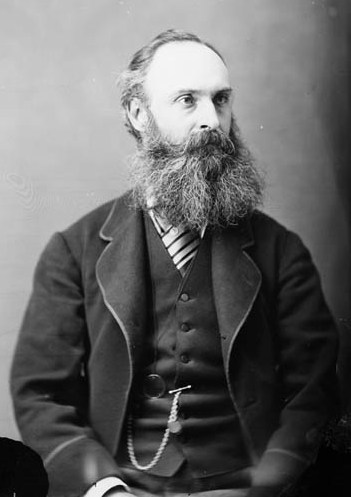

Member of the Canadian Parliament for Victoria
- In office 1874–1878 Serving with Amor De Cosmos
- Preceded by: Henry Nathan, Jr. Amor De Cosmos
- Succeeded by: John A. Macdonald; Amor De Cosmos

Personal details
- Born: December 28, 1830 Liverpool, England
- Died: December 20, 1878 (aged 47) Victoria, British Columbia
- Party: Independent Liberal
- Spouse: Anna Letitia Le Breton

Francis James Roscoe (December 28, 1830 – December 20, 1878) was a Canadian entrepreneur and Member of Parliament.

Francis Roscoe was born in Liverpool, England, the son of W.S. Roscoe. He was educated at University College and the University of London and came to the Colony of Vancouver Island in 1862, settling in the Ross Bay area of Victoria. He was the younger brother of poet William Caldwell Roscoe and the grandson of English historian and writer William Roscoe. In 1864, he married Anna Letitia Le Breton, the daughter of Charles Rochemont Aikin. Roscoe was a partner in several hardware and ironware ventures. In 1870, he became the Commissioner of Savings Banks for the British Columbia colony. Roscoe stood for election as an Independent Liberal candidate in the Canadian federal election in 1874 in the two-member Victoria riding. He placed second in a close three-way race and was elected along with Liberal incumbent Amor De Cosmos.

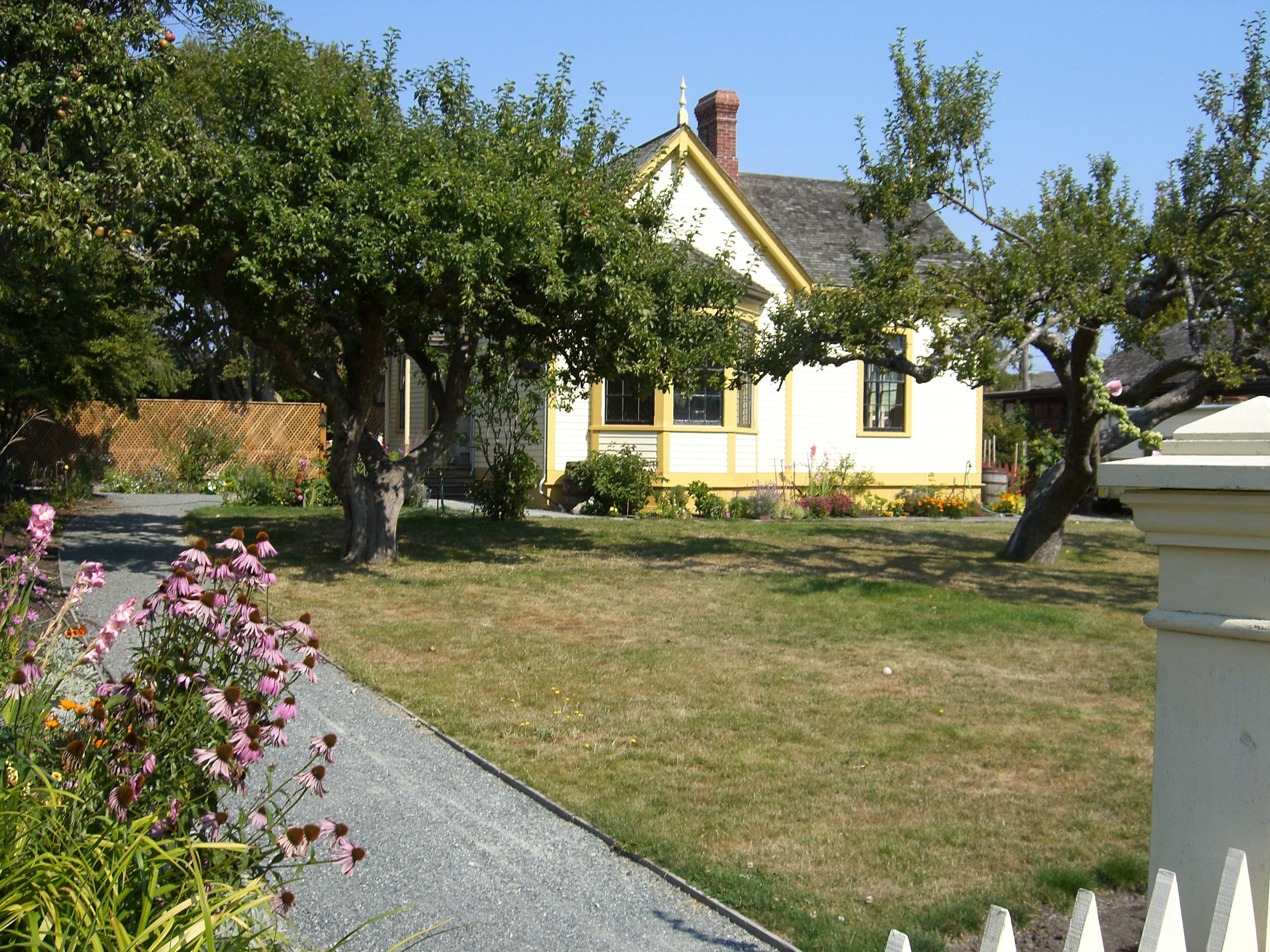
Ross Bay Villa

Roscoe did not stand for re-election in 1878 and died later in the year in Victoria at the age of 47. He was replaced in the seat by incoming Prime Minister John A. Macdonald who had lost his Ontario seat earlier as the BC portion of the election was delayed, and because he was deemed unelectable in eastern Canada due to ongoing politics surrounding his role in the Pacific Scandal.

Roscoe's Victoria home is today preserved by The Ross Bay Villa Society as a rare example of a pre-Confederation colonial house.
