= Will Greaves =

Canadian politician

Will Greaves MP

Member of Parliament for Victoria
- Incumbent
- Assumed office April 28, 2025
- Preceded by: Laurel Collins

Personal details
- Born: September 25, 1984 (age 41)
- Party: Liberal
- Children: 1
- Education: Bishop's University (B.A.), University of Calgary (M.A.), University of Toronto (Ph.D.)
- Profession: Associate professor
- Website: willgreaves.com

Wilfrid Greaves MP is a Canadian academic and politician from the Liberal Party of Canada. He was elected Member of Parliament for Victoria in the 2025 Canadian federal election. Prior to his election, Greaves was an associate professor of political science at the University of Victoria. Greaves is the son and grandson of diplomats in Canada's foreign service.

== Electoral record ==
2025 Canadian federal election: Victoria
Party	Candidate	Votes	%	±%	Expenditures
Liberal	Will Greaves	41,128	54.28	+27.02	$125,500.20
New Democratic	Laurel Collins	18,877	24.91	–18.98	$113,060.85
Conservative	Angus Ross	12,870	16.99	+3.28	$73,190.29
Green	Michael Doherty	2,350	3.10	–8.09	$20,849.60
People's	David Mohr	278	0.37	–2.72	$1,093.92
Rhinoceros	Cody Fraser	109	0.14	–	none listed
Christian Heritage	Mary Moreau	83	0.11	–	$550.00
Independent	Steve Filipovic	73	0.10	–	$279.78
Total valid votes/expense limit		75,768	99.51	–	$146,326.64
Total rejected ballots		370	0.49	–0.21	
Turnout		76,138	74.41	+7.96	
Eligible voters		102,322			
Liberal gain from New Democratic		Swing		+23.00	
Source: Elections Canada
