= George Henry Barnard =

Canadian lawyer and politician

George Henry Barnard, QC (November 9, 1868 – January 13, 1954) was a Canadian lawyer and Conservative politician.

Born in Victoria, British Columbia, the son of Francis Jones Barnard and Ellen Stillman, Barnard was educated at Trinity College School in Port Hope, Ontario and qualified for the bar, entering practice in Victoria. He was appointed King's Counsel in 1907.

In 1902 he was elected to the Victoria City Council as an alderman, and from 1904 to 1905 was mayor. He represented Victoria City in the House of Commons of Canada for two terms from 1908 to 1917. He was then appointed to the Senate, where he served until retiring in 1945.

His brother Sir Frank Stillman Barnard was also an MP, who would become Lieutenant-Governor of British Columbia.

Parliament of Canada
| Preceded by William Templeman | Member of Parliament from Victoria City; 1908-1917 | Succeeded by Simon Fraser Tolmie |
