= John Ernest McMillin =

Canadian politician

The Hon. John Ernest McMillin

Member of the Canadian Parliament for Greenwood
- In office 1949–1949
- Preceded by: Denton Massey
- Succeeded by: James Macdonnell

Personal details
- Born: 1884 Kingston, Ontario, Canada
- Died: August 20, 1949 Toronto, Ontario, Canada
- Party: Progressive Conservative
- Spouse: Delphine
- Children: 1
- Occupation: Building contractor

John Ernest McMillin (1884 – August 20, 1949) was a Toronto building contractor who was elected to the House of Commons of Canada.

McMillin was a building contractor working in the east end of Toronto for 20 years prior to his death and was also a partner in the Main Realty Company of Toronto and president of the Ontario Property Owners Association.

He became active in politics in 1934. In 1943, he was elected as a school trustee for Toronto's Ward 8.

McMillin was elected as the Progressive Conservative Member of Parliament for the Toronto riding of Greenwood in the June 1949 federal election defeating Liberal Perry Ryan by less than 200 votes. However, McMillin died in August before the new Parliament was able to meet.

He was also a member of the United Church of Canada and had been on the board of stewards of Glenmount United Church.

McMillin died suddenly of a heart attack early on August 20, 1949 only 59 days into his term.

An October by-election to fill the vacancy created by McMillin's death returned Progressive Conservative James MacKerras Macdonnell to Parliament.
