= Elza Mayhew =

Canadian sculptor (1916-2004)

- Born: Elza Edith Lovitt; January 19, 1916; Victoria, British Columbia
- Died: January 11, 2004 (aged 87); Victoria, British Columbia
- Education: BA from the University of British Columbia in 1937 and a MFA from the University of Oregon in 1963
- Known for: sculptor
- Spouse: Charles Alan Mayhew (d. 1943)

Elza Edith Mayhew RCA (January 19, 1916 – January 11, 2004) was a Canadian sculptor who worked mainly in bronze.

== Life ==
The daughter of Alice Bordman and George Lovitt, She was born Elza Edith Lovitt in Victoria, British Columbia. Mayhew received a BA from the University of British Columbia in 1937 and a MFA from the University of Oregon in 1963. From 1955 to 1958, she studied with Jan Zach, a Czech-born sculptor based in Oregon.

In 1938, she married Charles Alan Mayhew, the son of Robert Mayhew; the couple had two children. He died in June 1943 when his plane went down during a hurricane while he was serving in the Royal Canadian Air Force.

In later life, Mayhew suffered from brain damage brought on by styrene poisoning from the styrofoam moulds that she used during the sculpting process. She died at the Lodge at Broadmead in Victoria at the age of 87.

Her former studio in Victoria has been designated as a heritage building by the city of Victoria.

== Work ==
Mayhew, who produced her sculptures from the mid-1950s to the 1980s, is best known for her large-scale abstract bronze sculptures which were mainly cast at a foundry in Eugene, Oregon. She produced commissioned works for international events such as Expo 67, Expo 86 and an international trade fair in Tokyo, as well as for public institutions such as the Bank of Canada, the University of Victoria, the Canadian National Capital Commission and the Royal British Columbia Museum.

Colin Graham of the Art Gallery of Greater Victoria described her sculptures as "modern in concept yet having affinities with the past, with totemic poles, Mayan stelae, Egyptian stone sculpture, and other hieratic forms".

== Awards and service ==
In 1962, she received the Otto Beit Medal from the Royal Society of British Sculptors. In 1964, with Harold Town, she represented Canada at the Venice Biennale. She served on the board of directors for the International Sculpture Center in Kansas from 1968 to 1979. She was a member of the Royal Canadian Academy of Arts.

Mayhew was the subject of the 1985 film Time-Markers: The Sculpture of Elza Mayhew.

== Collections ==
Her work is included in the collections of the Art Gallery of Greater Victoria, the Musée national des beaux-arts du Québec, the National Gallery of Canada, Simon Fraser University and the University of Victoria. Her sculpture Column of the Sea is located at the Confederation Centre Art Gallery in Charlottetown.
