= Denton Massey =

Canadian politician

The Reverend Denton Massey OBE

Member of Parliament for Greenwood
- In office 14 October 1935 – 26 June 1949
- Preceded by: Riding created
- Succeeded by: John McMillin

Personal details
- Born: 20 June 1900 Toronto, Ontario, Canada
- Died: 25 January 1984 (aged 83) Kitchener, Ontario, Canada
- Party: Conservative; Progressive Conservative
- Spouse: Esther Jeralds (m. 1922)
- Children: 3, including Walter
- Relatives: Massey family
- Education: Yale University; University of Toronto; Massachusetts Institute of Technology
- Occupation: Engineer; minister; clergy

Military service
- Allegiance: Canada
- Branch/service: Royal Canadian Air Force
- Years of service: 1940–1946
- Rank: Group captain
- Battles/wars: World War II

Denton Massey OBE (20 June 1900 – 25 January 1984) was a Canadian engineer, Anglican priest and politician.

Born in Toronto, Ontario, son of Walter Edward Massey and Susan Marie Denton Massey and the grandson of the founder of the Massey agricultural manufacturing company, Hart Massey, he attended St. Andrew's College in Aurora, Ontario, and the University of Toronto, where he became a member of the Kappa Alpha Society, before attending the Massachusetts Institute of Technology where he received a degree in engineering in 1922.

Massey was the founder of the York Bible Class which attracted thousands of young people and began broadcasting on the fledgling Toronto radio station CFRB in March 1927. His religious programs were broadcast on Toronto radio stations both before and after World War II.

He served in the House of Commons of Canada as a Conservative MP for the Toronto riding of Greenwood from 1935 to 1949 and was, in 1938, an unsuccessful candidate at the Conservative leadership convention.

Massey joined the Royal Canadian Air Force in 1940 and reached the rank of group captain. He was made an officer of the Order of the British Empire for his efforts during the war in 1946.

After leaving politics, Massey became a priest. He served at St. Paul's Anglican Church in Point Edward, Ontario, from 1960 to 1963 and the Church of the Holy Saviour in Waterloo, Ontario, from 1963 to 1970.

Massey was a cousin of Canadian Governor General Vincent Massey and actor Raymond Massey. He was also a cousin of Canadian philosopher George Grant and 21st-century Liberal Party leader Michael Ignatieff. His son was actor Walter Massey.
