= Greenwood (Ontario federal electoral district) =

Former federal electoral district in Ontario, Canada

Ontario electoral district
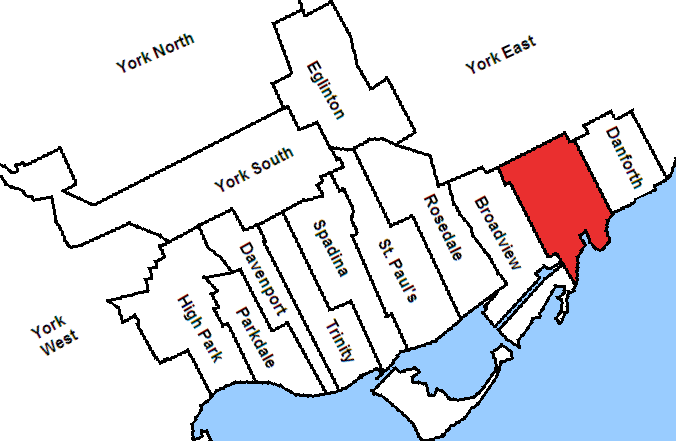
- The boundaries of Greenwood from 1933 to 1947

Defunct federal electoral district
- Legislature: House of Commons
- District created: 1933
- District abolished: 1979
- First contested: 1935
- Last contested: 1974

Demographics
- Population (1941)Census of Canada: 58,346
- Electors (1945): 41,680
- Census division: Toronto
- Census subdivision: Toronto

Greenwood was a federal electoral district represented in the House of Commons of Canada from 1935 to 1979. It was located in east end of the city of Toronto in the province of Ontario. This riding was created in 1933 from parts of Toronto East and Toronto—Scarborough ridings.

It initially was bounded on the south by Lake Ontario, on the east by Woodbine Avenue, on the north by the city limits, and on the west by the eastern boundary of Broadview riding.

In 1947, the western limit was redefined to be (from north to south) from the city limit south along Langford Avenue, east along Danforth Avenue, south along Jones Avenue, east along Queen Street East, south along Rushbrook Avenue, east along Eastern Avenue, and south along Leslie Street to Lake Ontario.

In 1966, it was redefined to be bounded on the east by the east limit of the City of Toronto and Victoria Park Avenue, on the north by a line drawn west along Danforth Avenue, north along Woodbine Avenue, west along Milverton Boulevard, on the west by Greenwood Avenue, and including the area south of Queen Street East between Greenwood and Leslie Street.

The electoral district was abolished in 1976 when it was redistributed between Beaches and York East ridings.

== Members of Parliament ==
This riding has elected the following members of Parliament:

Parliament	Years	Member	Party
Riding created from Toronto East and Toronto—Scarborough
18th	1935–1940	Denton Massey	Conservative
19th	1940–1945	Denton Massey	National Government
20th	1945–1949	Denton Massey	Progressive Conservative
21st	1949–1949†	John Ernest McMillin	Progressive Conservative
21st	1949–1953	James Macdonnell	Progressive Conservative
22nd	1953–1957	James Macdonnell	Progressive Conservative
23rd	1957–1958	James Macdonnell	Progressive Conservative
24th	1958–1962	James Macdonnell	Progressive Conservative
25th	1962–1963	Andrew Brewin	New Democratic
26th	1963–1965	Andrew Brewin	New Democratic
27th	1965–1968	Andrew Brewin	New Democratic
28th	1968–1972	Andrew Brewin	New Democratic
29th	1972–1974	Andrew Brewin	New Democratic
30th	1974–1979	Andrew Brewin	New Democratic
Riding dissolved into Beaches and York East

== Election results ==
=== 1933 boundaries ===
1935 Canadian federal election
Party	Candidate	Votes
Conservative	Denton Massey	11,183
Liberal	Ernest Bray	6,969
Co-operative Commonwealth	Bertram Elijah Leavens	4,813
Reconstruction	George Springfield Hougham	4,720

1940 Canadian federal election
Party	Candidate	Votes
National Government	Denton Massey	14,710
Liberal	Thomas Reilly	7,397
Co-operative Commonwealth	Bertram E. Leavens	3,430

1945 Canadian federal election
Party	Candidate	Votes
Progressive Conservative	Denton Massey	13,475
Liberal	Charles Joseph Kelz	7,143
Co-operative Commonwealth	Harvey Angus Hotrum	6,495
Labor–Progressive	James Davis	468

=== 1947 boundaries ===
1949 Canadian federal election
Party	Candidate	Votes
Progressive Conservative	John Ernest McMillin	10,454
Liberal	Sylvester Perry Ryan	10,291
Co-operative Commonwealth	Harvey Hotrum	8,777

On Mr. McMillin's death before taking his seat, 20 August 1949:

By-election on 24 October 1949
Party	Candidate	Votes
Progressive Conservative	James Macdonnell	9,399
Liberal	Sylvester Perry Ryan	7,230
Co-operative Commonwealth	Harvey Angus Hotrum	6,580
Labor–Progressive	Louise Watson	189

1953 Canadian federal election
Party	Candidate	Votes
Progressive Conservative	James Macdonnell	9,702
Liberal	Inez Somers	6,404
Co-operative Commonwealth	Maurice Charles Punshon	5,334
Labor–Progressive	Stewart Smith	610

1957 Canadian federal election
Party	Candidate	Votes
Progressive Conservative	James Macdonnell	12,422
Co-operative Commonwealth	Maurice C. Pumshon	6,035
Liberal	Inez Somers	4,803

1958 Canadian federal election
Party	Candidate	Votes
Progressive Conservative	James Macdonnell	16,284
Co-operative Commonwealth	Maurice Charles Punshon	5,626
Liberal	Inez Somers	4,320

1962 Canadian federal election
Party	Candidate	Votes
New Democratic	Andrew Brewin	9,238
Progressive Conservative	James Macdonnell	8,694
Liberal	Thomas Edgar Reilly	6,338
Social Credit	George B. McLenon	233

1963 Canadian federal election
Party	Candidate	Votes
New Democratic	Andrew Brewin	9,421
Progressive Conservative	John Hilton	7,221
Liberal	T. Edgar Reilly	7,207
Social Credit	Peter Lonsdale	224

1965 Canadian federal election
Party	Candidate	Votes
New Democratic	Andrew Brewin	10,590
Liberal	Martin P. O'Connell	5,952
Progressive Conservative	Mike Beach	5,573

=== 1966 boundaries ===
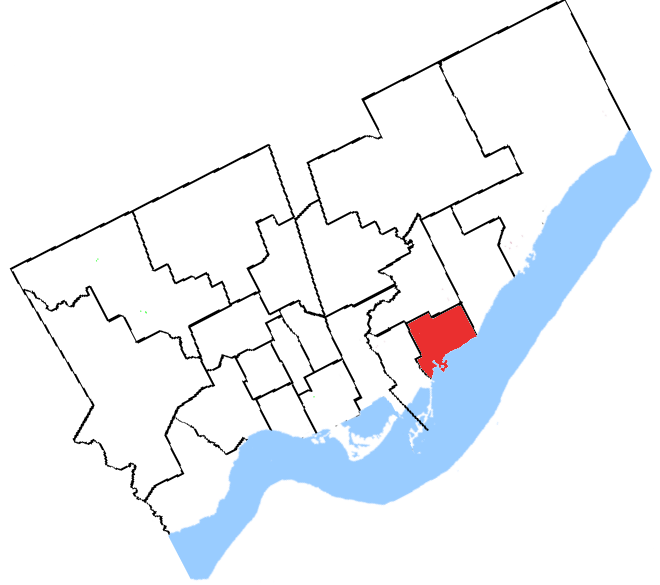
The boundaries of Greenwood from 1966 to 1976

1968 Canadian federal election
Party	Candidate	Votes
New Democratic	Andrew Brewin	12,117
Liberal	Walter James	11,755
Progressive Conservative	Gordon Stewart	8,268

1972 Canadian federal election
Party	Candidate	Votes
New Democratic	Andrew Brewin	14,261
Progressive Conservative	William E. Taylor	11,190
Liberal	Larry Glass	7,722
Social Credit	George Alexander Leslie	117
Not affiliated	Carl Blashill	79

1974 Canadian federal election
Party	Candidate	Votes
New Democratic	Andrew Brewin	11,038
Liberal	Joe James	10,922
Progressive Conservative	Chad Bark	9,589
Independent	Alex Lauder	91
Social Credit	Geo. A. Leslie	76
Marxist–Leninist	Jim R. McKibbin	64
Not affiliated	Bret Smiley	4

== See also ==
- List of Canadian electoral districts
- Historical federal electoral districts of Canada
