= Andrew Brewin =

Canadian politician (1907–1983)

Andrew Brewin QC
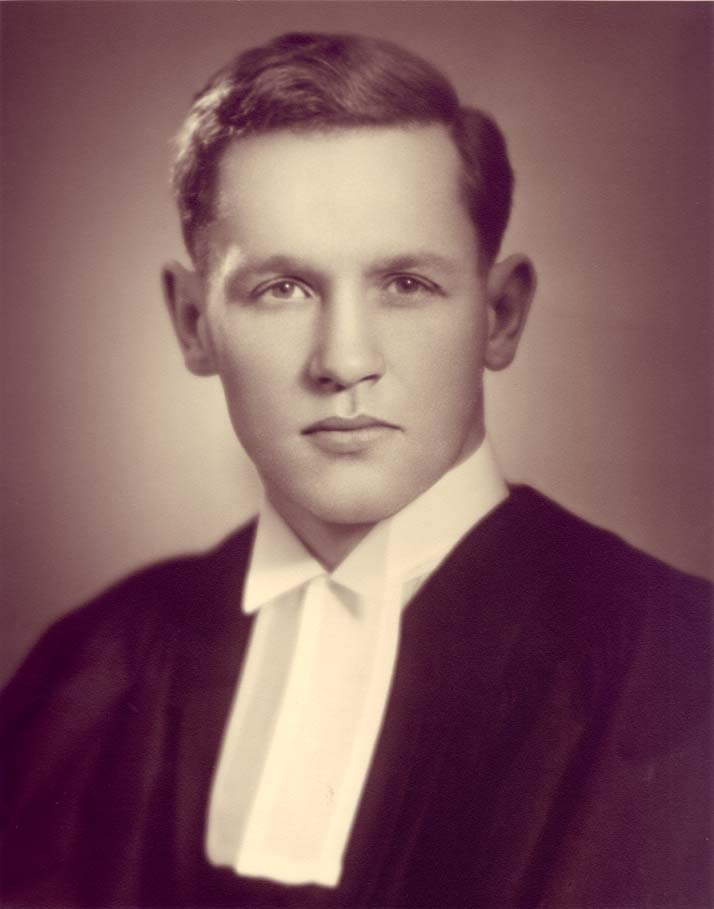
- Brewin, c. 1938

Member of Parliament for Greenwood
- In office 1962–1979
- Preceded by: James Macdonnell
- Succeeded by: Riding redistributed into Beaches and York East

Personal details
- Born: Francis Andrew Brewin; 3 September 1907 Brighton, England
- Died: 21 September 1983 (aged 76)
- Party: Co-operative Commonwealth Federation; New Democratic Party
- Spouse: Peggy Biggar (m. 1935)
- Children: John Brewin
- Relatives: Andrew George Blair (grandfather) Pericles Lewis (grandson) Jennifer Brewin (granddaughter)
- Profession: Lawyer

Francis Andrew Brewin QC (1907–1983) was a lawyer and Canadian politician and Member of Parliament. He was the grandson of Andrew George Blair a Liberal cabinet minister who was also the Premier of New Brunswick. His son John Brewin also served in the House of Commons of Canada.

== Biography ==
Born on 3 September 1907 in Brighton, England, Brewin was a stalwart in the Co-operative Commonwealth Federation (CCF) and ran numerous times at the federal and provincial levels in the 1940 and 1950s. As a lawyer in the 1940s, he was retained by the Co-operative Committee on Japanese Canadians to contest the federal government's deportation orders affecting thousands of Japanese Canadians. Led by Brewin, the "Japanese Canadian Reference Case" was heard by the Supreme Court of Canada and later, on appeal, by the Judicial Committee of the Privy Council. Brewin was also retained by a committee of Japanese Canadians who had been detained during the Second World War as "enemy aliens" in order to try to have their property restored. He succeeded in persuading the government to call a royal commission to investigate the question.

In 1945, he was asked by Ontario CCF leader Ted Jolliffe to be co-counsel during the infamous LeBel Royal Commission that was looking into whether or not Ontario's premier at the time was employing a secret political police force. He was, for a time, the President of the Ontario CCF and was a candidate for the leadership of the Ontario CCF at the party's 1953 leadership convention, but lost to Donald C. MacDonald.

Brewin stood as a CCF candidate several times, starting with the 1945 Canadian federal election in the riding of St. Paul's, but was unsuccessful. He was first elected to the House of Commons of Canada on behalf of the CCF's successor, the New Democratic Party. Brewin sat as Member of Parliament for the Toronto riding of Greenwood from the 1962 election until his retirement in 1979.

Coming from the theological tradition of figures such as Richard Hooker, F. D. Maurice, and William Temple, Andrew Brewin considered himself a Christian socialist and wrote a number of books and pamphlets on the topic. He was a member of the Fellowship for a Christian Social Order and the League for Social Reconstruction.

Andrew Brewin wrote the book Stand on Guard: The Search for a Canadian Defence Policy, published by McClelland & Stewart in 1965, that explored Canada's military's changing role in the mid-twentieth century, including its participation in the then new concept of United Nations peacekeeping.

His son John Brewin later served in Parliament. He also had four daughters: Margaret Wilbur; Martha Hynna, who served as secretary general of the Canadian Human Rights Commission; Mary Lewis, who served as chief mission and research officer of the Heart and Stroke Foundation; and Jane Morley, QC, who served as child and youth officer for British Columbia.

Brewin died on 21 September 1983.

== Electoral record ==
1957 Canadian federal election: Davenport, Toronto
Party	Candidate	Votes	%	±%
Progressive Conservative	M. Douglas Morton	8,989	40.7	-0.4
Liberal	Paul Hellyer	6,665	30.2	-2.1
Co-operative Commonwealth	F. Andrew Brewin	6,414	29.1	+6.2
Total valid votes		22,068	100.0	

1958 Canadian federal election: Davenport, Toronto
Party	Candidate	Votes	%	±%
Progressive Conservative	M. Douglas Morton	12,117	48.6	+7.8
Liberal	Paul Hellyer	7,872	31.5	+1.3
Co-operative Commonwealth	F. Andrew Brewin	4,963	19.9	-9.2
Total valid votes		24,952	100.0	

1962 Canadian federal election: Greenwood, Toronto
Party	Candidate	Votes
New Democratic	Andrew Brewin	9,238
Progressive Conservative	James Macdonnell	8,694
Liberal	Thomas Edgar Reilly	6,338
Social Credit	George B. McLenon	233

1963 Canadian federal election: Greenwood, Toronto
Party	Candidate	Votes
New Democratic	Andrew Brewin	9,421
Progressive Conservative	John Hilton	7,221
Liberal	T. Edgar Reilly	7,207
Social Credit	Peter Lonsdale	224

1965 Canadian federal election: Greenwood, Toronto
Party	Candidate	Votes
New Democratic	Andrew Brewin	10,590
Liberal	Martin P. O'Connell	5,952
Progressive Conservative	Mike Beach	5,573

1968 Canadian federal election: Greenwood, Toronto
Party	Candidate	Votes
New Democratic	Andrew Brewin	12,117
Liberal	Walter James	11,755
Progressive Conservative	Gordon Stewart	8,268

1972 Canadian federal election: Greenwood, Toronto
Party	Candidate	Votes
New Democratic	Andrew Brewin	14,261
Progressive Conservative	William E. Taylor	11,190
Liberal	Larry Glass	7,722
Social Credit	George Alexander Leslie	117
Not affiliated	Carl Blashill	79

1974 Canadian federal election: Greenwood, Toronto
Party	Candidate	Votes
New Democratic	Andrew Brewin	11,038
Liberal	Joe James	10,922
Progressive Conservative	Chad Bark	9,589
Independent	Alex Lauder	91
Social Credit	Geo. A. Leslie	76
Marxist–Leninist	Jim R. McKibbin	64
Not affiliated	Bret Smiley	4

== See also ==
- Internment of Japanese Canadians
