= D'Arcy Plunkett =

Canadian politician

Member of Parliament for Victoria
- In office 6 December 1928 – 3 May 1936
- Preceded by: Simon Fraser Tolmie
- Succeeded by: Simon Fraser Tolmie

Personal details
- Born: D'Arcy Britton Plunkett; 1872 Orillia, Ontario, Canada
- Died: 3 May 1936 (age 64) Ottawa, Ontario, Canada
- Party: Conservative
- Profession: ironworker

D'Arcy Britton Plunkett (1872 – 3 May 1936) was a Conservative member of the House of Commons of Canada. He was born in Orillia, Ontario and became an ironworker.

Plunkett served in the military as an air mechanic for the Royal Flying Corps.

He was first elected to Parliament at the Victoria, British Columbia riding in a by-election on 6 December 1928 then re-elected in 1930 and 1935. Plunkett died on 3 May 1936 from pneumonia before completing his term in the 18th Canadian Parliament. He remained single until death, leaving three brothers and three nephews. Plunkett was buried in Orillia.
