= Noah Shakespeare =

Canadian politician

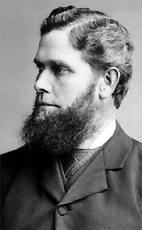
Noah Shakespeare

Noah Shakespeare (January 26, 1839 – May 13, 1921) was a Canadian politician from British Columbia noted for his involvement in the anti-Chinese movement.

Shakespeare was born in Staffordshire, England, arriving in Victoria, British Columbia in 1863. Shakespeare was involved in the photography business, running a gallery and acting as an agent for others. He made an early run for office as an independent candidate in the second British Columbia election in 1875, coming fourth in a two-member district.

Shakespeare was a leader in the anti-Chinese movement in the city. He became president of the Workingmen's Protective Association in 1878. The short-lived organization was established to lobby for restrictions on Chinese immigration during the 1878 election. Shakespeare's politics were popular in the Victoria of his day. He was elected mayor in 1882. He was also elected as a Conservative Member of Parliament that year, defeating former B.C. Premier Amor De Cosmos in the Victoria district. Shakespeare was re-elected in 1887 but resigned his seat only three months later to become Postmaster for Victoria.

Parliament of Canada
Preceded by Amor De Cosmos, Liberal	Member of Parliament for Victoria; 1882–1887	Succeeded by Edward Prior, Conservative
