= Victoria City (federal electoral district) =

Former federal electoral district in British Columbia, Canada

Coordinates: 48.43°N 123.37°W

British Columbia electoral district

Defunct federal electoral district
- Legislature: House of Commons
- District created: 1903
- District abolished: 1924
- First contested: 1904
- Last contested: 1921

Victoria City was a federal electoral district in British Columbia, Canada, that was represented in the House of Commons of Canada from 1904 to 1924. This riding was created in 1903 from Victoria riding. It was identical at the time of its creation to the provincial electoral district of the same name. It was abolished in 1924 into a new Victoria riding.

The district elected its MP through First past the post voting system.

== Geography ==
It covered the City of Victoria.

== Members of Parliament ==
Parliament	Years	Member	Party
Riding created from Victoria
10th	1904–1906	George Riley	Liberal
10th	1906–1908	William Templeman	Liberal
11th	1908–1911	George Henry Barnard	Conservative
12th	1911–1917	George Henry Barnard	Conservative
13th	1917–1919	Simon Fraser Tolmie	Government (Unionist)
13th	1919–1921	Simon Fraser Tolmie	Government (Unionist)
14th	1921–1925	Simon Fraser Tolmie	Conservative
Riding dissolved into Victoria

== Election results ==
1921 Canadian federal election
Party	Candidate	Votes	%	±%
Conservative	Simon Fraser Tolmie	7,485	59.79	+1.12
Liberal	William McKinnon Ivel	5,033	40.21	–
Total valid votes		12,518	100.00	
Total rejected ballots		–		
Turnout		12,518	67.44	–
Eligible voters		18,563		
Conservative hold		Swing		–19.54
Source: Library of Parliament

Canadian federal by-election, October 27, 1919 On Simon Tolmie being appointed Minister of Agriculture
Party	Candidate	Votes	%	±%
Government (Unionist)	Simon Fraser Tolmie	7,219	58.67	–19.62
Independent	Thomas Albert Barnard	5,085	41.33	–
Total valid votes		12,304	100.00	
Total rejected ballots		–		
Turnout		12,304	–	–
Eligible voters				
Government (Unionist) hold		Swing		–30.48
Source: Library of Parliament

1917 Canadian federal election
Party	Candidate	Votes	%	±%
Government (Unionist)	Simon Fraser Tolmie	11,365	78.29	+26.51
Opposition (Laurier Liberals)	Stuart Alexander Henderson	2,601	17.92	–24.96
Unknown	Albert Samuel Wells	551	3.80	–
Total valid votes		14,517	100.00	
Total rejected ballots		–		
Turnout		14,517	121.45	+55.50
Eligible voters		11,953		
Government (Unionist) hold		Swing		+25.74
Source: Library of Parliament

1911 Canadian federal election
Party	Candidate	Votes	%	±%
Conservative	George Henry Barnard	2,816	51.78	+1.63
Liberal	William Templeman	2,332	42.88	–6.97
Socialist	Gordon Brown	290	5.33	–
Total valid votes		5,438	100.00	
Total rejected ballots		–		
Turnout		5,438	65.95	+1.14
Eligible voters		8,246		
Conservative hold		Swing		+4.30
Source: Library of Parliament

1908 Canadian federal election
Party	Candidate	Votes	%	±%
Conservative	George Henry Barnard	2,179	50.15	+18.62
Liberal	William Templeman	2,166	49.85	–7.29
Total valid votes		4,345	100.00	
Total rejected ballots		–		
Turnout		4,345	64.81	–
Eligible voters		6,704		
Conservative gain from Liberal		Swing		+12.96
Source: Library of Parliament

Canadian federal by-election, March 6, 1906 On the resignation of George Riley
Party	Candidate	Votes	%	±%
Liberal	William Templeman	1,553	57.14	+4.59
Conservative	John L. Beckwith	857	31.53	–5.49
Independent	W.H. Marcon	308	11.33	–
Total valid votes		2,718	100.00	
Total rejected ballots		–		
Turnout		2,718	–	
Eligible voters				
Liberal hold		Swing		+5.04
Source: Library of Parliament

1904 Canadian federal election
Party	Candidate	Votes	%	±%
Liberal	George Riley	1,692	52.55	–
Conservative	Edward Gawler Prior	1,192	37.02	–
Socialist	James C. Watters	336	10.43	–
Total valid votes		3,220	100.00	
Total rejected ballots		–		
Turnout		3,220	65.00	–
Eligible voters		4,954		
This riding was created from parts of the multi-member riding of Victoria, which elected a Liberal and a Conservative in the last election. George Riley was one of the incumbents.
Source: Library of Parliament

== See also ==
- List of Canadian electoral districts
- Historical federal electoral districts of Canada
