= James Macdonnell (Canadian politician) =

Canadian lawyer and politician (1884–1973)

The Hon. James MacKerras Macdonnell

Member of the Canadian Parliament for Muskoka—Ontario
- In office 1945–1949
- Preceded by: Stephen Joseph Furniss
- Succeeded by: The electoral district was abolished in 1947.

Member of the Canadian Parliament for Greenwood
- In office 1949–1962
- Preceded by: John Ernest McMillin
- Succeeded by: Andrew Brewin

Personal details
- Born: 15 December 1884 Kingston, Ontario
- Died: 27 July 1973 (aged 88)
- Party: Progressive Conservative
- Cabinet: Minister Without Portfolio (1957-1959)

James MacKerras Macdonnell, PC CC MC (15 December 1884 – 27 July 1973) was a Canadian lawyer and parliamentarian.

== Biography ==
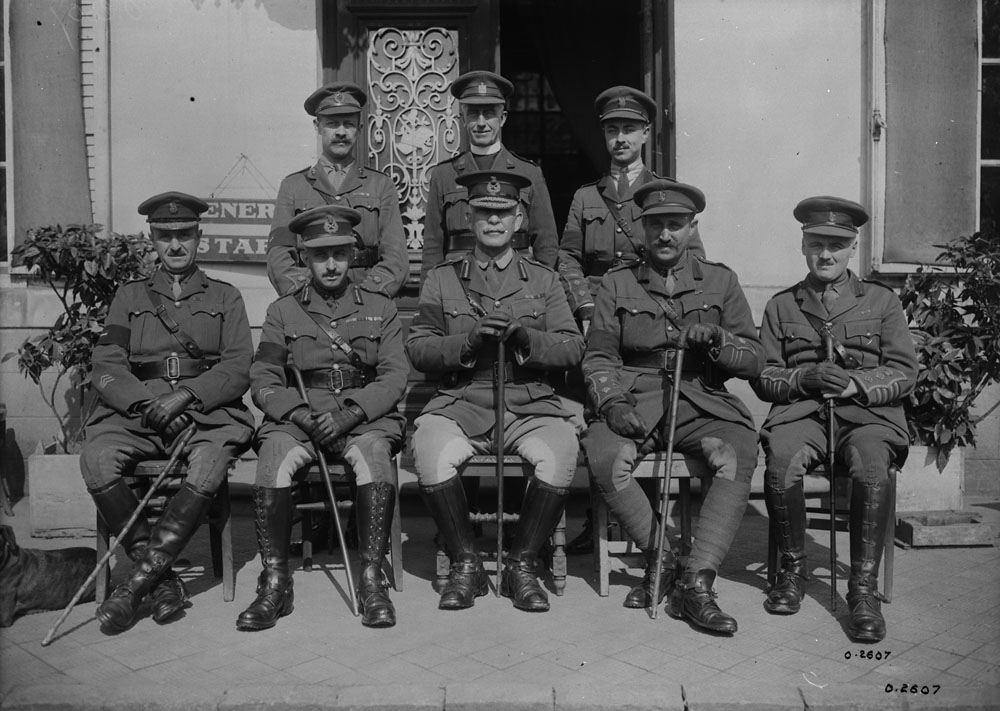
Major-General A. C. MacDonell and staff officers, 1st Canadian Division, sometime in 1918. (Front row, from left to right): Lieutenant-Colonel J. L. R. Parsons, Brigadier-General H. C. Thacker, Major-General A. C. Macdonnell, Lieutenant-Colonel J. Sutherland Brown, Colonel H. P. Wright. (Back row, from left to right): Lieutenant-Colonel H. F. H. Hertzberg, Hon. Lieutenant-Colonel F. G. Scott, Lieutenant J. M. Macdonnell.

He was born in Kingston, Ontario, the son of George W. Macdonnell and Mary Louise Philips, he was a Master at St. Andrew's College from 1904 to 1914 before becoming a trust company officer. He enlisted with the Canadian Expeditionary Force on 24 September 1914 at Valcartier, Quebec. He was awarded an MC in the 1917 Birthday Honours.

== Career ==
Macdonnell was first elected to the House of Commons of Canada as a Progressive Conservative Party candidate in the 1945 federal election representing Muskoka—Ontario riding. He was defeated in the 1949 federal election, but returned to parliament later that year when he won a by-election held in the Toronto riding of Greenwood.

Following the 1957 federal election that returned the first Progressive Conservative government and the first Tory government since the Great Depression, the new Prime Minister of Canada, John Diefenbaker, named Macdonnell to Cabinet as a minister without portfolio. He resigned from Cabinet on 8 August 1959 for health reasons and was defeated in the 1962 federal election by Andrew Brewin of the New Democratic Party.

Macdonnell was appointed a Companion of the Order of Canada in 1967 for "services as a parliamentarian".
