= James Fell (politician) =

James Fell (October 15, 1821 – December 8, 1890) was an English-born merchant and political figure in British Columbia. He served as mayor of Victoria, British Columbia from 1885 to 1887.

He was born at Muncaster Head, Cumberland and apprenticed in the grocery business. He was employed in London and then in Liverpool, where he later established a tea wholesale business. Around 1858, he went to Victoria, where he established a spice and coffee business in partnership with John Finlayson. The business expanded into general groceries. That business failed in 1868 and Fell established his own business. He ran unsuccessfully for a seat in the Canadian House of Commons in 1882. Fell was elected mayor for two terms, choosing not to run again in 1888. He served 14 years on the local school board. Fell helped establish the first Mechanics' Institute in Victoria and served as a trustee of the Royal Jubilee Hospital.
