= David Anderson (British Columbia politician) =

Canadian cabinet minister & rower (born 1937)

The Honourable David A. Anderson PC OC OBC
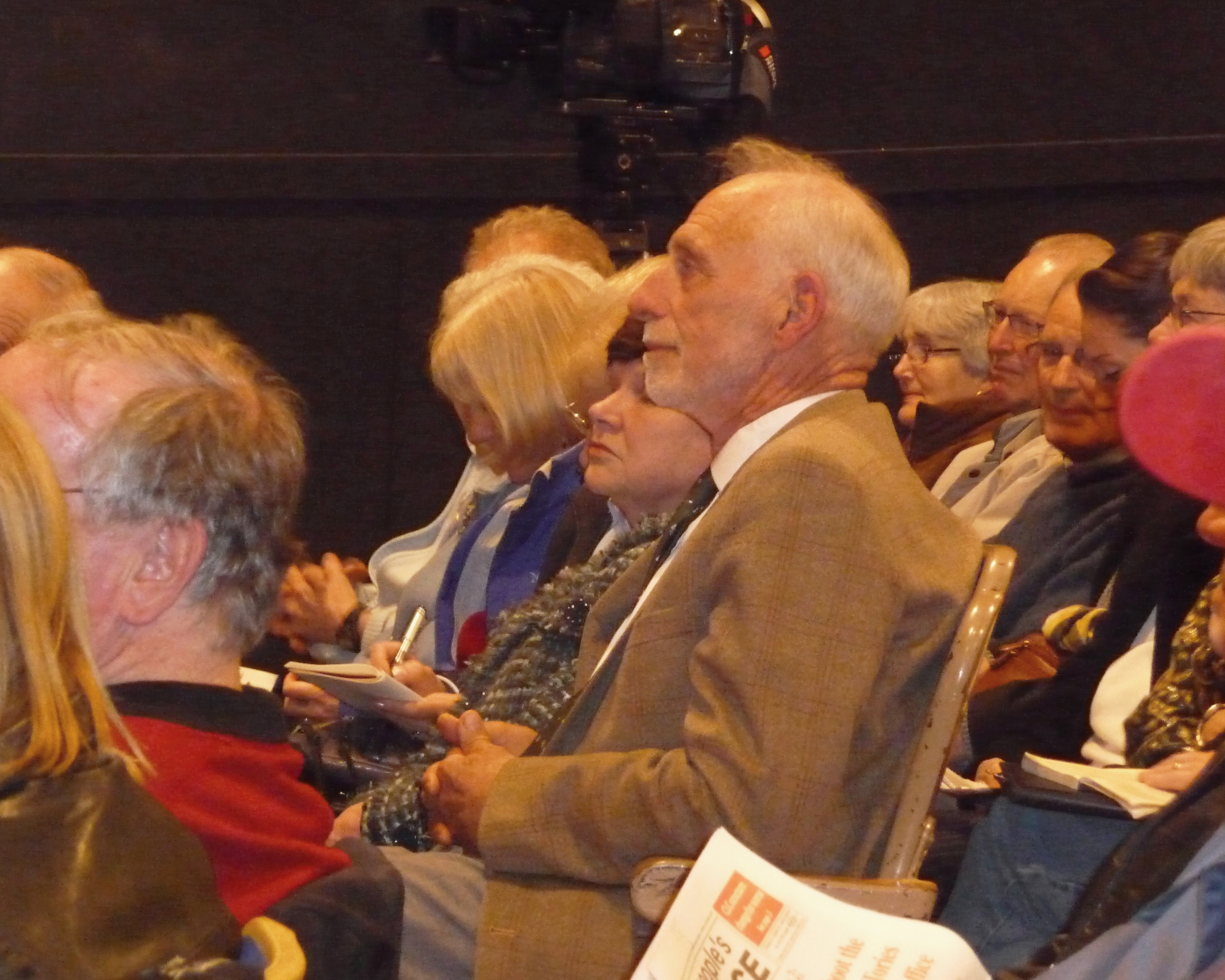
- Anderson in 2011

Minister of the Environment
- In office August 3, 1999 – July 20, 2004
- Prime Minister: Jean Chrétien; Paul Martin
- Preceded by: Christine Stewart
- Succeeded by: Stéphane Dion

Member of Parliament for Esquimalt—Saanich
- In office June 25, 1968 – July 24, 1972
- Preceded by: George Chatterton
- Succeeded by: Donald Munro

Member of Parliament for Victoria
- In office October 25, 1993 – January 23, 2006
- Preceded by: John Brewin
- Succeeded by: Denise Savoie

Member of the British Columbia Legislative Assembly for Victoria
- In office August 30, 1972 – December 11, 1975 Serving with Newell Morrison
- Preceded by: William Chant; Waldo McTavish Skillings
- Succeeded by: Charles Frederick Barber; Sam Bawlf

Personal details
- Born: August 16, 1937 (age 89) Victoria, British Columbia
- Party: Liberal
- Education: University of Victoria; University of British Columbia
- Profession: Journalist, lawyer
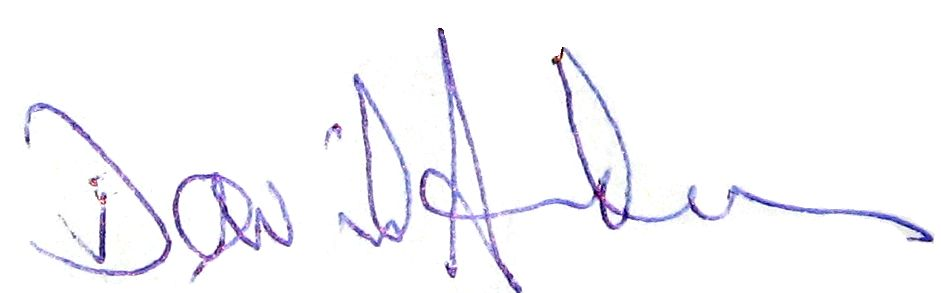
- Signature
- Sports career
Medal record
Men's rowing
Representing Canada
Olympic Games
Silver medal – second place	1960 Rome	Eight

David A. Anderson, PC OC OBC (born August 16, 1937) is a silver medal rower, academic, politician and former Canadian cabinet minister.

== Early life ==
Anderson was born in Victoria, British Columbia. He was educated at Victoria College, Aiglon College and at the University of British Columbia Faculty of Law; he graduated in 1962 with a LLB. During his UBC days Anderson won a silver medal for rowing in the 1960 Summer Olympics in Rome, and a silver medal in the 1959 Pan American Games in Chicago. He was also a pilot in the University Reserve of the Royal Canadian Air Force.

== Career ==
=== Civil servant ===
Anderson served as a foreign service officer in the Department of External Affairs between 1962 and 1968. His posts included Indochina (International Supervisory And Truce Commissions) 1963–1964, Assistant Canadian Trade Commissioner in Hong Kong, 1964–1967, and China Desk Officer in Ottawa 1967–1968. In Hong Kong, Anderson attended the Institute of Oriental Studies of the University of Hong Kong and obtained the British Foreign Officer Higher Standard Certificate in Mandarin.

=== Member of Parliament ===
He was elected Liberal MP for the constituency of Esquimalt—Saanich on Vancouver Island in the 1968 federal election. Four years later he switched to provincial politics, and was elected leader of the provincial Liberal Party (April 1972), then the third party in the provincial legislature with 5 out of 55 seats.

=== Member of the Legislative Assembly ===
Although elected himself in the 1972 election, representing the constituency of Victoria, the Liberal Party did not increase its seat total. Anderson served as Member of the Legislative Assembly until his defeat in December 1975.

During this period of elected office Anderson was prominent in representing Canadian concerns over offshore oil drilling, pipeline developments in Northern Canada, and oil tanker traffic between Alaska and the Lower 48 states.

=== Academia ===
Between 1976 and 1984, Anderson worked as an environmental consultant and adjunct professor at the University of Victoria's School of Administration, where he taught in the fields of constitutional and administrative law, and environmental policy. His environmental work focused on coastal and wetland protection and marine pollution from oil exploration and transportation.

Anderson was appointed as a member of the Immigration Appeal Board for a 10-year term in 1984. He served from March 1, 1984, until December 31, 1988, when the board was dissolved.

=== Member of Parliament ===
In the 1993 federal general election to the 35th Canadian Parliament Anderson re-entered elected politics. He was elected MP for Victoria and retained this position for three subsequent elections, ending when he retired from politics in January 2006. During this period, he served in the cabinet of Prime Minister Jean Chrétien as Minister of National Revenue (1993–1995), Minister of Transport (1995–1997), Minister of Fisheries and Oceans (1997–1999) and Minister of the Environment (1999–2006). He also was appointed the regional political minister for British Columbia, which he retained until 2002.

Anderson's time in the fisheries portfolio was marked by considerable controversy with the commercial fishing industry as he worked for strict conservation measures to protect fish stocks. These measures included a complete ban on the killing of Coho salmon. After six years of previous failures, he succeeded in getting an agreement with the United States under the Pacific Salmon Treaty to conserve salmon stocks and to end the destructive competitive fishing by the US and Canadian commercial fleets.

In the cabinet shuffle of 1999 midway through the 36th Canadian Parliament, Chrétien appointed Anderson Environment Minister. He served in that post for the following five years, making him the longest serving Canadian environment minister. In this period Anderson's work largely centered on the Rio Summit conventions on biodiversity and climate change.

Anderson implemented the Government of Canada Action Plan 2000 on Climate Change in tandem with Paul Martin's 2000 Canadian federal budget.

Anderson retained his seat in the 37th Canadian Parliament and was successful in getting the Species at Risk Act passed by Parliament and signed into law (2004). and, despite strong objections from the governments of Saskatchewan, Alberta and Ontario and the federal Official Opposition, in securing Canadian ratification of the Kyoto Protocol in December 2002. Other initiatives involved improving air and water quality and established improved federal provincial cooperation on environmental issues.

In international work, Anderson was the first Canadian elected as president of the governing council of the United Nations Environment Programme, a post he held for two years. He took a prominent part in the G8 and OECD Environment Minister's meetings. Anderson was dropped from cabinet by Prime Minister Paul Martin in 2004 and did not run in the 2006 election.

=== Retirement from politics ===
In February 2007, he was named director of the Guelph Institute for the Environment, from which he retired in 2010.

== Awards ==
Anderson has received a number of environmental awards, including the John Fraser Award for Environmental Achievement from the Sierra Club of Canada (2005), the Dr. Andrew Thompson Award from West Coast Environmental Law for his lifetime contributions to the environment and sustainability in British Columbia (2004), and the 50th anniversary International Conservation Award (1998) from the Atlantic Salmon Federation. He is an honorary director of the West Coast Environmental Law and its Research Foundation.

He was awarded an honorary doctoral degree in laws by the University of Victoria in 2007, and an honorary doctorate of science from Wilfrid Laurier University in 2009. He was appointed an Officer of the Order of Canada in 2010 and named to the Order of British Columbia in 2018.

== Family ==
Anderson is married with two children.

== Archives ==
There is a David Anderson fonds at Library and Archives Canada.
