= Kyoto Protocol and government action =

International treaty

The Kyoto Protocol was an international treaty which extended the 1992 United Nations Framework Convention on Climate Change. A number of governments across the world took a variety of actions.

== Annex I ==
In total, Annex I Parties managed a cut of 3.3% in greenhouse gas (GHG) emissions between 1990 and 2004 (UNFCCC, 2007, p. 11). In 2007, projections indicated rising emissions of 4.2% between 1990 and 2010. This projection assumed that no further mitigation action would be taken. The reduction in the 1990s was driven significantly by economic restructuring in the economies-in-transition (EITs. See Kyoto Protocol § Intergovernmental Emissions Trading for the list of EITs). Emission reductions in the EITs had little to do with climate change policy (Carbon Trust, 2009, p. 24). Some reductions in Annex I emissions have occurred due to policy measures, such as promoting energy efficiency (UNFCCC, 2007, p. 11).

=== Australia ===
On the change of government following the election in November 2007, Prime Minister Kevin Rudd signed the ratification immediately after assuming office on 3 December 2007, just before the meeting of the UN Framework Convention on Climate Change; it took effect in March 2008. Australia's target is to limit its emissions to 8% above their 1990 level over the 2008–2012 period, i.e., their average emissions over the 2008–2012 period should be kept below 108% of their 1990 level (IEA, 2005, p. 51). According to the Australian government, Australia should meet its Kyoto target (IEA, 2005, p. 56; DCCEE, 2010).

When he was in the opposition, Rudd commissioned Ross Garnaut to report on the economic effects of reducing greenhouse gas emissions. The report was submitted to the Australian government on 30 September 2008.

The policy of the Rudd government contrasts with that of the former Australian government, which refused to ratify the agreement on the ground that following the protocol would be costly.

==== Policy ====
Australia's position, under Prime Minister John Howard, was that it did not intend to ratify the treaty (IEA, 2005, p. 51). The justification for this was that:

- the treaty did not cover 70% of global emissions;
- developing countries are excluded from emission limitations;
- and the-then largest GHG emitter, the US, had not ratified the treaty.

The Howard government did intend to meet its Kyoto target, but without ratification (IEA, 2005, p. 51).

As part of the 2004 budget, A$1.8 billion was committed towards its climate change strategy. A$700 million was directed towards low-emission technologies (IEA, 2005, p. 56). The Howard government, along with the United States, agreed to sign the Asia Pacific Partnership on Clean Development and Climate at the ASEAN regional forum on 28 July 2005. Furthermore, the state of New South Wales (NSW) commenced the NSW greenhouse gas abatement scheme. This mandatory scheme of greenhouse gas emissions trading commenced on 1 January 2003 and is currently in trial by the state government in NSW alone. Notably, this scheme allows accredited certificate providers to trade emissions from households in the state. As of 2006, the scheme is still in place despite the outgoing Prime Minister's clear dismissal of emissions trading as a credible solution to climate change.

Following the example of NSW, the national emissions trading scheme (NETS) has been established as an initiative of state and territory governments of Australia, all of which have Labor Party governments, except Western Australia. The purpose of NETS is to establish an intra-Australian carbon trading scheme to coordinate policy among regions. As the Constitution of Australia does not refer specifically to environmental matters (apart from water), the allocation of responsibility is to be resolved at a political level. In the later years of the Howard administration (1996–2007), the states governed by the Labor took steps to establish a NETS (a) to take action in a field where there were few mandatory federal steps and (b) as a means of facilitating ratification of the Kyoto Protocol by the incoming Labor government.

In May 2009, Kevin Rudd delayed and changed the carbon pollution reduction scheme:

- the scheme would begin in 2011/2012, a year later than initially scheduled (it had been scheduled to begin on 1 July 2010);
- there would be one-year fixed price of A$10 per permit in 2011/2012 (previously, price was to under the price cap of $40);
- there would be an unlimited amount of permits available from the government in the first year (previously, estimated 300 million tons of carbon dioxide (CO_{2}) was to be auctioned off);
- a higher percentage of permits would be handed out, rather than auctioned off (previously, 60% or 90% of permits were to be handed out);
- compensation would be canceled in 2010/2011 and reduced in 2011/2012;
- households can reduce their carbon footprint by buying and retiring permits into an Australian carbon trust (previously, no such scheme was included);
- subject to an international agreement, Australia would commit to a reduction of 25% from the 2000 level by 2020 (previously, there was to be a reduction of 15%);
- 5% out of the 25% reduction could be achieved by the government purchase of international off-sets (previously, no such scheme was included).

Greenpeace

Greenpeace has called clause 3.7 of the Kyoto Protocol the "Australia clause" on the ground that it unfairly made Australia a major beneficiary. The clause allows annex 1 countries with a high rate of land clearing in 1990 to set the level in that year as a base. Greenpeace argues that since Australia had an extremely high level of land clearing in 1990, Australia's "baseline" was unusually high compared to other countries.

==== Emissions ====
In 2002, Australia represented about 1.5% of global greenhouse gas (GHG) emissions (IEA, 2005, p. 51). Over the 1990–2002 period, Australia's gross emissions rose by 22%, which was surpassed by only four other International Energy Agency (IEA) members (IEA, 2005, p. 54). This was in large part due to economic growth. Net emissions (including changes in land-use and forestry) increased by 1.3% over this period. In 2005, Australia's GHG emissions (Note: Estimates by MNP (2007) are for the GHG emissions from fossil fuel use and cement production. Calculations are for carbon dioxide (CO_{2}), methane (CH_{4}), nitrous oxide (N_{2}O) and fluor containing gases (the F-gases HFCs, PFCs and SF_{6}). These estimates are subject to large uncertainties regarding CO_{2} emissions from deforestation; and the per country emissions of other GHGs (e.g., methane). There are also other large uncertainties that mean that small differences between countries are not significant. CO_{2} emissions from the decay of remaining biomass after biomass burning/deforestation are not included.) made up 1.2% of the global total (MNP, 2007).

Per-capita emissions are a country's total emissions divided by its population (Banuri et al., 1996, p. 95). In 2005, per capita emissions in Australia were 26.3 tons per capita (MNP, 2007).

=== Canada ===
On 17 December 2002, Canada ratified the treaty that came into force in February 2005, requiring it to reduce emissions to 6% below 1990 levels during the 2008–2012 commitment period (IEA, 2004, p. 52). Under Canada's Kyoto Protocol Implementation Act (KPIA), the National Round Table on the Environment and the Economy (NRTEE) is required to respond to the government's climate change plans (Canadian Government, 2010). In the assessment of NRTEE (2008), "Canada is not pursuing a policy objective of meeting the Kyoto Protocol emissions reductions targets. [...] [The] projected emissions profile described in the 2008 [government plan] would leave Canada in non-compliance with the Kyoto Protocol."

On 13 December 2011, a day after the end of the 2011 United Nations Climate Change Conference, Canada's environment minister, Peter Kent, announced that Canada would withdraw from the Kyoto Protocol.

==== Emissions ====
In 2001, Canadian emissions had grown by more than 20% above their 1990 level (IEA, 2004, p. 49). High population and economic growth, added to the expansion of CO_{2} emissions-intensive sectors, such as oil sand production, were responsible for this growth in emissions. By 2004, CO_{2} emissions had risen to 27% above the level in 1990. In 2006 they were down to 21.7% above 1990 levels.

In 2005, Canada's GHG emissions made up 2% of the global total (MNP, 2007). Per capita emissions in Canada were 23.2 tons per capita.

Projections

In 2004, Canada's emission projections under a business-as-usual scenario (i.e., predicted emissions should policy not be changed) indicated a rise of 33% on the 1990 level by 2010 (IEA, 2004, p. 52). This is a gap of approximately 240 Mt between its target and projected emissions.

==== Politics ====
When the treaty was ratified in 2002, numerous polls showed support for the Kyoto protocol at around 70%. Despite strong public support, there was still some opposition, particularly by the Canadian Alliance, a precursor to the governing Conservative Party, some business groups, and energy concerns, using arguments similar to those being voiced in the U.S. In particular, there was a fear that since U.S. companies would not be affected by the Kyoto Protocol, Canadian companies would be at a disadvantage. In 2005, a "war of words" was ongoing, primarily between Alberta, Canada's primary oil and gas producer, and the federal government.

Between 1998 and 2004, Canada committed $3.7 billion towards investment on climate change activities (IEA, 2004, p. 52). The Climate Change Plan for Canada, released in November 2002, described priority areas for climate change policy.

In January 2006, a Conservative minority government under Stephen Harper was elected, who previously has expressed opposition to Kyoto, and in particular to the international emission trading. Rona Ambrose, who replaced Stéphane Dion as the environment minister, has since endorsed and expressed interests in some types of emission trading. On 25 April 2006, Ambrose announced that Canada would have no chance of meeting its targets under Kyoto, but would look to participate in the Asia-Pacific Partnership on Clean Development and Climate sponsored by the U.S. "We've been looking at the Asia-Pacific Partnership for a number of months now because the key principles around [it] are very much in line with where our government wants to go," Ambrose told reporters. On 2 May 2006, it was reported that the funding to meet the Kyoto standards had been cut, while the Harper government develops a new plan to take its place. As the co-chair of the UN Climate Change Conference in Nairobi in November 2006, the Canadian government received criticism from environmental groups and other governments for its position. On 4 January 2007, Rona Ambrose moved from the Ministry of the Environment to become Minister of Intergovernmental Affairs. The environment portfolio went to John Baird, the former President of the Treasury Board.

The federal government has introduced legislation to set mandatory emissions targets for industry, but they will not take effect until 2012, with a benchmark date of 2006 as opposed to Kyoto's 1990. The government has since begun working with opposition parties to modify the legislation.

A private member's bill was put forth by Pablo Rodriguez, Liberal, to force the government to "ensure that Canada meets its global climate change obligations under the Kyoto Protocol." With the support of the Liberals, the New Democratic Party and the Bloc Québécois, and with the current minority situation, the bill passed the House of Commons on 14 February 2007 with a vote of 161 to 113. The Senate passed the bill, and it received royal assent on 22 June 2007. However, the government, as promised, has largely ignored the bill, which was to force the government 60 days to form a detailed plan, citing economic reasons.

In May 2007, the Friends of the Earth sued the federal government for failing to meet the Kyoto Protocol obligations to cut greenhouse gas emissions. The obligations were based on a clause in the Canadian Environmental Protection Act that requires Ottawa to "prevent air pollution that violates an international agreement binding on Canada". Canada's obligation to the treaty began in 2008.

Regardless of the federal policy, some provinces are pursuing policies to restrain emissions, including Quebec, Ontario, British Columbia and Manitoba as part of the Western Climate Initiative. Since 2003 Alberta operates a carbon offset program.

Environmental groups

Environmental groups in Canada are working together to demand that Canadian politicians take the threat of climate change seriously and make the necessary changes to ensure the safety and health of future generations. Participating groups have created a petition called KYOTOplus, on which signatories commit to the following acts:
• set a national target to cut greenhouse gas emissions at least 25 per cent from 1990 levels by 2020;
• implement an effective national plan to reach this target and help developing countries adapt and build low-carbon economies; and
• adopt a strengthened second phase of the Kyoto Protocol at the United Nations climate change conference at Copenhagen, Denmark in December 2009.

KYOTOplus is a national, non-partisan, petition-centered campaign for urgent federal government action on climate change. There are over fifty partner organizations, including: Climate Action Network Canada, Sierra Club Canada, Sierra Youth Coalition, Oxfam Canada, the Canadian Youth Climate Coalition, Greenpeace Canada, KAIROS: Canadian Ecumenical Justice Initiatives and the David Suzuki Foundation.

==== Withdrawal of Canada ====
On 13 December 2011, Canada's environment minister, Peter Kent, announced that Canada would withdraw from the Kyoto Protocol. The announcement was a day after the end of the 2011 United Nations Climate Change Conference (the 17th Conference of the Parties, or "COP 17"). At COP 17, the representatives of the Canadian government gave their support to a new international climate change agreement that "includes commitments from all major emitters." Canadian representatives also stated that "the Kyoto Protocol is not where the solution lies – it is an agreement that covers fewer than 30 per cent of global emissions (...)."

The Canadian government invoked Canada's legal right to formally withdraw from the Kyoto Protocol on 12 December 2011. Canada was committed to cutting its greenhouse emissions to 6% below 1990 levels by 2012, but in 2009 emissions were 17% higher than in 1990. Environment minister Peter Kent cited Canada's liability to "enormous financial penalties" under the treaty unless it withdrew. He also suggested that the recently signed Durban agreement may provide an alternative way forward.

===== Commentary =====
Christiana Figueres, Executive Secretary of the UNFCCC, said that she regretted Canada's decision to withdraw from the Kyoto treaty, and that "[whether] or not Canada is a Party to the Kyoto Protocol, it has a legal obligation under the [UNFCCC] to reduce its emissions, and a moral obligation to itself and future generations to lead in the global effort."

Canada's decision received a mostly negative response from representatives of other ratifying countries. A spokesman for France's foreign ministry called the move "bad news for the fight against climate change." Japan's own environment minister, Goshi Hosono, urged Canada to stay in the protocol. Some countries, including India, were worried that Canada's decision might jeopardise future conferences.

A spokesperson for the island nation of Tuvalu, significantly threatened by rising sea levels, accused Canada of an "act of sabotage" against his country. Australian government minister Greg Combet, however, defended the decision, saying that it did not mean Canada would not continue to "play its part in global efforts to tackle climate change". China called Canada's decision to withdraw from the Kyoto Protocol "regrettable" and said that it went against the efforts of the international community. Canada's move came days after climate-change negotiators met to hammer-out a global deal in Durban, South Africa.

Foreign Ministry spokesman Liu Weimin expressed China's dismay at the news that Canada had pulled out of the Kyoto Protocol. Noting that the timing was particularly bad, because negotiators at the just-concluded Durban conference made what he described as important progress on the issue of the Kyoto Protocol's second commitment period.

The UK's Guardian newspaper reported on Canada's decision to withdraw from the Kyoto treaty. According to the Guardian, "Canada's inaction was blamed by some on its desire to protect the lucrative but highly polluting exploitation of tar sands, the second biggest oil reserve in the world."

=== Europe ===
==== European Union ====
On 31 May 2002, all fifteen then-members of the European Union deposited the relevant ratification paperwork at the UN. Under the Kyoto Protocol, the 15 member countries that were Member States of the EU when the Protocol was agreed (EU-15) are committed to reducing their collective GHG emissions in the period 2008–12 to 8% below levels in 1990 (EEA, 2009, p. 9). All but one EU Member State (Austria) anticipate that they will meet their commitments under the Kyoto Protocol (EEA, 2009, pp. 11–12).

Denmark has committed itself to reducing its emissions by 21%. On 10 January 2007, the European Commission announced plans for a European Union energy policy that included a unilateral 20% reduction in GHG emissions by 2020.

The EU has consistently been one of the major nominal supporters of the Kyoto Protocol, negotiating hard to get wavering countries on board.

In December 2002, the EU created an emissions trading system (EU ETS) in an effort to meet these tough targets. Quotas were introduced in six key industries: energy, steel, cement, glass, brick making, and paper/cardboard. There are also fines for member nations that fail to meet their obligations, starting at €40/ton of carbon dioxide in 2005, and rising to €100/ton in 2008.

The position of the EU is not without controversy in Protocol negotiations, however. One criticism is that, rather than reducing 8%, all the EU member countries should cut 15% as the EU insisted a uniform target of 15% for other developed countries during the negotiation while allowing itself to share a big reduction in the former East Germany to meet the 15% goal for the entire EU. According to Aldy et al. (2003, p. 7), the "hot air" in German and UK targets allows the EU to meet its Kyoto target at low cost.

Both the EU (as the European Community) and its member states are signatories to the Kyoto treaty. Greece, however was excluded from the Kyoto Protocol on Earth Day (22 April 2008) due to unfulfilled commitment of creating the adequate mechanisms of monitoring and reporting emissions, which is the minimum obligation, and delivering false reports by having no other data to report. A United Nations committee has decided to reinstate Greece in the emissions-trading system of the Kyoto Protocol after a seven-month suspension (on 15 November).

Emissions

In 2005, the EU-27 made up 11% of total global GHG emissions (MNP, 2007). Per capita emissions were 10.6 tons per capita.

Transport CO_{2} emissions in the EU grew by 32% between 1990 and 2004 The share of transport in CO_{2} emissions was 21% in 1990, but by 2004 this had grown to 28%. In 2017, 27% of the EU-28 greenhouse gas emissions came from transportation with 5% of these emissions coming from international aviation and maritime emissions, this was a 2.2% overall increase in this sector from the year before.

===== France =====
France's Kyoto commitment is to cap its emissions at their 1990 levels (Stern, 2007, p. 456). The country has a national objective to reduce emissions by 25% from their 1990 levels by 2020, and a long-term target to reduce emissions 75–80% by 2050.

In 2002, France's total GHG emissions were roughly equivalent to 1990 levels, and 6.4% below 1990 levels when accounting for sink enhancements, as allowed under the Protocol (IEA, 2004, p. 58). In 2001, France's per capita emissions were 6.32 tCO_{2} per capita. Only five other IEA countries had lower levels (p. 59). France's CO_{2} intensity of GDP (energy-related CO_{2} emissions per gross domestic production (GDP)) was the fifth-lowest among all IEA countries.

In 2004, France shut down its last coal mine, and now gets 80% of its electricity from nuclear power and therefore has relatively low CO_{2} emissions, except for its transport sector.

===== Germany =====
Germany has taken on a target under the Kyoto Protocol to reduce its GHG emissions by 21% compared with the base year 1990 (and in some cases, 1995) (IEA, 2007, pp. 44–45). Through 2004, Germany reduced its total GHG emissions by 17.4% (p. 45). Including the effects of land-use change increases this to 18.5%. The two main approaches Germany has used to meet its Kyoto target are reductions from the EU ETS, and reductions from the transport, household, and small business sectors (p. 51).

Germany's progress towards its Kyoto target benefits from its reunification in 1990 (Liverman, 2008, p. 12). This is because of the reduction in emissions of East Germany after the fall of the Berlin Wall. CO_{2} emissions in Germany fell 12% between 1990 and 1995 (Barrett, 1998, p. 34). Germany reduced gas emissions by 22.4% between 1990 and 2008.

On 28 June 2006, the German government announced that it would exempt its coal industry from requirements under the E.U. internal emission trading system. Claudia Kemfert, an energy professor at the German Institute for Economic Research in Berlin said, "For all its support for a clean environment and the Kyoto Protocol, the cabinet decision is very disappointing. The energy lobbies have played a big role in this decision." However, Germany's voluntary commitment to reduce CO_{2} emissions by 21% from the level in 1990 has practically been met, because emission has already been reduced by 19%. Germany is thus contributing 75% of the 8% reduction promised by the E.U.

===== United Kingdom =====
According to the UK government, projections indicate that the UK's GHG emissions will fall about 23% below base year levels by 2010 (DECC, 2009, p. 3). The UK's Kyoto target of a 12.5% reduction in emissions on their 1990 level (Stern, 2007, p. 456) benefits from the country's relatively high emissions in that year (1990) (Liverman, 2008, p. 12). Compared to their 1990 level, UK CO_{2} emissions in 1995 were lower by 7%. This was despite the fact that the UK had not adopted a radical policy to reduce emissions (Barrett, 1998, p. 34).

Since 1990, the UK has privatized its energy-consuming industries, which has helped to increase their energy efficiency (US Senate, 2005, p. 218). The UK has also liberalized its electricity and gas systems, resulting in a change from coal to gas (the "dash for gas"), which has lowered emissions. It is estimated that these changes have contributed about half of the total observed reductions in UK CO_{2} emissions.

The energy policy of the United Kingdom fully endorses goals for carbon dioxide emissions reduction and has committed to proportionate reduction in national emissions on a phased basis. The U.K. is a signatory to the Kyoto Protocol.

On 13 March 2007, a draft Climate Change Bill was published after cross-party pressure over several years, led by environmental groups. Informed by the Energy White Paper 2003, the bill aims to achieve a mandatory reduction of 60% in the carbon emission from the 1990 level by 2050, with an intermediate target of between 26% and 32% by 2020. On 26 November 2008, the Climate Change Act became law with a target of 80% reduction over 1990. The U.K. is the first country to ratify a law with such a long-range and significant carbon reduction target.

The U.K. currently appears on course to meet its Kyoto limitation for the basket of greenhouse gases, assuming the government is able to curb CO_{2} emissions between 2007 and 2008 to 2012. Although the overall greenhouse gas emissions in the UK have fallen, annual net carbon dioxide emission has increased by about 2% since the Labour Party came to power in 1997. As a result, it now seems highly unlikely that the government will be able to honour its pledge to cut carbon dioxide emissions by 20% from the 1990 level by 2010, unless an immediate and drastic action is taken under after the ratification of the Climate Change Bill.

==== Norway ====
Norway's commitment under the Kyoto Protocol is to restrict its increase of GHGs to 1% above the 1990 level by the commitment period 2008–2012 (IEA, 2005, p. 46). In 2003, total emissions were 9% above the 1990 level. 99% of Norway's electricity from CO_{2}-free hydropower. Oil and gas extraction activities contributed 74% to the total increase of CO_{2} in the period 1990–2003.

The Norwegian government (2009, p. 11) projected a rise in GHG emissions of 15% from 1990 to 2010. Measures and policies adopted after autumn 2008 are not included in the baseline scenario (i.e., the predicted emissions that would occur without additional policy measures) for this projection (p. 55).

Between 1990 and 2007, Norway's greenhouse gas emissions increased by 12%. As well as directly reducing their own greenhouse gas emissions, Norway's idea for carbon neutrality is to finance reforestation in China, a legal provision of the Kyoto protocol.

=== Japan ===
Japan ratified the Kyoto Protocol in June 2002, and has committed to reducing its GHG emissions by 6% below their 1990 levels (IEA, 2008, p. 47). Estimates for 2005 showed that Japan's emissions were 7.8% higher than in the base year.

To meet its Kyoto target, the government aims for a 0.6% reduction in domestic GHG emissions compared with the base year. It also aims to meet part of its target through a forest sink of 13 million tonnes of carbon, which is equivalent to a 3.8% cut. Another reduction of 1.6% is aimed for using the Kyoto flexible mechanisms.

According to IEA (2008, p. 45), Japan is a world leader in the field of sustainable energy policies. The legislation guiding Japan's efforts to reduce emissions is the Kyoto Protocol Target Achievement Plan, passed in 2005 and later amended (p. 47). This Plan includes about 60 policies and measures. Most of these policies and measures are related to improved energy efficiency.

When measured using market exchange rates, Japan's energy intensity in terms of total primary energy supply per unit of GDP is the lowest among IEA countries (p. 53). Measured in terms of purchasing power parity, its energy intensity is one of the lowest.

Emissions

In 2005, Japan's energy-related CO_{2} per capita emissions were 9.5 metric tons per head of population (World Bank, 2010, p. 362). Japan's total energy-related CO_{2} emissions made up 4.57% of global emissions in this year. Over the period 1850–2005, Japan's cumulative energy-related CO_{2} emissions were 46.1 billion metric tons.

=== New Zealand ===
New Zealand signed the Kyoto Protocol to the UNFCCC on 22 May 1998 and ratified it on 19 December 2002. New Zealand's target is to limit net greenhouse gas emissions for the five-year 2008–2012 commitment period to five times the 1990 gross volume of GHG emissions. New Zealand may meet this target by either reducing emissions or by obtaining carbon credits from the international market or from domestic carbon sinks. The credits may be any of the Kyoto units; Assigned amount units (AAU), removal units (RMU), Emission Reduction Units (ERU) and Certified Emission Reduction (CER) units. In April 2012, the projection of New Zealand's net Kyoto position was a surplus of 23.1 million emissions units valued at NZ$189 million, based on an international carbon price of 5.03 Euro per tonne. On 9 November 2012, the New Zealand Government announced it would make climate pledges for the period from 2013 to 2020 under the UNFCCC process instead of adopting a binding limit under a second commitment period of the Kyoto Protocol.

At the 2012 United Nations Climate Change Conference New Zealand was awarded two 'Fossil of the Day' awards for "actively hampering international progress". The New Zealand Youth Delegation heavily criticised the New Zealand government, saying New Zealand's decision not to sign up for a second commitment period under the Kyoto Protocol was "embarrassing, short-sighted and irresponsible".

=== Russia ===
Under the Kyoto Protocol, the Russian Federation committed itself to keeping its GHG emissions at the base year level during the first Kyoto commitment period from 2008–2012 (UNFCCC, 2009, p. 3). UNFCCC (2009, p. 11) reported that Russian GHG emissions were projected to decline by 28% relative to base year level by 2010.

The process of economic transition in the Russian Federation was accompanied by a sharp decline in its GDP in the 1990s (p. 4). Since 1998, the Russian Federation has experienced strong economic growth. In the period 1990–2006, emissions decreased by 33%. The difference between GDP and emissions was mainly driven by:

- shifts in the structure of the economy;
- reduced share of oil and coal in the primary energy supply and an increase in the share of natural gas and nuclear power;
- a decline in the transport and agriculture sectors;
- a decrease in population;
- an increase in energy efficiency.

Russia accounts for about two-thirds of the expected emission savings from Joint Implementation (JI) projects by 2012 (Carbon Trust, 2009, p. 21). These savings are projected to amount to 190 megatonnes of carbon dioxide equivalent (CO_{2}-eq) over the 2008–2012 period (p. 23).

Politics

The interest of the Russian government in accessing the Kyoto Protocol was associated with the G-8 meeting in Genoa in 2001, where the heads of state of the eight countries had an emotional discussion about the need to ratify the Kyoto Protocol. Russian President Vladimir Putin, who was neutral in the discussion, proposed to organise a conference where politicians and scientists representatives could discuss all issues related to the ratification of the Kyoto Protocol. This proposal was supported unanimously and in 2003 Russia hosted the World Conference on Climate Change.

Since 2001, Vladimir Putin had received a large number of appeals from the heads of foreign states about the need for Russia to ratify the Kyoto Protocol, so he instructed Andrey Illarionov to find out whether the ratification of the Kyoto Protocol was in Russia's national interest. Not fully trusting experts of Intergovernmental Panel on Climate Change, Andrey Illarionov decided to address the President of the Russian Academy of Sciences, Yury Osipov, and climatologist, Yuri Izrael, with a request to involve Russian leading scientists in the discussion of this issue. On May 17, 2004, Yury Osipov outlined his position on the adoption of the Kyoto Protocol by Vladimir Putin. Yury Osipov noted that during the discussion, scientists had the opinion that the Kyoto Protocol does not have a scientific basis and is not effective for achieving the final goal of the UN Framework Convention on Climate Change. If Russia would ratify the Kyoto Protocol, then it would be impossible for its economy to double the GDP.

Despite negative attitudes of scientists Vladimir Putin approved the treaty on 4 November 2004, and Russia officially notified the United Nations of its ratification on 18 November 2004. The issue of Russian ratification was particularly closely watched in the international community, as the accord was brought into force 90 days after Russian ratification (16 February 2005).

President Putin had earlier decided in favor of the protocol in September 2004, along with the Russian cabinet, against the opinion of the Russian Academy of Sciences, of the Ministry for Industry and Energy, and of the then-president's economic adviser, Andrey Illarionov, and in exchange for the EU's support for Russia's admission into the WTO. As anticipated, after this, ratification by the lower (22 October 2004) and upper house of parliament did not encounter any obstacles.

There is an ongoing scientific debate on whether Russia will actually gain from selling credits for unused AAUs.

=== United States ===
The United States has not ratified the Kyoto Protocol (IEA, 2007, p. 90). Doing so would have committed it to reduce GHG emissions by 7% below 1990 levels by 2012. Emissions of GHGs in the US increased by 16% between 1990 and 2005 (IEA, 2007, p. 83). In this period, the most substantial increase in volume were emissions from energy use, followed by industrial processes.

In 2002, the US government set a goal to reduce the GHG emissions of the US economy per unit of economic output (the emissions intensity of the economy) (IEA, 2007, p. 87). The set goal is to reduce the GHG intensity of the US economy by 18% by 2012. To achieve this, policy has focused on supporting energy research and development, including support for carbon capture and storage (CCS), renewables, methane capture and use, and nuclear power. The America's Climate Security Act of 2007, also more commonly referred to in the U.S. as the "Cap and trade Bill", was proposed for greater U.S. alignment with the Kyoto standards and goals.

==== Emissions ====
Between 2001–2007, growth in US CO_{2} emissions was only 3%, comparable with to that of IEA Europe, and lower than that of a number of other countries, some of which are parties to the Kyoto Protocol (IEA, 2007, p. 90). In 2005, the US made up 16% of global GHG emissions, and had per capita emissions of 24.1 tons of GHG per capita (MNP, 2007).

==== Politics ====
The United States (US), although a signatory to the Kyoto Protocol, has neither ratified nor withdrawn from the Protocol. The signature alone is merely symbolic, as the Kyoto Protocol is non-binding on the United States unless ratified.

===== Clinton administration =====
On 25 July 1997, before the Kyoto Protocol was finalized (although it had been fully negotiated, and a penultimate draft was finished), the US Senate unanimously passed by a 95–0 vote the Byrd–Hagel Resolution (S. Res. 98), which stated the sense of the Senate was that the United States should not be a signatory to any protocol that did not include binding targets and timetables for developing nations as well as industrialized nations or "would result in serious harm to the economy of the United States". On 12 November 1998, Vice President Al Gore symbolically signed the protocol. Both Gore and Senator Joseph Lieberman indicated that the protocol would not be acted upon in the Senate until there was participation by the developing nations. The Clinton Administration never submitted the protocol to the Senate for ratification.

The Clinton Administration released an economic analysis in July 1998, prepared by the Council of Economic Advisors, which concluded that with emissions trading among the annex B/annex I countries, and participation of key developing countries in the "Clean Development Mechanism"—which grants the latter business-as-usual emissions rates through 2012—the costs of implementing the Kyoto Protocol could be reduced as much as 60% from multiple estimates. Estimates of the cost of achieving the Kyoto Protocol carbon reduction targets in the United States, as compared by the Energy Information Administration (EIA), predicted losses to GDP of between 1.0% and 4.2% by 2010, reducing to between 0.5% and 2.0% by 2020. Some of these estimates assumed that action had been taken by 1998, and would be increased by delays in starting action.

===== Bush administration =====
Under the Presidency of George W. Bush, the US government recognized climate change as a serious environmental challenge (IEA, 2007, p. 87). The policy of the Bush administration was to reduce the GHG emissions of the US economy per unit of economic output (the emissions intensity of the economy). This policy allowed for absolute increases in emissions. The Bush administration viewed a policy to reduce absolute emissions as incompatible with continued economic growth. A number of states set state-level GHG targets, despite the absence of a federal level target.

President George W. Bush did not submit the treaty for Senate ratification based on the exemption granted to China (now the world's largest gross emitter of carbon dioxide, although emission is low per capita). Bush opposed the treaty because of the strain he believed the treaty would put on the economy; he emphasized the uncertainties that he believed were present in the scientific evidence. Furthermore, the U.S. was concerned with broader exemptions of the treaty. For example, the U.S. did not support the split between annex I countries and others.

At the G8 meeting in June 2005 administration officials expressed a desire for "practical commitments industrialized countries can meet without damaging their economies". According to those same officials, the United States is on track to fulfil its pledge to reduce its carbon intensity 18% by 2012. In 2002, the US National Environmental trust labelled carbon intensity, "a bookkeeping trick which allows the administration to do nothing about global warming while unsafe levels of emissions continue to rise." The United States has signed the Asia Pacific Partnership on Clean Development and Climate, a pact that allows those countries to set their goals for reducing greenhouse gas emissions individually, but with no enforcement mechanism. Supporters of the pact see it as complementing the Kyoto Protocol while being more flexible.

The Administration's position was not uniformly accepted in the US For example, economist Paul Krugman noted that the target 18% reduction in carbon intensity is still actually an increase in overall emissions. The White House came under criticism for downplaying reports that link human activity and greenhouse gas emissions to climate change and that a White House official, former oil industry advocate and ExxonMobil officer, Philip Cooney, watered down descriptions of climate research that had already been approved by government scientists, charges the White House denies. Critics point to the Bush administration's close ties to the oil and gas industries. In June 2005, State Department papers showed the administration thanking ExxonMobil executives for the company's "active involvement" in helping to determine climate change policy, including the US stance on Kyoto. Input from the business lobby group Global Climate Coalition was also a factor.

In 2002, Congressional researchers who examined the legal status of the Protocol advised that signature of the UNFCCC imposes an obligation to refrain from undermining the Protocol's object and purpose, and that while the President probably cannot implement the Protocol alone, Congress can create compatible laws on its own initiative.

===== Obama administration =====
President Barack Obama did not take any action with the senate that would change the position of the United States towards this protocol. When Obama was in Turkey in April 2009, he said that "it doesn't make sense for the United States to sign [the Kyoto Protocol] because [it] is about to end". At this time, two years and eleven months remained from the four-year commitment period.

===== States and local governments =====
The Framework Convention on Climate Change is a treaty negotiated between countries at the UN; thus individual states are not free to participate independently within this Protocol to the treaty. Nonetheless, several separate initiatives have started at the level of state or city. Eight Northeastern US states created the Regional Greenhouse Gas Initiative (RGGI), a state level emissions capping and trading program, using their own independently-developed mechanisms. Their first allowances were auctioned in November 2008.

- Participating states: Maine, New Hampshire, Vermont, Connecticut, New York, New Jersey, Delaware, Massachusetts, and Maryland (these states represent over 46 million people, 20% of the US population).
- Observer states and regions: Pennsylvania, District of Columbia, Rhode Island.

On 27 September 2006, California Governor Arnold Schwarzenegger signed into law the bill AB 32, also known as the Global Warming Solutions Act, establishing a timetable to reduce the state's greenhouse-gas emissions, which rank at 12th-largest in the world, by 25% by the year 2020. This law effectively puts California in line with the Kyoto limitations, but at a date later than the 2008–2012 Kyoto commitment period. A number of the features of the Californian system are similar to the Kyoto mechanisms, although the scope and targets are different. The parties in the Western Climate Initiative expect to be compatible with some or all of the Californian model.

As of 14 June 2009, 944 US cities in 50 states, the District of Columbia and Puerto Rico, representing over 80 million Americans support Kyoto after Mayor Greg Nickels of Seattle started a nationwide effort to get cities to agree to the protocol. On 29 October 2007, it was reported that Seattle met their target reduction in 2005, reducing their greenhouse gas emissions by 8 percent since 1990.

- Large participating cities: Albany; Albuquerque; Alexandria; Ann Arbor; Arlington; Atlanta; Austin; Baltimore; Berkeley; Boston; Charleston;Chattanooga; Chicago; Cleveland; Dallas; Denver; Des Moines; Erie; Fayetteville; Hartford; Honolulu; Indianapolis; Jersey City; Lansing; Las Vegas; Lexington; Lincoln; Little Rock; Los Angeles; Louisville; Madison; Miami; Milwaukee; Minneapolis; Nashville; New Orleans; New York City; Oakland; Omaha; Orlando; Pasadena; Philadelphia; Phoenix; Pittsburgh; Portland; Providence; Richmond; Sacramento; Salt Lake City; San Antonio; San Francisco; San Jose; Santa Ana; Santa Fe; Seattle; St. Louis; Tacoma; Tallahassee; Tampa; Topeka; Tulsa; Virginia Beach; Washington, D.C.; West Palm Beach; Wilmington; Wilmington.
- There is a full list of cities and mayors.

== Non-Annex I ==
UNFCCC (2005) compiled and synthesized information reported to it by non-Annex I Parties. Most reporting non-Annex I Parties belonged in the low-income group, with very few classified as middle-income (p. 4). Most Parties included information on policies relating to sustainable development. Sustainable development priorities mentioned by non-Annex I Parties included poverty alleviation and access to basic education and health care (p. 6). Multiple non-Annex I Parties are making efforts to amend and update their environmental legislation to include global concerns such as climate change (p. 7).

A few Parties, e.g., South Africa and Iran, stated their concern over how efforts to reduce emissions could affect their economies. The economies of these countries are highly dependent on income generated from the production, processing, and export of fossil fuels.

Emissions

GHG emissions, excluding land use change and forestry (LUCF), reported by 122 non-Annex I Parties for the year 1994 or the closest year reported, totalled 11.7 billion tonnes (billion = 1,000,000,000) of CO_{2}-eq. CO_{2} was the largest proportion of emissions (63%), followed by methane (26%) and nitrous oxide (N_{2}O) (11%).

The energy sector was the largest source of emissions for 70 Parties, whereas for 45 Parties the agriculture sector was the largest. Per capita emissions (in tonnes of CO_{2}-eq, excluding LUCF) averaged 2.8 tonnes for the 122 non-Annex I Parties.

- The Africa region's aggregate emissions were 1.6 billion tonnes, with per capita emissions of 2.4 tonnes.
- The Asia and Pacific region's aggregate emissions were 7.9 billion tonnes, with per capita emissions of 2.6 tonnes.
- The Latin America and Caribbean region's aggregate emissions were 2 billion tonnes, with per capita emissions of 4.6 tonnes.
- The "other" region includes Albania, Armenia, Azerbaijan, Georgia, Malta, Moldova, and Macedonia. Their aggregate emissions were 0.1 billion tonnes, with per capita emissions of 5.1 tonnes.

Parties reported a high level of uncertainty in LUCF emissions, but in aggregate, there appeared to only be a small difference of 1.7% with and without LUCF. With LUCF, emissions were 11.9 billion tonnes, without LUCF, total aggregate emissions were 11.7 billion tonnes.

=== Brazil ===
Brazil has a national objective to increase the share of alternative renewable energy sources (biomass, wind and small hydropower) to 10% by 2030. It also has programmes to protect public forests from deforestation (Stern, 2007, p. 456).

=== People's Republic of China ===
China has a number of domestic policy measures that affect its GHG emissions (Jones et al., 2008, p. 26). These include a target to reduce the energy intensity of their GDP by 20% during the 2005–10 period. China plans to expand renewable energy generation to 15% of total capacity by 2020 (Wang et al., p. 86). Other policies include (Jones et al., 2008, p. 26):

- support for research and development;
- reduced indirect taxation on renewable electricity generation;
- investment subsidies, energy efficiency standards, and the closure of the most energy-inefficient state-owned enterprises.

From 1995–2004, China energy efficiency efforts reduced its energy intensity by 30% (Wang et al., 2010, p. 87). From 2006–09, China achieved a 14.4% reduction in energy intensity. Renewables account for 8% of China's energy and 17% of its electricity. In response to the financial crisis, China implemented one of the world's largest stimulus's in efficient and clean energy (p. 85).

Emissions

In 2005, China made up 17% of global GHG emissions, with per capita emissions of 5.8 tons of GHG per head (MNP, 2007). Another way of measuring GHG emissions is to measure the cumulative emissions that a country has emitted over time (IEA, 2007b, p. 199). Over a long time period, cumulative emissions provide an indication of a country's total contribution to GHG concentrations in the atmosphere. Measured over the time period 1900–2005, China's cumulative energy-related CO_{2} emissions made up 8% of the global total (IEA, 2007b, p. 201).

==== Clean Development Mechanism (CDM) ====
A report by the Carbon Trust (2009) assessed the use of CDM in China. The CDM has been used to finance projects in China for renewable energy and HFC-23 reductions (HFC's are powerful greenhouse gases). For renewables, the CDM was judged to have helped to stimulate wind and small hydro power projects. Critics have argued that these policies would generally have taken place without the CDM (Carbon Trust, 2009, p. 56).

=== India ===
India signed and ratified the Protocol in August 2002. Since India is exempted from the framework of the treaty, it is expected to gain from the protocol in terms of transfer of technology and related foreign investments. At the G8 meeting in June 2005, Indian Prime Minister Manmohan Singh pointed out that the per-capita emission rates of the developing countries are a tiny fraction of those in the developed world. Following the principle of common but differentiated responsibility, India maintains that the major responsibility of curbing emission rests with the developed countries, which have accumulated emissions over a long period of time. However, the U.S. and other Western nations assert that India, along with China, will account for most of the emissions in the coming decades, owing to their rapid industrialization and economic growth.

Policies in India related to greenhouse gas emissions have included (Stern, 2007, p. 456; Jones et al., 2008, p. 26):

- the 11th Five Year Plan, which contains mandatory and voluntary measures to increase efficiency in power generation and distribution
- increased use of nuclear power and renewable energy
- a target to increase energy efficiency by 20% by 2016–17
- expanded electricity supply to villages
- policies designed to increase tree and forest cover
- building codes designed to reduce energy consumption

Emissions

In 2005, India accounted for 5% of global GHG emissions, with per capita emissions of 2.1 tons of GHG per head of population (MNP, 2007). Over the time period 1900–2005, India's contribution to the global total of cumulative energy-related CO_{2} emissions was 2% (IEA, 2007b, p. 201).

=== Pakistan ===
Although the Minister of State for environment Malik Min Aslam was at first not receptive, he subsequently convinced the Shoukat Aziz cabinet to ratify the Protocol. The decision was taken in 2001 but due to international circumstances, it was announced in Argentina in 2004 and accepted in 2005, opening the way for the creation of a policy framework. On 11 January 2005, Pakistan submitted its instruments of accession to the Kyoto Protocol. The Ministry of Environment assigned the task to work as designated national authority (DNA). According to a news story by Khan (2009), it was expected that the Protocol would help Pakistan lower dependence on fossil fuels through renewable energy projects.

Pakistan had a per capita income of US$492 in 2002–2003, and is a low-income country (Pakistan government, 2003, p. 15). The Pakistan government is concentrating on reducing the vulnerability of the country to current climatic events (p. 17). Though Pakistan is a developing country, the government is taking different steps to lower the pollution.

CDM

In February 2006, the national CDM operational strategy was approved, and on 27 April 2006, the first CDM project was approved by DNA. It was reduction of large N_{2}O from nitric acid production (investor: Mitsubishi, Japan), with an estimated annual production of 1 million CERs. Finally, in November 2006, the first CDM project was registered with the United Nations Framework Convention on Climate Change (UNFCCC).

Pakistan has specified preferences for the CDM projects, including (Pakistan government, 2006, pp. 3–4):

- alternative and renewable energy
- energy efficiency
- fossil fuel co-generation (co-generation is the use of waste heat from thermal electricity-generation plants (Verbruggen, 2007))
- Land use, land use change, and forestry, e.g., biodiversity protection
- waste management, e.g., reducing GHG emissions from latrines and animal waste (EcoSecurities, 2007, p. 72)

So far, 23 CDM so far have been approved by the Pakistan government (n.d.).

Emissions

Over the period from July 1993 to June 1994, Pakistan's energy sector was by far the highest contributor to CO_{2} emissions, with a share of 81% of total CO_{2} emissions (Pakistan government, 2003, pp. 16). Pakistan's energy-related CO_{2} emissions rose by 94.1% between 1990 and 2005 (World Bank, 2010, p. 362).

Pakistan's per capita emissions in 2005 were 0.8 tCO_{2} per head (p. 362). In 2005, Pakistan contributed 0.45% of the global total in energy-related CO_{2} emissions. Pakistan's cumulative emissions over the period 1850–2005 was 2.4 billion metric tons. Cumulative emissions before 1971 are based on data for East and West Pakistan.

== Asia Pacific Partnership on Clean Development and Climate ==
The Asia-Pacific Partnership for Clean Development and Climate (APP) is a US-led effort to accelerate the voluntary development and deployment of clean energy technologies (UNEP, 2007, p. 257). The purpose of the Partnership is to address the issues of energy security, air pollution, and climate change (IEA, 2007, p. 51). The partner countries are Australia, Canada, China, India, Japan, Korea, and the United States (APP, n.d., p. 1). According to the APP (n.d.), the APP contributes to Partners' efforts under the UNFCCC, while "complementing" the Kyoto Protocol.
