= Sam Bawlf =

Canadian politician and author

Member of the British Columbia Legislative Assembly for Victoria
- In office December 11, 1975 – May 10, 1979 Serving with Charles Frederick Barber
- Preceded by: David Anderson; Newell Morrison
- Succeeded by: Gordon William Hanson

Personal details
- Born: Robert Samuel Bawlf; June 7, 1944 Winnipeg, Manitoba
- Died: August 20, 2016 (aged 72) Saltspring Island, British Columbia
- Party: Social Credit
- Spouse: Marnie Bawlf
- Children: Chauney; Natasha

Robert Samuel Bawlf (June 7, 1944 – August 20, 2016) was a Canadian politician and author.

== Biography ==
In 1972, Bawlf was elected to Victoria City Council, the youngest person ever to have been so. In 1975, he was elected to the Legislative Assembly of British Columbia for the riding of Victoria as a member of the Social Credit Party. He was soon appointed Minister of Recreation and Conservation by Premier Bill Bennett. As minister, he oversaw the enactment of B.C.’s first Heritage Conservation Act. He subsequently served as Minister of Deregulation. He was defeated in the 1979 general election.

Bawlf's book, The Secret Journey of Sir Francis Drake, was published in 2003 and had sold more than 20,000 copies by the time of his death. Bawlf challenged the commonly held belief that fellow British explorer James Cook was the first European to ever visit the B.C. coast when he sailed into Nootka Sound in 1778. Bawlf died of cancer in 2016.

Bawlf had boldly proposed that the Drake expedition sailing from southern Mexico first sighted the northern continental coastline near the northern tip of Vancouver Island (as opposed to South of the island as commonly believed) and continued on exploring extensively the B.C. outer and inner passages coastlines. Drake would have sailed in a record time record distances within B.C. in spite of harsh conditions and huge risks while carrying a precious cargo. Under the cover of a "pirate" raiding Spanish galleons during the course of an already ambitious worldwide circumnavigation project (the second ever after Magellan), Drake would have managed to accomplish the B.C. coastal reconnaissance exploit under an elizabethan investors mandate to check the access to the western side of the Northwest Passage. Bawlf's book claim was nearly as bold as his hero Drake, with unfortunately limited evidence to back up Drake's expedition whereabouts whether in B.C., Washington, Oregon or California. Unsurprisingly, “The academic reception was mixed" according to his own publisher.
