= Robin Blencoe =

Canadian politician (born 1947)

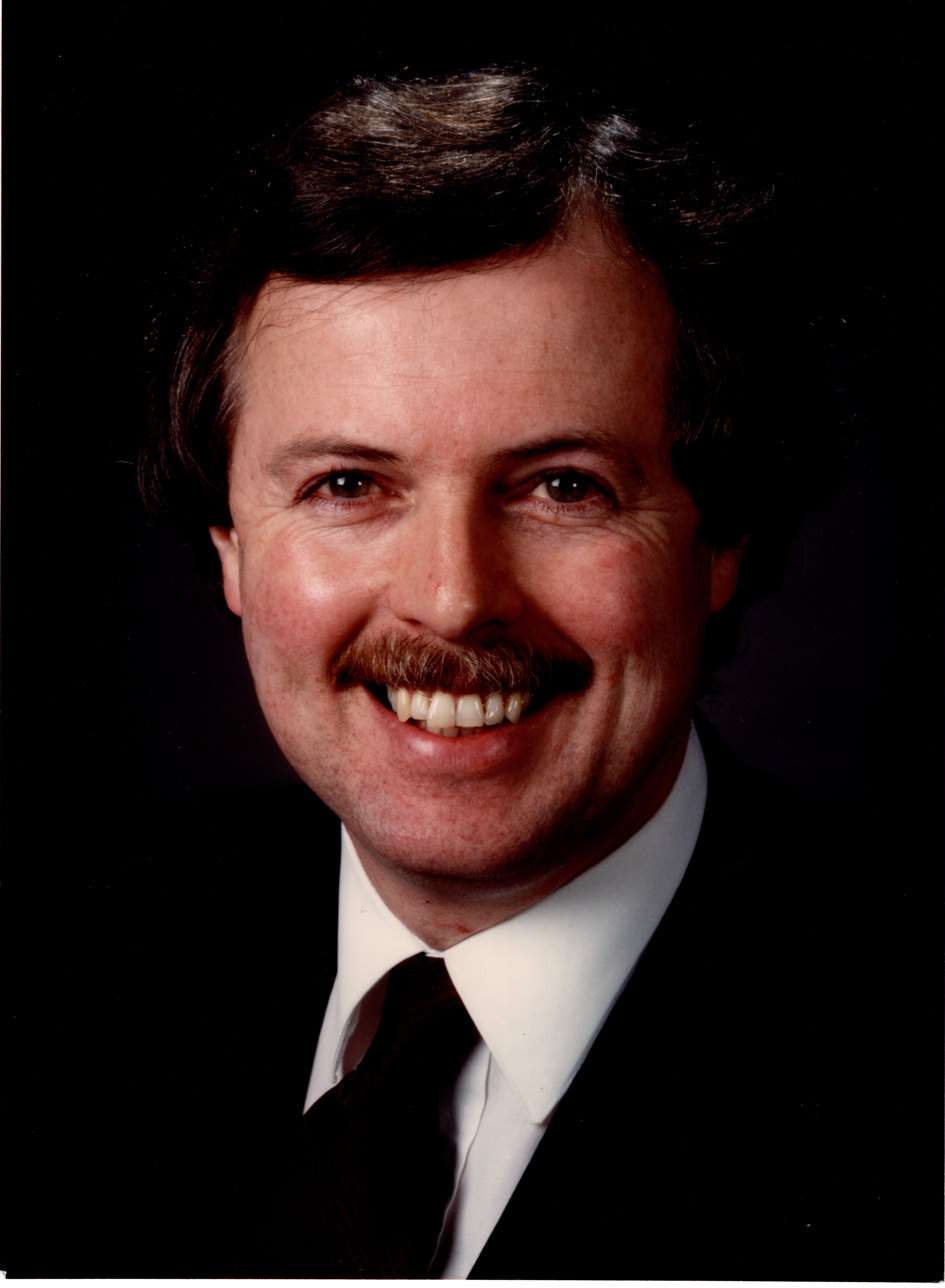

Member of the British Columbia Legislative Assembly for Victoria-Hillside Victoria (1983-1991)
- In office May 5, 1983 – May 28, 1996 Serving with Gordon Hanson (1983-1991)
- Preceded by: Charles Frederick Barber
- Succeeded by: Steve Orcherton

Minister of Municipal Affairs, Recreation and Housing of British Columbia
- In office November 5, 1991 – September 15, 1993
- Premier: Michael Harcourt
- Preceded by: Graham Bruce
- Succeeded by: Darlene Marzari (Municipal Affairs); Joan Smallwood (Housing, Recreation)

Minister of Government Services of British Columbia
- In office September 15, 1993 – March 9, 1995
- Premier: Michael Harcourt
- Preceded by: Lois Boone
- Succeeded by: Art Charbonneau

Minister Responsible for Sports and Commonwealth Games of British Columbia
- In office September 15, 1993 – March 9, 1995
- Premier: Michael Harcourt
- Succeeded by: Ujjal Dosanjh

Personal details
- Born: November 12, 1947 (age 79)
- Party: NDP

Robin Kyle Blencoe (born November 12, 1947) is a former politician in British Columbia, Canada. He was elected to represent the riding of Victoria in the Legislative Assembly of British Columbia in 1983 and 1986, and Victoria-Hillside in 1991. He served in the Cabinet of Mike Harcourt as Minister of Municipal Affairs, Minister of Government Services and the Minister Responsible for Sport and the Commonwealth Games. He was forced out of office due to a number of sexual harassment complaints, which resulted in Blencoe v. British Columbia (Human Rights Commission), a leading Supreme Court of Canada decision on the scope of section 7 of the Canadian Charter of Rights and Freedoms, and on the administrative law principle of natural justice.

Due to delays to the tribunal hearings the claims were not resolved for 30 months after the first filing in 1995. During this time Blencoe was subjected to vast media coverage that led to the end of his political career, and contributed to his and his family's social and psychological hardship. The Supreme Court of Canada rejected Blencoe's argument that the delay warranted a stay of the human rights complaint. Following this decision, the British Columbia Human Rights Tribunal issued its decision on the original sexual harassment complaint. The Tribunal found that Mr. Blencoe had engaged in conduct towards an employee which was sexual in nature and unwelcome, and that this conduct had a negative work-related impact on the employee. The Tribunal issued a declaration that Mr. Blencoe not engage in similar activity in the future and ordered that he pay $5000 to the former employee.
