= Victoria-Hillside =

Defunct provincial electoral district in British Columbia, Canada

Coordinates: 48.443°N 123.3609°W

British Columbia electoral district

Defunct provincial electoral district
- Legislature: Legislative Assembly of British Columbia
- First contested: 1991
- Last contested: 2005

Demographics
- Population (2001): 49,093
- Area (km²): 16.49

Victoria-Hillside was a provincial electoral district for the Legislative Assembly of British Columbia, Canada from 1991 to 2009.

== Demographics ==
| Population, 2001 | 49,093 |
| Population Change, 1996–2001 | 2.3% |
| Area (km^{2}) | 16.49 |
| Pop. Density (people per km^{2}) | 2,977 |

== Member of the Legislative Assembly ==
Victoria-Hillside
| Assembly | Years | Member | Party |
|---|---|---|---|
Riding created from Victoria
| 35th | 1991–1996 | Robin Blencoe | New Democratic |
| 36th | 1996–2001 | Steve Orcherton | New Democratic |
| 37th | 2001–2005 | Sheila Orr | Liberal |
| 38th | 2005–2009 | Rob Fleming | New Democratic |
Riding dissolved into Saanich South and Victoria-Swan Lake

Its final MLA was Rob Fleming, a former Victoria City Councillor and former University of Victoria Students' Society chairperson. He was first elected as a city councillor in 1999. He represents the British Columbia New Democratic Party.

== Election results ==
2005 British Columbia general election
| Party | Candidate | Votes | % | Expenditures |
|---|---|---|---|---|
| New Democratic | Rob Fleming | 13,926 | 57 | $72,755 |
| Liberal | Sheila Orr | 7,042 | 29 | $117,576 |
| Green | Steve Filipovic | 2,934 | 12 | $4,899 |
| Democratic Reform | Jim McDermott | 363 | 1.5 | $5,652 |
| Work Less | Katrina Jean Herriot | 167 | 0.7 | $100 |
| Total valid votes | | 24,432 | 100 | |
| Total rejected ballots | | 216 | 0.9 | |
| Turnout | | 24,648 | 63 | |

2001 British Columbia general election
| Party | Candidate | Votes | % | Expenditures |
|---|---|---|---|---|
| Liberal | Sheila Orr | 7,878 | 37.71 | $46,661 |
| New Democratic | Steve Orcherton | 7,796 | 37.31 | $49,950 |
| Green | Stuart Hertzog | 4,142 | 19.82 | $3,285 |
| Marijuana | Chuck Beyer | 663 | 3.17 | $762 |
| Unity | Allan Whittal | 293 | 1.40 | $870 |
| Communist | George Gidora | 72 | 0.35 | $749 |
| Citizens Commonwealth | Laery Braaten | 49 | 0.24 | $100 |
| Total valid votes | | 20,893 | | |
| Total rejected ballots | | 140 | 0.67 | |
| Turnout | | 21,033 | 68.73 | |

1996 British Columbia general election
| Party | Candidate | Votes | % | Expenditures |
|---|---|---|---|---|
| New Democratic | Steve Orcherton | 11,585 | 53.32 | $37,372 |
| Liberal | Sheila Orr | 6,862 | 31.58 | $40,983 |
| Progressive Democrat | Gary Beyer | 1,227 | 5.65 | $100 |
| Reform | Dan Willson | 979 | 4.51 | $5,595 |
| Green | David Scott White | 790 | 3.64 | $4,715 |
| Western Canada Concept | Erich Peter | 102 | 0.47 | $2,304 |
| Natural Law | Andy Guest | 97 | 0.45 | $211 |
| Libertarian | C. David Randall | 86 | 0.40 | |
| Total valid votes | | 21,728 | | |
| Total rejected ballots | | 139 | 0.64 | |
| Turnout | | 21,867 | 67.53 | |

1991 British Columbia general election
| Party | Candidate | Votes | % | Expenditures |
|---|---|---|---|---|
| New Democratic | Robin Blencoe | 11,117 | 51.39 | $29,374 |
| Liberal | Elmer Wiens | 7,233 | 33.43 | $4,018 |
| Social Credit | Patrick Skillings | 2,714 | 12.55 | $20,169 |
| Green | Jay Van Oostdam | 569 | 2.63 | $1,286 |
| Total valid votes | | 21,633 | 100 | |
| Total rejected ballots | | 584 | 2.63 | |
| Turnout | | 22,217 | 73.37 | |
