= Rob Fleming =

Canadian politician (born 1971)

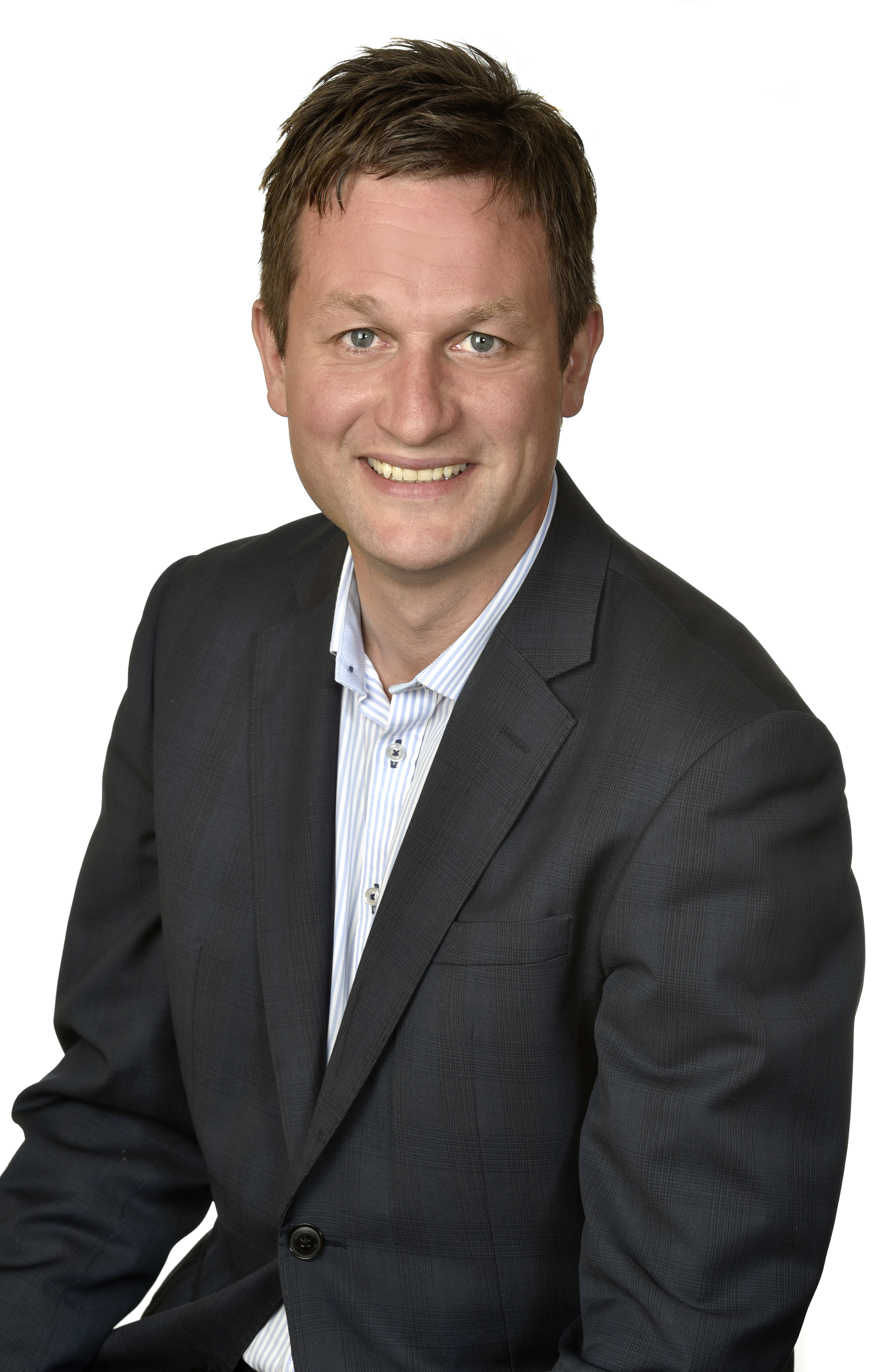

Minister of Transportation and Infrastructure of British Columbia
- In office November 26, 2020 – November 18, 2024
- Premier: John Horgan; David Eby
- Preceded by: Claire Trevena
- Succeeded by: Mike Farnworth (Transportation and Transit); Bowinn Ma (Infrastructure)

Minister of Education of British Columbia
- In office July 18, 2017 – November 26, 2020
- Premier: John Horgan
- Preceded by: Mike Bernier
- Succeeded by: Jennifer Whiteside

Member of the British Columbia Legislative Assembly for Victoria-Swan Lake Victoria-Hillside (2005–2009)
- In office May 17, 2005 – September 21, 2024
- Preceded by: Sheila Orr
- Succeeded by: Nina Krieger

Victoria City Councillor
- In office 1999–2005

Personal details
- Born: November 11, 1971 (age 54) Windsor, Ontario
- Party: New Democrat
- Spouse: Maura Parte
- Children: 2
- Education: University of Victoria
- Profession: Communications consulting

Rob Fleming (born November 11, 1971) is a Canadian politician who sat in the Legislative Assembly of British Columbia from 2005 provincial election, when he defeated one-term Liberal Party incumbent, Sheila Orr, until 2024. Initially representing Victoria-Hillside, he was re-elected in subsequent elections in the renamed constituency of Victoria-Swan Lake. A member of the British Columbia New Democratic Party (BC NDP), he was named to the cabinet of British Columbia in July 2017 as Minister of Education, before assuming the post as Minister of Transportation and Infrastructure in November 2020, serving in that position until 2024. Prior to entering provincial politics, he was a city councillor in Victoria, British Columbia from 1999 to 2005.

In the 38th Parliament Fleming was the New Democrat critic for Advanced Education, sat on the Select Standing Committee on Education, and introduced two education-related private member bills: the Private Post-Secondary Accountability and Student Protection Act, 2007 and the Restoring Credibility to Universities Act, 2008. He was also assigned to the Select Standing Committee on Public Accounts and introduced the Payday Lending Act, 2006 which sought to regulate the conditions of payday loans and led to the government adopting the Business Practices and Consumer Protection (Payday Loans) Amendment Act a year later.

In the 39th Parliament Fleming became the NDP's environment critic. He introduced the Cosmetic Pesticide and Carcinogen Control Act and sat on the subsequent Special Committee on Cosmetic Pesticides which investigated potential bans or regulations on pesticides used for cosmetic purposes. Fleming also introduced the Species at Risk Protection Act, after the government delayed a promise to review its species-at-risk legislation, and the Sustainable Development Indicators and Reporting Act, 2011 which sought to create a Sustainable Development Board to report on provincial sustainability-related indicators. Fleming sat on the Select Standing Committee on Legislative Initiatives which considered the petition seeking the repeal of the Harmonized Sales Tax.

In the 40th Parliament Fleming was appointed to be the NDP's education critic. He introduced the private member bill Youth Voter Registration Act that would have allowed provisional voter registration of people between the ages of 16 and 18, a measure that was later adopted in 2019.

== Background ==
Born in Windsor, Ontario, Fleming and his family moved to BC when he was three years old, settling on Greater Vancouver's North Shore. In the 1988 federal election, he assisted in the New Democratic Party's campaign in the riding of Capilano—Howe Sound. From 1993 to 1995 he attended the university transfer program at Camosun College in Saanich, which later awarded him the 2008 Distinguished Alumni Award. While at Camosun, Fleming served as communications coordinator for the student society.

He then enrolled in the University of Victoria (UVic), where he majored in history. As president of the UVic Students' Society, he was active in acquiring universal access to BC Transit for students through a U-Pass system. After graduating with a bachelor of arts degree in 2002, he started work with a communication consulting business.

He met his wife Maura Parte while attending UVic; together, they have one daughter, Rory, and one son.

== Municipal politics ==
While still at university, he stood as a candidate for Victoria City Council in the 1999 municipal elections as a member of the Victoria Civic Electors, which ran a joint slate of seven candidates with the Green Party. Fleming finished third in voting, securing him a seat on the eight-member council. He was re-elected councillor in 2002, this time receiving the second highest vote count. He traveled to El Salvador in 2004, as part of a 13-member delegation of election observers to monitor the presidential election.

While on Victoria City Council, Fleming gained a reputation for being a "fiscally prudent democratic socialist". He supported the legalization of secondary suites, the construction of the Save-On-Foods Memorial Centre (but voted against the option to have it privately operated), and amendments to bylaws to target aggressive panhandling. As a director on the board of the Capital Regional District (CRD), Fleming was vice-chair of the CRD Housing Corporation where he advocated for an Affordable Housing Trust Fund. He sat on the Victoria Regional Transit Commission and has advocated for transit service expansion and light rail in Greater Victoria. He was a member of the Provincial Capital Commission and was the only member to vote against, due to concerns with the long-term lease agreement and risks involved, replacing the plant and animal conservatory Crystal Gardens with the multi-media tourist attraction, The B.C. Experience, which filed for bankruptcy protection three months after opening.

== Provincial politics ==
With the 2005 BC general election still a year away, Fleming declared his interest in seeking the NDP nomination in the Victoria-Hillside riding. Within a few months, former Member of the Legislative Assembly (MLA) Steve Orcherton, who had won the riding in 1996 but lost in 2001, declared his candidacy for the NDP nomination. The primary was billed as a contest between the hard line "old-school union man" Orcherton versus the "new wave" moderate Fleming which was seen as the symbolic struggle that was occurring throughout the party. Fleming won the NDP nomination in January and began campaigning in April for the general election. Fleming was one of five candidates across the province who were endorsed by the Conservation Voters of British Columbia. In the May general election Fleming defeated the incumbent BC Liberal Sheila Orr and Green Party candidate and small business owner Steve Filipovic. Fleming resigned from his position as Victoria city councillor to become a New Democratic MLA, as part of the Official Opposition.

=== 38th Parliament ===
In the 38th Parliament, Fleming and chaired the Select Standing Committee on Public Accounts and part way through the 2nd session he was assigned to the Select Standing Committee on Education which focused on adult literacy. He introduced several pieces of legislation, including the Payday Lending Act, 2006, which sought to license payday lenders and regulate the conditions of payday loans, including plain language rules, rights to cancellation, signage requirements. While Solicitor General John Les stated he was in favour of many of the regulations, he felt the bill was premature and that changes to the federal Criminal Code were required before proceeding with such regulations, despite other provinces already having passed similar legislation. The bill was granted first reading on May 8, 2006, but without the government support the bill was not adopted. However, a year later, a similar bill, introduced by Les, the Business Practices and Consumer Protection (Payday Loans) Amendment Act, 2007 was introduced and adopted concurrent with federal amendments to the Criminal Code.

Fleming was assigned the role of critic for advanced education. He introduced the Private Post-Secondary Accountability and Student Protection Act, 2007 which was intended to increase the accountability of private career training institutions and increasing the enforcement abilities of the Degree Quality Assessment Board. He spoke out against deregulation that allowed diploma mills like Rutherford University and Kingston College which advertised to foreign students. He introduced the Restoring Credibility to Universities Act, 2008 which sought to repeal the World Trade University Canada Establishment Act and portions of the 2007 Education Statutes Amendment Act concerning private post-secondary institutions. Fleming also took on the role as the NDP tourism critic and objected to Tourism Minister Bill Bennett's decision not to participate in the National Vigil Project (a light display honouring Canadians killed World War One) due to costs and, in response to funding cuts to Tourism BC, he criticized government self-promotional advertising.

=== 39th Parliament ===
While his riding was re-aligned to create Victoria-Swan Lake, Fleming easily won re-election facing no opposition for the NDP nomination and receiving 61% of the votes in the May 2009 general election. In the 39th Parliament, his party once again formed the Official Opposition to a BC Liberal majority government. Party leader Carole James assigned him the role of environment critic with the intent of re-casting the party's image on environmental issues following the party's negatively received campaign plank of repealing the carbon tax. Fleming, and the party, stopped calling for a repeal of the carbon tax and instead emphasized a more nuanced position in providing alternatives which would improve the tax. He linked planned increases in transit fares to global warming and spoke out against fee increases at provincial park campsites.

In November 2009, and again in April 2010, he introduced the Cosmetic Pesticide and Carcinogen Control Act which would have prohibited the sale or use of cosmetic pesticides, other than those deemed low-risk. The Special Committee on Cosmetic Pesticides was struck, with Fleming as deputy chair, to investigate the potential for regulating or banning the use or sale of pesticides used for cosmetic purposes. They first convened in July 2011 and reported in 2012.

In the August 2009 Throne Speech the BC government committed to striking a task force on the topic of species-at-risk, but with no action since then, Fleming introduced his own Species at Risk Protection Act in May 2010, based on similar legislation in Ontario. The Minister of Environment Barry Penner responded in June by striking a ten member species-at-risk task force consisting of academics and representatives of industry and non-profit organizations, who were told to make recommendations to directly cabinet. The task force report was submitted in January 2011 but, with the government not making the report public, Fleming re-introduced his legislation in June 2011 the report was made public less than a month later).

In addition, Fleming participated in two committees. In the first two sessions he was deputy chair of the Select Standing Committee on Parliamentary Reform, Ethical Conduct, Standing Orders and Private Bills, which met once in each session to review private bills. He was member of the Select Standing Committee on Legislative Initiatives, the committee that only met twice, both times in September 2010, to deal with a petition seeking the repeal of the Harmonized Sales Tax; Fleming and the three other New Democratic Party members voted to recommend introducing the draft HST Extinguishment Act into the Legislative Assembly, while the five BC Liberal members voted to initiate the 2011 British Columbia sales tax referendum.

During the BC NDP leadership election to replace Carole James, Fleming supported Mike Farnworth, though Adrian Dix eventually won. Dix kept Fleming as the critic for Environment. When Parliament re-convened for a fourth session Fleming introduced another private member bill, the Sustainable Development Indicators and Reporting Act, 2011 which sought to create a Sustainable Development Board to measure and report on indicators of BC's economic, environmental and social sustainability.

=== 40th Parliament ===
With the May 2013 election approaching, the 41-year-old Fleming sought re-election in the Victoria-Swan Lake riding. He defeated the BC Liberal candidate, small-business owner Christina Bates, and the BC Green candidate Spencer Malthouse. Despite his win and favourable polling, Fleming's party lost the general election and again formed the official opposition. Fleming was critical of party leader Adrian Dix's positive-only campaigning during the election, partly blamed for the upset loss, saying that it allowed their opponents to define who they were and then attack that without response. Dix appointed Fleming to the role of education critic, moving his previous role of environment critic to Spencer Chandra Herbert.

Upon Dix's resignation as leader of the BC NDP, Fleming was considered as a potential candidate and actively considered seeking the role. However, after both John Horgan and Mike Farnworth announced their intention to run, Fleming decided he would not; he later endorsed Horgan's candidacy. Horgan went on to become the leader and kept Fleming in his education critic role.

In December 2015, Fleming fired his constituency assistant who was subsequently arrested, in July 2016, for defrauding the Victoria-Swan Lake constituency office of $120,420 since March 2009. Fleming sponsored the private member bill Youth Voter Registration Act, 2015 which sought allow provisional voter registration of people between the ages or 16 and 18, one of the recommendations of a 2011 report by the Chief Electoral Officer. The bill was not advanced and he re-introduced it in February 2017 as the Election (Increasing Youth Participation) Amendment Act, 2017. The measure was eventually adopted during the 41st Parliament as part of the Election Amendment Act, 2019.

=== 41st Parliament ===
For the 2017 general election Fleming was challenged by digital media management consultant Stacey Piercey for the BC Liberal Party, Vancouver medical researcher Chris Maxwell for the Green Party, and David Costigane for the Vancouver Island Party. Fleming was again re-elected with his party forming the Official Opposition, but this time in a BC Liberal minority government. However, in the first session of the 41st Parliament the BC Liberal government lost a confidence vote and the second session began with the BC NDP forming a minority government. In July 2017, Premier John Horgan appointed Fleming Minister of Education in the Executive Council of British Columbia. In that role he oversaw the suspension of in-class learning in the province's schools during the initial months of the COVID-19 pandemic in 2020; that August he announced the re-opening of schools on September 10, 2020 for the new school year.

=== 42nd Parliament ===
In the October 2020 snap election called by Premier John Horgan, Fleming handily won re-election with more than 59% of the vote. Following a cabinet shuffle on November 26, 2020, he was reassigned to the position of the Minister of Transportation and Infrastructure, replacing Claire Trevena, the incumbent minister who declined to seek re-election. He was in turn replaced by Jennifer Whiteside as Minister of Education.

In the new cabinet announced by Premier David Eby on December 7, 2022, Fleming retained the post of Minister of Transportation and Infrastructure.

On July 5, 2024, Fleming announced that he would not run in the 2024 election.

== Electoral history ==
2020 British Columbia general election: Victoria-Swan Lake
Party	Candidate	Votes	%	±%	Expenditures
New Democratic	Rob Fleming	14,186	59.35	+5.75	$29,468.05
Green	Annemieke Holthuis	6,638	27.77	−1.94	$11,832.34
Liberal	David Somerville	2,729	11.42	−4.45	$2,429.03
Independent	Jenn Smith	241	1.01	–	$8,085.95
Communist	Walt Parsons	107	0.45	–	$123.40
Total valid votes		23,901	99.27	–	
Total rejected ballots		175	0.73	+0.05	
Turnout		24,076	59.02	–5.31	
Registered voters		40,790			
New Democratic hold		Swing		+3.84	
Source: Elections BC

2017 British Columbia general election: Victoria-Swan Lake
Party	Candidate	Votes	%	±%	Expenditures
New Democratic	Rob Fleming	13,374	53.61	−0.88	$46,600
Green	Christopher Alan Maxwell	7,413	29.71	+6.50	$6,955
Liberal	Stacey Piercey	3,960	15.87	−6.43	$27,194
Vancouver Island Party	David Costigane	203	0.81	–	$0
Total valid votes		24,950	100.00	–	
Total rejected ballots		169	0.67	+0.04	
Turnout		25,119	64.33	+6.26	
Registered voters		39,046			
New Democratic hold		Swing		−2.81	
Source: Elections BC

2013 British Columbia general election: Victoria-Swan Lake
Party	Candidate	Votes	%	±%	Expenditures
New Democratic	Rob Fleming	12,350	54.49	−6.04	$82,519
Green	Spencer Alexander Malthouse	5,260	23.21	+11.09	$5,028
Liberal	Christina Bates	5,055	22.30	−4.24	$36,719
Total valid votes		22,665	100.00	–	
Total rejected ballots		143	0.63	−0.07	
Turnout		22,808	58.07	+1.17	
Registered voters		39,275			
Source: Elections BC

2009 British Columbia general election: Victoria-Swan Lake
Party	Candidate	Votes	%	±%	Expenditures
New Democratic	Rob Fleming	13,119	60.53	+4.53	$75,655
Liberal	Jesse McClinton	5,754	26.54	−2.54	$36,875
Green	David Wright	2,628	12.12	+0.12	$760
Refederation	Bob Savage	174	0.81	–	$750
Total valid votes		21,675	100.00	–	
Total rejected ballots		153	0.70	−0.20	
Turnout		21,828	56.90	−6.10	
Registered voters		38,359			
Net change is calculated based on the 2005 results from Victoria-Hillside.
Source: Elections BC

2005 British Columbia general election: Victoria-Hillside
Party	Candidate	Votes	%	Expenditures
New Democratic	Rob Fleming	13,926	57	$72,755
Liberal	Sheila Orr	7,042	29	$117,576
Green	Steve Filipovic	2,934	12	$4,899
Democratic Reform	Jim McDermott	363	1.5	$5,652
Work Less	Katrina Jean Herriot	167	0.7	$100
Total valid votes		24,432	100	
Total rejected ballots		216	0.9	
Turnout		24,648	63	

British Columbia provincial government of David Eby
Cabinet post (1)
Predecessor	Office	Successor
cont'd from Horgan Ministry	Minister of Transportation and Infrastructure; December 7, 2022 –	Incumbent
British Columbia provincial government of John Horgan
Cabinet posts (2)
Predecessor	Office	Successor
Claire Trevena	Minister of Transportation and Infrastructure; November 26, 2020 − December 7, 2022	cont'd into Eby Ministry
Mike Bernier	Minister of Education; July 18, 2017 – November 26, 2020	Jennifer Whiteside
