= WTU =

WTU may refer to

- Warrior Transition Unit, part of the U.S. Army Wounded Warrior Program
- Washington Theological Union, a former graduate school in the United States
- West Texas Utilities, an American energy retailer
- Women's Typographical Union, a former American trade union
- World Technological University, an old name for Moscow Technological Institute
- World Trade University, a former private university in Canada
