= Victoria-Swan Lake =

Provincial electoral district in British Columbia, Canada

British Columbia electoral district

Provincial electoral district
- Legislature: Legislative Assembly of British Columbia
MLA
Nina Krieger
New Democratic
- District created: 2008
- First contested: 2009
- Last contested: 2026

Demographics
- Population (2021): 54,780
- Area (km²): 18
- Pop. density (per km²): 3,043.3
- Census division: Capital Regional District
- Census subdivision(s): Victoria (part), Saanich (part)

Victoria-Swan Lake is a provincial electoral district for the Legislative Assembly of British Columbia.

== Demographics ==
Population, 2021	54,780
Area (km^{2})	18
Pop. density (people per km^{2})	3,043
Source: BC Electoral Boundaries Commission

== Geography ==
Victoria-Swan Lake makes up the northern portions of Victoria and the southern portions of Saanich. The Victoria section, north of Bay Street, consists of the neighbourhoods of Burnside-Gorge, Hillside-Quadra, and Oaklands. In Saanich, the electoral district covers Tillicum-Gorge, Uptown, and Quadra-Cedar Hill.

== Members of the Legislative Assembly ==
This riding has elected the following members of the Legislative Assembly:

Assembly	Years	Member	Party
Victoria-Swan Lake; Riding created from Victoria-Hillside
39th	2009–2013	Rob Fleming	New Democratic
40th	2013–2017	Rob Fleming	New Democratic
41st	2017–2020	Rob Fleming	New Democratic
42nd	2020–2024	Rob Fleming	New Democratic
43rd	2024–2026	Nina Krieger	New Democratic
44th	2026–present	Nina Krieger	New Democratic

== Electoral history ==
2026 British Columbia general election
** Preliminary results — Not yet official **
Party	Candidate	Votes	%	±%
New Democratic	Nina Krieger	9,250	43.64	-12.39
Green	Carolyn Howe	7,470	35.24	+12.09
Conservative	Tim Taylor	4,475	21.11	+0.91
Total valid votes		21,195	99.82	
Total rejected ballots		39	0.18	-0.02
Turnout		21,234		
Registered voters				
New Democratic hold		Swing		-12.24
Source: Elections BC

2024 British Columbia general election
Party	Candidate	Votes	%	±%	Expenditures
New Democratic	Nina Krieger	14,273	56.0%	-3.35	
Green	Christina Winter	5,900	23.2%	-4.57	
Conservative	Tim Taylor	5,146	20.2%		
Communist	Robert Crooks	156	0.6%	+0.15	
Total valid votes		25,475	–		
Total rejected ballots					
Turnout					
Registered voters					
New Democratic hold		Swing		-11.78	
Source: Elections BC

2020 British Columbia general election
Party	Candidate	Votes	%	±%	Expenditures
New Democratic	Rob Fleming	14,186	59.35	+5.75	$29,468.05
Green	Annemieke Holthuis	6,638	27.77	−1.94	$11,832.34
Liberal	David Somerville	2,729	11.42	−4.45	$2,429.03
Independent	Jenn Smith	241	1.01	–	$8,085.95
Communist	Walt Parsons	107	0.45	–	$123.40
Total valid votes		23,901	99.27	–	
Total rejected ballots		175	0.73	+0.05	
Turnout		24,076	59.02	–5.31	
Registered voters		40,790			
New Democratic hold		Swing		+3.84	
Source: Elections BC

2017 British Columbia general election
Party	Candidate	Votes	%	±%	Expenditures
New Democratic	Rob Fleming	13,374	53.61	−0.88	$46,600
Green	Christopher Alan Maxwell	7,413	29.71	+6.50	$6,955
Liberal	Stacey Piercey	3,960	15.87	−6.43	$27,194
Vancouver Island Party	David Costigane	203	0.81	–	$0
Total valid votes		24,950	100.00	–	
Total rejected ballots		169	0.67	+0.04	
Turnout		25,119	64.33	+6.26	
Registered voters		39,046			
New Democratic hold		Swing		−2.81	
Source: Elections BC

2013 British Columbia general election
Party	Candidate	Votes	%	±%	Expenditures
New Democratic	Rob Fleming	12,350	54.49	−6.04	$82,519
Green	Spencer Alexander Malthouse	5,260	23.21	+11.09	$5,028
Liberal	Christina Bates	5,055	22.30	−4.24	$36,719
Total valid votes		22,665	100.00	–	
Total rejected ballots		143	0.63	−0.07	
Turnout		22,808	58.07	+1.17	
Registered voters		39,275			
Source: Elections BC

2009 British Columbia general election
Party	Candidate	Votes	%	±%	Expenditures
New Democratic	Rob Fleming	13,119	60.53	+4.53	$75,655
Liberal	Jesse McClinton	5,754	26.54	−2.54	$36,875
Green	David Wright	2,628	12.12	+0.12	$760
Refederation	Bob Savage	174	0.81	–	$750
Total valid votes		21,675	100.00	–	
Total rejected ballots		153	0.70	−0.20	
Turnout		21,828	56.90	−6.10	
Registered voters		38,359			
Net change is calculated based on the 2005 results from Victoria-Hillside.
Source: Elections BC

== See also ==
- List of British Columbia provincial electoral districts
- Canadian provincial electoral districts
