= Sheila Orr =

Canadian politician

Member of the British Columbia Legislative Assembly for Victoria-Hillside
- In office May 16, 2001 – May 17, 2005
- Preceded by: Steve Orcherton
- Succeeded by: Rob Fleming

Personal details
- Born: 1949 or 1950 (age 76–77)
- Party: BC Liberal

Sheila Orr (born 1949 or 1950) is a Canadian politician, who represented the electoral district of Victoria-Hillside in the Legislative Assembly of British Columbia from 2001 until her defeat in the 2005 provincial election. She sat as a member of the BC Liberal Party.

Prior to her election, she served on Saanich District Council and as a director of the Capital Regional District.

== Electoral record ==
1996 British Columbia general election: Victoria-Hillside
Party	Candidate	Votes	%	Expenditures
New Democratic	Steve Orcherton	11,585	53.32	$37,372
Liberal	Sheila Orr	6,862	31.58	$40,983
Progressive Democrat	Gary Beyer	1,227	5.65	$100
Reform	Dan Willson	979	4.51	$5,595
Green	David Scott White	790	3.64	$4,715
Western Canada Concept	Erich Peter	102	0.47	$2,304
Natural Law	Andy Guest	97	0.45	$211
Libertarian	C. David Randall	86	0.40	
Total valid votes		21,728		
Total rejected ballots		139	0.64	
Turnout		21,867	67.53	

2001 British Columbia general election: Victoria-Hillside
Party	Candidate	Votes	%	Expenditures
Liberal	Sheila Orr	7,878	37.71	$46,661
New Democratic	Steve Orcherton	7,796	37.31	$49,950
Green	Stuart Hertzog	4,142	19.82	$3,285
Marijuana	Chuck Beyer	663	3.17	$762
Unity	Allan Whittal	293	1.40	$870
Communist	George Gidora	72	0.35	$749
Citizens Commonwealth	Laery Braaten	49	0.24	$100
Total valid votes		20,893		
Total rejected ballots		140	0.67	
Turnout		21,033	68.73	

2005 British Columbia general election: Victoria-Hillside
Party	Candidate	Votes	%	Expenditures
New Democratic	Rob Fleming	13,926	57	$72,755
Liberal	Sheila Orr	7,042	29	$117,576
Green	Steve Filipovic	2,934	12	$4,899
Democratic Reform	Jim McDermott	363	1.5	$5,652
Work Less	Katrina Jean Herriot	167	0.7	$100
Total valid votes		24,432	100	
Total rejected ballots		216	0.9	
Turnout		24,648	63	
