= Steve Orcherton =

Canadian politician

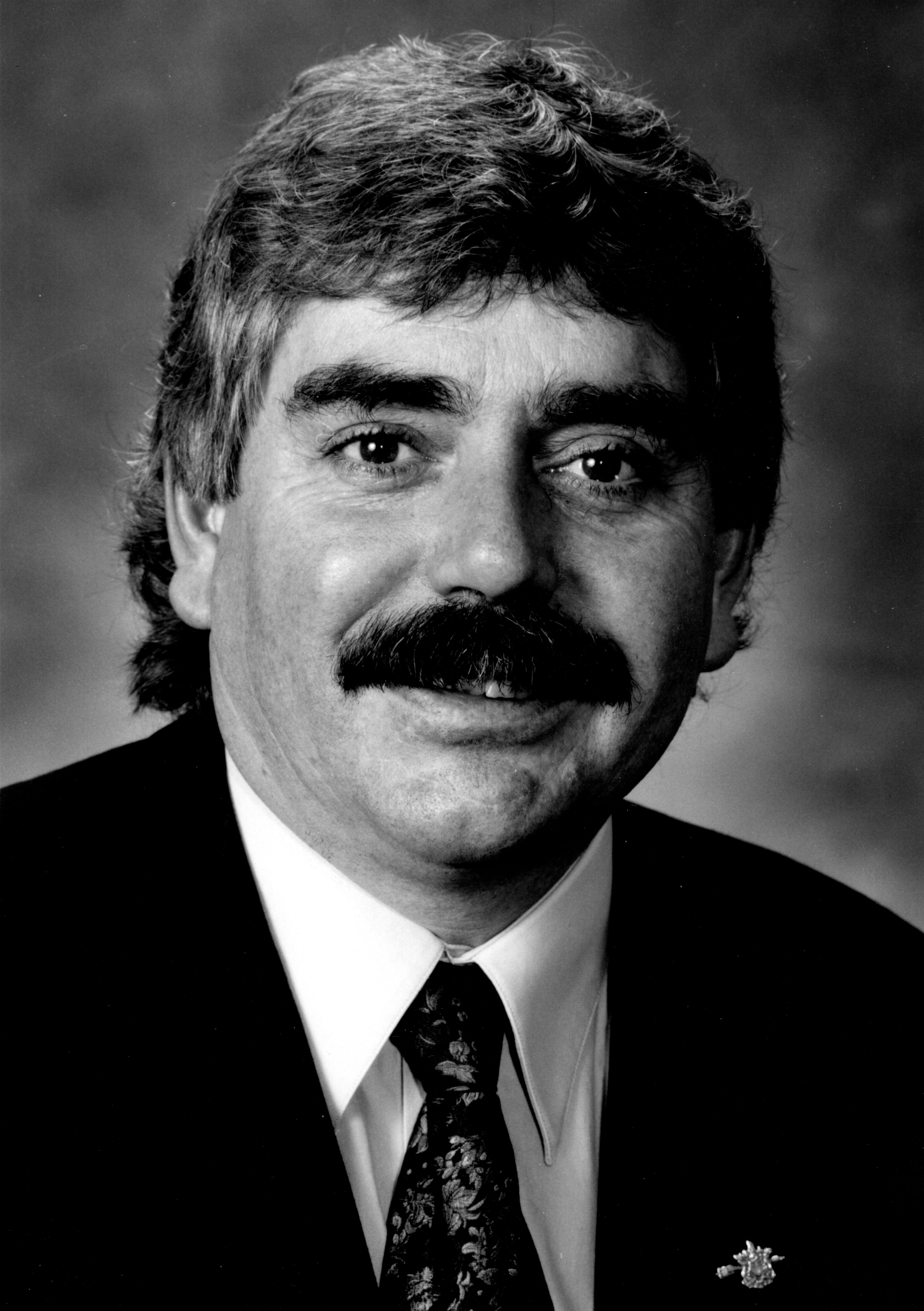

MLA for Victoria-Hillside
- In office 1996–2001
- Preceded by: Robin Blencoe
- Succeeded by: Sheila Orr

Personal details
- Born: 1952 or 1953 (age 73–74) Fort Churchill, Manitoba
- Party: New Democrat

Steve Orcherton (born 1952) is a Canadian politician, who represented the electoral district of Victoria-Hillside in the Legislative Assembly of British Columbia from 1996 to 2001. He sat as a member of the New Democratic Party.

He was defeated by only 82 votes in the 2001 provincial election by Sheila Orr, the same candidate he had faced in the 1996 provincial election. In the 2005 provincial election, Orcherton again sought the New Democratic Party nomination in Victoria-Hillside, but lost to Rob Fleming, who defeated Orr in the general election.

== Electoral record ==
1996 British Columbia general election: Victoria-Hillside
Party	Candidate	Votes	%	Expenditures
New Democratic	Steve Orcherton	11,585	53.32	$37,372
Liberal	Sheila Orr	6,862	31.58	$40,983
Progressive Democrat	Gary Beyer	1,227	5.65	$100
Reform	Dan Willson	979	4.51	$5,595
Green	David Scott White	790	3.64	$4,715
Western Canada Concept	Erich Peter	102	0.47	$2,304
Natural Law	Andy Guest	97	0.45	$211
Libertarian	C. David Randall	86	0.40	
Total valid votes		21,728		
Total rejected ballots		139	0.64	
Turnout		21,867	67.53	

2001 British Columbia general election: Victoria-Hillside
Party	Candidate	Votes	%	Expenditures
Liberal	Sheila Orr	7,878	37.71	$46,661
New Democratic	Steve Orcherton	7,796	37.31	$49,950
Green	Stuart Hertzog	4,142	19.82	$3,285
Marijuana	Chuck Beyer	663	3.17	$762
Unity	Allan Whittal	293	1.40	$870
Communist	George Gidora	72	0.35	$749
Citizens Commonwealth	Laery Braaten	49	0.24	$100
Total valid votes		20,893		
Total rejected ballots		140	0.67	
Turnout		21,033	68.73	
