= KYOTOplus =

Canadian climate change campaign

KYOTOplus is a joint campaign of a number of public interest groups in Canada to encourage and support Canadians in a call for stronger policy on Climate Change. The campaign was devised as a means to educate the Canadian public on issues related to climate change and global warming and to encourage Canadians to take a strong stance at the climate talks in Copenhagen in December 2009.

Canadian politicians are invited to indicate a strong stance against global warming by means of the KYOTOplus Pledge. The KYOTOplus Petition, which calls for a minimum 25% decrease in greenhouse gas emission in Canada by 2020 (in comparison to 1990), is available for signing by any Canadian.

== Sponsors ==
Public interest groups united in the KYOTOplus campaign include:

- l'Association québécoise de lutte contre la pollution atmosphérique (AQLPA)
- British Columbia Sustainable Energy Association
- Climate Action Network / Reseau action climat Canada
- Canadian Parks and Wilderness Society (CPAWS ) / la Société pour la nature et les parcs du Canada (SNAP)
- Canadian Youth Climate Coalition / La Coalition canadienne des jeunes pour le climat
- Citizens Environmental Alliance
- David Suzuki Foundation
- Edmonton Friends of the North Environmental Society
- Équiterre
- Greenpeace Canada
- Kairos
- Manitoba Wildlands
- 8Oxfam
- Projet St-Laurent/Jour de la Terre
- QuébecKyoto
- Science for Peace (Working Group on Climate)
- Sierra Club Canada
- TakingITglobal
- Vegetarians of Alberta
