= George William Anderson (Canadian politician) =

Canadian politician (1836–1909)

Member of the Legislative Assembly of British Columbia for Victoria
- In office 1886–1894

Personal details
- Born: May 20, 1836 Wotton, Surrey, England
- Died: April 21, 1909 (aged 72)
- Occupation: Farmer, baker, politician

George William Anderson (May 20, 1836 – April 21, 1909) was an English-born farmer, baker and political figure in British Columbia. He represented Victoria in the Legislative Assembly of British Columbia from 1886 to 1894. He retired and did not seek a third term in the Legislature in the 1894 provincial election.

He was born in Wotton, Surrey, the son of John Anderson, and was educated at Dorking. At the age of 14, he left school to work with his father on the family farm. The following year, he apprenticed as a baker, working for three years in England before travelling to New York City in 1854. Two years later, Anderson moved to Dubuque, Iowa, opening his own business there. He married Mary O'Connell there in 1859. In 1864, he sold his business, investing in horses, which he sold at a profit in California. Anderson then entered the bakery business again in Grass Valley. In 1869, he sold his business and moved to the Lakes District in British Columbia, where he purchased a farm. Anderson later opened a bakery business in Victoria, continuing to operate his farm. In 1882, he sold the business in Victoria. He died at Cedar Hill.
