= Robert John (disambiguation) =

Robert John (1946–2025) was an American singer-songwriter.

Robert John may also refer to:

- Robert John (photographer) (born 1961), American music photographer
- Robert Franklin John (1851–1905), farmer and politician in British Columbia, Canada

== See also ==
- Robert St. John (1902–2003), American author, broadcaster, and journalist
