= Nina Krieger =

Canadian politician

Nina Krieger MLA
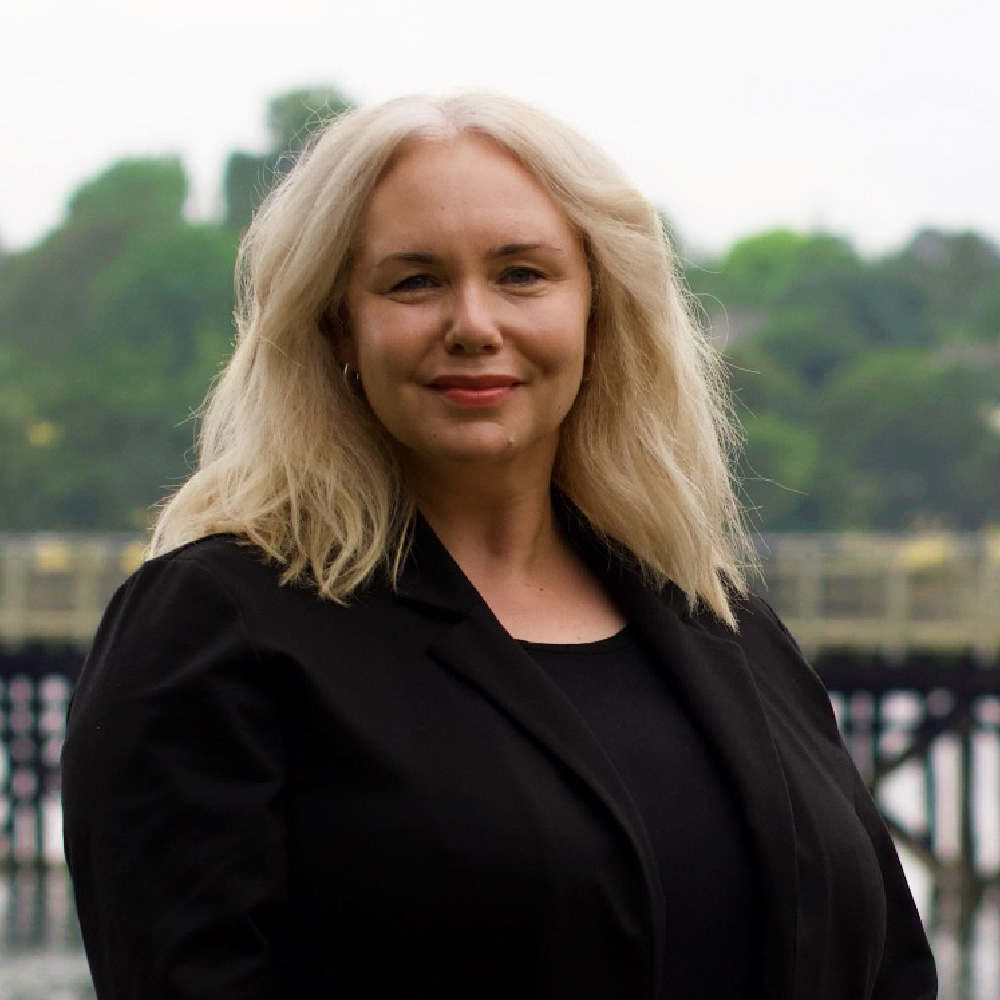
- Krieger in 2024

Minister of Public Safety and Solicitor General of British Columbia
- In office July 17, 2025 – November 20, 2026
- Premier: David Eby
- Preceded by: Garry Begg
- Succeeded by: Jessy Sahota

Parliamentary Secretary for Arts and Film of British Columbia
- In office November 18, 2024 – July 17, 2025
- Premier: David Eby
- Preceded by: Bob D'Eith
- Succeeded by: Position abolished

Member of the Legislative Assembly of British Columbia for Victoria-Swan Lake
- Incumbent
- Assumed office October 19, 2024
- Preceded by: Rob Fleming

Personal details
- Born: Vancouver, British Columbia, Canada
- Party: New Democratic
- Education: University of British Columbia (BA); London Consortium (MRes)

Nina Krieger is a Canadian politician who was elected to the Legislative Assembly of British Columbia in the 2024 general election. She represents the electoral district of Victoria-Swan Lake as a member of the British Columbia New Democratic Party. She served as Minister of Public Safety and Solicitor General in the government of David Eby.

== Early life and career ==
Krieger was born and raised in Vancouver, British Columbia, and now lives in Victoria.

She was previously the executive director of the Vancouver Holocaust Education Centre. While head of the VHEC, she appeared on the television program Nathan for You alongside Nathan Fielder in announcing the VHEC's collaboration with Summit Ice Apparel.

== Electoral record ==
2026 British Columbia general election: Victoria-Swan Lake
** Preliminary results — Not yet official **
Party	Candidate	Votes	%	±%
New Democratic	Nina Krieger	10,249	43.39	
Green	Carolyn Howe	8,356	35.38	
Conservative	Tim Taylor	4,963	21.01	
Total valid votes		23,568	99.79	
Total rejected ballots		50	0.21	
Turnout		23,618		
Registered voters				
New Democratic hold		Swing		−12.24
Source: Elections BC

2024 British Columbia general election: Victoria-Swan Lake
Party	Candidate	Votes	%	±%	Expenditures
New Democratic	Nina Krieger	14,273	56.0%	-3.35	
Green	Christina Winter	5,900	23.2%	-4.57	
Conservative	Tim Taylor	5,146	20.2%		
Communist	Robert Crooks	156	0.6%	+0.15	
Total valid votes		25,475	–		
Total rejected ballots					
Turnout					
Registered voters					
New Democratic hold		Swing		-11.78	
Source: Elections BC

== See also ==
- 43rd Parliament of British Columbia
