= Victoria (British Columbia provincial electoral district) =

Victoria was a provincial electoral district in the Canadian province of British Columbia, and was one of the first twelve ridings at the time of that province's joining Confederation in 1871 and stayed on the hustings until 1890. From 1894 to 1963 it did not appear on the electoral map. During that period the Victoria area was represented by North Victoria, South Victoria, Saanich, Esquimalt, Oak Bay and Victoria City. In 1966 the old Victoria City riding was redistributed and given the name of the old "rural" riding, Victoria.

== Notable MLAs ==
- Amor De Cosmos, 2nd Premier of British Columbia

== Electoral history ==
1871 British Columbia general election
Party	Candidate	Votes	%	Elected
Independent	Amor De Cosmos	151	40.05%	✓
Independent	Arthur Bunster	123	32.63%	✓
Independent	William Dalby	103	27.32%	
Total valid votes		377		

British Columbia provincial by-election, 26 November 1874 upon resignations of A. Bunster and A. De Cosmos
Party	Candidate	Votes	%	Elected
Independent	William Dalby	97	21.90%	
Independent	Charles William Horth	25	5.64%	
Independent	James Thomas McIlmoyl	72	16.25%	
Independent	William Archibald Robertson	108	24.38%	✓
Independent	William Fraser Tolmie	141	31.83%	✓
Total valid votes		443		
The byelection was due to resignations February 9, 1874 of A. Bunster and A. De Cosmos upon winning seats in the federal election January 22, 1874 (in Vancouver and Victoria federal ridings, respectively).

1875 British Columbia general election: Victoria
Party	Candidate	Votes	%	Elected
Reform caucus	Thomas Basil Humphreys	89	33.58	✓
Reform caucus	William Fraser Tolmie	65	24.53	✓
Independent	William Reay	51	19.25	
Independent	Noah Shakespeare	48	18.11	
Independent	Michael Baker	12	4.53	
Total valid votes		265	100.00	

1878 British Columbia general election: Victoria
Party	Candidate	Votes	%	Elected
Opposition	James Thomas McIlmoyl	102	20.06	✓
Opposition	Thomas Basil Humphreys	99	32.04	✓
Reform caucus	William Fraser Tolmie	62	20.06	
Independent	Thomas Lee	46	14.89	
Total valid votes		309	100.00	

British Columbia provincial by-election, 10 July 1878 due to Humphreys' appointment to cabinet
Party	Candidate	Votes
Independent	Thomas Basil Humphreys	Acclaimed
The byelection was called due to Humphreys' resignation upon his appointment to the Executive Council (cabinet) June 26, 1878. This byelection was one of a series held to confirm appointments to the Executive Council, which was the old parliamentary convention. As this byelection writ was filled by acclamation, no polling day was required and the seat was filled within two weeks. The stated date is the date the return of writs was received by the Chief Electoral Officer.

Note: Winners of each election are in bold.

4th British Columbia election, 1882
Party	Candidate	Votes	%	±	Expenditures
Government	Thomas Basil Humphreys	100	25.71%	–	unknown
Opposition	**Robert Franklin John**	**110**	**28.28%**	–	unknown
Government	James Thomas McIlmoyl	66	16.97%	–	unknown
Opposition	**George Archibald McTavish**	**113**	**29.05%**	–	unknown
Total valid votes		389			

5th British Columbia election, 1886
Party	Candidate	Votes	%	±	Expenditures
Government	**George William Anderson**	**134**	**27.07%**	–	unknown
Opposition	Thomas Basil Humphreys	113	22.83%	–	unknown
Government	**Robert Franklin John**	**166**	**33.53%**	–	unknown
Opposition	John Watts Sluggett	82	16.57%	–	unknown
Total valid votes		495	100.00%		
Total rejected ballots					
Turnout		%			

6th British Columbia election, 1890
Party	Candidate	Votes	%	±	Expenditures
Government	**George William Anderson**	**530**	**52.28%**	–	unknown
Opposition	Joseph Westrop Carey	115	24.89%	–	unknown
Government	**David McEwen Eberts**	**176**	**38.10%**	–	unknown
Total valid votes		462	100.00%		
Total rejected ballots					
Turnout		%			

For the 1894 election the Victoria riding was redistributed into North Victoria and South Victoria. The Victoria riding name did not reappear until the 1966 election. As before, it was a two-member seat:

28th British Columbia election, 1966
Party	Candidate	Votes	%	±	Expenditures
New Democratic	Harold Tuttle Alan	5,304	11.70%		unknown
New Democratic	Dorcas Blair	5,175	11.42%		unknown
Social Credit	**William Neelands Chant**	**13,068**	**28.84%**	–	unknown
Communist	Ernest Leon Knott	241	0.53%		unknown
Liberal	John W. Porteus	**4,774**	**10.54%**		unknown
Liberal	Frank D. Preston	4,597	10.14%		unknown
Social Credit	**Waldo McTavish Skillings**	**12,156**	**26.83%**	–	unknown
Total valid votes		45,315	100.00%		
Total rejected ballots		264			
Turnout		%			

29th British Columbia election, 1969
Party	Candidate	Votes	%	±	Expenditures
New Democratic	Peter G. Bunn	8,517	14.70%		unknown
Social Credit	**William Neelands Chant**	**15,899**	**27.43%**	–	unknown
Liberal	Mel Couvelier	4,497	7.76%		unknown
New Democratic	James Philip Fawcett	8,006	13.81%		unknown
Independent	William Alfred Scott	259	0.45%		unknown
Social Credit	**Waldo McTavish Skillings**	**15,443**	**26.65%**	–	unknown
Liberal	Ian Hugh Stewart	5,334	9.20%		unknown
Total valid votes		57,955	100.00%		
Total rejected ballots		496			
Turnout		%			

30th British Columbia election, 1972
Party	Candidate	Votes	%	±	Expenditures
Liberal	**David Alexander Anderson**	**10,750**	**16.00%**		unknown
Conservative	Edith Rose Sophia Gunning	7,843	11.67%		unknown
New Democratic	John David Hobson	6,887	10.25%		unknown
Liberal	Carron Baker Jameson	7,436	11.07%		
Social Credit	**Newell Orrin Ruston Morrison**	**10,840**	**16.14%**	–	unknown
New Democratic	Kathleen Ruff	6,981	10.39%		unknown
Conservative	Albert Clyde Savage	6,218	9.26%		unknown
Social Credit	Waldo McTavish Skillings	10,227	15.22%	–	unknown
Total valid votes		67,182	100.00%		
Total rejected ballots		497			
Turnout		%			

31st British Columbia election, 1975
Party	Candidate	Votes	%	±	Expenditures
Liberal	David Alexander Anderson	6,677	9.25 %		unknown
New Democratic	**Charles Frederick Barber**	**14,645**	**20.30** %		unknown
Social Credit	**Robert Samuel Bawlf**	**15,143**	**20.99%**	–	unknown
Conservative	William Loyd Burdon	2,558	3.55%		unknown
New Democratic	Gordon William Hanson	13,970	19.36%		unknown
Independent	Richard Owen Kavanagh	148	0.21%		unknown
Liberal	Terence Pitt O'Grady	3,102	4.30%		
Social Credit	Ian Douglas Rendle	13,374	18.54%	–	unknown
Independent	William Alfred Scott	349	0.48%		unknown
Conservative	Peter Bruce Stanley	2,179	3.02%		unknown
Total valid votes		72,145	100.00%		
Total rejected ballots		691			
Turnout		%			

32nd British Columbia election, 1979
Party	Candidate	Votes	%	±	Expenditures
New Democratic	**Charles Frederick Barber**	**22,700**	**28.26%**		unknown
Social Credit	Robert Samuel Bawlf	17,002	21.16%	–	unknown
Western Independence	Michael Edward Easton	275	0.34%		unknown
New Democratic	**Gordon William Hanson**	**20,226**	**25.18%**		unknown
Conservative	Jack Lindsay	2,195	2.73%		unknown
Conservative	Margaret M. (Maggi) Lynn	2,018	2.51%		unknown
Social Credit	Michael Dalway Watson (Mike) Young	15,923	19.82%	–	unknown
Total valid votes		80,339	100.00%		
Total rejected ballots		1,107			
Turnout		%			

33rd British Columbia election, 1983
Party	Candidate	Votes	%	±	Expenditures
New Democratic	**Robin Kyle Blencoe**	**23,787**	**28.62%**		unknown
Social Credit	Joe Easingwood	15,971	19.22%	–	unknown
New Democratic	**Gordon William Hanson**	**23,877**	**28.73%**		unknown
Independent	Balther Johannes Jensen	406	0.49%		unknown
Liberal	[Victor Evan Lindal	1,158	1.39%		unknown
Liberal	William John McElroy	1,271	1.53%		unknown
Independent	David Michael Shebib	242	0.29%		unknown
Social Credit	John McGrath Townson	15,352	18.47%	–	unknown
Western Canada Concept	Alice Mary (Alyson) Umpherson	1,048	1.26%		unknown
Total valid votes		83,112	100.00%		
Total rejected ballots		610			
Turnout		%			

34th British Columbia election, 1986
Party	Candidate	Votes	%	±	Expenditures
Liberal	David C. Bibby	2,257	2.82%		unknown
New Democratic	**Robin Kyle Blencoe**	**21,320**	**26.64%**		unknown
New Democratic	**Gordon William Hanson**	**21,395**	**26.74%**		unknown
Independent	Balther Johannes Jensen	215	0.27%		unknown
Liberal	Tom W. Morino	2,235	2.79%		unknown
Green	[Laura Kathryn Porcher	693	0.87%	–	unknown
Social Credit	Roger W. Skillings	16,132	20.16%	–	unknown
Social Credit	Paul Yewchuck	15,776	19.71%	–	unknown
Total valid votes		80,023	100.00%		
Total rejected ballots		748			
Turnout		%			

== Sources ==
- Elections BC Historical Returns
- Electoral History of British Columbia, 1871-1986
