= Waldo McTavish Skillings =

Canadian politician

MLA for Victoria City and Victoria
- In office 1960–1972

Personal details
- Born: September 9, 1906 Port Elgin, Ontario
- Died: November 6, 1981 (aged 75) Victoria, British Columbia
- Party: British Columbia Social Credit Party

Waldo McTavish Skillings (September 9, 1906 – November 6, 1981) was an insurance agent and political figure in British Columbia. After an unsuccessful run in the 1941 provincial election as a Conservative candidate, he represented Victoria City from 1960 to 1966 and Victoria from 1966 to 1972 in the Legislative Assembly of British Columbia as a Social Credit member.

He was born in Port Elgin, Ontario, the son of Waldo Skillings and Margaret McTavish, and was educated at Victoria College and the Victoria normal school. In 1937, Skillings married Helen Bowden Harris. He was an agent for Great West Life. Skillings served as an alderman for the city of Victoria. He was government whip and also served in the provincial cabinet as Minister of Industrial Development, Trade and Commerce. He was defeated when he ran for reelection to the provincial assembly in 1972.

He died in 1981 of heart failure.
