= Sierra Youth Coalition =

Canadian national youth organization

The Sierra Youth Coalition (SYC) (French: Coalition jeunesse Sierra) is a national Canadian organization run by youth for youth, founded in 1996, and serving as the youth arm of the Sierra Club of Canada Foundation. Its stated mission is "to empower Canadians ages 14-26 to become active community leaders who contribute to making Canada a sustainable society." SYC was founded in 1996 by Amelia Clarke. Its members range in age from 15 to 30 years old.

== Programs ==
SYC has various projects (Sustainable Campuses, Community Youth Action Gatherings, Sustainable High Schools, Education Fund) and campaigns (To the Tar Sands, Deconstructing Dinner Caravan). A history of campaigns and other initiatives is available on their website.

The Sustainable Campuses Project operates on over 70 Canadian post-secondary campuses. This project uses a 170 Indicator assessment of sustainability, called the Campus Sustainability Assessment Framework. This tool was developed by Lindsay Cole as a Master's Thesis at Royal Roads University. The project also conducts greenhouse gas emissions inventories and functions via student leadership. Sustainable Campuses currently has a certification program for post secondary campuses in Quebec.

Youth Action Gatherings are annual summer activist training camps that engage youth aged 14 to 19 in various cities across Canada.

The Sustainable High Schools Project is a program adapted from the Sustainable Campuses Project, training students to improve their school's sustainability. This program is currently active in the Ottawa region and in various locations in British Columbia.

A component of the High Schools program is the High School Climate Challenge (HSCC) The SYC and Clean Air Champions (CAC) are partners in the High School Climate Challenge (HSCC). HSCC trains youth to lead in-school greenhouse gas emissions audits using an online calculator, and develop strategies and actions to reduce the ecological impact of the school institutions and activities. HSCC launched a pilot program in fall 2008 in Toronto and Ottawa.

SYC has a history of engaging in issue-based campaigns (Keep Kyoto, Save Hockey: Fight Climate Change, It's My Future, Climate Change Caravan).

== Recognition ==
In 2005, Sierra Youth Coalition received an award for the best environmental educator at the regional level from the North American Association for Environmental Education.

In 2007, the Ontario Trillium Foundation honoured SYC with its Great Grants Award for the environment sector, in celebration of the foundation's 25 years of philanthropy.

In 2008, Jack Layton, the leader of the New Democratic Party dedicated the passing of Bill C-377 to the Sierra Youth Coalition for the efforts SYC put into its passing. An election was called and C-377 was lost before it was enshrined into law.

== See also ==
- Environmental groups and resources serving K–12 schools
- Environmental movement
