= Asia-Pacific Partnership on Clean Development and Climate =

International non-treaty agreement

Map showing the members of the APP

APP countries:

- Australia
- Canada
- China
- India
- Japan
- South Korea
- United States

The Asia-Pacific Partnership on Clean Development and Climate, also known as APP, was an international, voluntary, public-private partnership among Australia, Canada, India, Japan, the People's Republic of China, South Korea, and the United States announced July 28, 2005, at an Association of South East Asian Nations (ASEAN) Regional Forum meeting and launched on January 12, 2006, at the Partnership's inaugural Ministerial meeting in Sydney. As of April 5, 2011, the Partnership formally concluded although a number of individual projects continue. The conclusion of the APP and cancellation of many of its projects attracted almost no media comment.

Foreign, Environment and Energy Ministers from partner countries agreed to co-operate on the development and transfer of technology which enables reduction of greenhouse gas emissions that is consistent with and complementary to the UN Framework Convention on Climate Change and other relevant international instruments, and is intended to complement but not replace the Kyoto Protocol. Ministers agreed to a Charter, Communique and Work Plan that "outline a ground-breaking new model of private-public task forces to address climate change, energy security and air pollution."

Member countries account for over 50% of the world's greenhouse gas emissions, energy consumption, GDP and population. Unlike the Kyoto Protocol (currently unratified by the United States), which imposes mandatory limits on greenhouse gas emissions, the Partnership engages member countries to accelerate the development and deployment of clean energy technologies, with no mandatory enforcement mechanism. This has led to criticism that the Partnership is worthless, by other governments, climate scientists and environmental groups. Proponents, on the other hand, argue that unrestricted economic growth and emission reductions can only be brought about through active engagement by all major polluters, which includes India and China, within the Kyoto Protocol framework neither India nor China are yet required to reduce emissions.

Canada became the 7th member of the APP at the Second Ministerial Meeting in New Delhi on October 15, 2007. Canada's Prime Minister Stephen Harper earlier expressed his intention to join the Partnership in August 2007, despite some domestic opposition.

== Aims ==
U.S. former President George W. Bush called it a "new results-oriented partnership" that he said "will allow our nations to develop and accelerate deployment of cleaner, more efficient energy technologies to meet national pollution reduction, energy security and climate change concerns in ways that reduce poverty and promote economic development." John Howard, the former Australian Prime Minister, described the pact as "fair and effective".

However, the Worldwide Fund for Nature stated that "a deal on climate change that doesn't limit pollution is the same as a peace plan that allows guns to be fired" whilst the British Governments' chief scientific adviser, Sir David King, in a BBC interview said he doubted the new deal could work without setting caps on emissions, but added it should be seen as a sign of progress on climate change. Compared to the Kyoto Protocol, which so far requires no emission reductions from India and China, the APP actively engages both countries through building market incentives to reduce greenhouse emissions along with building capacity and providing clean technology transfers. Proponents argue that this approach creates a greater likelihood that both India and China will, sooner rather than later, effectively cut their greenhouse emissions even though they are not required to do so under the Kyoto Protocol.

== Areas for collaboration ==
The intent is to create a voluntary, non-legally binding framework for international cooperation to facilitate the development, diffusion, deployment, and transfer of existing, emerging and longer term cost-effective, cleaner, more efficient technologies and practices among the Partners through concrete and substantial cooperation so as to achieve practical results; promote and create enabling environments to assist in such efforts; facilitate attainment of the Partners' respective national pollution reduction, energy security and climate change objectives; and provide a forum for exploring the Partners' respective policy approaches relevant to addressing interlinked development, energy, environment, and climate change issues within the context of clean development goals, and for sharing experiences in developing and implementing respective national development and energy strategies.

The Partnership's inaugural Ministerial meeting established eight government/business taskforces through its Work Plan, posted on the APP website.

1. cleaner fossil energy
2. renewable energy and distributed generation
3. power generation and transmission
4. steel
5. aluminum
6. cement
7. coal mining
8. buildings and appliances

== Ministerial meetings ==
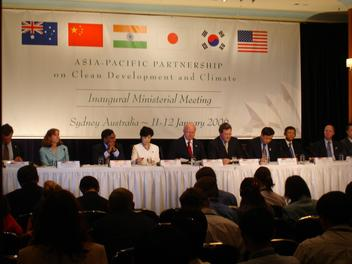
Inaugural Ministerial Meeting in Sydney, January 2006

The inaugural ministerial meeting was held at the Four Seasons Hotel and Government House in Sydney, Australia, on January 11 and 12, 2006.

Asia-Pacific Partnership Ministers agreed and released a:

- Charter that provides the framework and structure of the Partnership;
- Communiqué that highlights key outcomes from this meeting; and
- Work Plan that maps out an intensive agenda of work for the taskforces in the near-term.

Partnership Ministers met again in New Delhi, India, on October 15, 2007, and released a second communique and admitted Canada as a Partner. The ministers also met in Shanghai, China, on October 26–27, 2009, where they discussed the accomplishments of the Partnership since the New Delhi Ministerial, and received the results of a report analyzing and evaluating the progress of the APP flagship projects.

== Criticism ==
The Partnership has been criticized by environmentalists who have rebuked the proceedings as ineffectual without mandatory limits on greenhouse-gas emissions. A coalition of national environment groups and networks from all of the APP countries issued a challenge to their governments to make the APP meaningful by agreeing to mandatory targets, creating financial mechanisms with incentives for the dissemination of clean energy technologies, and create an action plan to overcome the key barriers to technology transfer. U.S. Senator John McCain said the Partnership "[amounted] to nothing more than a nice little public relations ploy", while the Economist described the Partnership as "patent fig-leaf for the refusal of America and Australia to ratify Kyoto".

== Successes ==
Proponents of the Partnership have lauded the APP's achievements since its inception in 2006. In its over three years, the Partnership has established a record of achievement in promoting collaboration between our governments and private sector in key energy-intensive sectors and activities. The Partnership has worked to develop and implement detailed action plans across key sectors of the energy economy, and to date has endorsed 175 collaborative projects including 22 flagship projects across all the seven Partner countries. These projects have, inter alia, helped power plant managers improve the efficiency of their operations, trained cement plant operators how to save energy at their facilities, assisted in pushing solar photovoltaics toward commercialization, and improved design, equipment and operations of buildings and appliances. The Partnership has been widely noted for its innovative work in public-private sector cooperation, and stands as an example of the benefits of international cooperative efforts in addressing climate change.
