= World Trade University =

World Trade University is a failed private university in British Columbia, Canada. Launched in 2001, the university withdrew its application for degree-granting status in 2008 and "has yet to open".

The university was created via a private member's bill of the British Columbia government—an act that the Confederation of University Faculty Associations of B.C. (CUFABC) is requesting to be rescinded.

The British Columbia government "erroneously" described the university as a "United Nations mechanism", and the university web site removed logos of the World Bank and the United Nations after those institutions denied that they had partnerships with the university. The university is located in a former military base, CFB Chilliwack, renovated at a cost of $1 million paid by the city.

An August 2008 article in the National Post concluded that the story of this institution "reflected badly on the B.C. government."
