= Newell Morrison =

Canadian politician

Newell Orrin Ruston Morrison

MLA for Victoria
- In office 1972–1975

Personal details
- Born: July 28, 1924 Chongqing Hills, China
- Died: July 31, 2013 (aged 89) Victoria, British Columbia
- Party: Social Credit Party of British Columbia
- Spouse: Marjorie Mary Dunn

Newell Orrin Ruston Morrison (July 28, 1924 – July 31, 2013) was a Canadian politician. He served in the Legislative Assembly of British Columbia from 1972 to 1975, as a Social Credit member for the constituency of Victoria.

Newell, a long-time resident of Victoria, British Columbia, was well known as an auto dealer, entrepreneur, MLA for Victoria and CEO of BC Development Corp. His interests included flying, having trained as a WWII RCAF pilot; a lifelong love of cars, travel and most importantly his love of family.
