= Gordon William Hanson =

Canadian politician (1943–2020)

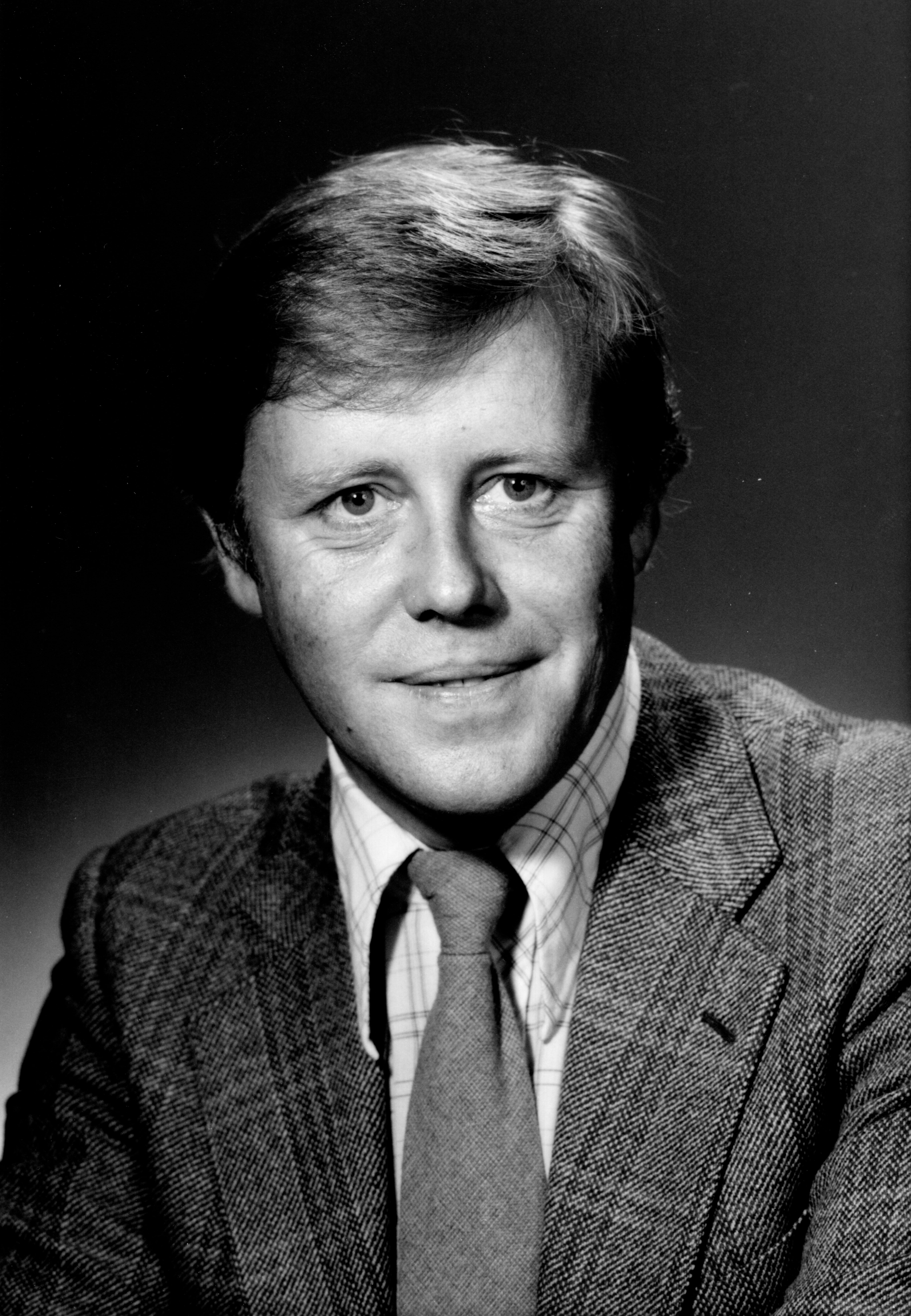

MLA for Victoria
- In office 1979–1991

Personal details
- Born: July 18, 1943 Vancouver, British Columbia
- Died: August 30, 2020 (aged 77)
- Party: British Columbia New Democratic Party

Gordon William Hanson (July 18, 1943 – August 30, 2020) was a Canadian politician. He served in the Legislative Assembly of British Columbia from 1979 to 1991, as a NDP member for the constituency of Victoria.
