= Charles Frederick Barber =

Canadian politician (born 1949)

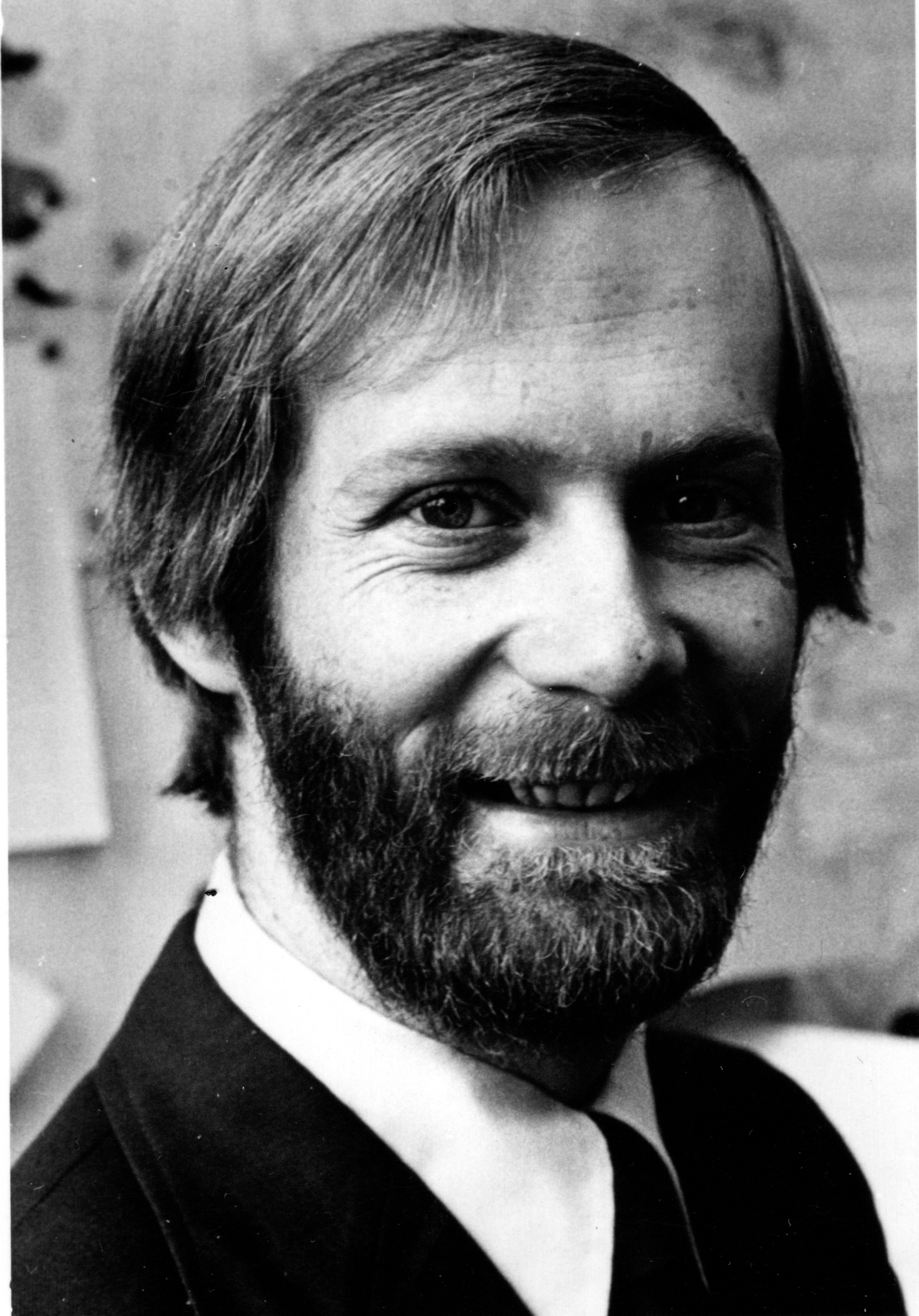

MLA for Victoria
- In office 1975–1983

Personal details
- Born: June 19, 1949 (age 76) Victoria, British Columbia
- Party: British Columbia New Democratic Party

Charles Frederick Barber (born June 19, 1949) is a former Canadian politician. He served in the Legislative Assembly of British Columbia from 1975 to 1983 as an NDP member for the constituency of Victoria.

In 2000, Barber was fined $1,500 for gross indecency involving a 15-year-old boy in the 1970s. Barber had invited a homeless teenager to his home where he engaged him in sexual activities. Barber apologized for what he called a mistake in judgement.

After leaving politics, Barber became a music producer in California.
