= Sierra Club Canada =

Canadian environmental organization

Sierra Club Canada Foundation
- Abbreviation: SCCF
- Formation: 1971
- Type: Environmental organization based in Canada
- Legal status: Active
- Purpose: Environmental activism
- Headquarters: Ottawa, Ontario, Canada
- Region served: Canada
- Members: 10,000
- Official language: English, French
- Website: www.sierraclub.ca

The Sierra Club Canada Foundation (SCCF) is a Canadian environmental organization made up of a national branch and five chapters in Ontario, Atlantic Canada, Québec, the Prairies, and a nation-wide Youth chapter. The organization's mission is to 'empower people to be leaders in protecting, restoring and enjoying healthy and safe ecosystems.'

== History ==
The SCCF is one of three organizations with the name 'Sierra Club' which, though they sometimes work together on environmental causes, are separate entities. Terry A. Simmons incorporated the Sierra Club BC in 1969, affiliating the local organization with the Sierra Club of the United States. After that time several other chapters formed in the rest of Canada and these later became the Sierra Club Canada Foundation, an independent Canadian Sierra Club operating on a national basis and locally from the Prairies in the West to Atlantic Canada in the East, with the local BC organization remaining a separate entity.

The Sierra Club Canada Foundation was legally incorporated as a Canadian organization in July 1971.

As of 2010, it has around approximately 10,000 members and supporters with its head office in Ottawa.

== Background ==
As of 2023, the Sierra Club Canada Foundation is involved in a number of high-profile campaigns, for example, playing a central role in an international campaign against Equinor's proposed offshore oil projects such as the Bay du Nord oil project in Canada, and a role in a campaign against the Line 5 oil pipeline. The SCCF is also part of court challenge against the Bay du Nord oil project. In 2022 the organization and its members helped win an expanded plastic ban in Canada to include exports of plastic items.

At the local level its chapters are involved in a number of initiatives from opposing coal mining and power and advocating for renewable energy democracy in the Atlantic Chapter, to monitoring air quality and planting trees in Ontario. The Ottawa-based Breath Easy program of the Ontario Chapter was responsible for providing air quality monitors to CBC News journalists during the Canada convoy protest, which showed that PM 2.5 air pollution levels (pollution which can have serious health effects and can make its way into people's homes) ranged from four to eight times higher than normal for the area.

The Prairie Chapter works on issues such as wetland and grassland conservation and community gardens, while the Quebec Chapter works to counter fossil fuel projects, raise local community environmental awareness, and works with municipalities to advance conservation efforts to protect migratory birds. The Youth Chapter of the organization, based throughout the country, runs a podcast which has interviewed prominent Canadian political figures such as Elizabeth May, Laurel Collins, and Monique Pauzé.

The Wild Child outdoor education programs of the SCCF have gotten children outdoors for thousands of hours in Alberta, PEI, Nova Scotia.

== Organization ==
Sierra Club Canada is governed by a Board of Directors, board members are elected by members at the SCCF's Annual General Meeting.

SCCF currently has five Chapters (Atlantic, Ontario, Prairies, and Quebec) and the Sierra Youth Coalition. It has offices in Edmonton, Halifax, Montreal, and Toronto.

In addition, SCCF includes several local groups working mostly at the municipal level.

== Executive Directors ==
1. 1989–2006: Elizabeth May
2. 2006–2009: Stephen Hazell
3. 2009–2015: John Bennett
4. 2016–present: Gretchen Fitzgerald

== Affiliates and subsidiaries ==
The Sierra Youth Coalition is the youth-led wing of Sierra Club Canada.

== Work ==
Sierra Club Canada has influenced environmental policy and legislative initiatives. The following list of milestones provides some of the campaigns that Sierra Club has been involved in, both in coalition with others and as a leading advocate.

2009

- Reducing smog pollution – Sierra Club Canada initiated and led a joint industry/environmental group coalition that brought together provincial and federal governments with other stakeholders in a collaboration for a comprehensive federal and provincial regulatory regime to improve air quality standards, an air zone approach to managing air quality, and a multi-stakeholder Air Quality Council to oversee the regime.
- Raising public awareness about oil sands development - Sierra Club Canada and Sierra Club Prairie raised public awareness about the adverse environmental impacts of oil sands development.

2008

- Stopping the Digby Neck Basalt Quarry and Marine Terminal - Working closely with local citizens' groups, Sierra Club Canada and Sierra Club Atlantic persuaded an environmental review panel to oppose construction of a basalt quarry and marine terminal, the ships from which would have damaged threatened right whales and damaged a community committed to sustainability. The federal and Nova Scotian governments accepted the panel's recommendations; the quarry and terminal were never built.
- Ensuring that greenhouse gas emissions are assessed in oil sands projects - Sierra Club Canada won a lawsuit in the Federal Court of Canada requiring that greenhouse gas emissions are assessed as part of the federal environment assessment for an oil sands mine, specifically the Kearl Oil Sands Project.

2007

- The cleanup of the Sydney Tar Ponds in Nova Scotia will not include an incinerator for toxic waste, which would have further polluted local communities.
- The Mackenzie Gas Project has been delayed for five years and may never be built.
- Federal funding has been committed to protect the Great Bear Rainforest in British Columbia, which is a quarter of the Earth's remaining ancient coastal temperate rainforests.
- Phase-out of a federal tax subsidy to oil sands companies, as well as growing support for a moratorium on new Alberta tar sands projects.

2006

- The announcement that two million hectares of temperate rainforest would be protected from logging. The Great Bear Rainforest announcement is British Columbia's decade-long effort that saw blockades, international markets campaigns, and an agreement between as unlikely allies as logging companies and environmentalists.

2005

- Stopping proposal to transport Great Lakes water out of the watershed via the Sustainable Water Resources Agreement.
- Achieving the commitment to a minimum of 5 percent mix of biofuels in gasoline and diesel by the end of 2010.
- The passage of Bill C-15, which is designed to bring an end to the dumping of bilge oil from ships, which results in the deaths of some 300,000 seabirds annually off the coast of Newfoundland alone.

2004

- Both the Ontario Government and the federal government accepted Sierra Club Canada's position against any diversions from the Great Lakes. The plan to allow diversions was halted. The Sierra Club was the first environmental group to identify the proposed Annex from the Council of Great Lakes Governors as a major threat to the lakes.
- The federal Ministers of Environment and Natural Resources jointly committed to push the car makers to 25% decreases in greenhouse gas emissions by 2010, directly in response to a Sierra Club of Canada campaign.
- The British Columbia government received a report from public hearings, chaired by Roland Priddle, clearly stating that British Columbians were massively opposed to lifting the moratorium on offshore oil and gas development. SCC and BC Chapter had been heavily involved in the coalition opposing oil and gas.
- The Quebec environmental assessment agency (Bureau d'Audiences Publique -BAPE) issued a report harshly critical of the threat to whales from seismic testing – the first step in oil and gas exploration – an issue which SCC had been coordinating. The Quebec government blocked testing at the mouth of the St. Lawrence in the Gulf.
- After years of pressure, the federal government came through with $4 billion for the clean-up of toxic waste sites, with a very specific mention of the need to clean up the Sydney Tar Ponds. By May, the federal and provincial governments signed a $400 million agreement to clean up the notorious 300-acre (1.2 km^{2}) toxic site. SCC has been the only environmental group, national or provincial, championing the plight of the local environment and Sydney residents.
- The precedent created by Sierra Club of Canada's victory in the Federal Court, quashing a permit for a massive mussel aquaculture facility in Cape Breton, was preserved when the company dropped its appeal. Although the aquaculture facility is proceeding under a new permit, it has been forced to adopt a phased approach.
- Nine municipalities drafted pesticide by-laws, and five adopted them in 2004. Often their efforts were supported by local volunteers. A total of 70 municipalities now have by-laws restricting the use of toxic chemical pesticides for cosmetic purposes.

2003

- Passage of Species at Risk Act
- Reform of the Pest Control Products Act
- Pesticide bylaws in 65 municipalities to date
- Sierra Club successfully intervenes in Supreme Court of Canada which upholds Canadian Patent Board's refusal to patent Oncomouse (Harvard Mouse Case).
- $4 billion committed to Toxic Waste Site Clean Up in the federal budget
- Sierra Club was the only intervener in environmental hearings in Fort McMurray appearing to oppose any expansion in the Athbasca Tar Sands.
- Arctic National Wildlife Refuge protected another year
- Failure of the WTO in September in Cancun
- Key role in developing a strong new National Forest Strategy

== ITER project ==
In 2003, Sierra Club Canada lobbied extensively to stop Canadian participation in the ITER project. The SCC, arguing that the research project was a subsidy, influenced public opinion against the project. Canada is now no longer involved in ITER.

== Archives ==
There is a Sierra Club Canada fonds at Library and Archives Canada. The archival reference number is R8161.
