= Douglas Albert Munro =

U.S. Coast Guard Medal of Honor recipient (1919–1942)

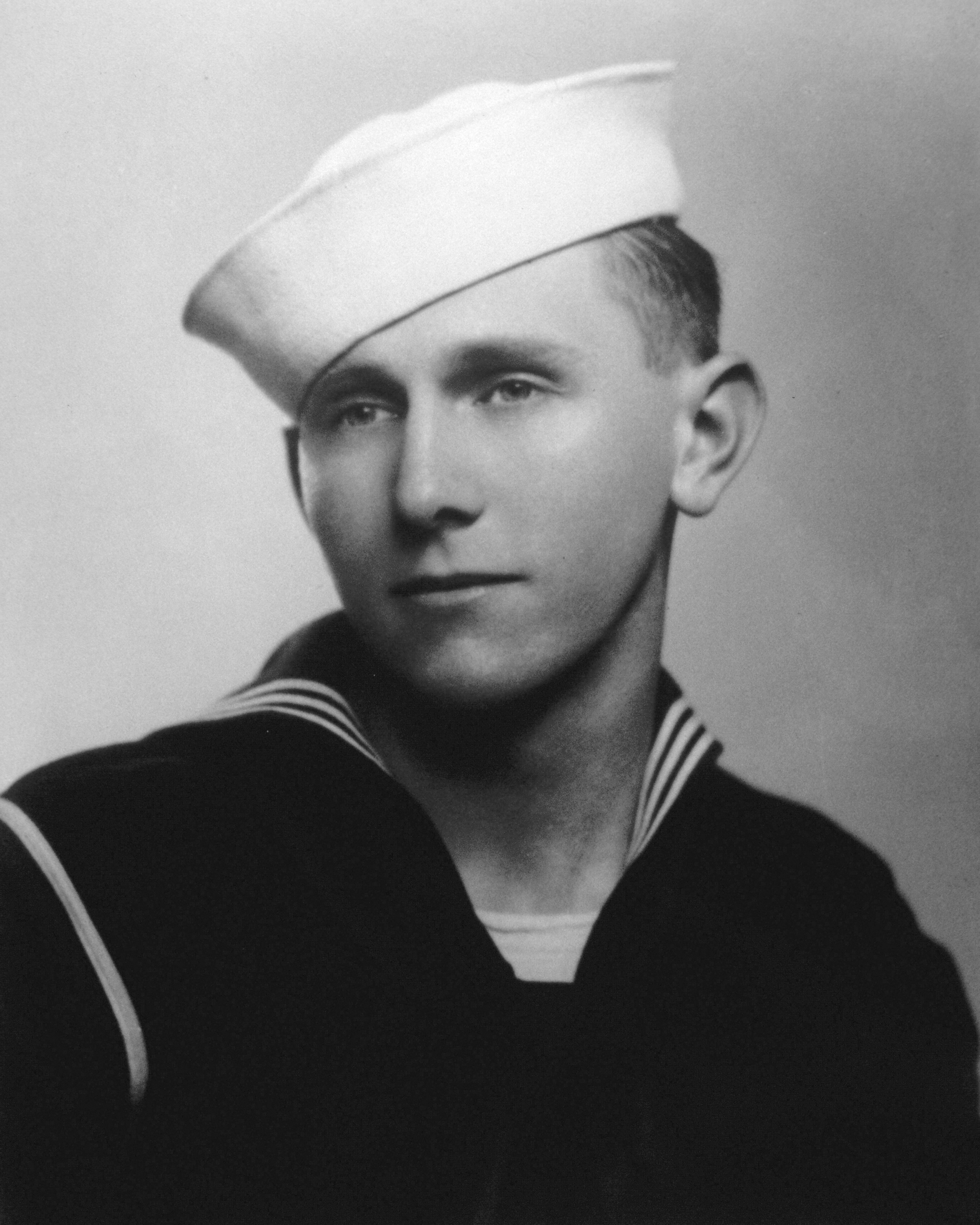
- Born: October 11, 1919; Vancouver, Canada
- Died: September 27, 1942 (aged 22); Matanikau River, Guadalcanal, Solomon Islands
- Burial place: Laurel Hill Memorial Park, Cle Elum, Washington, United States
- Relatives: Edith Munro (mother); Francis Fairey (uncle)
- Military career
- Allegiance: United States
- Branch: United States Coast Guard
- Service years: 1939–1942
- Rank: Signalman first class
- Nickname: "The Gold Dust Twins" (with Ray Evans)
- Service number: 217–739
- Conflicts: World War II; Pacific War; Solomon Islands Campaign; Guadalcanal campaign; Battle of Tulagi and Gavutu–Tanambogo; Actions along the Matanikau (DOW)
- Awards: Medal of Honor; Purple Heart
- Memorials: Douglas Munro Memorial (Honiara, Solomon Islands); Douglas Munro Memorial (Crystal River, Florida); Douglas Munro Burial Site (Cle Elum, Washington); Douglas Munro statue (Cape May, New Jersey); Douglas Munro bust (Washington, D.C.)

Douglas Albert Munro (October 11, 1919 – September 27, 1942) was a United States Coast Guardsman who was posthumously decorated with the Medal of Honor for an act of "extraordinary heroism" during World War II. He is the only person to have received the medal for actions performed during service in the Coast Guard. (Note: Marcus Hanna of the United States Lighthouse Board received the Medal of Honor for bravery in action at the siege of Port Hudson while serving with a Massachusetts Militia regiment in the Union Army.)

Munro was born in Canada to an American father and a British mother, and his family moved to the United States when he was a child. He was raised in South Cle Elum, Washington, and attended Central Washington College of Education before volunteering for military service shortly before the United States entered World War II. Munro and his shipmate Raymond Evans were known as the Gold Dust Twins, so-called because they were inseparable.

During the Guadalcanal campaign, Munro was assigned to Naval Operating Base Cactus at Lunga Point, where small boat operations were coordinated. At the Second Battle of the Matanikau in September 1942, he led the extrication of a force of Marines whose position had been overrun by Japanese forces. He died of a gunshot wound at age 22 while using the Higgins boat that he was piloting to shield a landing craft filled with Marines from Japanese fire.

Several ships, buildings, and monuments have been dedicated to Munro, and a street in his hometown is named after him. The anniversary of his death is annually observed in Cle Elum and at Coast Guard Training Center Cape May. His grave has been designated a historical site by Washington state. He is the namesake of the Douglas A. Munro Coast Guard Headquarters Building, Munro Hall at the U.S. Coast Guard Academy, the "Douglas Munro March", the Navy League's Douglas A. Munro Award, the Coast Guard Foundation's Douglas Munro Scholarship Fund, and the Veterans of Foreign Wars' Douglas Munro–Robert H. Brooks Post. He is the only non-Marine to have his name enshrined on the Wall of Heroes of the National Museum of the Marine Corps.

== Early life and education ==
=== Family ===
Munro's father, James Munro, was born in Sacramento, California as James Wilkins. By age eight he had moved to Canada; his divorced mother remarried a Canadian citizen whose surname he took. (Note: During World War II, James Munro served as a captain in the Washington State Guard. The Washington State Guard was a home guard raised by Washington due to what historian Barry Stentiford has described as its "insecurities over its exposed location" and a concern by Governor of Washington Clarence D. Martin that the state would be unable to defend itself from invasion while the Washington National Guard was mustered into federal service.) Munro's mother, Edith Fairey, was born in Liverpool, England, and—in childhood—relocated with her family to Canada. (Note: Edith Fairey's father, William Joseph Thrower Fairey, served in the British Army's 15th Lancashire Rifles. Her brother, Francis Fairey, was a military chaplain in World War I and was later commanding officer of the Irish Fusiliers of Canada. From 1953 to 1957 Francis Fairey sat in the House of Commons of Canada representing Victoria, British Columbia, as a member of the Liberal Party. He would also serve as deputy minister of education in the British Columbia provincial government. Following the death of her son, then 48-year-old Edith Munro joined the Coast Guard Women's Reserve (SPARS). She was trained at the U.S. Coast Guard Academy and commissioned lieutenant junior grade on May 27, 1943, eventually commanding the Coast Guard women's barracks in Seattle. Her commissioning oath was administered by Rear Admiral Lloyd Chalker, Vice Commandant of the United States Coast Guard.) James Munro and Fairey married in 1914 at Christ Church Cathedral in Vancouver; under U.S. naturalization laws at the time, Fairey automatically assumed American citizenship upon her marriage to Munro.

=== Youth, schooling, and enlistment ===
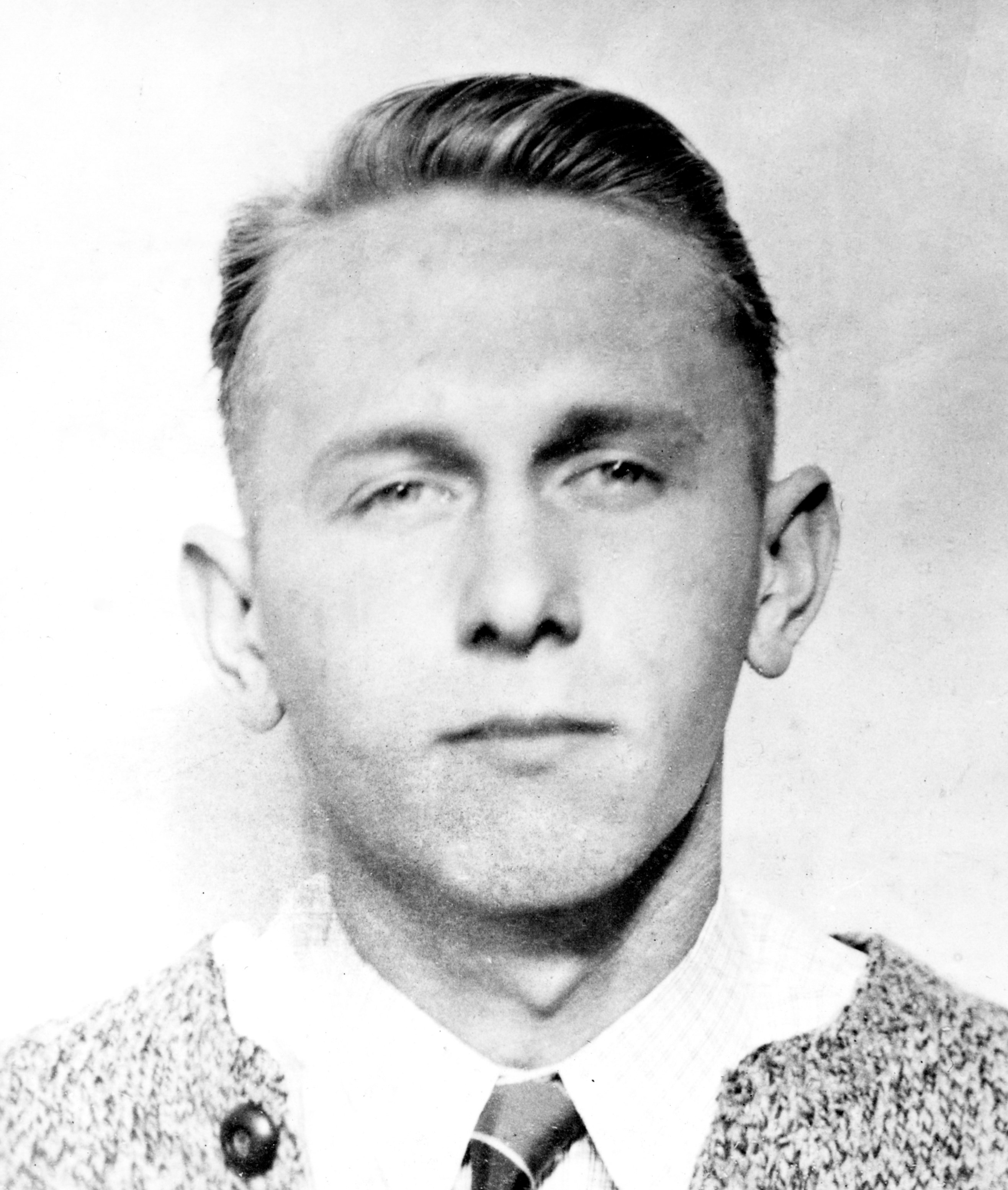
Munro pictured in 1939

Douglas Albert Munro was born on October 11, 1919, in Vancouver, British Columbia. His father repatriated his family from Canada to the United States in 1922, settling in South Cle Elum, Washington, where he was employed as an electrician. Munro was baptized at the Holy Nativity Episcopal Church in South Cle Elum.

In his youth Munro showed a high level of musical aptitude, playing percussion, trumpet, and harmonica. He performed in a drum and bugle corps sponsored by the American Legion, the Sons of the American Legion Drum and Bugle Corps, eventually becoming the corps' drillmaster. Munro was also a member of Cle Elum's Boy Scout Troop 84. He attended Cle Elum High School, where he was a member of the school's wrestling team. Following his 1937 high school graduation, Munro enrolled in the Central Washington College of Education due to its proximity to Cle Elum, so that he could continue performing in the Sons of the American Legion. Munro was a yell king (a male cheerleader) at Central Washington.

In 1939, with the threat of war growing, Munro decided to withdraw from college and enlist in the military. He reportedly told his sister he had chosen the Coast Guard because its primary mission was saving lives. Slightly built, Munro spent the week before his induction eating heavily to meet the Coast Guard's minimum weight standard. He spent most of his last night in Cle Elum with his friend Marion "Mike" Cooley, with whom, according to Munro's biographer, Gary Williams, he had been "almost inseparable" since childhood.

Munro underwent entrance processing in Seattle, where he met and became friends with Ray Evans. Munro would spend the rest of his Coast Guard career with Evans, and the pair became known to shipmates as "the Gold Dust Twins". (Note: The term "gold dust twins" is a sobriquet generally meaning "a pair of inseparable and indefatigable workers". It references the mascots of Fairbank's Gold Dust Washing Powder.)

== Career ==
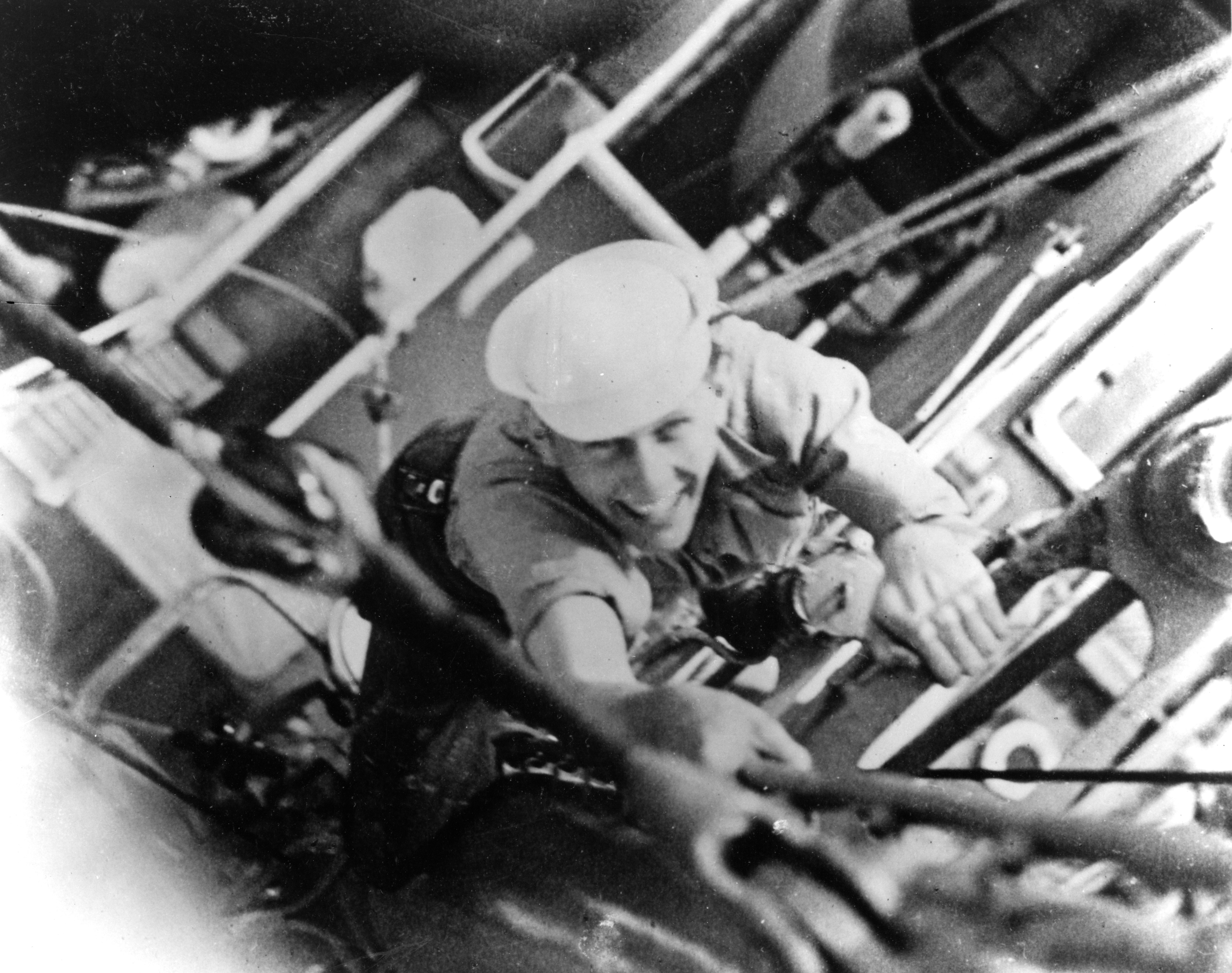
Douglas Munro pictured aboard a ship

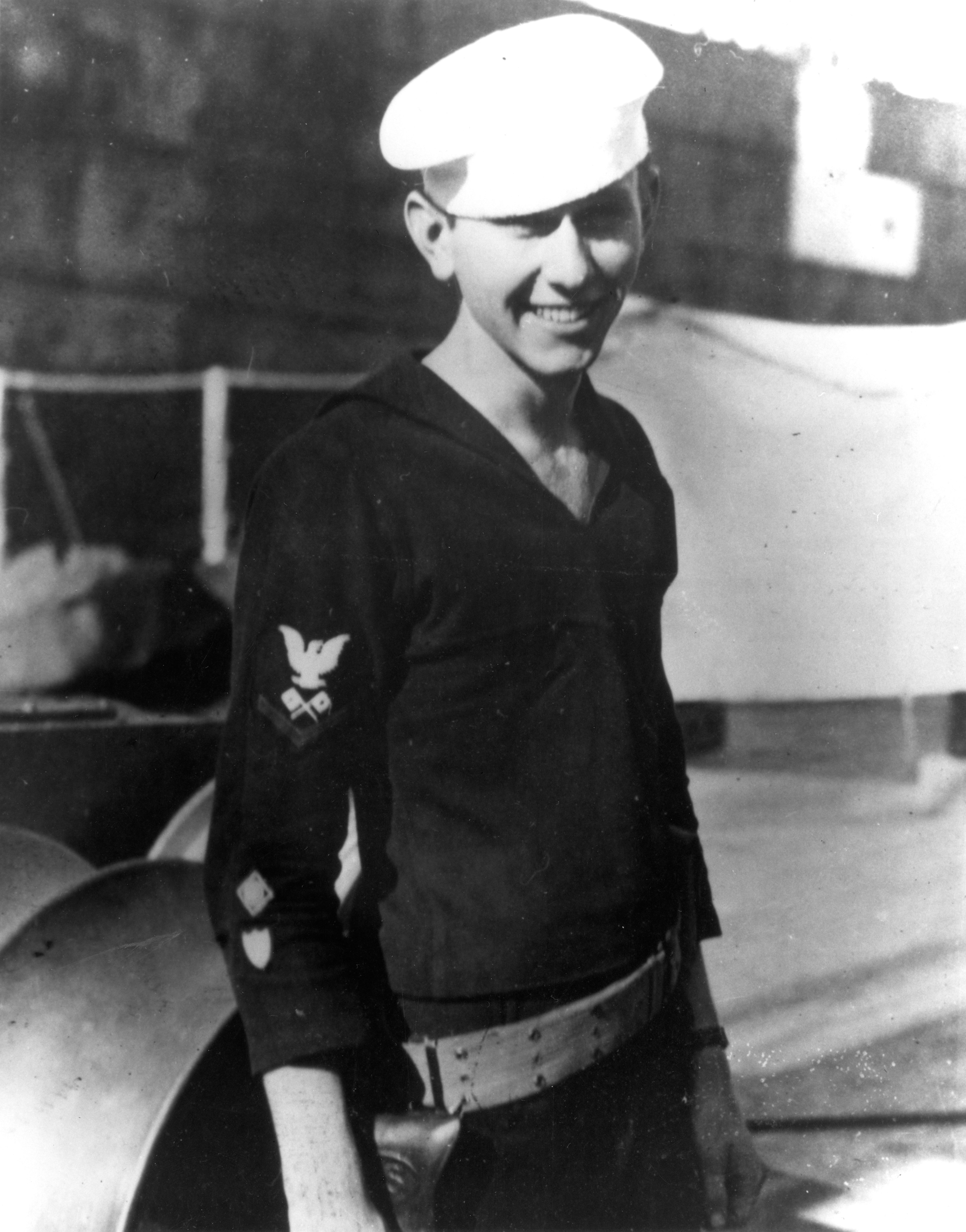
Munro pictured in about 1940

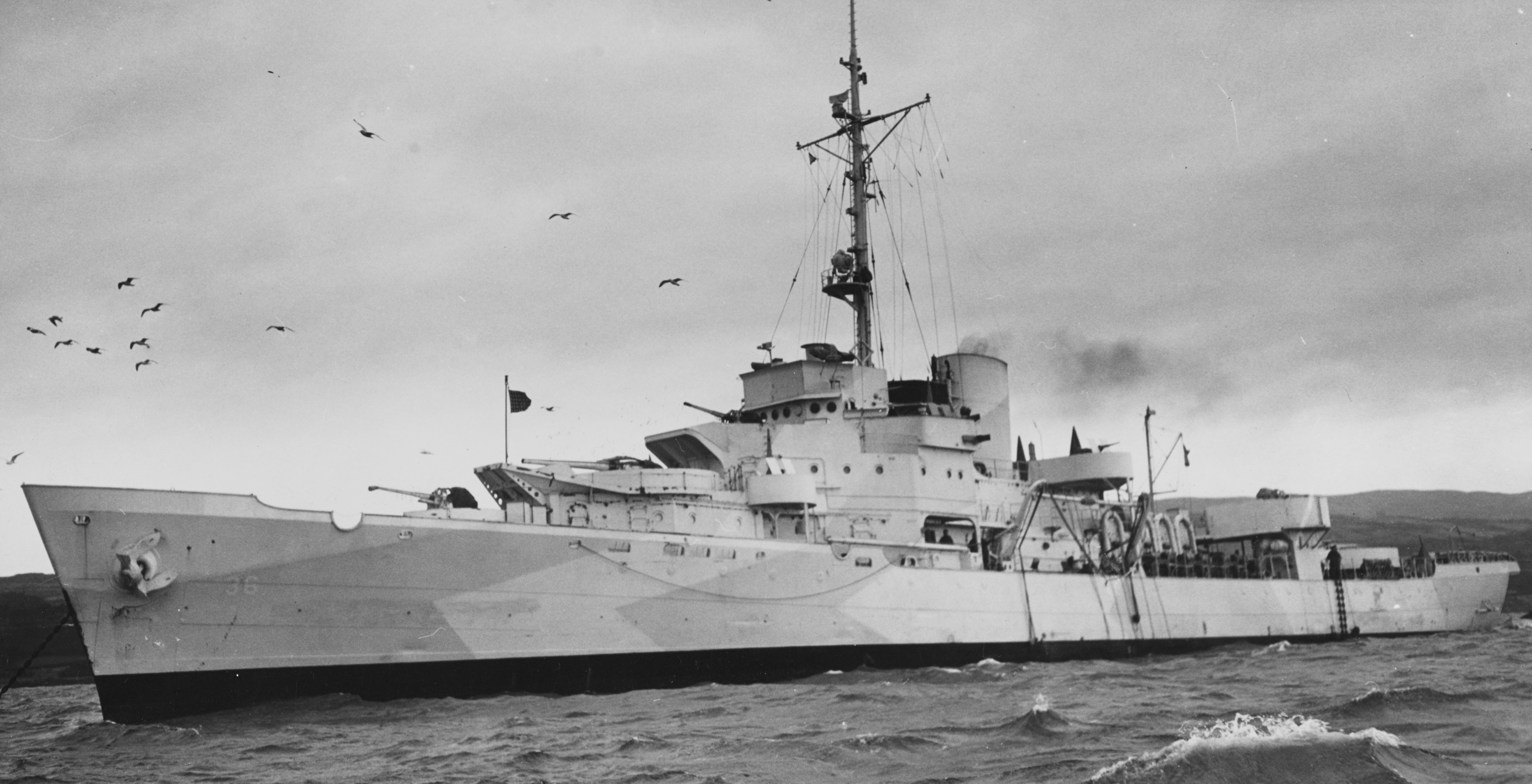
Munro's first shipboard posting was aboard the Coast Guard cutter USCGC Spencer.

Munro and Evans underwent recruit training at Coast Guard Air Station Port Angeles. They were then assigned to the Treasury-class cutter USCGC Spencer, serving aboard the vessel until 1941. During the course of his military service, Munro received consistently high marks on his performance evaluations and—according to Evans—expressed a desire to become a career Coast Guardsman.

=== Guadalcanal campaign ===
In mid-1941, with tension with Japan on the rise, the U.S. government began emergency mobilization, and transferred the Coast Guard from the Department of the Treasury to the Department of the Navy. Munro and Evans volunteered for reassignment to the attack transport USS Hunter Liggett, which was being outfitted and manned by the Coast Guard as part of preparations for War Plan Orange.

By mid-1942, Hunter Liggett had been assigned to Transport Division 17, tasked with supporting the Guadalcanal campaign. In preparation for the planned amphibious operations, Navy personnel began training as small boat handlers under Coast Guard tutelage; owing to the shortage of coxswains, Munro and Evans volunteered to join the training. Prior to the initial landings at the Battle of Tulagi and Gavutu–Tanambogo, Munro was posted to Rear Admiral Richmond Kelly Turner's staff aboard USS McCawley. Cross-trained as both a coxswain and a signalman, he was ordered to ferry troops to shore during the third attack wave, then beach his boat and attach himself to a U.S. Marine unit to help manage ship-to-shore communication.

Following the Allied victory at Tulagi and Gavutu–Tanambogo, Munro and Evans were among Coast Guard and Navy personnel who staffed Naval Operating Base (NOB) Cactus at Lunga Point on the northern coast of Guadalcanal. NOB Cactus served as a communication hub between land forces and offshore vessels. Established on August 9 by Coast Guard Commander Dwight Dexter, NOB Cactus is the only known instance of a naval operating base primarily led by Coast Guard personnel. Munro volunteered for assignment at Lunga Point; Dexter was his favorite officer.

According to U.S. Marine Master Sergeant James Hurlbut, Munro and Evans lived at the base in an approximately 80-square-foot (7.4 m^{2}) hut "they had made from packing boxes and scrap material", which he also described as "quite a swank establishment for Guadalcanal".

On September 20, 1942, Munro volunteered to lead a small boat search-and-rescue mission seeking to recover the crew of a Navy airplane that had been forced down off Savo Island. During the operation, Munro's craft came under intense fire from Japanese shore positions, though he was able to maneuver the boat back to base with only minor injuries to his crew. The downed aircrew was ultimately found and rescued by a flying boat.

On September 27, Lt. Colonel Chesty Puller ordered three companies of Marines to attack the flank of Japanese positions on the west side of the Matanikau River. Munro was placed in charge of two landing craft tank (LCT) and eight Higgins boats tasked with transporting the Marines to their landing points. Preceded by a beach-clearing ship-to-shore bombardment from the destroyer USS Monssen, the amphibious force landed and began moving inland towards its objective. Meanwhile, Munro withdrew his boats to Lunga Point as ordered, carrying with him injured sailors and Marines, among them Navy coxswain Samuel B. Roberts, who had been mortally wounded while using his landing craft to draw Japanese fire away from the Marines.

The U.S. Marine Corps landing force came under attack in a Japanese counteroffensive and quickly found itself encircled on a hill. With the Marines in danger of being overrun, Monssen opened fire on the Japanese positions with her 5-inch (127 mm) caliber guns, managing to clear a narrow corridor to the beach. Using Monssen's signal lamp, Puller ordered the Marines to fight their way to the shore.

At Lunga Point, the landing craft were instructed to return and extract the besieged Marines. Commander Dexter asked Munro and Evans if they would take charge of the mission, to which Munro answered, "Hell yes!" As the boats under Munro's charge approached the recovery points, they came under heavy fire from the Japanese at a ridge abandoned by the Marines. Munro used a .30 caliber machine gun aboard his landing craft to direct suppressing fire against the enemy positions as the other boats recovered the Marines. With Japanese troops moving against the beach, Munro piloted his boat closer to shore to act as a shield. Though the initial extraction was successful, one of the LCTs became grounded on a sandbar. Munro directed the other LCT to help extricate the grounded vessel as he maneuvered his own boat to shield the Marines from Japanese fire from the shore. Munro was shot in the base of his skull and lost consciousness.

The LCT was ultimately freed and the boats resumed their withdrawal. When out of range of Japanese forces, Munro briefly regained consciousness before succumbing to his wounds. According to Evans, his dying words were, "Did they get off?" Evans said later that "... seeing my affirmative nod, he smiled with that smile I knew and liked so well, and then he was gone".

== Burial and decoration ==
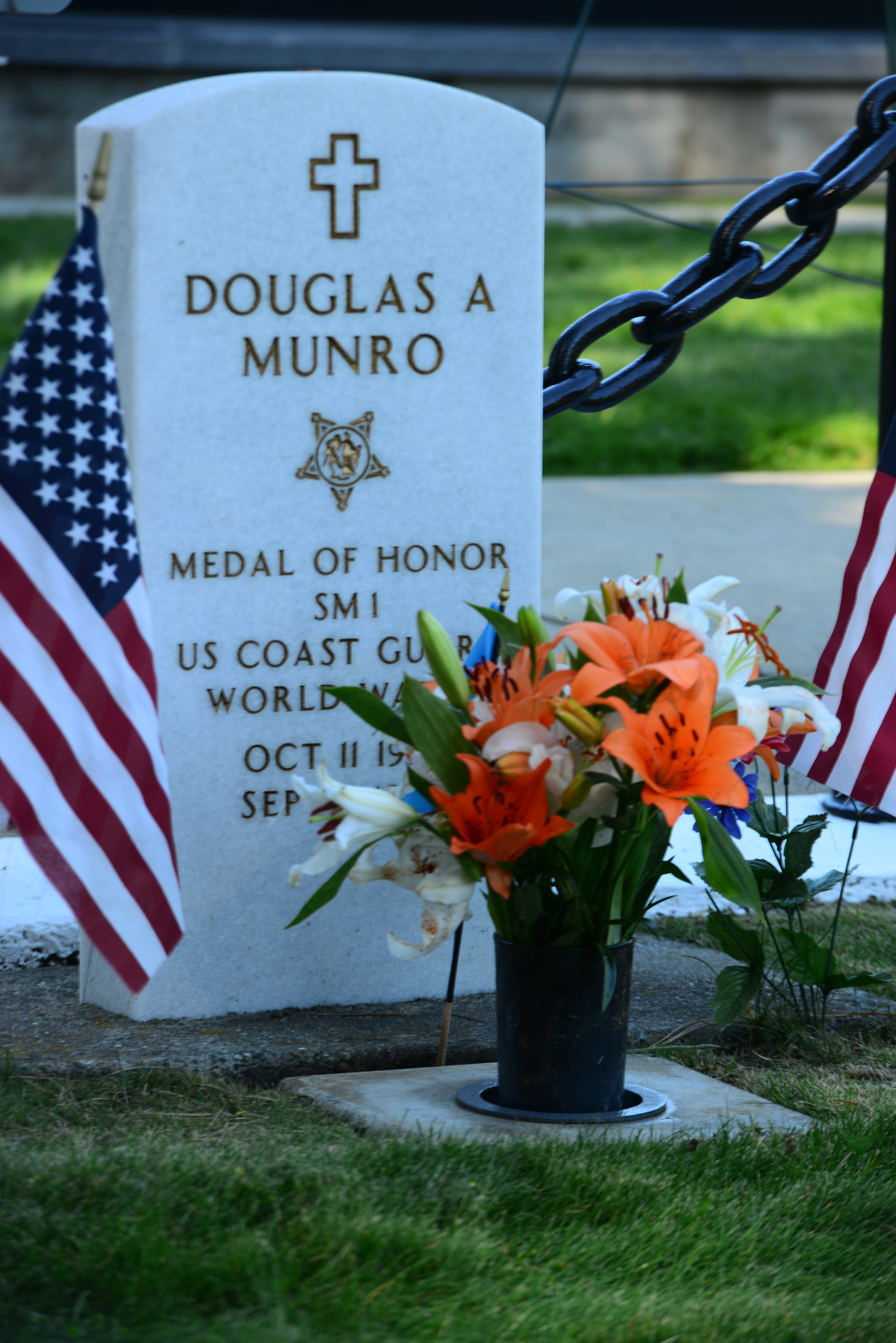
Munro's grave in Cle Elum, Washington, pictured in 2017

Munro was buried on September 28, 1942, the day after his death, on Guadalcanal. In a letter to James Munro, Hurlbut described Munro's grave as being marked by a wooden cross constructed by Evans.

According to Munro's biographer, Williams, the public details of Munro's actions were first chronicled in The Seattle Times on October 15, 1942, though initial reports did not reveal Munro had been killed in action. Four days later, Coast Guard officers arrived at the home of Munro's parents in South Cle Elum to inform them of his death. A memorial service was held on November 1 at the Holy Nativity Episcopal Church in South Cle Elum. The Washington State Guard and American Legion volunteers provided sentries and a cordon of honor outside the church.

Colonel Puller, the Marine officer who had ordered the attack in which Munro perished, nominated the Coast Guardsman for the Medal of Honor, the highest U.S. personal military decoration. The nomination was endorsed by Admiral William Halsey Jr., and President Franklin Roosevelt approved the decoration on or about May 1, 1943. The medal was presented to Munro's parents on May 24 by Roosevelt in a White House ceremony. The citation reads:

For extraordinary heroism and conspicuous gallantry in action above and beyond the call of duty as Officer-in-Charge of a group of Higgins boats, engaged in the evacuation of a Battalion of Marines trapped by enemy Japanese forces at Point Cruz, Guadalcanal, on September 27, 1942. After making preliminary plans for the evacuation of nearly 500 beleaguered Marines, Munro, under constant risk of his life, daringly led five of his small craft toward the shore. As he closed the beach, he signaled the others to land, and then in order to draw the enemy's fire and protect the heavily loaded boats, he valiantly placed his craft with its two small guns as a shield between the beachhead and the Japanese. When the perilous task of evacuation was nearly completed, Munro was killed by enemy fire, but his crew, two of whom were wounded, carried on until the last boat had loaded and cleared the beach. By his outstanding leadership, expert planning, and dauntless devotion to duty, he and his courageous comrades undoubtedly saved the lives of many who otherwise would have perished. He gallantly gave up his life in defense of his country.

To date, Munro is the only member of the U.S. Coast Guard to have received the Medal of Honor.

Munro's remains were recovered from Guadalcanal in 1947 and were reinterred at Laurel Hill Memorial Park in Cle Elum in 1948, his family having declined a full military burial at the Arlington National Cemetery. In 1954, the City of Cle Elum expanded Munro's gravesite with the installation of two decommissioned Mk22 naval deck guns to either side of the tombstone. Munro's parents were later buried on either side of their son's grave at Laurel Hill. The entire site has since been added to the Washington Heritage Register as the Douglas Munro Burial Site.

== Personal life ==
Munro had a sister, Patricia, who attempted to enlist in the Coast Guard Women's Reserve following her brother's death but was rejected as she was underweight. Patricia's son, Douglas Sheehan, was named after her brother and joined the Coast Guard Reserve, retiring at the rank of commander.

At the time of Munro's death, according to a shipmate, he had a girlfriend. Munro also had a maternal cousin serving in the Royal Canadian Navy who was among those killed in the sinking of HMCS Guysborough when she was torpedoed by U-868 in 1945.

== Legacy ==
=== Monuments and memorials ===
The "Douglas Munro March" performed by the U.S. Coast Guard Band in a 1990 recording

Three United States warships have been named after Munro: the destroyer escort USS Douglas A. Munro (DE-422), and the cutters USCGC Douglas Munro (WHEC-724) and USCGC Munro (WMSL-755). As of 2018, USCGC Munro (WMSL-755) is in active Coast Guard service. She was commissioned in 2017 with Julie Sheehan—Munro's great-niece—serving as the ship's sponsor.

Three Coast Guard facilities are named in honor of Munro: Munro Hall at the United States Coast Guard Academy, Munro Hall at United States Coast Guard Training Center Cape May, and the Douglas A. Munro Coast Guard Headquarters Building in Washington, D.C. The Munro headquarters building was named by an act of Congress and opened in 2013. The act to designate the Coast Guard headquarters in tribute to Munro was introduced by Eleanor Holmes Norton, the Delegate of the District of Columbia to the United States, and co-sponsored by United States Congressmen Duncan Hunter, John Garamendi, and Lou Barletta.

Several monuments have also been erected to Munro, including a bronze statue at Coast Guard Training Center Cape May (Douglas Munro by Carey Boone Nelson), a larger-than-life bust at the Douglas A. Munro Coast Guard Headquarters (Douglas Munro by John Tuomisto-Bell and Tyson Snow), a black marble pillar etched with Munro's visage at the Coast Guard Academy, a memorial marker at the Point Cruz Yacht Club in Honiara in the Solomon Islands, and a monument in Crystal River, Florida. In 2006, Munro was added to the Wall of Heroes of the National Museum of the Marine Corps, becoming the only non-Marine represented on it.

In Cle Elum, Washington, Munro is commemorated by Douglas Munro Boulevard.

=== Observances ===
At Coast Guard Training Center Cape May, recruit classes are annually assembled at the statue Douglas Munro on the anniversary of Munro's death, during which three-volleys are fired.

July 24, 2009, was declared Douglas Munro Memorial Day in the State of Washington by Governor Christine Gregoire.

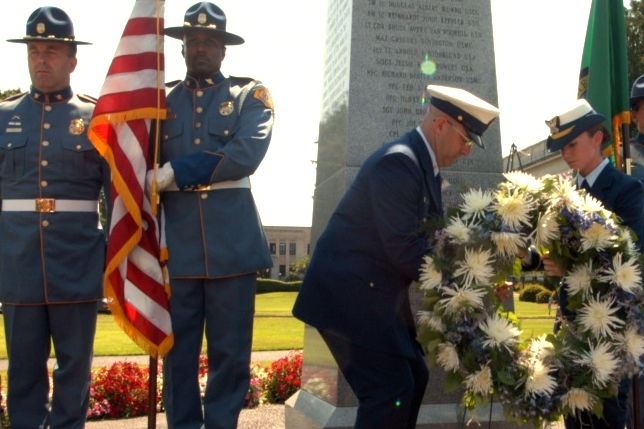
Coast Guard officers, attended by a guard of honor of the Washington State Patrol, lay a wreath at the Medal of Honor memorial in Olympia, Washington on Douglas Munro Memorial Day in 2009.

Video of scenes from the annual observances memorializing the death of Douglas Munro on September 27, 2016, in Cle Elum, Washington

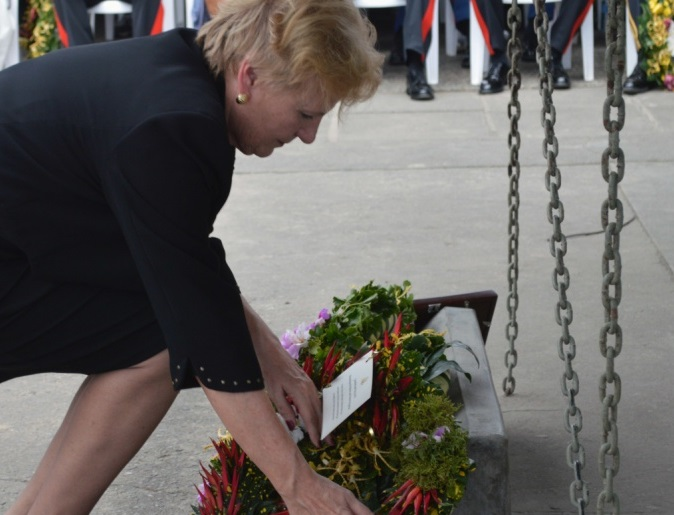
Catherine Ebert-Gray, United States Ambassador to the Solomon Islands, is pictured laying a wreath at the Munro memorial at the Point Cruz Yacht Club in 2017.

==== Cooley flagpole at the Douglas Munro Burial Site ====
For several decades, Munro's boyhood friend Mike Cooley raised and lowered the United States flag at Munro's gravesite, daily walking three miles from his home to the cemetery. According to Cooley's daughter, for over 30 years he never missed a day, even when he was ill with pneumonia. Upon his death in 1999, a lighted flagpole dedicated to Cooley was installed to allow the U.S. colors to be displayed continuously at Munro's grave without the need to be lowered at dusk. (Note: The United States Flag Code permits a flag to be flown after sunset "if properly illuminated during the hours of darkness".) Cooley was cremated and his ashes interred at the Douglas Munro Burial Site with the remains of the Munro family.

Since the dedication of the new flagpole, an annual military ceremony has been held at the gravesite on the anniversary of Munro's death. The 75th anniversary ceremony, held in 2017, was attended by Commandant of the Coast Guard Admiral Paul Zukunft.

=== Other ===
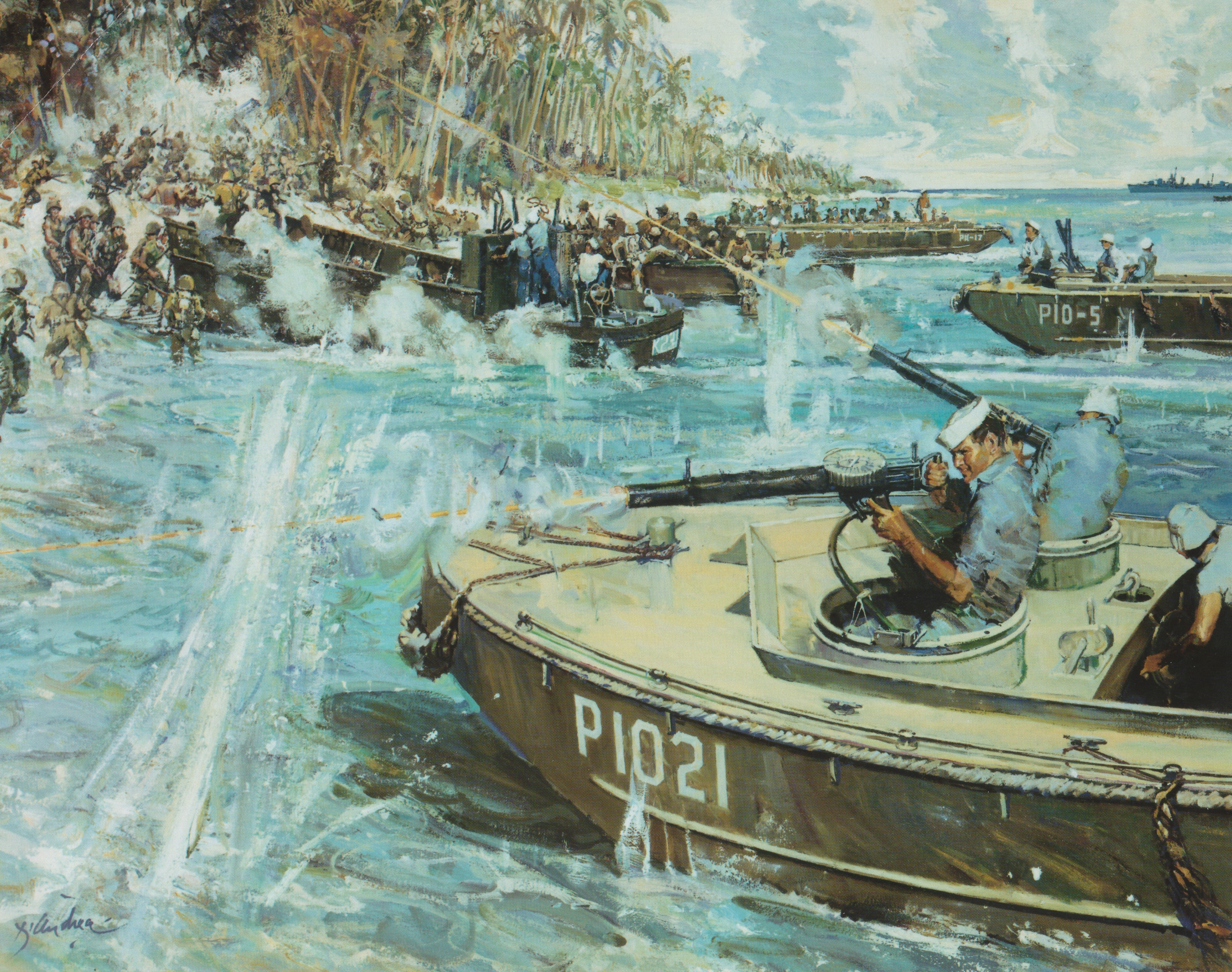
Douglas A. Munro Covers the Withdrawal of the 7th Marines at Guadalcanal, (1989) by Bernard D'Andrea

In 1989 the Coast Guard commissioned the painting Douglas A. Munro Covers the Withdrawal of the 7th Marines at Guadalcanal from Bernard D'Andrea.

The Veterans of Foreign Wars post in Cle Elum is named the Douglas Munro-Robert H. Brooks VFW Post 1373, and the Anacostia chapter of the Surface Navy Association is officially named the Douglas Munro Chapter. The Douglas A. Munro Award, established in 1971 and sponsored by the Navy League of the United States, is annually presented to an enlisted Coast Guardsman "who has demonstrated outstanding leadership and professional competence to the extent of their rank and rate". The "Douglas Munro March", composed by Lewis J. Buckley, was debuted by the United States Coast Guard Band on September 26, 1982, at Constitution Hall in Washington, D.C. In 2014, the Coast Guard Foundation established the Douglas Munro Scholarship Fund. University scholarships from the fund are awarded to the children of U.S. Coast Guard personnel.

Several members of Munro's extended family have been named Douglas as a familial tribute to Munro. The former Washington Secretary of State, Ralph Munro, who is not related to Douglas Munro, has said he frequently visits Munro's grave for personal reflection.

== Ratings ==
Seaman 3rd Class	Seaman 2nd Class	Seaman 1st Class	Signalman 3rd Class	Signalman 2nd Class	Signalman 1st Class
E-1	E-2	E-3	E-4	E-5	E-6
September 18, 1939	December 19, 1939	January 26, 1940	September 21, 1940	May 1, 1941	November 1, 1941

== Awards and decorations ==

1st row	Medal of Honor		Purple Heart
2nd row	Navy Presidential Unit Citation with 1 Service star	Combat Action Ribbon	Coast Guard Good Conduct Medal
3rd row	American Defense Service Medal	American Campaign Medal	Asiatic-Pacific Campaign Medal with 1 Campaign star
4th row	European-African-Middle Eastern Campaign Medal	World War II Victory Medal	Coast Guard Rifle Marksmanship Ribbon

== See also ==
- List of Medal of Honor recipients for World War II
