= Edith Munro =

Officer in the US Coast Guard

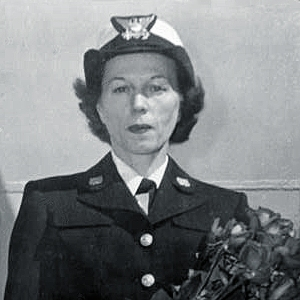
- Edith Munro pictured in United States Coast Guard uniform
- Born: April 16, 1895; Liverpool, England, United Kingdom
- Died: November 17, 1983 (aged 88); United States
- Burial place: Laurel Hill Memorial Park, Cle Elum, Washington, United States
- Spouse: James Munro
- Children: Douglas Albert Munro
- Relatives: Francis Fairey (brother)
- Military career
- Allegiance: United States
- Branch: United States Coast Guard
- Rank: Lieutenant Junior Grade
- Nicknames: "The Hero's Mother", "The Old Lady"
- Commands: Coast Guard Barracks, Seattle
- Awards: Commendation Medal

Edith Thrower Munro (née Fairey; April 16, 1895 – November 17, 1983) was a United States Coast Guard officer and homemaker. She was the mother of the American war hero Douglas Albert Munro and the sister of the Canadian parliamentarian Francis Fairey.

== Early life ==
Munro was born in Liverpool, England; after the death of her father, her mother moved the family to British Columbia, Canada, to be closer to other relatives. Among her brothers was Francis Fairey, who would later command the Irish Fusiliers of Canada and represent Victoria, British Columbia, in the House of Commons of Canada.

She married American expatriate James Munro in Vancouver, British Columbia, in 1914 and later had two children by him, Douglas Albert and Patricia Edith. In 1922, James Munro repatriated his family to the United States, ultimately settling in South Cle Elum, Washington.

== Military career ==
Edith Munro spent her life as a homemaker until the age of 48 when she joined the United States Coast Guard Women's Reserve after her son, who had been serving as a signalman with the United States Coast Guard, was killed in action in the Second Battle of the Matanikau in 1942. She decided by volunteering for military service she would be honoring his legacy. She eventually commanded the Coast Guard barracks in Seattle.

In May 1943, Munro was presented with her son's Medal of Honor by President of the United States Franklin D. Roosevelt in a White House ceremony. She was the sponsor of two of the three United States warships named after her son, the destroyer USS Douglas A. Munro and the cutter USCGC Douglas Munro.

Munro did not want her son's remains to be interred at Arlington National Cemetery because she would be unable to attend to his grave. Instead they were buried at the Laurel Hill Memorial Park in Cle Elum, Washington. Following her own death, Munro was buried to the left of her son with military honors. The Munro graves have since been designated a State of Washington Historical Site and are the location of an annual observance on the anniversary of Douglas Munro's death.

== See also ==
- Dorothy C. Stratton
