= USCGC Munro (WMSL-755) =

Legend-class cutter of the United States Coast Guard

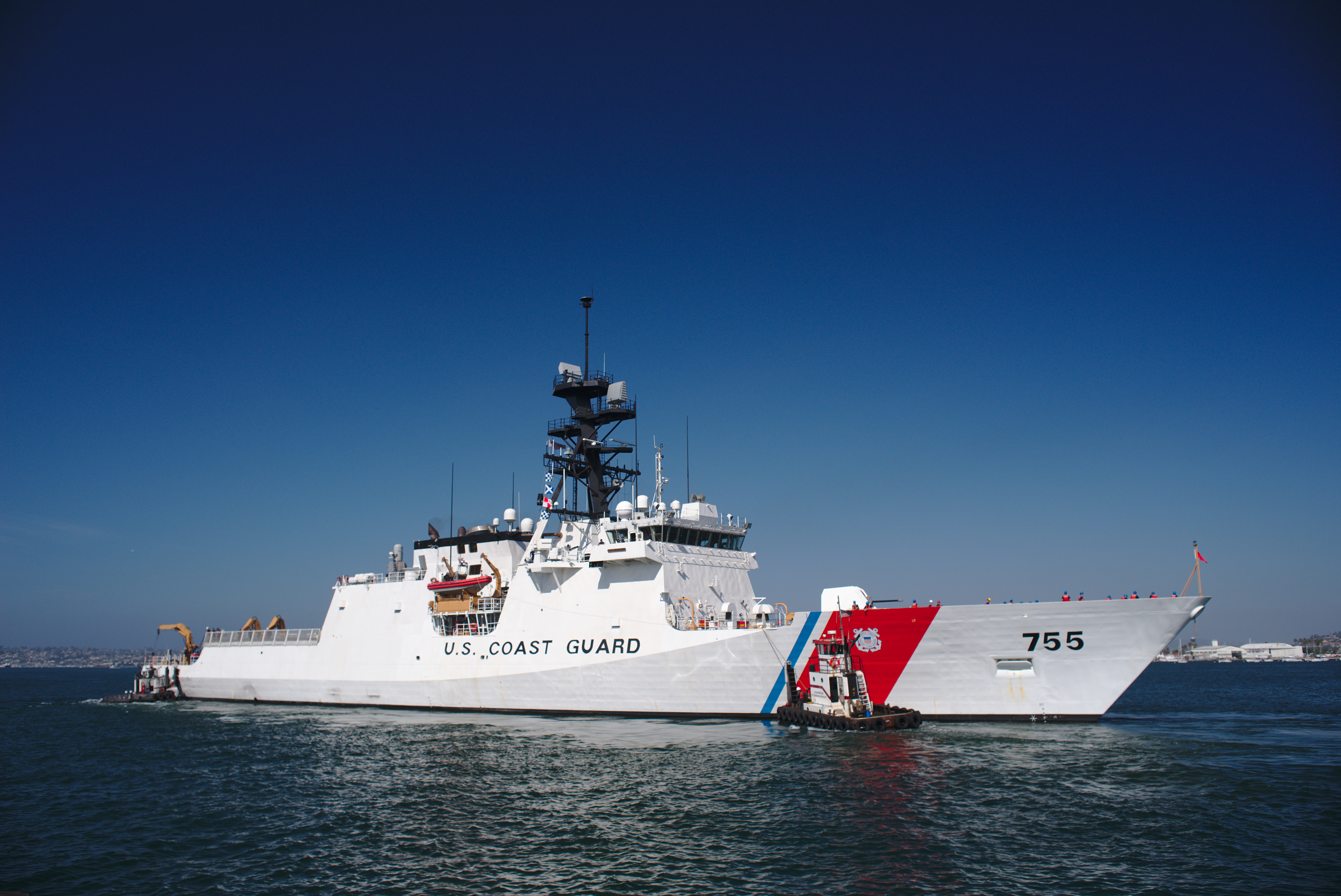

History

United States
- Name: Munro
- Namesake: Douglas A. Munro
- Awarded: April 30, 2013
- Builder: Huntington Ingalls Industries, Pascagoula, Mississippi
- Cost: $487.1 million
- Laid down: November 5, 2014
- Launched: September 12, 2015
- Sponsored by: Julie Sheehan
- Christened: November 14, 2015
- Acquired: December 16, 2016
- Commissioned: April 1, 2017
- Identification: MMSI number: 303866000; Callsign: NMUN
- Motto: "Gallantry in Action"
- Status: In service
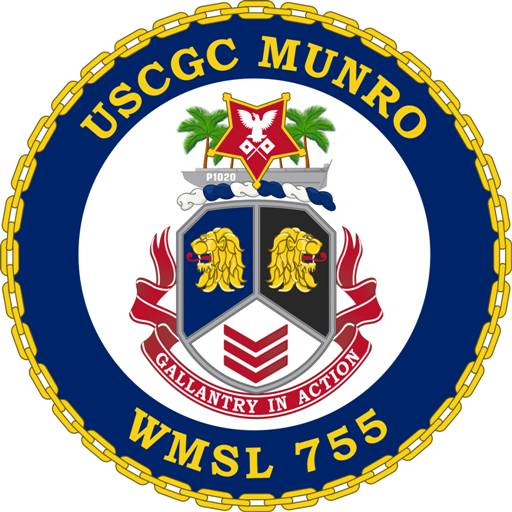
- Badge

General characteristics
- Class & type: Legend-class cutter
- Displacement: 4500 LT
- Length: 418 ft (127 m)
- Beam: 54 ft (16 m)
- Height: 140 ft (43 m)
- Draft: 22.5 ft (6.9 m)
- Decks: 4
- Propulsion: Combined diesel and gas
- Speed: 28+ knots
- Range: 12,000 nm
- Endurance: 60 days
- Complement: 111 (15 officers, 15 CPOs, 81 enlisted) and can carry up to 148 depending on mission
- Sensors & processing systems: EADS 3D TRS-16 AN/SPS-75 Air Search Radar; SPQ-9B Fire Control Radar; AN/SPS-79 Surface Search Radar; AN/SLQ-32
- Electronic warfare & decoys: AN/SLQ-32 Electronic Warfare System; 2 SRBOC/ 2 x NULKA countermeasures chaff/rapid decoy launcher
- Armament: 1 x MK 110 57mm gun a variant of the Bofors 57 mm gun and Gunfire Control System; 1 × 20 mm Block 1B Phalanx Close-In Weapons System; 4 × .50 caliber machine guns; 2 × M240B 7.62 mm machine guns
- Armor: Ballistic protection for main gun
- Aircraft carried: 2 x MH-65C Dolphin MCH, or 4 x VUAV or 1 x MH-65C Dolphin MCH and 2 x VUAV
- Aviation facilities: 50-by-80-foot (15 m × 24 m) flight deck, hangar for all aircraft

USCGC Munro (WMSL-755) is the sixth Legend-class cutter of the United States Coast Guard. Munro is the second cutter named for Signalman First Class Douglas A. Munro (1919–1942), the only coast guardsman to be awarded the Medal of Honor. The US Navy destroyer escort USS Douglas A. Munro (DE-422) was also named for Munro.

== History ==
Huntington Ingalls Industries subsidiary Ingalls Shipyard in Pascagoula, Mississippi, was awarded the $487.1 million construction contract on April 30, 2013. Construction officially began on October 7, 2013 with a ceremony marking the cutting of the first 100 tons of steel. Munro was launched at Pascagoula on September 12, 2015 and christened there on November 14, 2015.

Munro crew intercepting suspected drug smuggling vessel, June 18, 2019

On June 18, 2019, the crew participated in capturing a narco-submarine carrying 17,000 pounds of cocaine in the eastern Pacific Ocean. The total amount of drugs seized was valued at US$232 million, representing one of the largest drug seizures to date. Video of the incident was later made available on both news and military websites. The video shows the Coast Guard ordering the submarine to stop, followed by Coast Guard personnel jumping aboard the still-moving submarine and forcing the hatch open, leading to the surrender of the submarine's crew.

On June 24, 2025 USCGC Munro was deployed for the rescue of Morning Midas, a Liberian-flagged cargo ship managed by UK-based Zodiac Maritime, which caught fire about 300 miles south of Alaska. On January 7, 2026, USCGC Munro captured the Russian tanker Marinera (renamed Bella 1) south of Iceland as part of Operation Southern Spear.

== See also ==
- National Security Cutter
- Navy: USS Douglas A. Munro (DE-422)
- Integrated Deepwater System Program
