= An act to designate the Douglas A. Munro Coast Guard Headquarters Building =

- Long title: To designate the headquarters building of the Coast Guard on the campus located at 2701 Martin Luther King, Jr., Avenue Southeast in the District of Columbia as the Douglas A. Munro Coast Guard Headquarters Building, and for other purposes.
- Enacted by: the 113th United States Congress
- Sponsored by: Eleanor Holmes Norton (D–DC)
- Number of co-sponsors: 0

Citations
- Public law: Pub. L. 113–31 (text) (PDF)

Codification
- Agencies affected: United States Coast Guard

[H.R. 2611 Legislative history]
- Introduced in the House as H.R. 2611 by Eleanor Holmes Norton (D–DC) on July 8, 2013; Committee consideration by United States House Committee on Transportation and Infrastructure; Passed the House on July 16, 2013 (411-0); Passed the Senate on July 30, 2013 (unanimous consent); Signed into law by President Barack Obama on August 9, 2013

H.R. 2611 (long title: To designate the headquarters building of the Coast Guard on the campus located at 2701 Martin Luther King, Jr., Avenue Southeast in the District of Columbia as the "Douglas A. Munro Coast Guard Headquarters Building," and for other purposes) is a law that was passed during the 113th United States Congress. The law names the new United States Coast Guard building after Douglas Albert Munro.

Signalman First Class Douglas Albert Munro is the only member of the United States Coast Guard to have received the Medal of Honor. The Medal of Honor is the highest military honor awarded in the United States given out for personal acts of valor above and beyond the call of duty. Munro received it "after succeeding in his assignment, for which he had volunteered, to evacuate a detachment of Marines that had been overwhelmed by the enemy" during World War II.

== Provisions of the law ==
H.R. 2611 is a fairly simple, straightforward law with only two sections. Section one states that "the headquarters building of the Coast Guard on the campus located at 2701 Martin Luther King, Jr. Avenue Southeast in the District of Columbia shall be known and designated as the 'Douglas A. Munro Coast Guard Headquarters Building'." Section two states that "any reference in a law, map, regulation, document, paper, or other record of the United States to the building referred to in section 1 shall be deemed to be a reference to the 'Douglas A. Munro Coast Guard Headquarters Building'."

== Procedural history ==
H.R. 2611 was introduced into the House by Delegate Eleanor Holmes Norton (D–DC) on July 8, 2013. It was referred to the United States House Committee on Transportation and Infrastructure, which held a consideration and mark-up session on July 10, 2013, before ordering the bill reported by a voice vote. House Majority Leader Eric Cantor placed the bill on the House calendar for the week of July 15, 2013. The bill passed the House on July 16, 2013, by 411-0 in Roll Call 356. The bill passed the Senate on July 30, 2013 by unanimous consent and was signed into law by President Barack Obama on August 9, 2013.

== See also ==
- List of bills in the 113th United States Congress
- United States Coast Guard
- Douglas Albert Munro
