= H.R. 3343 (113th Congress) =

- Long title: To amend the District of Columbia Home Rule Act to clarify the rules regarding the determination of the compensation of the Chief Financial Officer of the District of Columbia.
- Announced in: the 113th United States Congress
- Sponsored by: Del. Eleanor Holmes Norton (D, DC-0)
- Number of co-sponsors: 1

Codification
- Acts affected: District of Columbia Home Rule Act
- U.S.C. sections affected: 5 U.S.C. § 5307

Legislative history
- Introduced in the House as H.R. 3343 by Del. Eleanor Holmes Norton (D, DC-0) on October 28, 2013; Committee consideration by United States House Committee on Oversight and Government Reform; Passed the House on November 18, 2013 (voice vote)

The bill H.R. 3343, long title "To amend the District of Columbia Home Rule Act to clarify the rules regarding the determination of the compensation of the Chief Financial Officer of the District of Columbia," is a bill that would change the amount of legal compensation the chief financial officer of Washington, D.C. could receive each year. Under this bill, the CFO compensation could equal the same compensation received by a senior executive service federal official. The bill was introduced in the United States House of Representatives during the 113th United States Congress. It passed the House on November 18, 2013.

== Background ==
If this bill were to pass, it would establish the new level of compensation that the chief financial officer of the District of Columbia could receive. Congress has the power to establish the salary of such an official due to the unique status of Washington, D.C.. As the federal capital, the constitution grants the United States Congress exclusive jurisdiction over the district in "all cases whatsoever."

At certain times, and presently since 1973, Congress has allowed certain powers of government to be carried out by locally elected officials. This is referred to as "District of Columbia home rule." However, Congress maintains the power to overturn local laws and exercises greater oversight of the city than exists for any U.S. state. Furthermore, the district's elected government exists at the pleasure of Congress and could theoretically be revoked at any time.

Congress created the position of Washington D.C.'s Chief Financial Officer in the 1990s. In the summer of 2013, when Natwar M. Gandhi decided to retire from his position as DC CFO, the DC Council began to discuss increasing the CFO pay. The proposal of increasing the salary range up to $250,000 would have been a 20% pay increase over what the existing CFO was making. The existing salary was a maximum of $199,700 by law. In order for there to be any changes in the CFO salary, it would require an amendment to the city charter, authorized by Congress through formal legislation.

== Provisions of the bill ==
This summary is based largely on the summary provided by the Congressional Research Service, a public domain source.

H.R. 3343 would amend the District of Columbia Home Rule Act with respect to the compensation of the District of Columbia's chief financial officer (CFO).

The bill would prohibit the CFO's total compensation (including allowances, differentials, bonuses, awards, or other similar cash payments) in a calendar year from exceeding the total annual compensation payable to the Vice President of the United States. Under existing law, the CFO is paid at an annual rate equal to the rate of basic pay payable for level I of the Executive Schedule.

== Congressional Budget Office report ==
This summary is based largely on the summary provided by the Congressional Budget Office, as ordered reported by the House Committee on Oversight and Government Reform on October 29, 2013. This is a public domain source.

The Congressional Budget Office (CBO) estimated that enacting H.R. 3343 would have no effect on the federal budget. The legislation would amend the District of Columbia Home Rule Act to increase the maximum pay for the chief financial officer (CFO) of the District of Columbia from $199,700 to the salary of the Vice President of the United States (currently $230,700). The salary of the district's CFO is paid for with local funds raised by the District of Columbia. Enacting the bill would not affect direct spending or revenues; therefore, pay-as-you-go procedures do not apply.

H.R. 3343 contains no intergovernmental or private-sector mandates as defined in the Unfunded Mandates Reform Act and would not affect the budgets of state, local, or tribal governments.

On September 30, 2013, the CBO transmitted a cost estimate for H.R. 2793, the District of Columbia Financial Efficiency Act of 2013, as ordered reported by the House Committee on Oversight and Government Reform on July 24, 2013. H.R. 2793 contains a provision similar to H.R. 3343, and the estimated costs of those provisions are the same.

== Procedural history ==
H.R. 3343 was introduced in the United States House of Representatives by Del. Eleanor Holmes Norton (D, DC-0) on October 28, 2013. It was referred to the United States House Committee on Oversight and Government Reform, which considered and markedup the bill on October 29, 2013. It was ordered reported by voice vote. The committee reported it alongside House Report 113-267 on November 15, 2013. On November 15, 2013, House Majority Leader Eric Cantor announced that the bill would be considered under a suspension of the rules on November 18, 2013. The bill passed the House with a voice vote on November 18, 2013.

== Debate ==
Supporters of the salary increase argued that it was necessary to keep the CFO salary offered by the district comparable to the compensation offered by other similar cities. They also argued that managing DC requires unique skills because DC functions as both a "city and a state."

== See also ==
- List of bills in the 113th United States Congress
- District of Columbia home rule
- District of Columbia Home Rule Act
