= USCGC Raymond Evans =

USCGC Raymond Evans (WPC-1110)
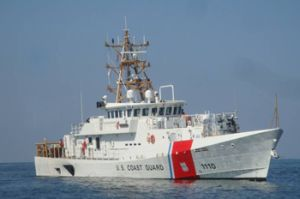
- Raymond Evans, during her sea trials

History

United States
- Namesake: Raymond Evans (USCG)
- Builder: Bollinger Shipyards, Lockport, Louisiana
- Launched: June 25, 2014
- Acquired: June 25, 2014
- Commissioned: September 6, 2014
- Identification: MMSI number: 338926410; Callsign: NRAE; Hull number: WPC-1110
- Motto: We have a job to do
- Status: in active service
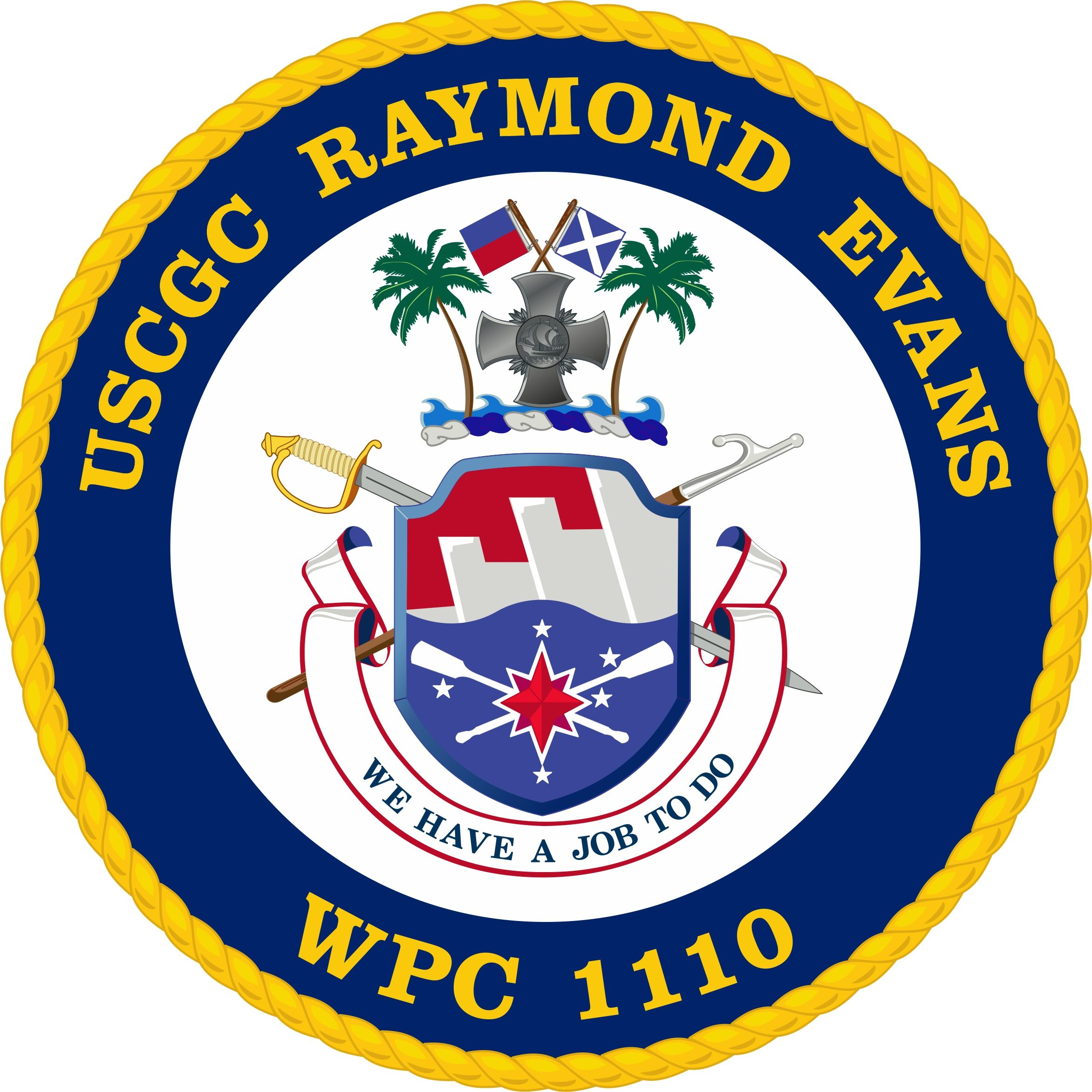
- Badge

General characteristics
- Class & type: Sentinel-class cutter
- Displacement: 353 long tons (359 t)
- Length: 46.8 m (154 ft)
- Beam: 8.11 m (26.6 ft)
- Depth: 2.9 m (9.5 ft)
- Propulsion: 2 × 4,300 kW (5,800 shp); 1 × 75 kW (101 shp) bow thruster
- Speed: 28 knots (52 km/h; 32 mph)
- Endurance: 5 days, 2,500 nmi (4,600 km; 2,900 mi); Designed to be on patrol 2,500 hours per year
- Boats & landing craft carried: 1 × Short Range Prosecutor RHIB
- Complement: 4 officers, 20 crew
- Sensors & processing systems: L-3 C4ISR suite
- Armament: 1 × Mk 38 Mod 2 25 mm automatic gun; 4 × Browning M2 .50 cal machine guns; Various small arms

USCGC Raymond Evans is the tenth vessel in the United States Coast Guard's Sentinel-class cutter. All the vessels are named after members of the Coast Guard, or its precursor services, who are remembered for their heroism. Names had already been assigned for the first fourteen vessels, when Commander Raymond Evans died, and the USCG Commandant announced that the next Sentinel class cutter would be named after him. Joseph Napier, who was originally scheduled to be the namesake of the tenth vessel, had his name moved to the beginning of the second list of heroes names, and will now be the namesake of the fifteenth vessel.

The vessel was delivered to the Coast Guard, for pre-commissioning trials, on June 25, 2014. On August 20, 2014, an open house was held to allow residents of Key West, Florida to tour the vessel. The vessel was commissioned on September 6, 2014.

== Design ==
The Sentinel-class cutters were designed to replace the shorter 110-foot (34 m) Island-class patrol boats. Raymond Evans is equipped with a remote-control 25 mm Bushmaster autocannon and four, crew-served M2HB .50-caliber machine guns. It has a bow thruster for maneuvering in crowded anchorages and channels. It also has small underwater fins for coping with the rolling and pitching caused by large waves. It is equipped with a stern launching ramp, like the Marine Protector-class and the eight failed extended-hull Island-class cutters. It has a complement of twenty-two crew members. Like the Marine Protector class, and the cancelled extended-hull Island-class cutters, the Sentinel-class cutters deploy the Short Range Prosecutor Rigid-hulled inflatable (SRP or RHIB) in rescues and interceptions.

According to Marine Log, modifications to the Coast Guard vessels from the Stan 4708 design include an increase in speed from 23 to 28 knots (43 to 52 km/h; 26 to 32 mph), fixed-pitch rather than variable-pitch propellers, stern launch capability, and watertight bulkheads.

Raymond Evans has an overall length of 153 feet 6 inches (46.79 m), a beam of 25 feet (7.6 m), and a displacement of 325 long tons (330 t; 364 short tons). Its draft is 9 feet 6 inches (2.90 m) and it has a maximum speed of over 28 knots (52 km/h; 32 mph). The Sentinel-class cutters have an endurance of five days and a range of 2,950 nautical miles (3,390 mi; 5,460 km).

== Career ==
In early January, while operating off the coast of Guyana with USCGC Stone (WMSL-758), Raymond Evans boarded a suspected narcotics trafficking vessel. After testing the packages found on board, 970 kilograms of cocaine were recovered and the suspected traffickers were detained.
