= Francis Fairey =

Canadian politician

Member of Parliament for Victoria
- In office November 12, 1953 – April 12, 1957
- Preceded by: Robert Mayhew
- Succeeded by: Albert McPhillips

Personal details
- Born: November 8, 1887 Liverpool, England
- Died: November 4, 1971 (aged 83)
- Party: Liberal
- Relations: Edith Munro (sister); Douglas Munro (nephew)
- Profession: teacher

Francis Thrower Fairey (November 11, 1887 – November 4, 1971) was a Canadian politician, who served as a Liberal member of the House of Commons of Canada from 1953 to 1957. He was a teacher by career.

He was first elected at the Victoria riding in the 1953 general election, but was defeated by Albert McPhillips of the Progressive Conservatives in the 1957 election.

Prior to entering politics, he served as a teacher in Vancouver, British Columbia, Deputy Minister of Education, provincial Director of Industrial and Technical Education and also the Regional Director of the Canadian Vocational Training Program. The vocational training facility at Victoria High School, Fairey Technical Unit ("Fairey Tech"), was named after him.

Fairey was the brother of Edith Munro and the uncle of Douglas Albert Munro.
