= USCGC Stone =

Legend-class cutters of the United States Coast Guard

USCGC Stone (WMSL-758)
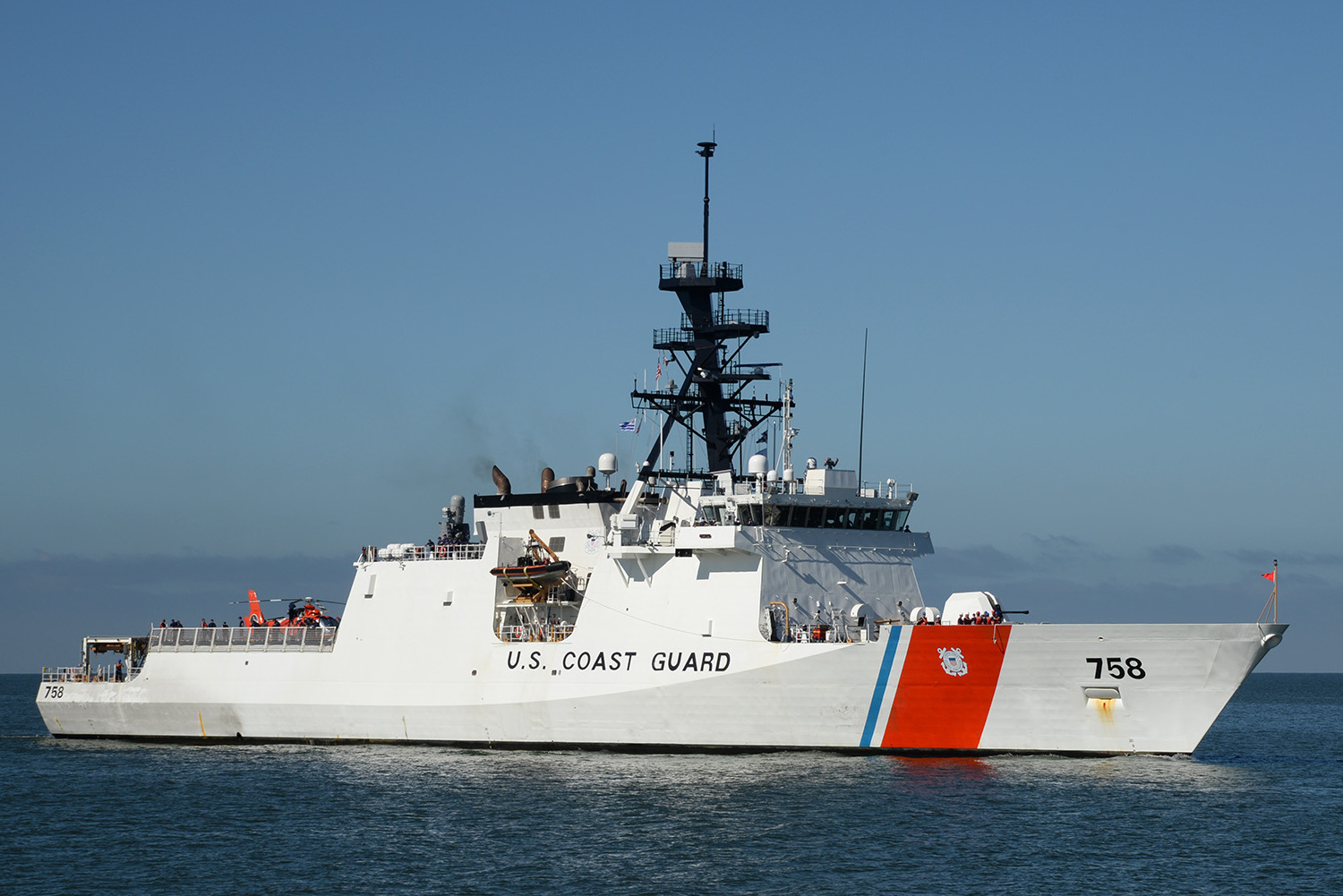

History

United States
- Name: Stone
- Namesake: Elmer Fowler Stone
- Awarded: 31 March 2015
- Builder: Huntington Ingalls Industries, Pascagoula, Mississippi
- Cost: $499.76 Million
- Laid down: 14 September 2018
- Launched: 4 October 2019
- Christened: 29 February 2020
- Acquired: 10 November 2020
- Commissioned: 19 March 2021
- Home port: Charleston
- Identification: Pennant number: WMSL-758
- Motto: "Energy Efficiency Courage"
- Status: Active
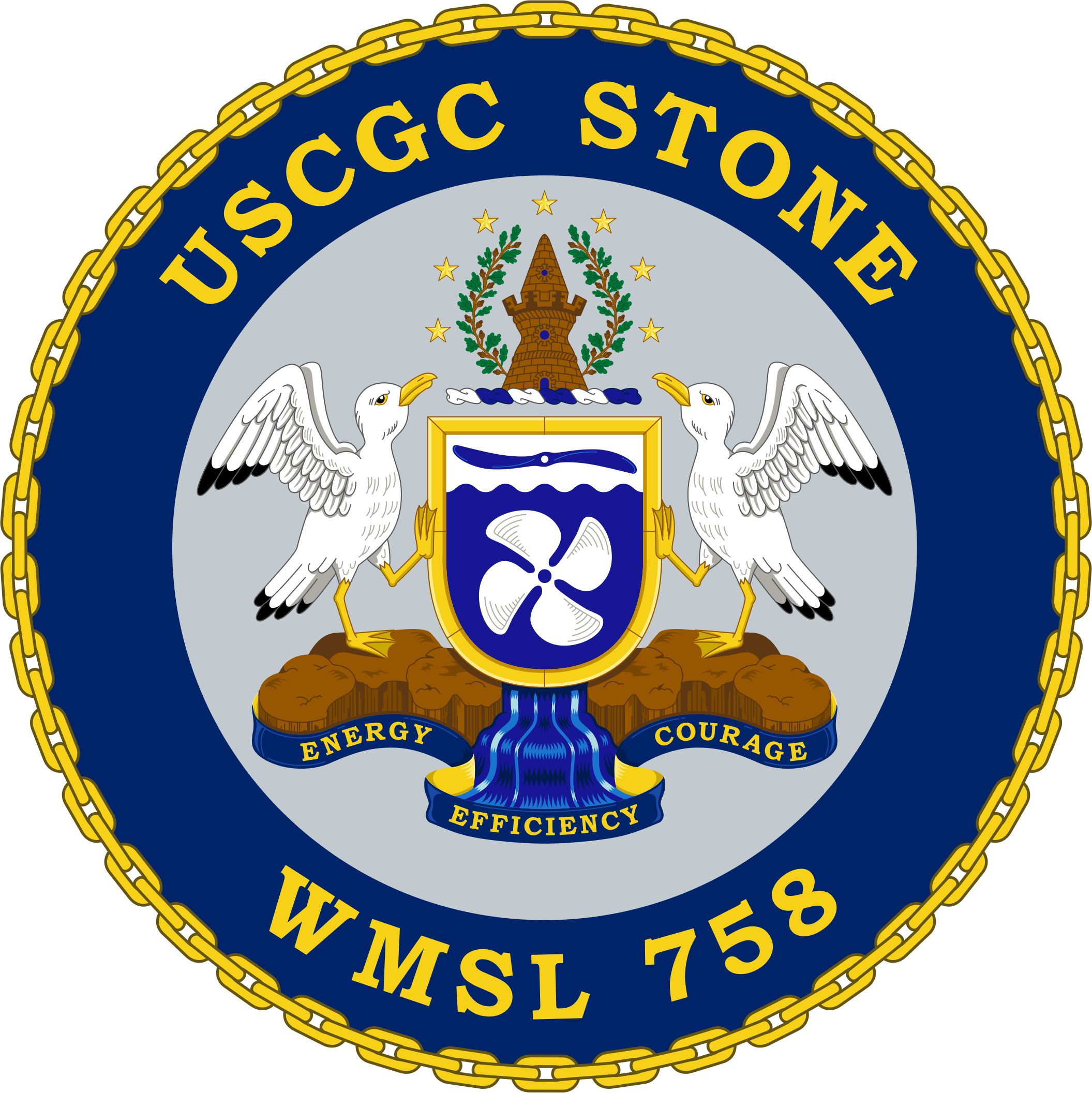
- Badge

General characteristics
- Class & type: Legend-class cutter
- Displacement: 4,500 long tons (4,600 t)
- Length: 418 ft (127 m)
- Beam: 54 ft (16 m)
- Draft: 22.5 ft (6.9 m)
- Propulsion: Combined diesel and gas
- Speed: 28 knots (52 km/h; 32 mph)
- Range: 12,000 nmi (22,000 km; 14,000 mi)
- Endurance: 60 to 90-day patrol cycles
- Complement: 120
- Sensors & processing systems: AN/SPS-75 air search radar; SPQ-9B fire control radar; AN/SPS-79 surface search radar
- Electronic warfare & decoys: AN/SLQ-32 electronic warfare system; 2 x Mk 36 SRBOC/ 2 x Mk-53 NULKA countermeasures chaff/rapid decoy launcher
- Armament: 1 x Mk 110 57 mm (2.2 in) Naval Gun System (variant of the Bofors 57 mm gun); 1 × 20 mm Block 1B Phalanx Close-In Weapons System; 4 × .50 caliber (12.7 mm) M2 Browning machine guns; 2 × M240B 7.62 mm machine guns
- Armor: Ballistic protection for main gun
- Aircraft carried: 2 x MH-65C Dolphin MCH, or 1 x MH-65C Dolphin MCH and 2 x sUAS

USCGC Stone (WMSL-758) is the ninth Legend-class cutter of the United States Coast Guard and is stationed in Charleston, South Carolina.

== Development and design ==
All of Legend-class cutters were constructed by Huntington Ingalls Industries and were part of the Integrated Deepwater System Program. They are of the high endurance cutter roles with additional upgrades to make it more of an asset to the Department of Defense during declared national emergency contingencies. The cutters are armed mainly to take on lightly armed hostiles in Low-Threat Environments.

== Construction and career ==
Stone was laid down on 14 September 2018, launched on 4 October 2019 by Huntington Ingalls Industries and christened on 29 February 2020. She will be expected to be commissioned in February 2021. Her sea trials took place on 15 September in the Gulf of Mexico and was successfully delivered to the Coast Guard on 10 November 2020.

On 22 December 2020, she left Pascagoula, Mississippi for her first patrol, which was also her shakedown cruise, in the South Atlantic. While in the South Atlantic, she participated Operation Southern Cross which is designed to counter illegal, unregulated, and unreported fishing along with strengthening partnerships throughout the region. On January 29, 2021, it was announced that the Stone would not make her scheduled stop in Argentina after visiting Guyana, Brazil, and Uruguay. The crew did not disembark in Montevideo, due to concerns about the COVID-19 pandemic. Before returning home, while off the coast of Guyana she helped to interdict a suspected narcotic trafficker with USCGC Raymond Evans (WPC-1110). Evans took possession of the contraband and the traffickers. The recovered cocaine was estimated to be in excess of 970 kilograms. After recovering the drugs, she continued on her shakedown cruise covered 18,250 nautical miles (33,800 km) over the course of 68 days before returning home.

Stone was commissioned on 19 March 2021, in her homeport of North Charleston, S.C.

== See also ==
- Integrated Deepwater System Program
