= Cle Elum-Roslyn High School =

Public high school in Washington, United States

Coordinates: 47°12′16″N 120°58′29″W

Location
- 2692 State Road 903; Cle Elum, (Kittitas County), Washington 98922; United States

Information
- Type: Public high school
- Principal: Sarah Houseberg
- Staff: 15.81 (FTE)
- Enrollment: 283 (2023-2024)
- Student to teacher ratio: 17.90
- Colors: Maroon and gold
- Nickname: Warriors

Cle Elum-Roslyn High School is a public high school located in Cle Elum, Washington. It serves 280 students in grades 9–12. 88% of the students are white, while 4% are Hispanic, 3% are Asian, 2% are American Indian and 2% are two or more races.

== Notable people ==
Douglas A. Munro, USCG, Medal of Honor recipient
