= HMS Guysborough =

Minesweeper of the Royal Navy

Coordinates: 46°43′N 9°30′W

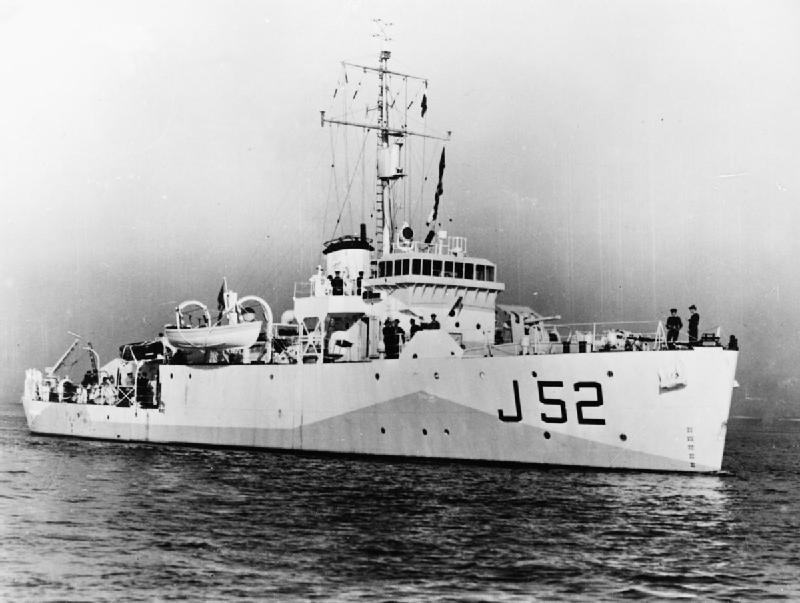
- Guysborough underway in coastal waters

History

United Kingdom
- Name: Guysborough
- Ordered: 28 November 1940
- Builder: North Van Ship Repair, North Vancouver
- Laid down: 28 May 1941
- Launched: 21 July 1941
- Fate: Loaned to Royal Canadian Navy 1942

Canada
- Name: Guysborough
- Namesake: Guysborough, Nova Scotia
- Commissioned: 22 April 1942
- Out of service: 17 March 1945
- Honours and awards: Atlantic 1943–44, Normandy 1944
- Fate: Sunk 17 March 1945

General characteristics
- Class & type: Bangor-class minesweeper
- Displacement: 672 long tons (683 t)
- Length: 180 ft (54.9 m) oa
- Beam: 28 ft 6 in (8.7 m)
- Draught: 9 ft 9 in (3.0 m)
- Propulsion: 2 Admiralty 3-drum water tube boilers, 2 shafts, vertical triple-expansion reciprocating engines, 2,400 ihp (1,790 kW)
- Speed: 16.5 knots (31 km/h)
- Complement: 83
- Armament: 1 × 12-pounder (3 in (76 mm)) 12 cwt HA gun; 2 × QF 20 mm Oerlikon guns; 40 depth charges as escort

HMS Guysborough was a VTE-engined Bangor-class minesweeper of the Royal Navy. Before commissioning she was transferred to the Royal Canadian Navy on loan. She saw action in the Battle of the Atlantic and the Invasion of Normandy. She was torpedoed by the German submarine U-868 in 1945 while returning to the United Kingdom.

== Design and description ==
A British design, the Bangor-class minesweepers were smaller than the preceding Halcyon-class minesweepers in British service, but larger than the Fundy class in Canadian service. They came in two versions powered by different engines; those with a diesel engines and those with vertical triple-expansion steam engines. Guysborough was of the latter design and was larger than her diesel-engined cousins. Guysborough was 180 feet (54.9 m) long overall, had a beam of 28 feet 6 inches (8.7 m) and a draught of 9 feet 9 inches (3.0 m). The minesweeper had a displacement of 672 long tons (683 t). She had a complement of 6 officers and 77 enlisted.

Guysborough had two vertical triple-expansion steam engines, each driving one shaft, using steam provided by two Admiralty three-drum boilers. The engines produced a total of 2,400 indicated horsepower (1,800 kW) and gave a maximum speed of 16.5 knots (30.6 km/h; 19.0 mph). The minesweeper could carry a maximum of 150 long tons (152 t) of fuel oil.

British Bangor-class minesweepers were armed with a single 12-pounder (3 in (76 mm)) 12 cwt HA gun mounted forward. (Note: "Cwt" is the abbreviation for hundredweight, 20 cwt referring to the weight of the gun.) For anti-aircraft purposes, the minesweepers were equipped with one QF 2-pounder Mark VIII and two single-mounted QF 20 mm Oerlikon guns. The 2-pounder gun was later replaced with a twin 20 mm Oerlikon mount. As a convoy escort, Guysborough was deployed with 40 depth charges launched from two depth charge throwers and four chutes.

== Service history ==
Guysborough was ordered on 28 November 1940. The minesweeper's keel was laid down on 28 May 1941 by North Van Ship Repairs Ltd. at North Vancouver and the ship was launched on 21 July later that year. Guysborough was loaned to the Royal Canadian Navy and commissioned on 22 April 1942.

After commissioning, Guysborough was assigned to Esquimalt Force. She remained with the unit until March 1943 when she transferred to the east coast, arriving at the end of April. She saw brief service with the Western Local Escort Force before joining the Halifax Local Defence Force.

In mid-September 1943, Guysborough sailed to Baltimore where she underwent a refit that took six weeks to complete. In February 1944, she was sent to the United Kingdom as part of Canada's contribution to the invasion of Normandy. Upon arrival she was assigned to the British 14th Minesweeping Flotilla and swept Channel 2 in the American sector of the invasion route of mines during the night of 5–6 June. The 14th Minesweeping Flotilla resumed minesweeping activities an hour after the assault began on 6 June. They swept Baie de la Seine until 13 June. The 14th flotilla continued minesweeping activities in the invasion area until 21 June. She remained in UK waters until December when she returned to Canada to undergo another refit, this time at Lunenburg.

In March, following completion of the refit, Guysborough was ordered back to the United Kingdom. While en route, she was torpedoed.

=== Sinking ===
At 18:50 on 17 March 1945 Guysborough was hit by a G7es torpedo fired by U-868 off Ushant. The minesweeper had been sailing alone from Horta to Plymouth when she was hit. The torpedo struck the stern, which caused significant damage and a slight list to port, but the ship refused to sink. However, no casualties were suffered. U-868 fired a coup de grâce which struck amidships on the starboard side of the ship at 19:35. Two members of the crew died in the explosion and several injured. The vessel settled slowly and sank after 35 minutes. Of the remaining crew, 49 died while awaiting rescue. 40 survivors were rescued by HMS Inglis 19 hours after the ship had been attacked with another picked up by HMS Loring while searching for the submarine.

== Notes ==
=== Sources ===
- Chesneau, Roger, ed. (1980). Conway's All the World's Fighting Ships 1922–1946. Greenwich, UK: Conway Maritime Press. ISBN 0-85177-146-7.
- Colledge, J. J.; Warlow, Ben (2006) [1969]. Ships of the Royal Navy: The Complete Record of All Fighting Ships of the Royal Navy from the 15th Century to the Present (3rd Rev ed.). London: Chatham Publishing. ISBN 978-1-86176-281-8. OCLC 67375475.
- Darlington, Robert A.; McKee, Fraser (1996). The Canadian Naval Chronicle 1939–1945: The Successes and Losses of the Canadian Navy in World War II. St. Catharines, Ontario: Vanwell Publishing. ISBN 1-55125-032-2.
- Macpherson, Ken (1997). Minesweepers of the Royal Canadian Navy 1938–1945. St. Catharines, Ontario: Vanwell Publishing Limited. ISBN 0-920277-55-1.
- Macpherson, Ken; Barrie, Ron (2002). The Ships of Canada's Naval Forces 1910–2002 (Third ed.). St. Catharines, Ontario: Vanwell Publishing. ISBN 1-55125-072-1.
- Schull, Joseph (1961). The Far Distant Ships: An Official Account of Canadian Naval Operations in the Second World War. Ottawa: Queen's Printer. OCLC 19974782.
