= Raymond Evans (USCG) =

United States Coast Guard officer

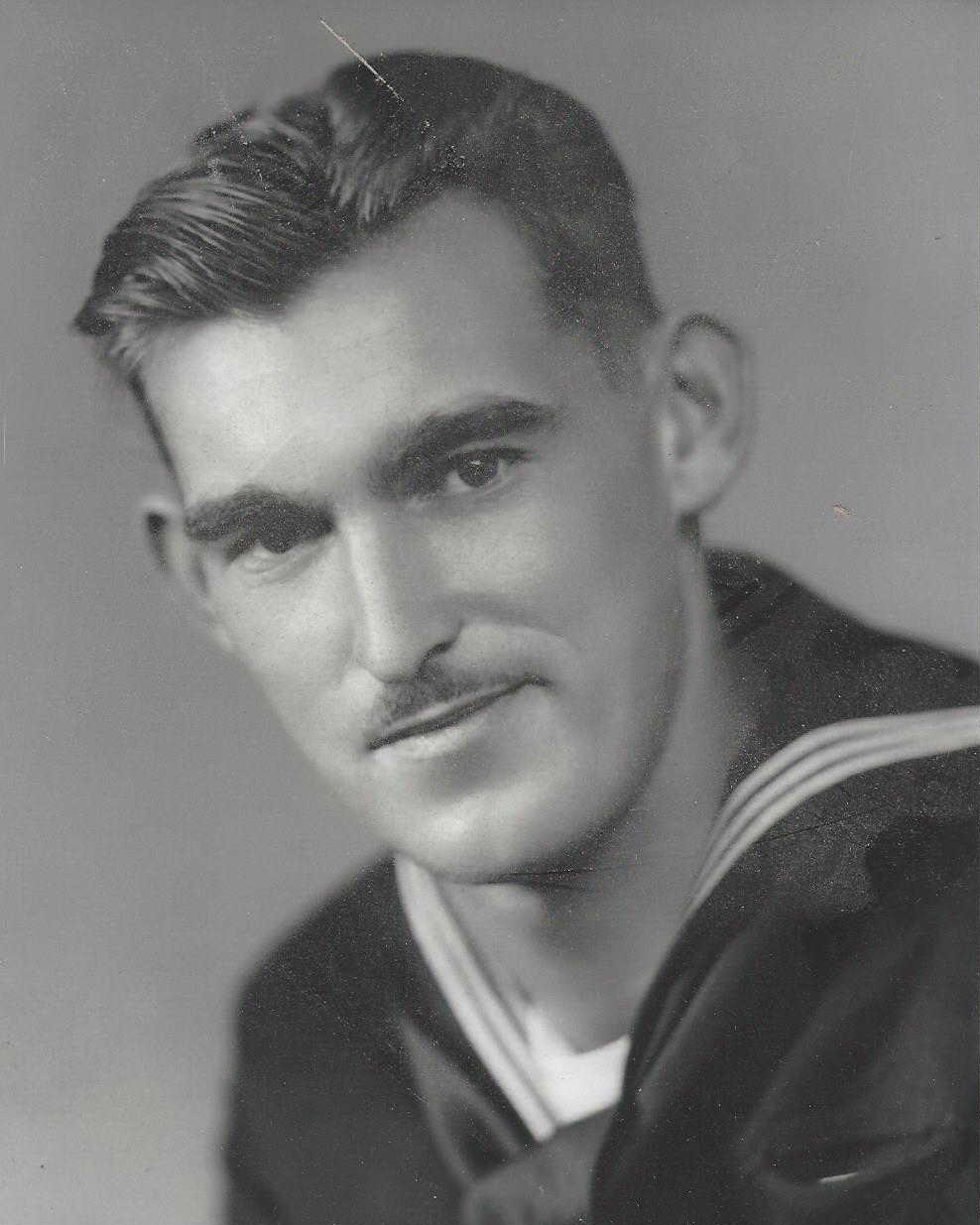
- Born: Raymond Joseph Evans Jr. February 22, 1921; Bellingham, Washington, U.S.
- Died: May 30, 2013 (aged 92); Tacoma, Washington, U.S.
- Spouse: Dorothy Viola Jackson (m. 1943)
- Military career
- Allegiance: United States of America
- Branch: United States Coast Guard
- Service years: 1939–1962
- Rank: Commander
- Nickname: "The Gold Dust Twins" (with Douglas Albert Munro)
- Commands: USCGC Ivy (WAGL-329)
- Conflicts: World War II
- Awards: Navy Cross (more)

Raymond Joseph Evans Jr. (February 22, 1921 – May 30, 2013) was a United States Coast Guardsman who was decorated with the Navy Cross for an act of "extraordinary heroism" during World War II. He is one of only six men in the conflict to have received the medal for actions performed while serving in the Coast Guard.

== Life and career ==
Evans was born in Bellingham, Washington and raised near Seattle. Unable to find work out of high school, he volunteered for military service shortly before the United States entered World War II. Evans and his shipmate, fellow Washingtonian Douglas Munro were known as the Gold Dust Twins because of their inseparability. During the Guadalcanal Campaign, Evans was assigned to Naval Operating Base Cactus at Lunga Point, where small boat operations were coordinated. At the Second Battle of the Matanikau in September 1942, he assisted in the evacuation of Marines whose position had been overrun by Japanese forces. Remaining at his post despite the other members of his crew, including Munro, being killed or wounded, he used one hand to steer the Higgins boat that he was piloting and another to fire his machine gun, drawing enemy fire towards himself and away from the Marines.

Evans received a commission, serving as an officer for the remainder of the war, and stayed in the Coast Guard until his retirement in 1962. Since his death in 2013, the cutter USCGC Raymond Evans and Ray Evans Medal, awarded annually to outstanding coxswains, have been named in his honor.

== Coast Guard service ==
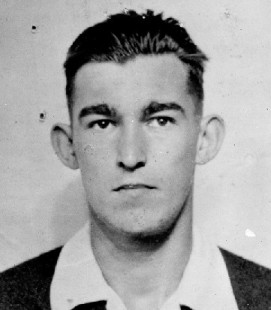
Enlistment photo of Evans in 1939

Evans and his friend Douglas Albert Munro enlisted in the Coast Guard in September, 1939, the month that Britain and France declared war on Nazi Germany. They served together on a Higgins boat landing craft off Guadalcanal during the Second Battle of the Matanikau. Munro died and was posthumously awarded the Medal of Honor; Evans received the Navy Cross.

Evans was later commissioned as a Coast Guard officer. He commanded USCGC Ivy (WAGL-329), was the executive officer of USCGC Chautauqua (WPG-41) and was the Captain of the Port in Houston. He served in the Coast Guard until 1962, accumulating 12 years of sea-time during his 23 years in the service. He retired at the rank of commander.

The Coast Guard awards an annual medal, named after Evans, to an outstanding coxswain. He died in 2013.

== The USCGC Raymond Evans ==
The Coast Guard accepted the delivery of USCGC Raymond Evans on June 25, 2014. She is the tenth Sentinel class cutter. All ships in the class are named after enlisted Coast Guard heroes.

== Decorations ==
As well as the Navy Cross, Evans received a number of other decorations, including two Presidential Unit Citations and the Coast Guard Good Conduct Medal.

| Navy Cross | Presidential Unit Citation with one battle star | Coast Guard Good Conduct Medal |
| American Defense Service Medal with one battle star | American Campaign Medal | Asiatic-Pacific Campaign Medal with five battle stars |
| European–African–Middle Eastern Campaign Medal | World War II Victory Medal | National Defense Service Medal with one service star |

=== Navy Cross citation ===
Citation:

The President of the United States of America takes pleasure in presenting the Navy Cross to Chief Signalman Raymond J. Evans, United States Coast Guard, for extraordinary heroism and devotion to duty in action against the enemy while serving as a member of the crew of a HIGGINS boat assisting in the rescue of a group of Marines of the 1st Battalion, 7th Marines, FIRST Marine Division, who had become surrounded by enemy Japanese forces on a beachhead of Guadalcanal, Solomons Islands, on 27 September 1942. Although he knew that his boat was to be used for the purpose of drawing enemy fire away from other craft evacuating the trapped Marines, Chief Signalman Evans, with utter disregard for his own personal safety, volunteered as a member of the crew. Gallantly remaining at his post during the entire evacuation and with every other member of his crew killed or wounded, he maintained control of the boat with one hand on the wheel and continued to fire his automatic machine gun with the other, until the last boat cleared the beach. By his great personal valor, skill and outstanding devotion to duty in the face of grave danger, he contributed directly to the success of his mission by saving the lives of many who otherwise might have perished.
