= Signalman (rank) =

Military rank

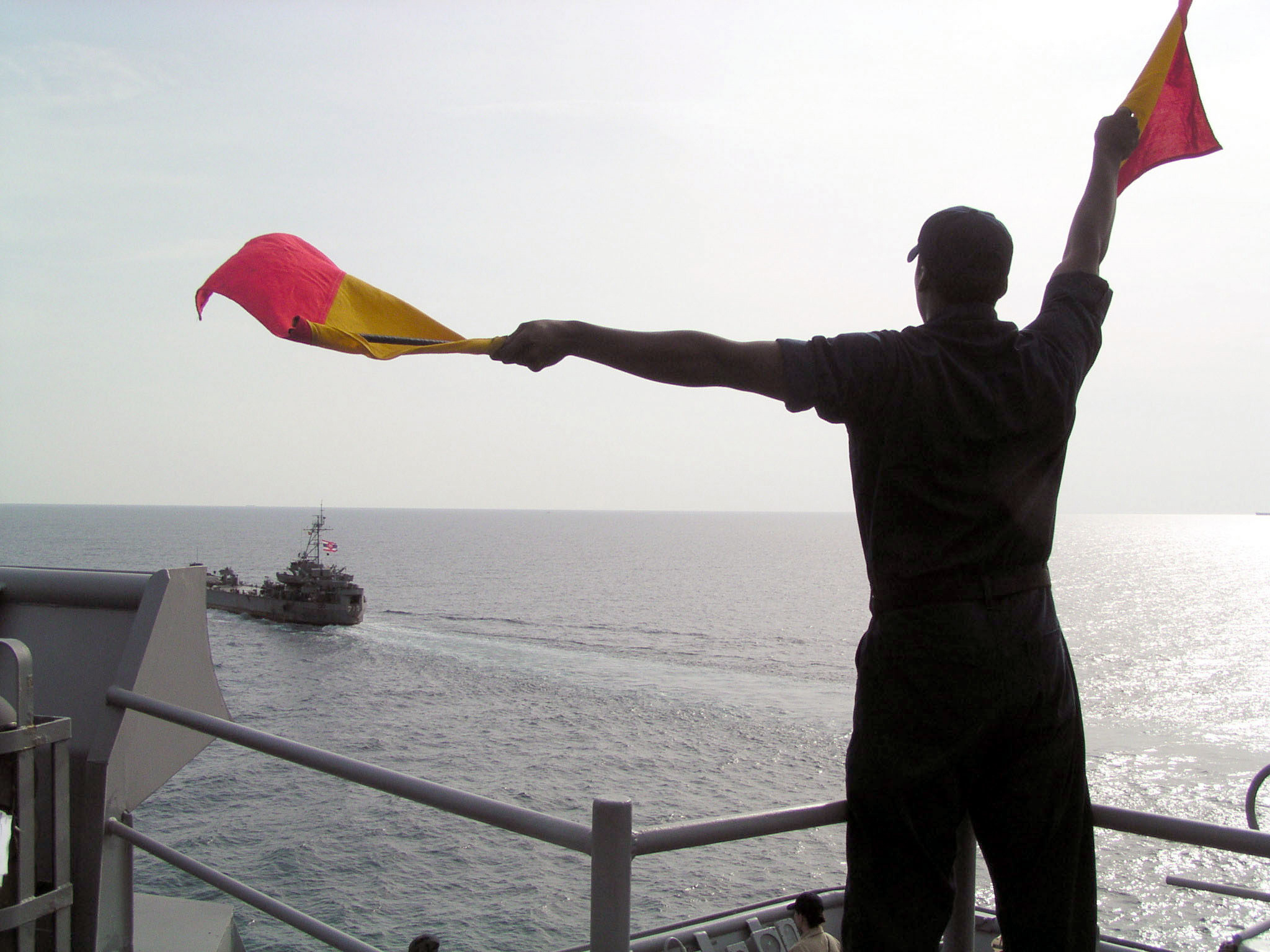
Signalman Seaman practices his semaphore.

Signalman was a U.S. Navy rating for sailors that specialized in visual communication. See Signaller for more about the roles of Signalmen.

== United States usage ==
=== U.S. Navy ===
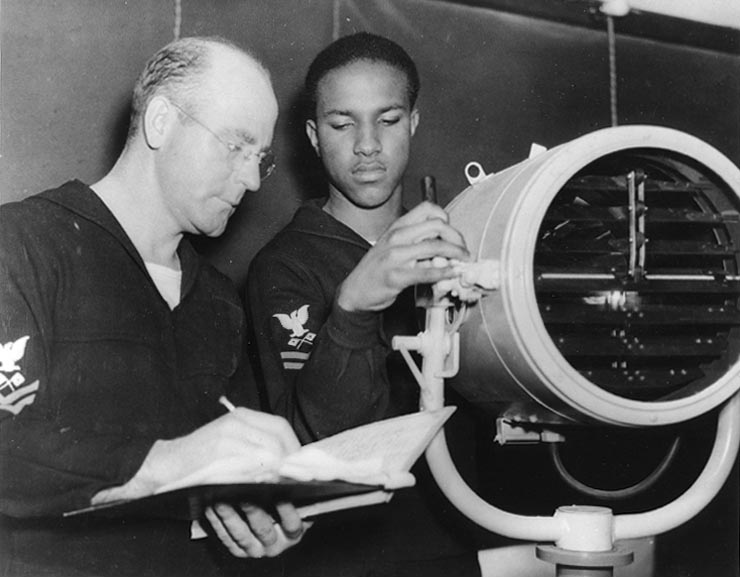
Signal lamp training during World War II.

A signal lamp (also called a signal searchlight) is a visual signaling device for optical communication.

In the U.S. Navy, "signalman" (nicknamed "Sigs", "Flags", or "Skivvy Waver") was a job field combining both visual communications, and advanced lookout skills. While there was certainly a Signalman rating before World War II (the Signalman rating is one of the oldest in the Navy), a specialized Signalman rating was established shortly after the war. Then, Signalmen were identified by the symbol of two crossed semaphore flags on the left sleeve of the uniform, integrated with their rank insignia. Signalmen were responsible for transmitting, receiving, encoding, decoding, and distributing messages obtained via the visual transmission systems of flag semaphore, visual Morse code, and flaghoist signalling.

The U.S. Navy disestablished the rating of Signalman in late 2003, reassigning visual communications duties to the Quartermaster rating. Signalmen were either absorbed into the Quartermaster rating, or allowed to switch to other job fields in the Navy. Many chose the Master-at-Arms rating, which expanded dramatically to meet the needs of the Navy in the war on terror.

== Australian usage ==
=== Royal Australian Navy ===
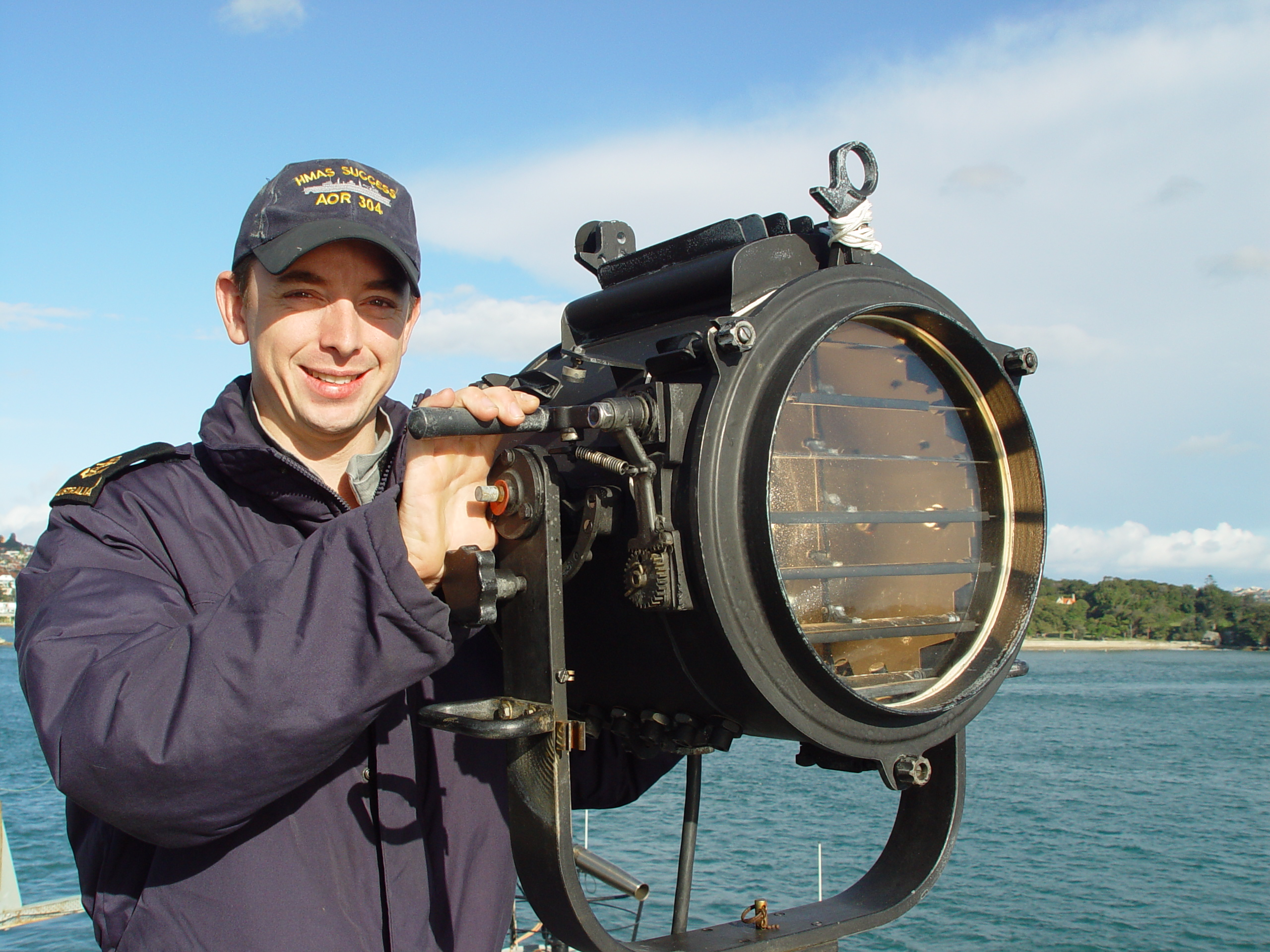
A Royal Australian Navy CIS Sailor sending a message using a 10" Signal Projector in 2005

Signalman was a trade category in use by the Royal Australian Navy until its amalgamation with the Radio Operator category in 1999. This new category, known as Communications and Information Systems, has retained traditional means of transmitting and receiving messages, such as flashing light and flags.

== British usage ==
=== British Army ===
In the British Army's Royal Corps of Signals, a private soldier's rank is a Signalman. Non-Royal Signals operators are referred to as Signallers; this is a qualification and not a rank.

== See also ==
- Signal corps
