= German submarine U-868 =

German World War II submarine

History

Nazi Germany
- Name: U-868
- Ordered: 25 August 1941
- Builder: DeSchiMAG AG Weser, Bremen
- Yard number: 1076
- Laid down: 11 March 1943
- Launched: 18 August 1943
- Commissioned: 23 December 1943
- Fate: Surrendered on 9 May 1945; Sunk on 30 November 1945 during Operation Deadlight

General characteristics
- Class & type: Type IXC/40 submarine
- Displacement: 1,144 t (1,126 long tons) surfaced; 1,257 t (1,237 long tons) submerged
- Length: 76.76 m (251 ft 10 in) o/a; 58.75 m (192 ft 9 in) pressure hull
- Beam: 6.86 m (22 ft 6 in) o/a 4.44 m (14 ft 7 in) pressure hull
- Height: 9.6 m (31 ft 6 in)
- Draught: 4.67 m (15 ft 4 in)
- Installed power: 4,400 PS (3,200 kW; 4,300 bhp) (diesels); 1,000 PS (740 kW; 990 shp) (electric)
- Propulsion: 2 shafts; 2 × diesel engines; 2 × electric motors
- Speed: 19 knots (35 km/h; 22 mph) surfaced; 7.3 knots (13.5 km/h; 8.4 mph) submerged
- Range: 13,850 nmi (25,650 km; 15,940 mi) at 10 knots (19 km/h; 12 mph) surfaced; 63 nmi (117 km; 72 mi) at 4 knots (7.4 km/h; 4.6 mph) submerged
- Test depth: 230 m (750 ft)
- Complement: 4 officers, 44 enlisted
- Armament: 6 × torpedo tubes (four bow, two stern); 22 × 53.3 cm (21 in) torpedoes; 1 × 3.7 cm (1.5 in) Flak M42; 2 × twin 2 cm (0.79 in) C/30 anti-aircraft guns

Service record
- Part of: 4th U-boat Flotilla 23 December 1943 – 31 July 1944; 2nd U-boat Flotilla 1 August – 30 September 1944; 33rd U-boat Flotilla 1 October 1944 – 5 May 1945
- Identification codes: M 16 800
- Commanders: Kptlt. Dietrich Rauch 23 December 1943 – 21 July 1944; Oblt.z.S. Eduard Turre 22 July 1944 – 9 May 1945
- Operations: 2 patrols: 1st patrol: 21 January – 18 February 1945; 2nd patrol: a. 14 March – 10 April 1945 b. 14 – 17 April 1945
- Victories: 1 warship sunk (672 tons)

German submarine U-868 was a Type IXC/40 U-boat of Nazi Germany's Kriegsmarine in the Second World War. The ship was ordered on 25 August 1941 and laid down on 11 March 1943. She was launched on 18 August 1943, at Bremen, Germany. She had two commanders over her operational lifespan, for the period from 23 December 1943 until 21 July 1944 it was Kapitänleutnant Dietrich Rauch, then Oberleutnant zur See Eduard Turre for the period from 22 July 1944 until 9 May 1945.

== Design ==
German Type IXC/40 submarines were slightly larger than the original Type IXCs. U-868 had a displacement of 1,144 tonnes (1,126 long tons) when at the surface and 1,257 tonnes (1,237 long tons) while submerged. The U-boat had a total length of 76.76 m (251 ft 10 in), a pressure hull length of 58.75 m (192 ft 9 in), a beam of 6.86 m (22 ft 6 in), a height of 9.60 m (31 ft 6 in), and a draught of 4.67 m (15 ft 4 in). The submarine was powered by two MAN M 9 V 40/46 supercharged four-stroke, nine-cylinder diesel engines producing a total of 4,400 metric horsepower (3,240 kW; 4,340 shp) for use while surfaced, two Siemens-Schuckert 2 GU 345/34 double-acting electric motors producing a total of 1,000 shaft horsepower (1,010 PS; 750 kW) for use while submerged. She had two shafts and two 1.92 m (6 ft) propellers. The boat was capable of operating at depths of up to 230 metres (750 ft).

The submarine had a maximum surface speed of 18.3 knots (33.9 km/h; 21.1 mph) and a maximum submerged speed of 7.3 knots (13.5 km/h; 8.4 mph). When submerged, the boat could operate for 63 nautical miles (117 km; 72 mi) at 4 knots (7.4 km/h; 4.6 mph); when surfaced, she could travel 13,850 nautical miles (25,650 km; 15,940 mi) at 10 knots (19 km/h; 12 mph). U-868 was fitted with six 53.3 cm (21 in) torpedo tubes (four fitted at the bow and two at the stern), 22 torpedoes, and a 3.7 cm (1.5 in) Flak M42 as well as two twin 2 cm (0.79 in) C/30 anti-aircraft guns. The boat had a complement of forty-eight.

== Service history ==
In her operations, she sank a single warship, the 672 tons HMS Guysborough on 17 March 1945.

=== Fate ===
U-868 was surrendered by her captain on 9 May 1945 at Bergen in Norway. She was then transferred to Loch Ryan 30 May 1945 for Operation Deadlight, where a large number of U-boats were sunk in one operation. U-868 was sunk on 30 November 1945 during operation.

== Summary of raiding history ==
Date	Name	Nationality	Tonnage (Note: Merchant ship tonnages are in gross register tons. Military vessels are listed by tons displacement.)	Fate
17 March 1945	HMCS Guysborough	Royal Canadian Navy	672	Sunk

== Bibliography ==
- Busch, Rainer; Röll, Hans-Joachim (1999). German U-boat commanders of World War II: a biographical dictionary. Translated by Brooks, Geoffrey. London, Annapolis, Md: Greenhill Books, Naval Institute Press. ISBN 1-55750-186-6.
- Busch, Rainer; Röll, Hans-Joachim (1999). Der U-Boot-Krieg, 1939-1945: Deutsche U-Boot-Verluste von September 1939 bis Mai 1945 [German U-boat losses from September 1939 to May 1945] (in German). Vol. IV. Hamburg, Berlin, Bonn: Mittler. ISBN 3-8132-0514-2.
- Gröner, Eric; Jung, Dieter; Maass, Martin (1991). German Warships 1815-1945: U-boats and Mine Warfare Vessels. Vol. 2. Translated by Thomas, Keith; Magowan, Rachel. London: Conway Maritime Press. ISBN 0-85177-593-4.
