= USS Douglas A. Munro =

US Navy John C. Butler-class destroyer escort

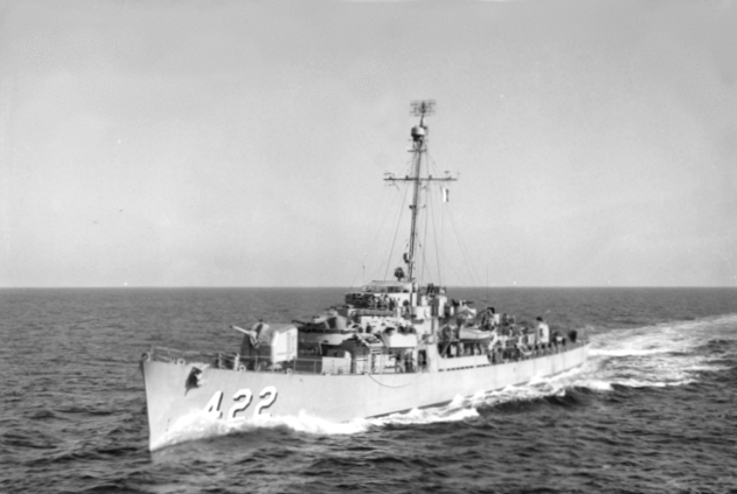
- USS Douglas A. Munro in 1951

History

United States
- Laid down: 31 January 1944
- Launched: 8 March 1944
- Commissioned: 11 July 1944
- Decommissioned: 15 January 1947
- In service: 28 February 1951
- Out of service: 24 June 1960
- Stricken: 1 December 1965
- Fate: Sunk as target January 1966

General characteristics
- Class & type: John C. Butler-class destroyer escort
- Displacement: 1,350 long tons (1,372 t)
- Length: 306 ft (93 m) overall
- Beam: 36 ft 10 in (11.23 m)
- Draft: 13 ft 4 in (4.06 m) maximum
- Propulsion: 2 boilers, 2 geared steam turbines, 12,000 shp, 2 screws
- Speed: 24 knots (44 km/h)
- Range: 6,000 nmi at 12 knots (22 km/h)
- Complement: 14 officers, 201 enlisted
- Armament: 2 × 5 in (130 mm) (2 × 1); 4 × 40 mm AA (2 × 2); 10 × 20 mm guns AA; 3 × 21 inch (533 mm) torpedo tubes; 1 Hedgehog; 8 depth charge projectors; 2 depth charge tracks

USS Douglas A. Munro (DE-422) was a John C. Butler-class destroyer escort acquired by the U.S. Navy during World War II. The primary purpose of the destroyer escort was to escort and protect ships in convoy, in addition to other tasks as assigned, such as patrol or radar picket.

Douglas A. Munro was named in honor of Signalman First Class Douglas Albert Munro, USCG, who was awarded the Medal of Honor posthumously for his brave actions during the Guadalcanal campaign.

Douglas A. Munro was launched 8 March 1944 by Brown Shipbuilding Co., Houston, Texas; sponsored by Lieutenant (junior grade) Edith Munro, USCGR, mother of Petty Officer Munro; and commissioned 11 July 1944.

== History ==
=== World War II ===
From 20 September to 19 October 1944 Douglas A. Munro served as escort for Vixen carrying Admiral R. E. Ingersoll, Commander-in-Chief, Atlantic Fleet on a tour of Caribbean defenses. She voyaged to Casablanca as escort for Kasaan Bay between 24 October and 14 November.

She then left Norfolk, Virginia, 7 December, for the Pacific Ocean. After exercising at Manus, she sailed to Biak, Schouten Islands, to pick up a convoy of LSTs and merchant ships bound for Lingayen Gulf, arriving there 9 February.

Douglas A. Munro returned to San Pedro Bay, Leyte, and on the 20th sailed to escort a convoy of U.S. Army tugs to Subic Bay. Upon her arrival a week later she was assigned to screen a minesweeping unit clearing the San Bernardino Strait and the approaches to Manila Bay, and also supported naval and amphibious operations on nearby shores. She operated at Subic Bay until 6 May.

Douglas A. Munro served in the assault and occupation of Borneo from 19 May to 5 July 1945. She escorted supply convoys from Leyte, bombarded enemy positions, and served as antisubmarine patrol vessel. She escorted transports from Ulithi to the Philippines from 19 to 26 July, then patrolled against submarines between Leyte and Okinawa until the end of the war.

Douglas A. Munro cleared Leyte 6 September to join the South China Force, arriving in the approaches to the Yangtze River on the 19th. She served with this force until 5 January 1946 when she got underway from Hong Kong for the U.S. West Coast, arriving at San Francisco, California, 1 February. Moving to San Diego, California, 30 March, she was placed out of commission in reserve there 15 January 1947.

=== Korean War ===
USS Douglas A. Munro was recommissioned on 28 February 1951. On 8 July of the same year, the Douglas A. Munro sailed from San Diego to Pearl Harbor. During their passage, the boat and crew rescued a civilian who had been washed overboard during the Transpacific Yacht Race. After training until 29 October, the DE-422 was on her way to Korean waters to serve with the United Nations Blockading and Escort Force; participating in the siege and bombardment of Wonsan Harbor. The boat was also active in rescue work. While on patrol in the Formosa Straits on 25 January 1952 the Douglas A. Munro aided the Chinese Nationalist dredger Chien Wong. Later, on 12 February, DE-422 assisted the British merchant vessel SS Wing Sang who had been attacked by Communist pirates. Douglas A. Munro, under the command of Struyk, also rescued two crew members of a crashed torpedo bomber and picked up two U.S. Marine colonels whose helicopter had crashed on an island in the Han River estuary. The USS Douglas A. Munro returned to Pearl Harbor on 24 May 1952 for overhaul and training.

== Trust Territory operations ==
During her second tour of duty in the Korean War, from 9 May to 11 December 1953, Douglas A. Munro served with task force TF 95 on escort and patrol duty. During this deployment she rescued the crew of a downed patrol plane. She put out from Pearl Harbor again 1 July 1954 to patrol in the Marianas and Carolines, United Nations Trust Territories under American administration, and visited more than 100 islands in the South Pacific before returning to Pearl Harbor 31 January 1955.

Sailing from Pearl Harbor 22 October 1955 Douglas A. Munro served in the western Pacific until 14 January 1956 when she returned to patrol the Trust Territories. On the 27th while conducting a surveillance of the Bonins, she discovered a Japanese fishing vessel violating the 3-mile limit and placed a prize crew aboard Harakawa Maru to take her to the Commissioner for the Trust Territories. Douglas A. Munro completed her tour at Pearl Harbor 24 March 1956.

On 23 August 1958. USS Douglas A. Munro, along with USS Edmonds (DE-406) was tasked with escorting two Chinese Nationalist LSTs (Landing Ship, Tank) into the beaches at Quemoy and Matsu to assist in evacuating refugees from those islands, while under Communist Chinese artillery shelling. Several years later the Armed Forces Expeditionary Medal was created and awarded to members of the ships involved in the action.

In her annual deployments from 1956 to 1959, Douglas A. Munro served both on the Taiwan Patrol, and in surveillance of the Trust Territories. Her last cruise, from August 1959 through March 1960, was devoted solely to patrol of the Pacific islands under American administration.

== Fate ==
She was decommissioned and placed in reserve at Mare Island 24 June 1960. On 1 December 1965 she was struck from the Navy List, and, in January 1966 she was sunk as a target.

== Awards ==
Douglas A. Munro received three battle stars for Korean War service.
