= John Hart (Canadian politician) =

Canadian politician

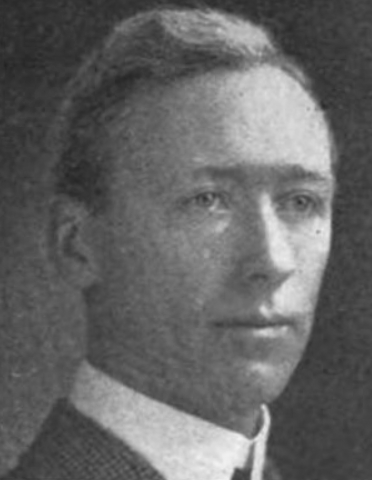

23rd Premier of British Columbia
- In office December 9, 1941 – December 29, 1947
- Monarch: George VI
- Lieutenant Governor: William C. Woodward; Charles Arthur Banks
- Preceded by: Thomas Dufferin Pattullo
- Succeeded by: Byron Ingemar Johnson

Member of the Legislative Assembly for Victoria City
- In office November 2, 1933 – June 15, 1949 Serving with Herbert Anscomb, Robert Connell, Byron Ingemar Johnson, Joseph Douglas Hunter, William Thomas Straith, Nancy Hodges
- Preceded by: James Harry Beatty; Reginald Hayward; Joshua Hinchcliffe; Harold Despard Twigg
- Succeeded by: Daniel John Proudfoot
- In office September 14, 1916 – June 20, 1924 Serving with George Bell, Harlan Carey Brewster, Henry Charles Hall, Joseph Clearihue, Joshua Hinchcliffe, John Oliver
- Preceded by: Henry Frederick William Behnsen; Frederick Davey; Richard McBride; Henry Broughton Thomson
- Succeeded by: Robert Allan Gus Lyons

Personal details
- Born: March 31, 1879 Mohill, County Leitrim, Ireland
- Died: April 7, 1957 (aged 78) Victoria, British Columbia
- Party: British Columbia Liberal Party
- Spouse: Harriett (Mackay)

John Hart (March 31, 1879 – April 7, 1957) was the 23rd premier of British Columbia, Canada, from December 9, 1941, to December 29, 1947.

== Biography ==
John Hart was born in Mohill, County Leitrim, Ireland, the son of an Irish farmer who was also named John Hart. He came to Victoria in 1898.

Hart worked in the finance industry and founded his own firm in 1909. In 1908, he married Harriet McKay. He entered politics in the 1916 election, elected to the provincial legislature as a Liberal member from Victoria City. He served as minister of finance from 1917 to 1924, and from 1933 to 1946. Hart retired from politics to attend to his business from 1924 to 1933. At various times, he also served as Minister of Industries (1922 to 1924 and 1933 to 1937), Minister of Lands (1944), Minister of Public Works (1942) and Minister of Railways (1942).

Hart became premier following the 1941 election when Pattullo's Liberals failed to win a majority. Unlike Pattullo, Hart was willing to form a coalition government with the Conservative Party. This allowed the Liberal-Conservative coalition to govern with a majority in order to block the socialist Cooperative Commonwealth Federation from forming the government.

From 1941 to 1945, Hart governed at a time of wartime scarcity, when all major government projects were postponed. Hart's coalition government was re-elected in the 1945 election by a decisive margin. In that contest, Liberals and Conservatives ran under the same banner for the first time in BC history.

After 1945, Hart undertook an ambitious program of rural electrification, hydroelectric and highway construction. Hart's most significant projects were the construction of Highway 97 to northern British Columbia (which is named in his honour) and the re-launch of the Bridge River Power Project, which was the first major hydroelectric development in British Columbia. He established the BC Power Commission, a forerunner of BC Hydro, to provide power to smaller communities that were not serviced by private utilities.

In December 1947, he retired as both finance minister and premier. Hart was named speaker for the assembly in 1948. He did not seek reelection in 1949 and returned to business.

Hart was one of the few BC premiers who left office neither defeated nor under a cloud. He died in Victoria in 1957, aged 78 years, having led a distinguished life of public service. He is interred in the Royal Oak Burial Park in Saanich.

The 405 km John Hart Highway between Prince George and Dawson Creek is named for him, as is the Hart Highlands neighbourhood of Prince George and the John Hart Dam (Hydroelectric) in Campbell River.
