= John Herbert Turner =

Canadian politician (1834-1923)

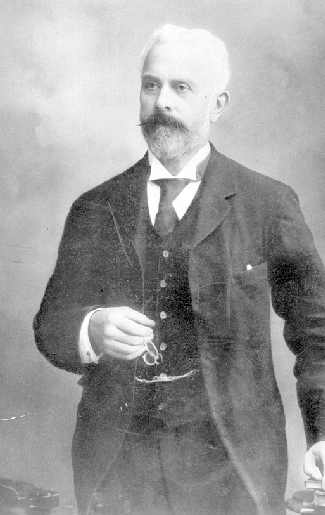

11th Premier of British Columbia
- In office March 4, 1895 – August 8, 1898
- Monarch: Victoria
- Lieutenant Governor: Edgar Dewdney; Thomas Robert McInnes
- Preceded by: Theodore Davie
- Succeeded by: Charles Augustus Semlin

MLA for Victoria City
- In office July 7, 1886 – October 3, 1903 Serving with Robert Beaven, Theodore Davie, Edward Gawler Prior, John Grant, George Lawson Milne, John Braden, Henry Dallas Helmcken, Robert Paterson Rithet, Richard Hall, Albert Edward McPhillips
- Preceded by: Montague William Tyrwhitt-Drake
- Succeeded by: Richard Low Drury

13th Mayor of Victoria
- In office 1879–1881
- Preceded by: Roderick Finlayson
- Succeeded by: Noah Shakespeare

Personal details
- Born: May 7, 1834 Claydon, England
- Died: December 9, 1923 (aged 89) Richmond, England
- Party: None
- Spouse: Elizabeth Eilbeck (m. 1860)
- Children: 1 son
- Occupation: businessman
- Profession: politician

John Herbert Turner (May 7, 1834 – December 9, 1923) was a British Columbia politician. Born in Claydon, Suffolk, England, Turner moved to British North America and worked as a merchant in Halifax and Charlottetown. In 1862 he moved to Victoria, on Vancouver Island, and founded Turner, Beeton and Co., which was involved in salmon canning, insurance and finance, importing and wholesaling.

Turner entered politics serving as mayor of Victoria from 1876 to 1881 and entered the provincial legislature in 1886 in the constituency of Victoria City. He served as minister of finance under successive premiers from 1887 to 1895 and as the 11th premier of British Columbia from 1895 to 1898. From 1901 to 1915 he was the province's representative in London where he retired. He died in Richmond in 1923.
