= Robert Beaven =

Canadian politician (1836-1920)

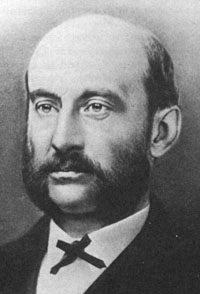
- Hon. Robert Beaven

6th Premier of British Columbia
- In office June 13, 1882 – January 29, 1883
- Monarch: Victoria
- Lieutenant Governor: Clement Francis Cornwall
- Preceded by: George Anthony Walkem
- Succeeded by: William Smithe

MLA for Victoria City
- In office October 16, 1871 – July 7, 1894 Serving with John Foster McCreight, Simeon Duck, James Trimble, James W. Douglas, Andrew Charles Elliott, James Smith Drummond, John W. Williams, William Wilson, Theodore Davie, Montague Tyrwhitt-Drake, Edward Gawler Prior, John Herbert Turner, John Grant, George Lawson Milne
- Preceded by: first member
- Succeeded by: John Braden

Personal details
- Born: January 20, 1836 England
- Died: September 18, 1920 (aged 84) Victoria, British Columbia
- Party: None
- Spouse: Susan Sibbald Ritchie (m. 1866)

Robert Beaven (January 20, 1836 – September 18, 1920), son of James Beaven, was a British Columbia politician and businessman. Beaven moved to British Columbia from Toronto, where he had been educated at Upper Canada College, because of the gold rush. He entered business in Victoria, which was then the capital of the Colony of Vancouver Island. After the colony's union with British Columbia, Beaven became involved with politics as secretary of Amor De Cosmos' Confederation League which advocated that the colony enter Canadian Confederation.

== Personal life ==
Beaven was married to Susan Sibbald Ritchie with whom he had two sons, as well as a daughter, who was married to the Royal Navy captain Stanley Venn Ellis and later remarried to the 2nd Viscount Churchill after the formers death at the Battle of Jutland.

Robert Beaven died in 1920 and was interred in the Ross Bay Cemetery in Victoria.

== Career ==
Beaven was elected to the provincial legislature in 1871, the year of union with Canada, and served in the cabinets of De Cosmos and his successor George Anthony Walkem as chief commissioner of land and works. He was accused by the opposition of corruption and was criticised for not opening up land for settlement quickly enough as well as running up the deficit. Beaven was in opposition during the government of Andrew Charles Elliott but rejoined the government when Walkem became premier for a second time in 1878 and became minister of finance and agriculture. Due to a shortage of revenues he instituted a poll tax in 1881. In 1882 Beaven became premier of the province but many of his supporters were defeated in the subsequent July election and Beaven ruled with a minority.

As Premier he hosted the three-month visit to British Columbia of the Governor General of Canada, the Marquess of Lorne, and his wife Princess Louise, offering to make the princess Queen of Vancouver Island. She declined.

In January 1883 Beaven attempted to introduce a legislative program but his government was brought down by a Motion of No Confidence and he resigned on January 29, 1883.

Beaven remained an MLA and leader of the opposition until 1894 when he lost his seat in an election after having served in the legislature for twenty-three years. He also served three terms as mayor of Victoria, British Columbia in the 1890s.

Following the 1898 election, no party had a majority and the lieutenant-governor Thomas Robert McInnes passed over the former premier John Herbert Turner and asked Beaven to form a government despite the fact that he had been out of the legislature for four years. Leading members of the legislature refused to support Beaven and he was unable to form a cabinet.
