= 10th Parliament of British Columbia =

The 10th Legislative Assembly of British Columbia sat from 1903 to 1906. The members were elected in the British Columbia general election held in October 1903. This election was the first in British Columbia to be contested by competing political parties. The British Columbia Conservative Party led by Richard McBride, having won the majority of seats, formed the government.

Charles Edward Pooley served as speaker.

== Members of the 10th Parliament ==
The following members were elected to the assembly in 1903.:

Member	Electoral district	Party	First elected / previously elected	No.# of term(s)
William Wallace Burns McInnes	Alberni	Liberal	1900	2nd term
William Manson (1905)	Alberni	Conservative	1905	1st term
Henry Esson Young	Atlin	Conservative	1903	1st term
Harry Jones	Cariboo	Liberal	1903	1st term
James Murphy	Cariboo	Liberal	1903	1st term
Charles William Munro	Chilliwhack	Liberal	1898	3rd term
Wilmer Cleveland Wells	Columbia	Liberal	1899	3rd term
Robert Grant	Comox	Conservative	1903	1st term
John Newell Evans	Cowichan	Liberal	1903	1st term
James Horace King	Cranbrook	Liberal	1903	1st term
John Oliver	Delta	Liberal	1900	2nd term
Richard McBride	Dewdney	Conservative	1898	3rd term
Charles Edward Pooley	Esquimalt	Conservative	1882	7th term
William Roderick Ross	Fernie	Conservative	1903	1st term
George Arthur Fraser	Grand Forks	Conservative	1903	1st term
John Robert Brown	Greenwood	Liberal	1903	1st term
Thomas Wilson Paterson	The Islands	Liberal	1902	2nd term
Frederick John Fulton	Kamloops	Conservative	1900	2nd term
Robert Francis Green	Kaslo	Conservative	1898	3rd term
Archibald McDonald	Lillooet	Conservative	1903	1st term
James Hurst Hawthornthwaite	Nanaimo City	Socialist	1901	2nd term
John Houston	Nelson City	Conservative	1900	2nd term
Parker Williams	Newcastle	Socialist	1903	1st term
Thomas Gifford	New Westminster City	Conservative	1901	2nd term
Price Ellison	Okanagan	Conservative	1898	3rd term
Thomas Taylor	Revelstoke	Conservative	1900	2nd term
Francis Lovett Carter-Cotton	Richmond	Conservative	1890, (Note: Vancouver City) 1903	4th term*
James Alexander MacDonald	Rossland City	Liberal	1903	1st term
Henry Ernest Tanner	Saanich	Liberal	1903	1st term
Lytton Wilmot Shatford	Similkameen	Conservative	1903	1st term
Charles William Digby Clifford	Skeena	Conservative	1898	3rd term
William Davidson	Slocan	Labour (Note: Not a provincial party. The riding had its own local autonomous Labour party.)	1903	1st term
William John Bowser	Vancouver City	Conservative	1903	1st term
James Ford Garden	Vancouver City	Conservative	1900	2nd term
Alexander Henry Boswell MacGowan	Vancouver City	Conservative	1903	1st term
Robert Garnett Tatlow	Vancouver City	Conservative	1900	2nd term
Charles Wilson	Vancouver City	Conservative	1882, (Note: Cariboo) 1903	2nd term*
William George Cameron	Victoria City	Liberal	1903	1st term
Richard Low Drury	Victoria City	Liberal	1903	1st term
Richard Hall	Victoria City	Liberal	1898	3rd term
James Dugald McNiven	Victoria City	Liberal	1903	1st term
Stuart Alexander Henderson	Yale	Liberal	1903	1st term
Harry Wright	Ymir	Conservative	1903	1st term

== Party standings ==
Affiliation	Members
Conservative	22
Liberal	17
Socialist	2
Labour	1
Total	42
Government Majority	2

== By-elections ==
By-elections were held for the following members appointed to the provincial cabinet, as was required at the time:

- Charles Wilson, Attorney General, elected November 21, 1903
- Frederick John Fulton, President of Executive Council, acclaimed June 1, 1904

By-elections were held to replace members for various other reasons:

Electoral district	Member elected	Party	Election date	Reason
Lillooet	Archibald McDonald	Conservative	August 16, 1904	election of A. McDonald declared null and void by act of legislature
Alberni	William Manson	Conservative	July 22, 1905	W.W.B. McInnes named commissioner of the Yukon May 20, 1905
