= Robert Connell (politician) =

Canadian politician

The Reverend Robert Connell
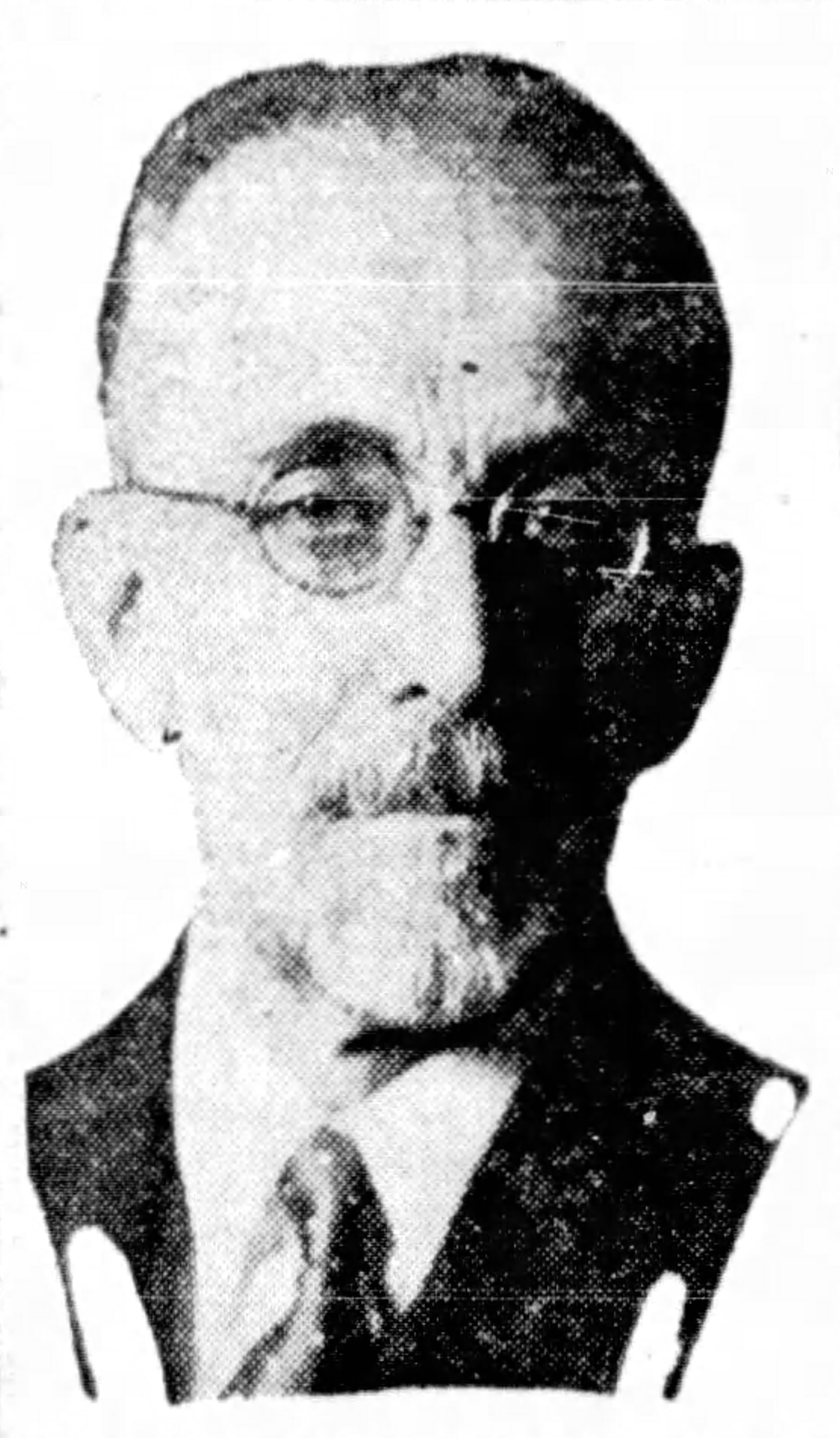
- Connell c. 1936

Leader of the Opposition of British Columbia
- In office November 15, 1933 – October 26, 1937
- Preceded by: Duff Pattullo
- Succeeded by: Frank Porter Patterson

Leader of the Co-operative Commonwealth Federation (British Columbia Section)
- In office c. May 1933 – August 1, 1936
- Preceded by: New office
- Succeeded by: Harold Winch

Member of the Legislative Assembly of British Columbia for Victoria City
- In office November 2, 1933 – June 1, 1937 Serving with Herbert Anscomb, John Hart, and Boss Johnson

Personal details
- Born: June 4, 1871 Liverpool, England
- Died: 13 November 1957 (aged 86)
- Party: British Columbia Social Constructive Party (1936 – c. 1937); Co-operative Commonwealth Federation (1932–1936)
- Spouse: Janie Hodson (m. 1898)
- Home town: Around Glasgow, Scotland

Ecclesiastical career
- Religion: Christianity (Anglican)
- Church: Church of England in Canada
- Ordained: 1895 (deacon); 1896 (priest)
- Offices held: Archdeacon of Comox

Robert Connell (June 4, 1871 – November 13, 1957) was a Scottish-Canadian Anglican priest and politician in British Columbia. He was the first leader of the Co-operative Commonwealth Federation party in British Columbia (now the British Columbia New Democratic Party).

== Biography ==
Born in Liverpool, England, to Scottish parents and raised around Glasgow, Scotland, Connell worked for a shipping company before coming to Canada at the age of 17. After seven years working in various jobs he moved to Calgary to train to become a Church of England minister. He was ordained a deacon in 1895 a priest in 1896 and moved to Victoria, British Columbia, in 1901 after several years of mission work in Alberta. He served as a vicar in various parishes (including two years in California) before retiring from the pulpit in 1923.

Connell was also involved with education occasionally teaching art at a private boys' school and botany at Victoria High School. He also wrote a weekly column on nature and geology for the Victoria Daily Times and later the Victoria Daily Colonist.

In 1932, Connell joined the League for Social Reconstruction and also became leader of the BC Reconstruction Party formed by some supporters of the LSR in British Columbia. The short-lived party quickly joined the Co-operative Commonwealth Federation after it was formed in August of the same year.

Connell agreed to run for the provincial legislature as a CCF candidate in the 1933 provincial election, the new party won seven seats, including Connell's Victoria City riding. With the collapse of the governing Conservative Party, which was in such disarray it decided not to run any candidates, and the election of a Liberal government the CCF found itself as the official opposition in the British Columbia legislature. The party caucus met and named Connell as Leader of the Opposition.

Connell was a fervent believer of the social gospel movement. He was a moderate when compared to many more radical members of the party, including a majority of the party executive and much of the caucus, many who came to the CCF from the Socialist Party of Canada (SPC).

Connell urged co-operation with the Liberals and Conservatives on certain issues and was criticized by CCFers such as T. Guy Sheppard for refusing to call for a general strike against the Liberal government of Duff Pattullo. He also was the target of criticism for his opposition to class-based politics in the pages of the SPC's newspaper, The BC Clarion.

Tensions between Connell and the left wing of the party emerged publicly when he stood up in the legislature to denounce the radical language of fellow CCF MP Ernest Winch who had given a speech on the merits of communism. At the 1936 party convention, Connell survived a vote of non-confidence in his leadership by a margin of 138–76. Connell's leadership again came under fire when he publicly opposed a resolution in favour of socializing banking and credit several weeks after it was approved.

In July 1936, he issued a statement to the party executive and to the media revoking his support for the party platform approved by the convention three weeks earlier. The policy disagreement, which came to be known as the "Connell Affair" brought to a head a conflict in the party between moderates such as Connell and "revolutionary" Marxists such as Winch.

Connell was expelled from the party in August and he promptly formed a new political party, the Social Constructives, with three fellow MLAs from the CCF's seven-person caucus – Jack Price, R. B. Swailes, and Ernest Bakewell. Also joining Connell was Victor Midgely, a former leader of the One Big Union, and Bill Pritchard, editor and owner of The Commonwealth. Pritchard's defection left the BC CCF without a party newspaper.

With four MLAs in Connell's new Social Constructive caucus versus three remaining in the CCF, Connell was able to retain his position as Leader of the Official Opposition for the remainder of the term of the legislature.

The Social Constructives fielded 14 candidates (out of a possible 48) in the 1937 general election, but failed to win any seats. The party received 8,086 votes to the CCF's 119,400.

With the end of his political career, Connell returned to ecclesiastical work, becoming Archdeacon of Comox in 1940.

Legislative Assembly of British Columbia
Preceded by James Harry Beatty	Member of the Legislative Assembly of British Columbia for Victoria City; 1933–1937; Served alongside: Herbert Anscomb, John Hart, and Boss Johnson	Succeeded by Herbert Anscomb
Preceded by Reginald Hayward	Member of the Legislative Assembly of British Columbia for Victoria City; 1933–1937; Served alongside: Herbert Anscomb, John Hart, and Boss Johnson	Succeeded by John Hart
Preceded by Joshua Hinchcliffe	Member of the Legislative Assembly of British Columbia for Victoria City; 1933–1937; Served alongside: Herbert Anscomb, John Hart, and Boss Johnson	Succeeded by Joseph Douglas Hunter
Preceded by Harold Despard Twigg	Member of the Legislative Assembly of British Columbia for Victoria City; 1933–1937; Served alongside: Herbert Anscomb, John Hart, and Boss Johnson	Succeeded by William Thomas Straith
Political offices
Preceded by Duff Pattullo	Leader of the Opposition in the British Columbia Legislature; 1933–1937	Succeeded by Royal Maitland
Party political offices
New office	Leader of the Co-operative Commonwealth; Federation, British Columbia Section; 1933–1939	Succeeded by Harold Winch
