= Edward Gawler Prior =

Canadian politician

Colonel The Honourable Edward Gawler Prior PC
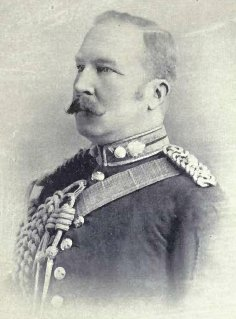

11th Lieutenant Governor of British Columbia
- In office 9 December 1919 – 12 December 1920
- Monarch: George V
- Governor General: The Duke of Devonshire
- Premier: John Oliver
- Preceded by: Francis Stillman Barnard
- Succeeded by: Walter Cameron Nichol

15th Premier of British Columbia
- In office 21 November 1902 – 1 June 1903
- Monarch: Edward VII
- Lieutenant Governor: Henri-Gustave Joly de Lotbinière
- Preceded by: James Dunsmuir
- Succeeded by: Richard McBride

Member of the Canadian Parliament for Victoria
- In office 23 January 1888 – 2 December 1901 Serving with Edgar Crow Baker, Thomas Earle
- Preceded by: Noah Shakespeare
- Succeeded by: George Riley

MLA for Victoria City
- In office 7 July 1886 – 23 January 1888 Serving with Robert Beaven, Theodore Davie, John Herbert Turner
- Preceded by: Montague Tyrwhitt-Drake
- Succeeded by: Simeon Duck
- In office 10 March 1902 – 16 June 1903 Serving with Richard Hall, Henry Dallas Helmcken, Albert Edward McPhillips
- Preceded by: John Herbert Turner
- Succeeded by: James Dugald McNiven

Personal details
- Born: 21 May 1853 Dallowgill, Yorkshire, England
- Died: 12 December 1920 (aged 67) Victoria, British Columbia
- Party: Conservative
- Spouse: Suzette Work (m. 1878)
- Children: 1 son and 3 daughters
- Occupation: Land surveyor, merchant, mining engineer
- Profession: politician

Edward Gawler Prior, PC (21 May 1853 – 12 December 1920) was a mining engineer and politician in British Columbia.

== Early life ==
Prior was born in Dallowgill, Yorkshire, England, and worked as a mining engineer in England until 1873. He then moved to British Columbia, settling in Nanaimo and took employment as assistant manager of the Vancouver Coal Mining & Land Co., Ltd. In 1878 he resigned and was appointed Inspector of Mines for the British Columbia government. He left that position and went into business as an iron and hardware merchant in 1880.

== Political career ==
Prior was first elected to the provincial legislature in 1886. In 1888, Prior won a seat in the House of Commons of Canada as a Conservative. From December 1895 to July 1896 and 1897 Prior served as Controller of Inland Revenue in the cabinets of Prime Minister Sir Mackenzie Bowell and his successor Sir Charles Tupper.

He lost his seat in 1901 due to violations of election rules. He moved to provincial politics and was elected to the Legislative Assembly of British Columbia in 1902 becoming minister of mines. In 1902 he became the 15th premier leading the province's last non-partisan administration but was dismissed by the lieutenant governor in 1903 due to charges of conflict of interest that involved giving an important construction contract to his own hardware business, and did not run in the subsequent 1903 general election. He was defeated in 1904 in an attempt to return to the federal House of Commons.

Prior was appointed the 11th lieutenant governor of British Columbia in 1919 but became ill and died in office within a year of his appointment. Edward Gawler Prior is interred in the Ross Bay Cemetery in Victoria, British Columbia.

Prior was the last Canadian premier to be dismissed by a lieutenant-governor, (though William Aberhart, Premier of Alberta, was nearly so in 1937).

== Sources ==
- University of Victoria, BC History Edward Gawler Prior
