= Nancy Hodges =

Canadian politician (1888–1969)

The Honourable Nancy Hodges MLA
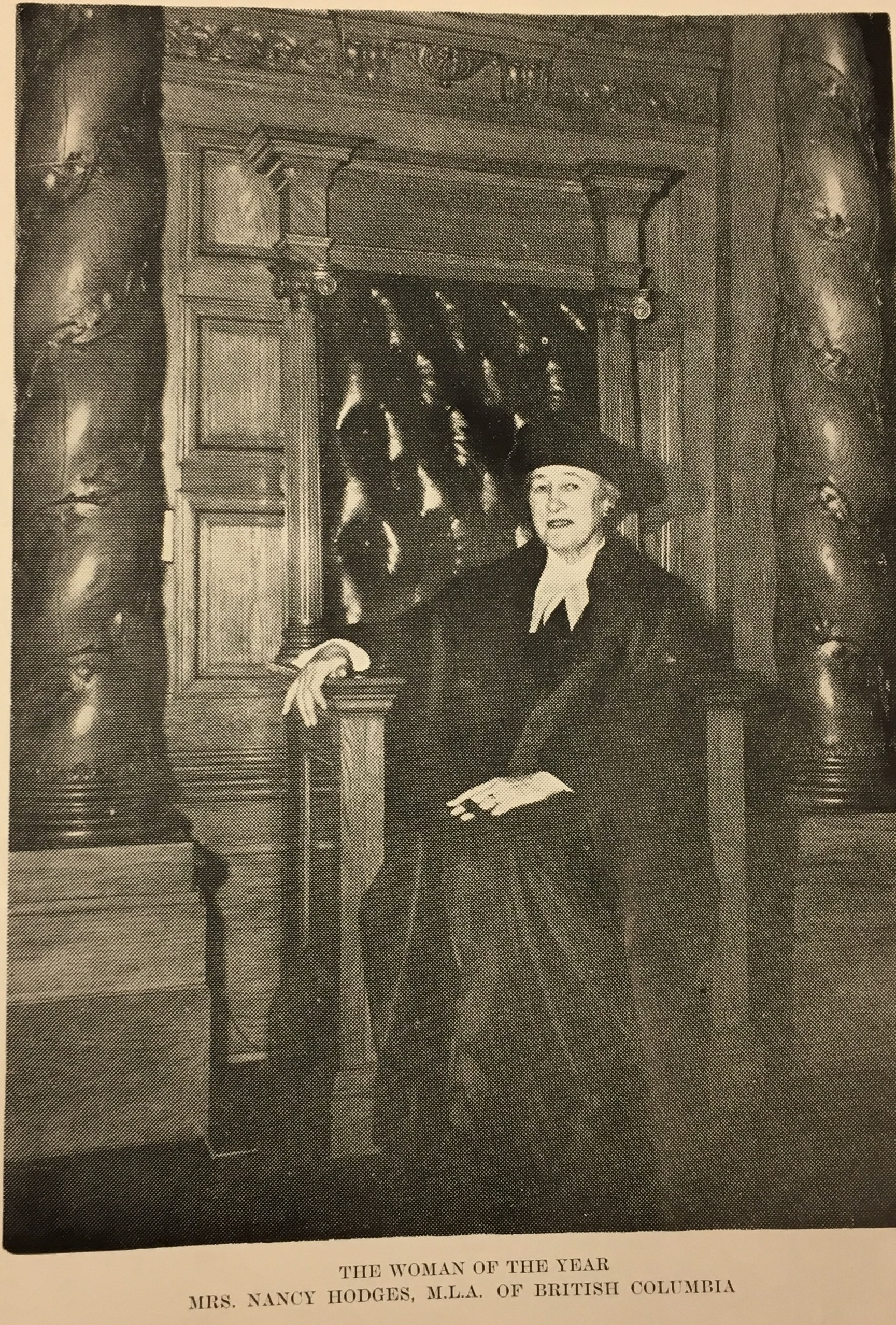

Canadian Senator from British Columbia
- In office November 5, 1953 – June 12, 1965
- Nominated by: Louis St. Laurent
- Appointed by: Vincent Massey

20th Speaker of the Legislative Assembly of British Columbia
- In office February 14, 1950 – April 10, 1952
- Preceded by: John Hart
- Succeeded by: Thomas Irwin

Member of the British Columbia Legislative Assembly for Victoria City
- In office October 21, 1941 – June 8, 1953 Serving with John Hart, Daniel John Proudfoot, William Thomas Straith
- Preceded by: Joseph Douglas Hunter
- Succeeded by: Lydia Arsens

Personal details
- Born: October 28, 1888 London, United Kingdom
- Died: December 15, 1969 (aged 81)
- Party: British Columbia Liberal Party (provincial); Liberal Party of Canada (federal)
- Spouse: Harry P. Hodges
- Profession: Journalist; politician

Nancy Hodges (October 28, 1888 – December 15, 1969) was a Canadian journalist and politician. Over her career, she served as a Member of the Legislative Assembly of British Columbia, as the Speaker of the Legislative Assembly of British Columbia, and as a member of the Senate of Canada. She was the first woman in the Commonwealth of Nations to become Speaker, and was known as a powerful women's rights activist in the Commonwealth.

== Background ==
Born in London, England, Nancy Hodges attended King's College at the London University. She and her husband, Harry P. Hodges, moved to Victoria, British Columbia, in 1916 due to him needing a dry climate for recovery for his tuberculosis. She then found a job as the women's editor for the Victoria Day Times, where she had a daily column. Through 30 years of being an esteemed journalist, she produced over 2,550 columns. Along with her passion for the paper, she was involved in the Victoria Business and Professional Women's Club, where she became a charter member, and later President. An unsuccessful candidate in the 1937 provincial election, she ran again in 1941 and succeeded, staying in office until 1953.

== Political career ==
Hodges first ran for office in the 1937 election in the multi-member riding of Victoria City, as a member of the Liberal Party. She was the first woman to run as a Liberal. She campaigned on increasing the quality of social conditions, resulting in better old-age pensions. Other ideas included bettering medical services and insurance, protection of single women, and compensation benefits for the working class. She came in seventh place and failed to be elected. She ran again in the 1941 election and was elected to the legislature. When the 1941 election produced only a plurality of seats for the governing Liberals, Hodges was one of the MLAs who supported forming a coalition with the Conservatives; when Liberal premier and leader Duff Pattullo argued that "coalition with the Conservatives will be the end of the Liberal Party in British Columbia.", Hodges responded "Coalition won't kill any party that hasn't germs of decay in it already." The coalitionists ultimately won out, and Pattullo was replaced as premier by John Hart.

Hodges took interest in the Victoria Business and Professional Women's Club, where her slogan was born: "Equal pay for equal work!" She had a strong belief that more women should be entering into politics to make a positive change. Hodges' principles occasionally led her to work across party lines with the other women in the legislature (Tilly Rolston, Conservative; Dorothy Steeves, Laura Jamieson, Grace MacInnis, CCF) to promote women's issues; in one instance, Hodges and the other women convinced the government to buy seven Emily Carr paintings before she was nationally renowned, making the purchase a bargain upon Carr's recognition.

Hodges was re-elected in 1945 and 1949. She attended a public meeting conference for the United Nations in 1945 for International Peace in San Francisco. In this meeting, the Charter of the United Nations was first signed. In 1947, she attacked the Coalition government for laying off single women to provide jobs for returning veterans, and threatened to campaign for pensions for women at 40 if the practice continued. The firing of women stopped. During this time, Hodges advocated for women to be eligible for worker's compensation benefits, and for married women to receive property rights.

When John Hart stepped down in 1947, Hodges supported Boss Johnson as his successor, nominating him in a passionate speech at the convention; Johnson won by eight votes. Following his victory, there was speculation among the press that Hodges would receive a cabinet post as a reward, but Hodges quashed rumours, and said she would not accept a cabinet post. In 1950, she was elected as Speaker of the Legislative Assembly, becoming the first woman in the Commonwealth of Nations to hold that office. During her time as Speaker, Hodges toured North America, including visits to The Californian Business and Professional Women's Club, The Canadian Federation of Liberal Women, and The Women's Canadian Club in Ottawa. In July 1950, Hodges was invited to The Halifax Convention of the Federation of Canadian Business and Professional Women's Clubs where she was named Canadian Woman of 1950.

Hodges was defeated in the 1953 election by the Social Credit candidate, Lydia Arsens. Shortly after, in 1953, she was appointed to the Senate of Canada representing the senatorial division of Victoria, British Columbia, and served until her resignation in 1965. Increase in salary for underpaid government workers, teachers, and mothers were among the causes she took up as a senator. She later became the President of the National Association of Liberal Women. During her time as a senator, Hodges was a member of numerous committees, including the Standing Committee on Immigration and Labour, the Standing Committee on Internal Economy and Contingent Accounts, and the Standing Committee on Divorce. Along with being a member of Senate committees, she was also a member of various Joint Committees including those of Restaurant and Parliament, and Capital and Corporal Punishment and Lotteries.
