= Boss Johnson =

Canadian politician (1890–1964)

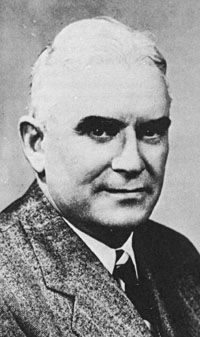
- Byron I. Johnson

24th Premier of British Columbia
- In office December 29, 1947 – August 1, 1952
- Monarchs: George VI; Elizabeth II
- Lieutenant Governor: Charles Arthur Banks; Clarence Wallace
- Preceded by: John Hart
- Succeeded by: W. A. C. Bennett

MLA for Victoria City
- In office November 2, 1933 – June 1, 1937 Serving with Herbert Anscomb, Robert Connell, John Hart
- Preceded by: James Harry Beatty; Reginald Hayward; Joshua Hinchcliffe; Harold Despard Twigg
- Succeeded by: Joseph Douglas Hunter

MLA for New Westminster
- In office May 10, 1945 – June 12, 1952
- Preceded by: Arthur Wellesley Gray
- Succeeded by: Rae Eddie

Personal details
- Born: Björn Ingimar Jónsson; December 10, 1890 Victoria, British Columbia
- Died: January 12, 1964 (aged 73) Victoria, British Columbia
- Party: British Columbia Liberal Party
- Spouse: Kate Johnson
- Nickname: Bjössi

Byron Ingemar "Boss" Johnson (born Björn Ingimar Jónsson; December 10, 1890 – January 12, 1964), served as the 24th premier of British Columbia, from 1947 to 1952. To his contemporaries he was often referred to by his nickname, Boss Johnson, which had nothing to do with his personality, but was an anglicization of the Icelandic "Bjossi", which is a diminutive form of his birth-name of Bjorn, which was adapted into English as Byron.

== Early years ==
Johnson was born and raised in Victoria, British Columbia. After overseas service in World War I, he and his brothers opened a building supplies business in Victoria, which proved to be successful. Johnson was first elected as one of four members of the Legislative Assembly from Victoria City to the BC Legislature as a Liberal in the 1933 election. He served four years in the caucus of Premier Duff Pattullo before being defeated in the 1937 election.

Johnson returned to his business and in World War II was put in charge of constructing Royal Canadian Air Force facilities throughout the province. In a 1945 provincial byelection, he returned to the legislature, this time as the member for New Westminster. Following John Hart's resignation in 1947, Johnson succeeded him as Liberal leader and as the leader of the Coalition, and therefore also as Premier – becoming the first Premier of British Columbia born after confederation in the province.

== Johnson as Premier ==
Johnson's government introduced compulsory health insurance, and a 3% provincial sales tax to pay for it. It expanded the highway system, extended the Pacific Great Eastern Railway, and negotiated the Alcan Agreement, which facilitated construction of the Kenney Dam, the first major hydroelectric project in the province. The government also coped with the devastating 1948 flooding of the Fraser River, declaring a state of emergency and beginning a programme of diking the river's banks through the Fraser Valley. Johnson is also noted for appointing Nancy Hodges as the second female Speaker in the British Commonwealth, Mary Ellen Smith being the first. It was also during Johnson's tenure that the British Columbia Provincial Police were disbanded and replaced by the R.C.M.P.

The Liberal-Conservative Coalition government, with the Liberals led by Johnson and the Conservatives led by Herbert Anscomb, won a landslide victory in the 1949 election—at 61% the greatest percentage of the popular vote in BC history. Although Maitland's caucus was crucial to the government's parliamentary mandate, the larger Liberal caucus earned Johnson the Premier's job. After the Conservatives withdrew from the coalition in 1952, Johnson's government collapsed. In the subsequent 1952 election, the Liberals were defeated by W.A.C. Bennett's Social Credit Party, and Johnson lost his own seat to Rae Eddie of the Cooperative Commonwealth Federation. With the defeat, a new era of a two-party system (CCF/New Democratic Party of Canada versus Social Credit) emerged.

Johnson returned to private life, and died in Victoria in 1964, aged 73 years. He is interred in the city's Ross Bay Cemetery.

== Lacrosse goaltender ==
Boss Johnson played parts of three seasons of professional lacrosse as a goalkeeper for the Vancouver Lacrosse Club. Prior to his pro career, he played lacrosse for various teams at the scholastic level; he then turned senior with Victoria Capitals in the Pacific Coast Amateur Lacrosse Association before then making the jump to the professional ranks in 1913.

He signed with the Vancouver Lacrosse Club late in the 1913 season as a replacement for future hall-of-famer Cory Hess. He then signed with the Vancouver Athletic Club when they joined as a replacement for the defunct Vancouver Lacrosse Club in 1914 – playing in all 6 of VAC's matches. But during the 1915 season, back again with the revived Vancouver Lacrosse Club, he found himself replaced in late June 1915 by Dave Gibbons. Johnson's final game for Vancouver, on June 26, 1915, ended on a sour note as he was ejected from the game during the second quarter with 50 minutes accumulated in penalties.

Season	Team	League	Games	Goals	Assists	Points	Penalties	Penalty Minutes	Wins	Losses	Ties	Goals Against	Goals Against Average	Winning Percentage
1913	Vancouver Lacrosse Club	BCLA	2	0	-	0	1	5	1	1	0	8	4.00	.500
1914	Vancouver Athletic Club	BCLA	6	0	-	0	0	0	3	3	0	36	6.00	.500
1915	Vancouver Lacrosse Club	BCLA	5	0	-	0	2	55	1	4	0	53	10.60	.200
