= Theodore Davie =

Canadian politician (1852-1898)

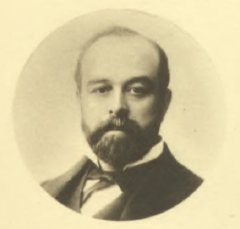
- The Hon. Theodore Davie

10th Premier of British Columbia
- In office July 2, 1892 – March 2, 1895
- Monarch: Victoria
- Lieutenant Governor: Hugh Nelson; Edgar Dewdney
- Preceded by: John Robson
- Succeeded by: John Herbert Turner

MLA for Victoria City
- In office July 24, 1882 – June 13, 1890 Serving with Robert Beaven, Simeon Duck, Montague William Tyrwhitt-Drake, Edward Gawler Prior, John Herbert Turner
- Preceded by: James Smith Drummond
- Succeeded by: John Grant

MLA for Cowichan
- In office June 13, 1890 – July 7, 1894 Serving with Henry Croft
- Preceded by: William Smithe
- Succeeded by: district abolished

MLA for Cowichan-Alberni
- In office July 7, 1894 – February 23, 1895 Serving with James Mitchell Mutter
- Preceded by: first member
- Succeeded by: Thomas Anthony Wood

Personal details
- Born: March 22, 1852 Brixton, England
- Died: March 7, 1898 (aged 45) Victoria, British Columbia
- Party: None
- Spouses: Blanche Baker (m. 1874) Mary Alice Yorke (m. 1884)

Theodore Davie (March 22, 1852 in Brixton, London – March 7, 1898 in Victoria, British Columbia) was a British Columbia lawyer, politician, and jurist. He practised law in Cassiar and Nanaimo before settling in Victoria and becoming a leading criminal lawyer. He was the brother of Alexander Edmund Batson Davie, who served as premier of British Columbia from 1887 to 1889. Theodore Davie was first elected to the provincial legislature in 1882. In 1889, he became attorney-general under Premier John Robson, and succeeded Robson as premier in 1892.

Davie's government passed a Redistribution Bill to give the mainland of the province greater representation in the legislature. His government also provided financial incentives to the railways in an effort to stimulate the economy. The Davie government also approved the construction of the province's parliament buildings in Victoria despite pressure to move the capital to the mainland.

Davie served as premier until 1895 when he resigned to become Chief Justice of the Supreme Court of British Columbia succeeding the province's first Chief Justice, Sir Matthew Baillie Begbie.

== 1877 Attempt to settle the Alaska boundary dispute ==
Theodore Davie is interred in the Ross Bay Cemetery in Victoria, British Columbia.
