= William Chant =

Canadian politician (1895–1976)

William N. Chant
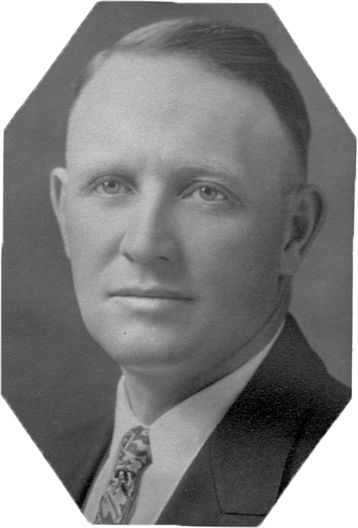

Member of the Legislative Assembly of British Columbia for Victoria Victoria City (1953-1966)
- In office June 9, 1953 – August 30, 1972 Serving with Lydia Arsens and Walter Wright (1953-1956); George Gregory (1956-1960); John Donald Smith (1956-1966); Waldo Skillings (1960-1972)
- Preceded by: Daniel John Proudfoot
- Succeeded by: David Anderson; Newell Morrison

Member of the Legislative Assembly of Alberta for Camrose
- In office August 22, 1935 – March 21, 1940
- Preceded by: Chester Ronning
- Succeeded by: David B. Mullen

Personal details
- Born: July 13, 1895 Brampton, Ontario
- Died: September 25, 1976 (aged 81) Chilliwack, British Columbia
- Party: Social Credit; Independent Progressive

William Neelands Chant (July 13, 1895 – September 25, 1976) was a farmer and political figure in Alberta and British Columbia. He represented Camrose in the Legislative Assembly of Alberta from 1935 to 1940 as a Social Credit and then Independent member and Victoria City in the Legislative Assembly of British Columbia from 1953 to 1972 as a Social Credit member.

He was born in Brampton, Ontario, the son of John Daniel Chant and Mary Abigail Neelands, and was educated there. In 1921, he married Ella Victoria Langbell. Chant was a member of the municipal council and a school trustee for Camrose, Alberta. He served during World War I. Chant was Minister of Agriculture in the Alberta cabinet but resigned from his cabinet post in the Social Credit backbenchers' revolt of 1937. He was defeated when he ran for re-election to the Alberta assembly as an Independent Progressive Party candidate in 1944. Chant ran unsuccessfully for a seat in the British Columbia assembly in 1952 before being elected in 1953; he served as Minister of Public Works in the British Columbia cabinet.
