= John Oliver (British Columbia politician) =

Canadian politician

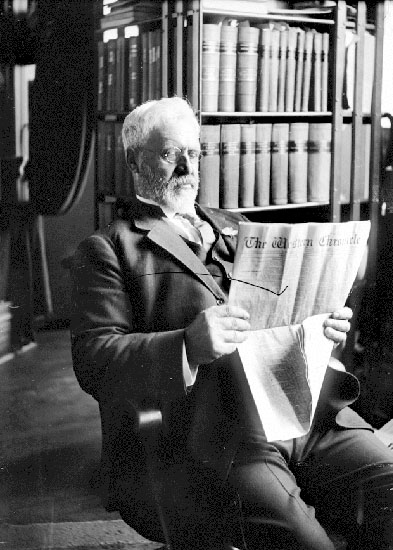

19th Premier of British Columbia
- In office March 6, 1918 – August 17, 1927
- Monarch: George V
- Lieutenant Governor: Francis Stillman Barnard; Edward Gawler Prior; Walter Cameron Nichol; Robert Randolph Bruce
- Preceded by: Harlan Carey Brewster
- Succeeded by: John Duncan MacLean

Member of the British Columbia Legislative Assembly for Westminster-Delta
- In office June 9, 1900 – October 3, 1903
- Preceded by: William Thomas Forster
- Succeeded by: district abolished

Member of the British Columbia Legislative Assembly for Delta
- In office October 3, 1903 – November 25, 1909
- Preceded by: first member
- Succeeded by: Francis James Anderson MacKenzie

Member of the British Columbia Legislative Assembly for Dewdney
- In office September 14, 1916 – December 1, 1920
- Preceded by: William J. Manson
- Succeeded by: John Alexander Catherwood

Member of the British Columbia Legislative Assembly for Victoria City
- In office December 1, 1920 – June 20, 1924 Serving with Joseph Clearihue, John Hart, Joshua Hinchcliffe
- Preceded by: George Bell; Harlan Carey Brewster; Henry Charles Hall; John Hart
- Succeeded by: Reginald Hayward

Member of the British Columbia Legislative Assembly for Nelson
- In office August 23, 1924 – August 17, 1927
- Preceded by: Kenneth Campbell
- Succeeded by: James Albert McDonald

Personal details
- Born: July 31, 1856 Hartington, Derbyshire, England
- Died: August 17, 1927 (aged 71) Victoria, British Columbia, Canada
- Party: BC Liberal
- Spouse: Elizabeth Woodward (m. 1886).

John Oliver (July 31, 1856 – August 17, 1927) was a British-Canadian politician and farmer, who served as the 19th premier of British Columbia. As a prominent figure in the province’s early political landscape, Oliver served in various capacities, including as leader of the Opposition and minister of Agriculture, and contributed significantly to the development of British Columbia’s agricultural and railway sectors.

A member of the former British Columbia Liberal Party, Oliver was first elected to the provincial legislature in the 1900 provincial election. After serving as the leader of the Opposition, he lost his seat in 1909 but returned the legislature in the 1916 election. That year, he was appointed minister of Agriculture and minister of Railways in premier Harlan Carey Brewster's cabinet. Following Brewster's death in 1918, Oliver succeeded him as premier.

In addition to his role as premier, Oliver held the portfolios of minister of Agriculture (1918), minister of Railways (1918–1922), and minister of industry (1919–1922). Under his leadership, his administration prioritized agricultural development, notably in the Okanagan Valley, which became a hub for the province's produce industry. Oliver's government also advocated for reduced rail freight rates to improve the economic viability of British Columbia’s agricultural exports.

A notable moment in Oliver's tenure was the 1923 visit of U.S. president Warren G. Harding to Vancouver, marking the first visit of a sitting U.S. president to Canada.

Oliver served as premier until his death in 1927. His legacy endures through numerous places named in his honor, including John Oliver Secondary School in Vancouver, John Oliver Park in Delta, Mount John Oliver in the Cariboo Mountains' Premier Range, the town of Oliver, British Columbia, and Oliver Street in Williams Lake, British Columbia.

== Electoral history ==
1900 British Columbia general election: Westminster-Delta
Party	Candidate	Votes	%	Elected
Government	John Oliver	324	45.51	✓
Conservative	John Walter Berry	215	30.20	
Progressive	Thomas William Forster	173	24.30	
Total valid votes		712	100.00	

10th British Columbia election, 1903
Party	Candidate	Votes	%	±	Expenditures
Conservative	William Henry Ladner	309	40.87%		unknown
Liberal	John Oliver	447	59.13%		unknown
Total valid votes		756	100.00%		
Total rejected ballots					
Turnout		%			

11th British Columbia election, 1907
Party	Candidate	Votes	%	±	Expenditures
Conservative	Francis James Anderson MacKenzie	261	37.77%		unknown
Liberal	John Oliver	430	62.23%		unknown
Total valid votes		691	100.00%		
Total rejected ballots					
Turnout		%			

12th British Columbia election, 1909
Party	Candidate	Votes	%	±	Expenditures
Conservative	Francis James Anderson MacKenzie	765	58.13%		unknown
Liberal	John Oliver	551	41.87%		unknown
Total valid votes		1,316	100.00%		
Total rejected ballots					
Turnout		%			
^{1} Results of recount as reported in New Westminster Columbian 29 November 1909, p. 1

13th British Columbia election, 1912
Party	Candidate	Votes	%	±	Expenditures
Conservative	Francis James Anderson MacKenzie	748	70.83%		unknown
Liberal	John Oliver	308	29.17%		unknown
Total valid votes		1,056	100.00%		
Total rejected ballots					
Turnout		%			

1920 British Columbia general election: Delta
Party	Candidate	Votes	%
Liberal	John Oliver	1,334	37.50
Soldier–Farmer	Richmond Archie Payne	1,107	31.12
Conservative	Francis James Anderson MacKenzie	964	21.55
Total valid votes		3,557	100.00
