= James Trimble (Canadian politician) =

Canadian politician

1st Speaker of the Legislative Assembly of British Columbia
- In office November 20, 1871 – April 12, 1878
- Preceded by: first holder
- Succeeded by: Frederick W. Williams

Member of the Legislative Assembly of British Columbia for Victoria City
- In office October 16, 1871 – May 22, 1878 Serving with Robert Beaven, Simeon Duck (1871–1875), John Foster McCreight (1871–1875), James W. Douglas (1875–1878), and Andrew Charles Elliott (1875–1878)
- Preceded by: first holder
- Succeeded by: James Smith Drummond, John William Williams, and William Wilson

Member of the Legislative Assembly of Vancouver Island for Victoria District
- In office November 26, 1860 – August 31, 1866 Serving with 6 other members
- Preceded by: Alfred Pendrell Waddington
- Succeeded by: assembly abolished

James Trimble (c. 1817 – January 1, 1885) was an Irish-born medical doctor and political figure in British Columbia, Canada. He represented Victoria City in the Legislative Assembly of British Columbia from 1871 to 1878.

He was born in County Tyrone. Trimble was a surgeon in the British Army until 1849 when he went to California. He arrived in Victoria, British Columbia, in 1858 and served as medical supervisor for the Royal Hospital there. He served in the Legislative Assembly of Vancouver Island. Trimble was the first speaker of the Legislative Assembly of British Columbia, serving from 1872 to 1878. He was mayor of Victoria from 1868 to 1870.
