= Victoria City (provincial electoral district) =

Defunct provincial electoral district in British Columbia, Canada

British Columbia electoral district

Defunct provincial electoral district
- Legislature: Legislative Assembly of British Columbia
- First contested: 1871
- Last contested: 1963

Demographics
- Census subdivision: Victoria

Victoria City was one of the first twelve provincial electoral districts in the province of British Columbia, Canada, upon its entry into Confederation in 1871. It was originally a four-member riding, but starting in 1941 it elected only three.

It elected to the Legislature several prominent members of the Legislative Assembly (MLAs) and premiers. It last appeared on the hustings in the 1963 election.

The members for Victoria were elected through plurality block voting except for the 1952 and 1953 elections when First-past-the-post voting was used to elect each member through a separate contest.

== Electoral history ==
Note: Winners in each election are in bold.

1st British Columbia election, 1871
Party	Candidate	Votes	%	±	Expenditures
**Independent**	**Robert Beaven**	**301**	**19.87%**		unknown
**Independent**	**Simeon Duck**	**301**	**19.87%**		unknown
**Independent**	**John Foster McCreight**^{1}	**373**	**24.62%**		unknown
**Independent**	**James Trimble**	**321**	**21.19%**		unknown
Independent	Robert Taylor Williams	124	8.18%		unknown
Total valid votes		1,515	100.00%		
Total rejected ballots					
Turnout		%			
^{1} First Premier of British Columbia.

British Columbia Byelection: Victoria City January 11, 1873^{2}
Party	Candidate	Votes	%	±	Expenditures
**Independent**	**Robert Beaven**	**Acclaimed**	-.- %		unknown
Total valid votes		n/a	-.- %		
Total rejected ballots					
Turnout		%			
² The byelection was called due to Beaven's resignation upon appointment to the Executive Council (cabinet) on December 23, 1872. This byelection was one of a series held to confirm appointments to the Executive Council, which was the old parliamentary convention. As this byelection writ was filled by acclamation, no polling day was required and the seat was filled within two weeks. The stated date is the date the return of writs was received by the Chief Electoral Officer.

1875 British Columbia general election
Party	Candidate	Votes	%	Elected
Government	Robert Beaven	428	19.10	✓
Independent Government	James Trimble	405	18.07	✓
Opposition	Andrew Charles Elliott³	383	17.09	✓
Independent Reform	Thomas Harris	383	17.09	
Unknown	James W. Douglas	382	17.05	✓
Government	Simeon Duck	319	14.23	
Government	Gideon C. Gerow	67	2.99	
Independent	Robert Taylor Williams	24	1.07	
Total valid votes		2,241	100.00	
³ Fourth Premier of British Columbia.

British Columbia Byelection: Victoria City February 22, 1876^{4}
Party	Candidate	Votes	%	±	Expenditures
Opposition	Simeon Duck	282	38.79%	–	unknown
Government	**Andrew Charles Elliott**	**445**	**61.21%**	–	unknown
Total valid votes		727	100.00%		
Total rejected ballots					
Turnout		%			
^{4} The byelection was called following Elliott's resignation upon appointment to the Executive Council (cabinet) on February 1, 1876.

3rd British Columbia election, 1878
Party	Candidate	Votes	%	±	Expenditures
Opposition	**Robert Beaven**	**417**	**16.53%**	–	unknown
Opposition	Joseph Westrop Carey	22	0.87%	–	unknown
Opposition	**James Smith Drummond**	**380**	**15.06%**	–	unknown
Government	Andrew Charles Elliott	338	13.40%	–	unknown
Opposition	Roderick Finlayson	318	12.60%	–	unknown
Government	James Trimble	301	11.93%	–	unknown
Opposition	**John William Williams**	**318**	**12.60%**	–	unknown
Opposition	**William Wilson**	**396**	**15.70%**	–	unknown
Total valid votes		2,523	100.00%		
Total rejected ballots					
Turnout		%			

British Columbia Byelection: Victoria City July 10, 1878^{5}
Party	Candidate	Votes	%	±	Expenditures
**Independent**	**Robert Beaven**	**Acclaimed**	-.- %		unknown
Total valid votes		n/a	-.- %		
Total rejected ballots					
Turnout		%			
^{5} The byelection was called due to Beaven's resignation upon his appointment to Executive Council June 26, 1878 This byelection was one of a series held to confirm appointments to the Executive Council, which was the old parliamentary convention. As this byelection writ was filled by acclamation, no polling day was required and the seat was filled within two weeks. The stated date is the date the return of writs was received by the Chief Electoral Officer.

4th British Columbia election, 1882
Party	Candidate	Votes	%	±	Expenditures
Government	**Robert Beaven**^{6}	**459**	**16.33%**	–	unknown
Opposition	Theodore Davie	22	0.87%	–	unknown
Government	**James Smith Drummond**	**105**	**3.74%**	–	unknown
Independent	Simeon Duck	368	13.09%		unknown
Opposition	James Trimble	280	9.96%	–	unknown
Opposition	**Montague William Tyrwhitt-Drake**	**361**	**12.84%**	–	unknown
Government	**John William Williams**	**237**	**8.43%**	–	unknown
Government	Wilson Alexander	321	11.42%	–	unknown
Opposition	William Wilson	281	10.00%	–	unknown
Total valid votes		2,811	100.00%		
Total rejected ballots					
Turnout		%			
^{6} Sixth Premier of British Columbia.

British Columbia Byelection: Victoria City April 15, 1885^{7}
Party	Candidate	Votes	%	±	Expenditures
Government	**Simeon Duck**	**281**	**50.63%**	–	unknown
Opposition	Robert Taylor Williams	274	49.37%	–	unknown
Total valid votes		555	100.00%		
Total rejected ballots					
Turnout		%			
^{7} The byelection was called due to the resignation of Simeon Duck upon his appointment to the Executive Council March 21, 1885.

5th British Columbia election, 1886
Party	Candidate	Votes	%	±	Expenditures
Opposition	**Robert Beaven**	**540**	**13.65%**	–	unknown
Independent (?)	Joseph Westrop Carey	543	1.34%		unknown
Government	**Theodore Davie**^{8}	**463**	**11.71%**	–	unknown
Government	Simeon Duck	456	11.53%	–	unknown
Labour	John Mayfield Duval	127	3.21%		unknown
Opposition	Robert Lipsett	362	9.15%	–	unknown
Government	**Edward Gawlor Prior**^{9}	**540**	**13.65%**	–	unknown
Labour	Andrew Johnston Smith	208	5.26%		unknown
Government	**John Herbert Turner**	**472**	**11.93%**	–	unknown
Opposition	Robert Taylor Williams	413	10.44%	–	unknown
Opposition	Joseph Wriglesworth	312	8.12%	–	
Total valid votes		3,955	100.00%		
Total rejected ballots					
Turnout		%			
^{8} Premier of British Columbia.
^{9} Later the fifteenth Premier of British Columbia.

6th British Columbia election, 1890
Party	Candidate	Votes	%	±	Expenditures
Opposition	**Robert Beaven**	**997**	**13.89%**	–	unknown
Government	William Dalby	528	7.35%	–	unknown
Government	Simeon Duck	658	9.17%	–	unknown
Opposition	**John Grant**	**1,226**	**17.08%**	–	unknown
Government	John Irving	747	10.41%	–	unknown
Opposition	**George Lawson Milne**	**901**	**12.55%**	–	unknown
Opposition	Francis Gilbert Richards Jr.	702	9.76%	–	unknown
Government	**John Herbert Turner**	**851**	**11.85%**	–	unknown
Independent	Charles Wilson	570	7.94%		unknown
Total valid votes		7,179	100.00%		
Total rejected ballots					
Turnout		%			

7th British Columbia election, 1894
Party	Candidate	Votes	%	±	Expenditures
Opposition	Robert Beaven	793	6.47%	–	unknown
Government	**John Braden**	**2,160**	**17.62%**	–	unknown
Opposition	William George Cameron	664	5.42%	–	unknown
Opposition	Arthur Howard Dutton	661	5.39%	–	unknown
Government	**Henry Dallas Helmcken**	**2,286**	**18.65%**	–	unknown
Opposition	George Lawson Milne	828	6.76%	–	unknown
Government	**Robert Paterson Rithet**	**2,504**	**20.43%**	–	unknown
Government	**John Herbert Turner**^{10}	**2,361**	**19.26%**	–	unknown
Total valid votes		12,257	100.00%		
Total rejected ballots					
Turnout		%			
^{10} Eleventh Premier of British Columbia.

8th British Columbia election, 1898
Party	Candidate	Votes	%	±	Expenditures
Independent	Robert Beaven	906	9.63%		unknown
Opposition	Arthur Louis Belyea	949	10.09%	–	unknown
Opposition	Francis Brooke Gregory	1,149	12.21%	–	unknown
Government	**Richard Hall**	**1,274**	**13.54%**	–	unknown
Government	**Henry Dallas Helmcken**	**1,484**	**15.77%**	–	unknown
Government	**Albert Edward McPhillips**	**1,229**	**13.06%**	–	unknown
Opposition	Alexander Stewart	1,065	11.32%	–	unknown
Government	**John Herbert Turner**	**1,352**	**14.37%**	–	unknown
Total valid votes		9,408	100.00%		
Total rejected ballots					
Turnout		%			

9th British Columbia election, 1900
Party	Candidate	Votes	%	±	Expenditures
Government	John Leander Beckwith	1,154	10.25%	–	unknown
Government	John Graham Brown	1,259	11.18%	–	unknown
Opposition	**Richard Hall**	**1,597**	**14.18%**	–	unknown
Opposition	**Henry Dallas Helmcken**	**1,668**	**14.80%**	–	unknown
Government	Joseph Martin^{11}	1,352	12.00%	–	unknown
Opposition	**Albert Edward McPhillips**	**1,552**	**13.78%**	–	unknown
Opposition	**John Herbert Turner**	**540**	**13.65%**	–	unknown
Labour	James Stuart Yates	1,233	10.95%		unknown
Total valid votes		11,264	100.00%		
Total rejected ballots					
Turnout		%			
^{11} Thirteenth Premier of British Columbia.

In 1902, premier Edward Gawler Prior won a seat in a by-election.

10th British Columbia election, 1903
Party	Candidate	Votes	%	±	Expenditures
**Liberal**	**William George Cameron**	**1,860**	**14.54%**		unknown
**Liberal**	**Richard Low Drury**	**1,744**	**13.63%**		unknown
**Liberal**	**Richard Hall**	**1,554**	**12.14%**		unknown
Conservative	Charles Hayward	1,396	10.91%		unknown
Conservative	Henry Dallas Helmcken	1,342	10.49%		unknown
Conservative	Joseph Hunter	1,223	9.56%		unknown
**Liberal**	**James Dugald McNiven**	**1,627**	**12.71%**		unknown
Conservative	Albert Edward McPhillips	1,352	10.57%		unknown
Socialist	James Cameron Watters	697	5.45%	–	unknown
Total valid votes		12,795	100.00%		
Total rejected ballots					
Turnout		%			

11th British Columbia election, 1907
Party	Candidate	Votes	%	±	Expenditures
**Conservative**	**Henry Frederick William Behnsen**	**1,477**	**11.77%**		unknown
Liberal	William George Cameron	1,164	9.28%		unknown
**Conservative**	**Frederick Davey**	**1,497**	**11.93%**		unknown
Liberal	Richard Low Drury	1,192	9.50%		unknown
Canadian Labour Party of BC	Ernest Amos Hall	863	6.88%		unknown
Liberal	Richard Hall	1,089	8.68%		unknown
Canadian Labour Party of BC	Arngrimur Johnson	437	3.47%		unknown
Canadian Labour Party of BC	William Herbert Marcon	366	2.92%		unknown
**Conservative**	**Richard McBride^{12}**	**1,614**	**12.86%**		unknown
Liberal	James Dugald McNiven	1,029	8.20%		unknown
**Conservative**	**Henry Broughton Thomson**	**1,377**	**10.97%**		unknown
Socialist	James Cameron Watters	443	3.53%	–	unknown
Total valid votes		12,548	100.00%		
Total rejected ballots					
Turnout		%			
^{12} Sixteenth Premier of British Columbia.

12th British Columbia election, 1909
Party	Candidate	Votes	%	±	Expenditures
**Conservative**	**Henry Frederick William Behnsen**	**2,497**	**12.92%**		unknown
**Conservative**	**Frederick Davey**	**2,053**	**12.96%**		unknown
Liberal	Richard Low Drury	2,031	10.51%		unknown
Liberal	William Kyle Houston	1,875	9.71%		unknown
**Conservative**	**Richard McBride**	**2,846**	**14.78%**		unknown
Independent	Alfred James Morley ^{13}	2,218	11.48%		unknown
Socialist	George Oliver	659	3.41%	–	unknown
Liberal	John Oliver^{14}	2,216	11.47%		unknown
**Conservative**	**Henry Broughton Thomson**	**2,465**	**12.76%**		unknown
Total valid votes		19,320	100.00%		
Total rejected ballots					
Turnout		%			
^{13} Endorsed by Liberals.
^{14} Later 19th Premier of BC 1918-1927.

13th British Columbia election, 1912
Party	Candidate	Votes	%	±	Expenditures
**Conservative**	**Henry Frederick William Behnsen**	**2,392**	**14.92%**		unknown
Liberal	Harlan Carey Brewster	2,049	12.78%		unknown
**Conservative**	**Frederick Davey**	**2,471**	**15.41%**		unknown
Liberal	Richard Thomas Elliott	1,979	12.34%		unknown
**Conservative**	**Richard McBride**	**3,223**	**20.10%**		unknown
Socialist	Victor Rainsford Midgley^{15}	2,218	11.48%	–	unknown
Independent	Bernard Joseph Perry	616	3.84%		unknown
**Conservative**	**Henry Broughton Thomson**	**2,641**	**16.47%**		unknown
Total valid votes		16,034	100.00%		
Total rejected ballots					
Turnout		%			
^{15} Endorsed by Social Democratic Party of BC

14th British Columbia election, 1916
Party	Candidate	Votes	%	±	Expenditures
**Liberal**	**George Bell**	**3,963**	**12.89%**		unknown
**Liberal**	**Harlan Carey Brewster**	**4,988**	**16.22%**		unknown
Conservative	John Dilworth	2,651	8.62%		unknown
Independent Liberal	Ernest Amos Hall	1,518	4.94%		unknown
**Liberal**	**Henry Charles Hall**	**3,161**	**10.28%**		unknown
**Liberal**	**John Hart**	**3,660**	**11.90%**		unknown
Conservative	Reginald Hayward	2,793	9.08%		unknown
Independent	Alfred James Morley	1,185	3.85%		unknown
Social Democratic	Daniel William Poupard	454	1.48%		
Social Democratic	Philip Robert Smith	475	1.54%		
Conservative	Alexander Stewart	3,129	10.18%		unknown
Conservative	Leonard Tait	2,774	9.02%		unknown
Total valid votes		30,751	100.00%		
Total rejected ballots					
Turnout		%			

1920 British Columbia general election
Party	Candidate	Votes	%	Elected
Liberal	John Oliver ^{18}	6,498	12.05	✓
Conservative	Joshua Hinchcliffe	5,305	9.84	✓
Liberal	John Hart	5,016	9.30	✓
Liberal	Joseph Badenoch Clearihue	4,551	8.44	✓
Conservative	Alexander Stewart	4,170	7.73	
Conservative	William Walter Northcott	4,141	7.68	
Social Democrat	Roderick Ross Sutherland	4,072	7.55	
Independent	Ernest Amos Hall	4,010	7.43	
Liberal	Henry Charles Hall	3,868	7.17	
Independent Liberal	George Bell	2,045	3.79	
Soldier–Labour	Cecil Keir Christian ^{16}	1,716	3.18	
Soldier–Labour	James Dakers ^{16}	1,318	2.44	
Soldier–Labour	Robert Paton McLernan	1,202	2.33	
Federated Labour	William Edouard Peirce	834	1.55	
Soldier–Labour	Francis William Henry Giolma ^{17}	778	1.44	
Independent	Herbert Wynn Davies	475	0.88	
Total valid votes		53,936	100.00	
^{16} Nominated by GAUV for joint Soldier-Labour ticket.
^{17} Nominated by Victoria Trades and Labour Council for joint Soldier-Labour ticket.
^{18} Premier of BC since 1918

16th British Columbia election, 1924
Party	Candidate	Votes	%	±	Expenditures
Liberal	Joseph Badenoch Clearihue	3,498	6.77%		unknown
Liberal	Samuel James Drake	3,527	6.83%		unknown
Canadian Labour Party	Mary Gertrude Graves	1,056	2.04%		unknown
Canadian Labour Party	James Hurst Hawthornthwaite	821	1.59%		unknown
**Conservative**	**Reginald Hayward**	**6,127**	**11.86%**		unknown
**Conservative**	**Joshua Hinchcliffe**	**6,118**	**11.84%**		unknown
**Conservative**	**Robert Allan Gus Lyons**	**5,120**	**9.91%**		unknown
Independent	Christopher Roland North	1,715	3.32%		unknown
Liberal	John Oliver	4,032	7.80%		unknown
Canadian Labour Party	William Edouard Peirce	763	1.48%		unknown
Liberal	Melbourne Raynor	4,138	8.01%		unknown
Provincial	Alexander Gordon Smith	2,175	4.21%	–	unknown
Provincial	Albert Edward Todd	2,379	4.60%	–	unknown
**Conservative**	**Harold Despard Twigg**	**5,710**	**11.05%**		unknown
Provincial	Eugene Sidney Woodward	2,477	4.79%	–	unknown
Provincial	Andrew Wright	2,019	3.91%	–	unknown
Total valid votes		51,675	100.00%		
Total rejected ballots					
Turnout		%			

17th British Columbia election, 1928
Party	Candidate	Votes	%	±	Expenditures
**Conservative**	**James Harry Beatty**	**7,505**	**13.06%**		unknown
Liberal	Robert Alexander C. Dewar	6,180	10.76%		unknown
Liberal	Mark Willson Graham	6,025	10.49%		unknown
**Conservative**	**Reginald Hayward**	**7,754**	**13.50%**		unknown
**Conservative**	**Joshua Hinchcliffe**	**7,614**	**13.25%**		unknown
Independent Labour	Walter Inward	316	0.55%		
Independent Conservative	Alice Emily McGregor	349	0.61%		
Liberal	John Duncan MacLean	6,672	11.61%		
Independent Conservative	Robert Pope Matheson	715	1.24%		
Independent	Christopher Rowland North	894	1.56%		unknown
Liberal	William Thomas Straith	6,201	10.79%		unknown
**Conservative**	**Harold Despard Twigg**	**7,232**	**11.05%**		unknown
Total valid votes		57,457	100.00%		
Total rejected ballots		251			
Turnout		%			

18th British Columbia election, 1933 ^{19}
Party	Candidate	Votes	%	±	Expenditures
**Independent**	**Herbert Anscomb**	**5,767**	**8.83%**		unknown
Unionist	James Sutherland Brown	1,312	2.01%		
Co-operative Commonwealth Fed.	William Baxter Caird	2,528	3.87%		
Independent Conservative	Robert Cassidy	323	0.49%		
Liberal	Joseph Badenoch Clearihue	5,551	8.50%		unknown
**Co-operative Commonwealth Fed.**	**Robert Connell**	**5,607**	**8.58%**		unknown
Unionist	Frederick James Crowhurst	594	0.91%		
Independents	Clem Davies	5,259	8.05%		unknown
Unionist	Herbert Tom Goodland	910	1.39%		
**Liberal**	**John Hart**	**6,133**	**9.39%**		unknown
Conservative	Reginald Hayward	3,812	5.84%		unknown
**Liberal**	**Byron Ingemar Johnson**	**7,774**	**11.85%**		unknown
Liberal	William Hamilton Kinsman	4,962	7.60%		unknown
Independent	Andrew McGavin	1,054	1.61%		unknown
Independent	Agnes Helen Mason	107	0.16%		unknown
Co-operative Commonwealth Fed.	Victor Rainsford Midgley	2,892	4.43%		unknown
United Front (Workers and Farmers)	Thomas Moir	95	0.15%		
Independent Conservative	William Charles Moresby	2,796	4.28%		
Independent	Christopher Rowland North	412	0.63%		unknown
Labour Party	John Harry Owen	503	0.77%		unknown
Co-operative Commonwealth Fed.	Thomas Guy Sheppard	4,111	6.29%		unknown
Independent	Patrick John Paterson Sinnott	1,557	2.38%		unknown
Independent	Robert Taylor Williams	1,257	1.92%		unknown
Total valid votes		65,316	100.00%		
Total rejected ballots		185			
Turnout		%			
^{19} In addition to William John Bowser (NPIG), the List of Candidates contains five other candidates who did not run on the amended polling day (see note 2): Charles Randall Bishop (NPIG), Joshua Hinchliffe (UPBC), Walter Luney (NPIG), George McGregor (NPIG) and Lorne Ross (IND.).

19th British Columbia election, 1937
Party	Candidate	Votes	%	±	Expenditures
**Conservative**	**Herbert Anscomb**	**6,927**	**10.50%**		unknown
Co-operative Commonwealth Fed.	Kathleen Anderson Bell	2,362	3.58%		unknown
Co-operative Commonwealth Fed.	William Baxter Caird	2,343	3.55%		unknown
BC Constructivist Party	Robert Connell	2,540	3.85%		unknown
Social Credit League	Percival Edward George	401	0.61%		
Social Constructive	Margaret ("Madge") Hall	611	0.93%		
**Liberal**	**John Hart**	**7,196**	**10.91%**		unknown
Liberal	Nancy Hodges	6,259	9.49%		unknown
**Conservative**	**Joseph Douglas Hunter**	6,792	10.30%		unknown
Liberal	Byron Ingemar Johnson	6,440	9.76%		unknown
Social Credit League	Olive Herron Knudsvig	194	0.29%	–	unknown
Conservative	Bruce Alistair McKelvie	6,585	9.98%		unknown
Social Credit League	Charles Bayard Messiter	206	0.31%	–	unknown
Co-operative Commonwealth Fed.	Nigel Morgan	2,536	3.85%		unknown
**Liberal**	**William Thomas Straith**	**6,676**	**10.12%**		unknown
Co-operative Commonwealth Fed.	James Johnstone Walker	2,357	3.57%		unknown
Social Credit League	Frank Saxton White	260	0.39%	–	unknown
Conservative	Frederick Arthur Willis	5,270	7.99%		unknown
Total valid votes		65,955	100.00%		
Total rejected ballots		233			
Turnout		%			

20th British Columbia election, 1941 ^{20}
Party	Candidate	Votes	%	±	Expenditures
Co-operative Commonwealth Fed.	William Baxter Caird	3,358	7.72%		unknown
**Liberal**	**John Hart**	**6,637**	**15.26%**		unknown
**Liberal**	**Nancy Hodges**	**5,854**	**13.46%**		unknown
Conservative	Joseph Douglas Hunter	5,220	12.00%		unknown
Independent	Andrew Henry Jukes	963	2.21%		
Co-operative Commonwealth Fed.	Clare Nulalinda McAllister	3,380	7.77%		unknown
Conservative	Duncan Douglas McTavish	4,657	10.71%		unknown
Co-operative Commonwealth Fed.	Harold Oscar Simpson	2,998	6.89%		unknown
Conservative	Waldo McTavish Skillings	4,150	9.54%		unknown
**Liberal**	**William Thomas Straith**	**6,280**	**14.44%**		unknown
Total valid votes		43,497	100.00%		
Total rejected ballots		131			
Turnout		%			
^{20} Seat reduced from four members to three.

31st British Columbia election, 1945
Party	Candidate	Votes	%	±	Expenditures
Co-operative Commonwealth Fed.	Frederick James Bevis	5,288	10.56%		unknown
Co-operative Commonwealth Fed.	Murray D. Bryce	6,485	12.95%		unknown
Co-operative Commonwealth Fed.	May Campbell	5,093	10.17%		unknown
Independent Progressive Conservative	Ellen Hart	473	0.94%		
Coalition	**John Hart**	**10,757**	**21.48%**		
Coalition	**Nancy Hodges**	**10,518**	**21.01%**		
Social Credit Alliance	Andrew Henry Jukes	743	1.48%		
Labour Progressive Party	Robert Joseph Kerr	436	0.87%		
Coalition	**William Thomas Straith**	**10,278**	**20.53%**		
Total valid votes		50,071	100.00%		
Total rejected ballots		124			

22nd British Columbia election, 1949
Party	Candidate	Votes	%	±	Expenditures
Union of Electors	Edith May Bell	364	0.55%		
Co-operative Commonwealth Fed.	May Campbell	5,809	8.84%		
Union of Electors	William John Clark	696	1.06%		
Coalition	**Nancy Hodges**	**15,982**	**24.33%**		
Union of Electors	Doris Anne Lougheed	319	0.49%		
Coalition	**Daniel John Proudfoot**	**16,021**	**24.39%**		
Co-operative Commonwealth Fed.	Violet J. Rayment	5,310	8.08%		
Coalition	**William Thomas Straith**	**15,278**	**23.26%**		
Co-operative Commonwealth Fed.	Phyllis Jean Webb	5,900	9.00%		
Total valid votes		65,679			
Total rejected ballots		253			

23rd British Columbia election, 1952, Ballot A ^{21}
Party	Candidate	Votes 1st count	%	Votes final count	%	±%	
Social Credit League	Lydia Arsens	4,518	18.96%				
Co-operative Commonwealth Fed.	William Baxter Caird	**6,008**	**25.21%**	**8,421**	**41.09%**		unknown
Independent	Phillip Bernard Freedman	137	0.57%	-	-.- %		unknown
Progressive Conservative	Lillian Margaret Harvey	4,362	18.30%	-	-.- %		unknown
**Liberal**	**Nancy Hodges**	**8,805**	**36.95%**	**12,071**	**58.91%**		unknown
Total valid votes		23,830	100.00%	20,492	%		
Total rejected ballots		1,991					
Turnout		77.94%					
^{21} Candidate choices in multi-member ridings such as Victoria City were split into separate ballot competitions for the elimination ballot. Victoria City ran three fields of candidates, arranged in Ballots A, B, and C. Preferential ballot; first and final counts (of 4) shown only.

23rd British Columbia election, 1952, Ballot B ^{22}
Party	Candidate	Votes 1st count	%	Votes final count	%	±%	
Co-operative Commonwealth Fed.	Colin Cameron	6,329	27.08%	8,902	44.60%		unknown
Social Credit League	Elmer Duncan McEwan	4,365	18.68%				
Progressive Conservative	Albert DeBurgo McPhillips	4,608	19.72%	-	-.- %		unknown
**Liberal**	**Daniel John Proudfoot**	'7,842	**33.56%**	**11,057**	**55.40%**		unknown
Independent	William Alfred Scott	226	0.97%	-	-%		unknown
Total valid votes		23,370	100.00%	19,959	%		
Total rejected ballots		2,424					
Turnout		77.94%					
^{22} Preferential ballot; first and final counts (of 4) shown only.

23rd British Columbia election, 1952, Ballot C ^{23}
Party	Candidate	Votes 1st count	%	Votes final count	%	±%	
Co-operative Commonwealth Fed.	May Campbell	5,975	25.24%	8,511	41.98%		unknown
Progressive Conservative	Walter Sabiston Miles	4,601	19.44%	-	-.- %		unknown
Social Credit League	John Donald Smith	4,637	19.59%				
Liberal	**William Thomas Straith**	8,457	35.73%	11,762	58.02%		unknown
Total valid votes		23,670	100.00%	20,273	%		
Total rejected ballots		2,129					
Turnout		77.94%					
^{23} Preferential ballot; first and final counts only (of 3) shown.

24th British Columbia election, 1953 Ballot A ^{24}
Party	Candidate	Votes 1st count	%	Votes final count	%	±%	
Co-operative Commonwealth Fed.	Thomas Victor Allen	4,881	21.42%	1 -	-.- %		unknown
Social Credit	**Lydia Arsens**	**8,616**	**37.81%**	**9,999**	**52.99%**		
Labor-Progressive	Doris Winifred Blakey	126	0.55%	-	-.- %		
Progressive Conservative	Arthur St. Clair Chapman	1,227	5.38%	-	-%		unknown
Independent	Claude Lionel Harrison	1,022	4.49%	-	-.- %		unknown
Liberal	Nancy Hodges	6,915	30.35%	8,869	47.01%		unknown
Total valid votes		22,787	100.00%	18,868	%		
Total rejected ballots		1,804					
Total Registered Voters							
Turnout		%					
^{24} See Note on 1952 Election Ballot A. Preferential ballot; first and final counts (of 5) shown only.

24th British Columbia election, 1953 Ballot B ^{25}
Party	Candidate	Votes 1st count	%	Votes final count	%	±%	
Co-operative Commonwealth Fed.	Colin Cameron	5,267	23.50%	-	-.- %		unknown
Social Credit	**William Neelands Chant**	9,131	40.73%	10,330	55.32%		
Labor-Progressive	Archibald McGugan	153	0.68%	-	-.- %		
Liberal	Daniel John Proudfoot	6,484	28.92%	8,344	44.68%		unknown
Progressive Conservative	Montague Laurence Tyrwhitt-Drake ^{26}	1,383	6.17%	-	-%		unknown
Total valid votes		22,418	100.00%	18,674	%		
Total rejected ballots		2,162					
Total Registered Voters							
Turnout		%					
^{25} Preferential ballot; final count is between top two candidates from first count; intermediary counts (of 4) not shown
^{26} Listed as "Drake, Montagne Lawrence Tyrwhitt" in Statement of Votes. In 1956 Statement of Votes he was listed as Tyrwhitt-Drake.

24th British Columbia election, 1953 Ballot C ^{27}
Party	Candidate	Votes 1st count	%	Votes final count	%	±%	
Co-operative Commonwealth Fed.	May Campbell	4,923	21.96%	-	-.- %		unknown
Labor-Progressive	Irving Floyd Mortensen	127	0.57%	-	-.- %		
Progressive Conservative	Robert James Patch	1,139	5.08%	-	-%		unknown
Liberal	William Thomas Straith	7,193	32.09%	8,907	46.90%		unknown
Social Credit	**Walter Percival Wright**	**9,032**	**40.30%**	**10,084**	**53.10%**		
Total valid votes		22,414	100.00%	18,991	%		
Total rejected ballots		2,173					
Total Registered Voters							
Turnout		%					
^{27} Preferential ballot; first and final counts (of 4) not shown							

British Columbia provincial by-election, November 24, 1953 Resignation of Walter Percival Wright
Party	Candidate	Votes	%
Liberal	George Frederick Thompson Gregory	8,456	41.33
Social Credit	Einar Maynard Gunderson	8,366	40.89
Co-operative Commonwealth	Alfred George Victor Matthews	2,495	12.08
Progressive Conservative	Douglas Deane Finlayson	981	4.79
Labor-Progressive	Doris Winifred Blakely	161	0.79
Total valid votes		20,661	
Total rejected ballots		202	
Source: Elections BC

25th British Columbia election, 1956
Party	Candidate	Votes	%	±	Expenditures
Social Credit	Lydia Arsens	7,827	5.02%	–	unknown
Labour Progressive Party	Myrtle Woodward Bergren	124	0.08%		unknown
Labour Progressive Party	Doris Winifred Blakey	143	1.10%		unknown
Co-operative Commonwealth	William Baxter Caird	3,417	2.19%		unknown
Co-operative Commonwealth	May Campbell	3,432	5.67%		unknown
Social Credit	**William Neelands Chant**	**9,199**	**14.95%**	–	unknown
Liberal	Geoffrey Innes Edgelow	7,241	11.96%	unknown	
**Liberal**	**George Frederick Thompson Gregory**	**8,408**	**13.89%**		unknown
Co-operative Commonwealth	Neil Johnson MacGregor Hindle	3,265	5.39%		unknown
Labour Progressive Party	Ernest Leon Knott	162	0.27%		unknown
Liberal	Forrest Linden Shaw	7,205	11.91%		unknown
Social Credit	**John Donald Smith**	**8,620**	**14.24%**	–	unknown
Progressive Conservative	Montague Lawrence Tyrwhitt-Drake	1,476	2.44%		unknown
Total valid votes		60,519	100.00%		
Total rejected ballots		212			
Turnout		%			

26th British Columbia election, 1960
Party	Candidate	Votes	%	±	Expenditures
Progressive Conservative	Clive D. Campbell	1,959	3.00%		unknown
CCF	May Campbell	4,598	7.04%		unknown
Social Credit	**William Neelands Chant**	**9,864**	**15.10%**	–	unknown
Progressive Conservative	Theodore H. Cressy	1,543	2.36%		unknown
Liberal	Geoffrey Innes Edgelow	6,083	9.31%	unknown	
CCF	Rhoda Erickson	4,262	6.52%		unknown
Liberal	George Frederick Thompson Gregory	7,278	11.14%		unknown
CCF	Neil John MacGregor Hindle	4,516	6.91%		unknown
Liberal	George Frederick Thompson Gregory	8,408	13.89%		unknown
Progressive Conservative	Charles A.P. Murison	2,236	3.42%		unknown
Liberal	Forrest Linden Shaw	5,464	8.36%		unknown
Social Credit	**Waldo McTavish Skillings**	**8,671**	**13.27%**	–	unknown
Social Credit	**John Donald Smith**	**8,855**	**13.55%**	–	unknown
Total valid votes		65,329	100.00%		
Total rejected ballots		388			
Turnout		%			

27th British Columbia election, 1963
Party	Candidate	Votes	%	±	Expenditures
Social Credit	**William Neelands Chant**	**9,736**	**5.42%**	–	unknown
Progressive Conservative	Theodore H. Cressy	2,282	1.27%		unknown
New Democratic	Henry A.L. Fanthorpe	3,324	1.85%		unknown
Liberal	Elizabeth Forbes	4,355	2.43%		unknown
Progressive Conservative	William Charles Gelling	2,528	1.41%	unknown	
Liberal	Michael Griffin	4,440	7.57%		unknown
Liberal	Bruce Humber	4,302	7.33%		unknown
Communist	Ernest Leon Knott	153	0.26%		unknown
Progressive Conservative	John Wilberforce Loader	2,253	3.84%		unknown
New Democratic	David Philip Reimer	3,275	5.58%		unknown
Social Credit	**Waldo McTavish Skillings**	**9,347**	**15.93%**	–	unknown
Social Credit	**John Donald Smith**	**9,118**	**15.54%**	–	unknown
New Democratic	Alfred W. Toone	3,557	6.06%		unknown
Total valid votes		58,670	100.00%		
Total rejected ballots		175			
Turnout		%			

Legislative Assembly of British Columbia
Preceded by South Nanaimo; Dewdney; Dewdney; Prince Rupert	Constituency represented by the premier 1902–1903; 1907–1915; 1920–1924; 1941–1947	Succeeded by Dewdney; Vancouver City; Nelson; New Westminster
Preceded by position established Kamloops	Constituency represented by the speaker 1872–1878; 1949–1952	Succeeded by Esquimalt; Delta
Preceded by Newcastle; Prince Rupert	Constituency represented by the leader of the Opposition; 1916; 1933–1937	Succeeded by Vancouver City; Dewdney
