= Joseph Trutch =

Canadian politician (1826–1904)

The Honourable Sir Joseph William Trutch KCMG
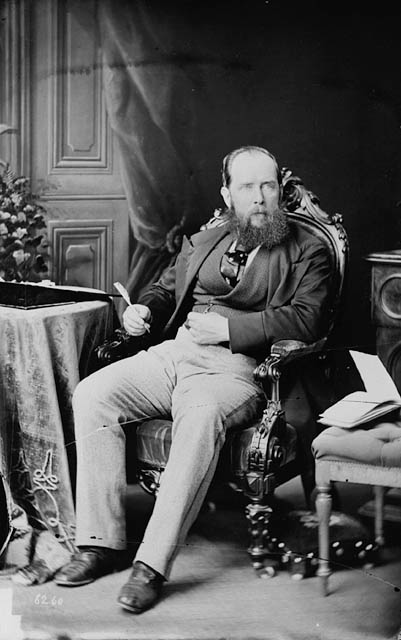
- Joseph Trutch, c. June 1870

1st Lieutenant Governor of British Columbia
- In office 5 July 1871 – 27 June 1876
- Monarch: Victoria
- Governors General: The Lord Lisgar; The Earl of Dufferin
- Premier: John Foster McCreight; Amor De Cosmos; George Anthony Walkem; Andrew Charles Elliott
- Preceded by: Anthony Musgrave
- Succeeded by: Albert Norton Richards

Member of the Legislative Assembly of Vancouver Island for Victoria District
- In office 26 November 1861 – 27 February 1863 Serving with William Fraser Tolmie and James Trimble
- Preceded by: Henry Pering Pellew Crease
- Succeeded by: Edward Henry Jackson

Personal details
- Born: 18 January 1826 Ashcott, England
- Died: 2 March 1904 (aged 78) Brompton Ralph, Somerset, England
- Spouse: Julia Elizabeth Hyde (m. 1855)
- Education: Mount Radford School
- Occupation: Colonial governor
- Profession: Civil engineer, land surveyor

Sir Joseph William Trutch, KCMG (18 January 1826 – 2 March 1904) was a Canadian civil engineer, land surveyor, and politician who served as the first Lieutenant Governor of the Confederated British Columbia. During his tenure, he implemented various anti-Indigenous policies. Streets, towns and residences in Vancouver, Victoria and Richmond were initially named after him; however, many of them have since been renamed due to his racism.

== Early life and career ==
Joseph was born in Ashcott, England, the son of William Trutch and his wife, Charlotte Hannah Barnes. William Trutch completed his apprenticeship to qualify as a solicitor in London, after which he moved to Jamaica. In 1822 he married Hannah Barnes daughter of Joseph Barnes, a prominent merchant, politician and slave owner. Trutch's early childhood was spent partly in Jamaica, although his family returned to England in 1831, where he later attended Mount Radford School in Exeter. Following an apprenticeship to civil engineer John Rennie, he travelled to California after hearing news of the California Gold Rush of 1849. He arrived in British Columbia in 1859, following the Fraser Canyon Gold Rush of 1858.

He found employment by working various government contracts as a surveyor, and in 1862 was contracted to construct a portion of the Cariboo Road between Chapmans Bar and Boston Bar along the canyon of the Fraser River. Tolls collected from a suspension bridge along the road, along with prudent land acquisitions, made Trutch a wealthy man.

In 1867, Trutch refused to recognize the legitimacy of the reserves established by the former governor, James Douglas, and had them re-surveyed, reducing their size by 91%.

In a letter to his mother, Charlotte, regarding the Indians of the Oregon Territory, he wrote, "I think they are the ugliest and laziest creatures I ever saw and we should as soon think of being afraid of our dogs as of them." (23 June 1850, Joseph Trutch Papers, UBCL, folder A1.b.) Additionally, in a letter to the Secretary of State, "I have not yet met with a single Indian whom I consider to have attained even the most glimmering perception of the Christian creed."

== Province of British Columbia ==
In 1863 Trutch's sister, Caroline Agnes Trutch, married Peter O'Reilly and in 1870, Trutch's brother John married the sister of the colonial governor Anthony Musgrave. Trutch and Musgrave became close. Following the establishment of Canadian Confederation in 1867, they worked together to negotiate British Columbia's entry, which occurred in 1871 after they secured a promise for the construction of the Canadian Pacific Railway (CPR).

Trutch was the first Lieutenant Governor of the Confederated British Columbia, from 1871 to 1876. Following his tenure as lieutenant governor, Trutch was appointed a "Dominion agent for British Columbia", and helped to oversee the construction of the CPR in the province.

His policies as lieutenant governor are regarded today as racist. He dramatically reduced the area of reserves which had been negotiated when British Columbia entered Confederation in 1871. Additionally, he forbade the purchase of lands by Indigenous people from non-Indigenous owners. One of his policies banned Stó꞉lō families from owning over 10 acres of land.

He left this office in 1890 and returned to England. He died there in 1904 in Somerset, the county of his birth.

== Place namesakes and renaming ==
The locality of Trutch, British Columbia (57°44′N 122°57′W) along the Alaska Highway is named after Joseph Trutch. The location is now a ghost town.

In 2007, a panel of historians hired by The Beaver (now Canada's History) included Trutch in their list of the ten worst Canadians in history.

In 2021, there were plans to rename a street in Chilliwack bearing his name.

A student residence building named for Trutch at the University of Victoria was renamed Lansdowne Residence #1 in 2017 because of his actions and words related to Indigenous peoples. In 2024 the building was finally gifted the name of "siʔčə́ŋəɬ ʔéʔləŋ" with name roots from a Lək̓ʷəŋən village near Cattle Point.

A residential street in the Kitsilano neighbourhood of Vancouver was originally named Trutch Street until a decision in 2021 to rename the street with a Musqueam name due to Trutch's anti-indigenous policies. On 30 September 2022, the second annual National Day for Truth and Reconciliation, the street was gifted the name "šxʷməθkʷəy̓əmasəm" (a Halkomelem name translating to "Musqueamview") by the Musqueam Indian Band, which was then formally adopted by the city on 17 June 2025.

In May 2022, a residential street in Richmond was similarly renamed from Trutch Avenue to Point Avenue due to the perceived racism and injustice of Trutch's governorship, and to honour the 28th lieutenant governor of British Columbia, Steven Point.

On 11 July 2022, Trutch Street in Victoria was renamed Su'it Street (Lekwungen: səʔít). The name, in the language of the Songhees and Esquimalt First Nations, Lekwungen, means "truth". This was after a unanimous vote in February 2022 by the Victoria City Council to rename the street, to further reconciliation efforts by the city.
