= Albert Edward McPhillips =

Canadian politician

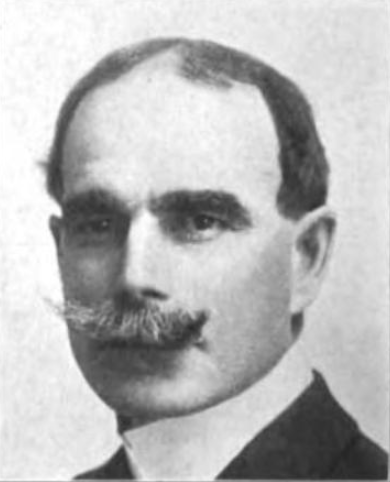

Member of the Legislative Assembly of British Columbia
- In office 1907–1913
- Preceded by: Thomas Wilson Paterson
- Succeeded by: William Wasbrough Foster
- Constituency: The Islands
- In office 1898–1903 Serving with Richard Hall; Henry Dallas Helmcken; John Herbert Turner
- Constituency: Victoria City

Attorney General of British Columbia
- In office June 4, 1903 – November 5, 1903
- Preceded by: David McEwen Eberts
- Succeeded by: Charles Wilson

Personal details
- Born: 21 March 1861 Ohio City, York County, Canada West
- Died: 24 January 1938 (aged 76) Victoria, British Columbia, Canada
- Spouse: Sophia Emily Davie
- Children: 3, including Albert DeBurgo
- Education: St. Boniface College; Manitoba College
- Profession: Barrister; solicitor

Albert Edward McPhillips (21 March 1861 – 24 January 1938) was a Canadian politician and a barrister.

== Early years ==
He was the son of George McPhillips (born County Monaghan, 1805–1878) and Margaret Lavin (born County Armagh), both of whom were Irish and he was the youngest of six boys. His father and three brothers were land surveyors. His brother, George McPhillips Jr. (1848–1913) is commemorated by McPhillips Street in Winnipeg.

== Military service ==
McPhillips held a second class certificate from Toronto School of Infantry. He was a lieutenant in the 90th Battalion, Royal Winnipeg Rifles, during the North-West Rebellion in 1885. He fought at the Battle of Fish Creek and Battle of Batoche and received a medal bar and clasp. He retired in 1890 with the rank of captain.

== Law and political career ==
McPhillips was called to the Bar in Manitoba, in Trinity Term in 1882, and to the Bar of British Columbia in 1891. He was a member of Legislative assembly for British Columbia, serving Victoria City from 1898 to 1903, and The Islands from 1907 to 1912. He was Attorney General of British Columbia, resigning on 5 November 1903. McPhillips sat on the British Columbia Court of Appeal as a judge from 1913, serving up until his death in 1938.

== Personal life ==
In 1896, he married Sophia Emily Davie, daughter of the late Hon. A.E.B. Davie Q.C. and had 3 children. His youngest son Albert McPhillips was also a barrister and politician.

== Arms ==
Coat of arms of Albert Edward McPhillips
Notes Granted by Nevile Wilkinson, Ulster King of Arms, 12 August 1908. Crest On a wreath of the colours a demi-cat regardant collared and chained all Or holding between the paws a cross engrailed Gules. Escutcheon Or a cross engrailed Gules on a chief Ermine a lion rampant issuant Sable. Motto A Cruce Salus
