= Einar Maynard Gunderson =

Canadian politician (1899–1980)

Einar Gunderson
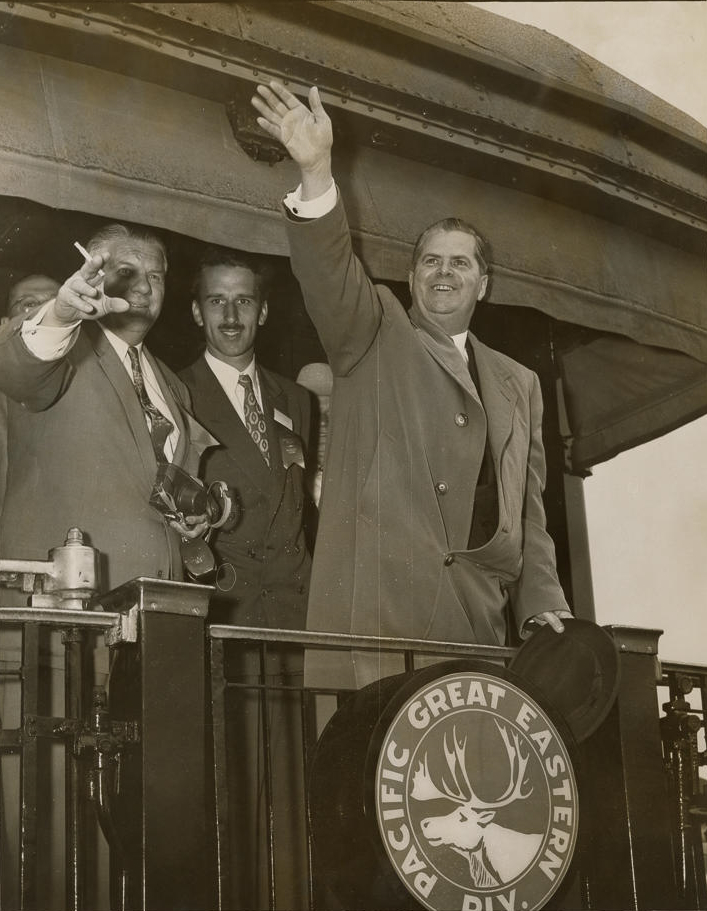
- Gunderson (left) seen in 1958 with Premier W. A. C. Bennett

Minister of Finance of British Columbia
- In office August 1, 1952 – February 15, 1954
- Premier: W. A. C. Bennett
- Preceded by: Boss Johnson
- Succeeded by: W. A. C. Bennett

Member of the British Columbia Legislative Assembly for Similkameen
- In office November 24, 1952 – June 9, 1953
- Preceded by: Harry Denyer Francis
- Succeeded by: Frank Richter Jr.

Personal details
- Born: July 6, 1899 Cooperstown, North Dakota
- Died: January 11, 1980 (aged 80) Vancouver, British Columbia
- Party: Social Credit
- Spouse: Marguerite Johnson
- Occupation: Accountant

Einar Maynard Gunderson (July 6, 1899 – January 11, 1980) was a chartered accountant and political figure in Canada. He served as Minister of Finance of British Columbia under Premier W. A. C. Bennett from 1952 to 1954, and member of the Legislative Assembly (MLA) for Similkameen from 1952 to 1953 as a Social Credit member.

== Biography ==
Born in Cooperstown, North Dakota, Gunderson worked as secretary and chief accountant of the Alberta Department of Lands and Mines in 1930, and served as president of the Institute of Chartered Accountants of Alberta in 1936. He had lived in British Columbia since 1939, and operated accounting offices in Victoria and Vancouver.

Following the 1952 British Columbia general election, the Social Credit Party formed a minority government. Party leader W. A. C. Bennett elected to look outside his caucus of mostly inexperienced MLAs, and approached the unelected Gunderson (whom he had befriended while living in Edmonton) to serve as finance minister; Gunderson was sworn in on August 1, 1952 along with the rest of the Bennett ministry. To provide him with a seat in the legislature, Similkameen MLA Harry Denyer Francis resigned to trigger a by-election, which was won by Gunderson in November 1952.

Gunderson ran in the Vancouver Island riding of Oak Bay in the June 1953 general election, but lost to the incumbent Liberal candidate Philip Archibald Gibbs. He then contested a November 1953 by-election in Victoria City triggered by the resignation of Walter Percival Wright, but lost by 90 votes to Liberal candidate George Frederick Thompson Gregory. He stayed on as finance minister until Bennett took over the role in February 1954.

Despite his election losses, Gunderson continued to serve as financial adviser to Bennett's government. He also served as vice-president of the Pacific Great Eastern Railway (later renamed BC Rail) and as a director of the British Columbia Toll Bridge and Highways Authority, of the Canadian Bank of Commerce, of Black Ball Ferries Ltd. and of Deeks-McBride Ltd., a cement and gravel supply company. Gunderson was a member of the board of governors for the University of British Columbia from 1957 to 1968. In 1967, he was named provisional chairman of the Bank of British Columbia. Gunderson also served on the board of directors for BC Hydro until the New Democratic Party came into power in 1972; he was removed from the board of directors of BC Rail at the same time.

He died in Vancouver at the age of 80 in 1980.
