= Joe Hunter =

Joe or Joseph Hunter may refer to:

== Music ==
- Joe Hunter (musician) (1927–2007), American pianist, member of the Funk Brothers
- Ivory Joe Hunter (1914–1974), American songwriter, singer and pianist
- Ivy Jo Hunter (1940), American record producer, singer and songwriter

== Politics ==
- Joseph Hunter (Canadian politician) (1839–1935), member of the Legislative Assembly of British Columbia for Cariboo
- Joseph Douglas Hunter (1881–1970), Canadian politician in the Legislative Assembly of British Columbia
- Joseph Hunter (British politician) (1875–1935), Scottish politician, Liberal (later National Liberal) Member of Parliament (MP) 1929–1935

== Sports ==
- Joe Hunter (cricketer) (1855–1891), English cricketer
- Joseph Hunter (rugby union) (1899–1984), American rugby union player

== Other people ==
- Joseph Hunter (antiquarian) (1783–1861), English Unitarian Minister and antiquarian, historian of Sheffield and South Yorkshire
- Joe Hunter, American contestant of Survivor 48
