= Andrew Charles Elliott =

Premier of British Columbia from 1876 to 1878

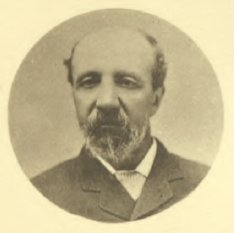
- Hon. Andrew Charles Elliott

4th Premier of British Columbia
- In office February 1, 1876 – February 11, 1878
- Monarch: Queen Victoria
- Lieutenant Governor: Joseph Trutch; Albert Norton Richards
- Preceded by: George Anthony Walkem
- Succeeded by: George Anthony Walkem

MLA for Victoria City
- In office September 11, 1875 – May 22, 1878 Serving with Robert Beaven, James W. Douglas, James Trimble
- Preceded by: John Foster McCreight
- Succeeded by: John W. Williams

Personal details
- Born: June 22, 1829 Ireland
- Died: April 9, 1889 (aged 59) San Francisco
- Party: None

Andrew Charles Elliott (June 22, 1829 – April 9, 1889) was a British Columbian politician and jurist who was the fourth premier of British Columbia from 1876 to 1878.

== Career ==
Elliott's varied career in British Columbia included gold commissioner, stipendiary magistrate, and, following the union of the Island and Mainland Colonies in 1866, high sheriff of the province. He resigned his magistracy to take the post as High Sheriff. He was a member of the colony's appointed Colonial Assembly from 1865 to 1866. After the colony became a province of Canada, he was elected, in 1875, to the Victoria City seat in the provincial legislature and became leader of the opposition. Before his election to the House, he was a provincial magistrate in Lillooet.

In 1876, Elliott became the fourth Premier of the province on the defeat of George Anthony Walkem's government in a Motion of No Confidence. His government was unstable, and he was unable to make progress with the federal government on the province's demands that Ottawa builds a railway to the Pacific. Tax increases and the government's failure to secure a railway terminus for Victoria, British Columbia led to Elliott's defeat in his riding in the 1878 election as well as the defeat of his government.

== Death ==
Andrew Charles Elliott is interred in the Ross Bay Cemetery in Victoria, British Columbia. His obituary in Amor de Cosmos' Victoria Colonist newspaper read:

He administered justice with a fearless hand and soon had discordant elements well in check. He was a genial, whole-souled gentleman of generous impulses and possessed the highest kind of honor. He was a brave man.

== Family life ==
His daughter Mary married James W. Douglas, the only son of James Douglas, but his son-in-law died at age 32, and Elliott was one of the pallbearers at the funeral.
