= Charles Hayward (politician) =

Canadian politician (1839–1919)

Sir Charles Hayward (May 12, 1839 – July 8, 1919) was the 25th mayor of Victoria, British Columbia, from 1900–1902. He had one of the more unusual professions: Starting off as a carpenter, he went into the business of making coffins and turned that into a very successful funeral business, one which remains today. Hayward's son Reginald also served as mayor (1922–1924) and continued to expand the business. They remain the only father and son mayors in Victoria history.

He was born in Stratford, Essex, England, the son of Charles Hayward and Harriet Tomlinson. He apprenticed as a carpenter and joiner and came to Victoria, British Columbia in 1862. He first entered the contracting business and then, in 1867, became an undertaker. Hayward was also involved in mining, building and manufacturing. He served as an alderman in 1873, 1874 and 1899 and was also chairman of the school board and a justice of the peace. Hayward married Sarah Chesney in 1862. He died in 1919 in Victoria, British Columbia at the age of 80.

== See also ==
- List of mayors of Victoria, British Columbia
