= John Foster McCreight =

Canadian politician and jurist (1827-1913)

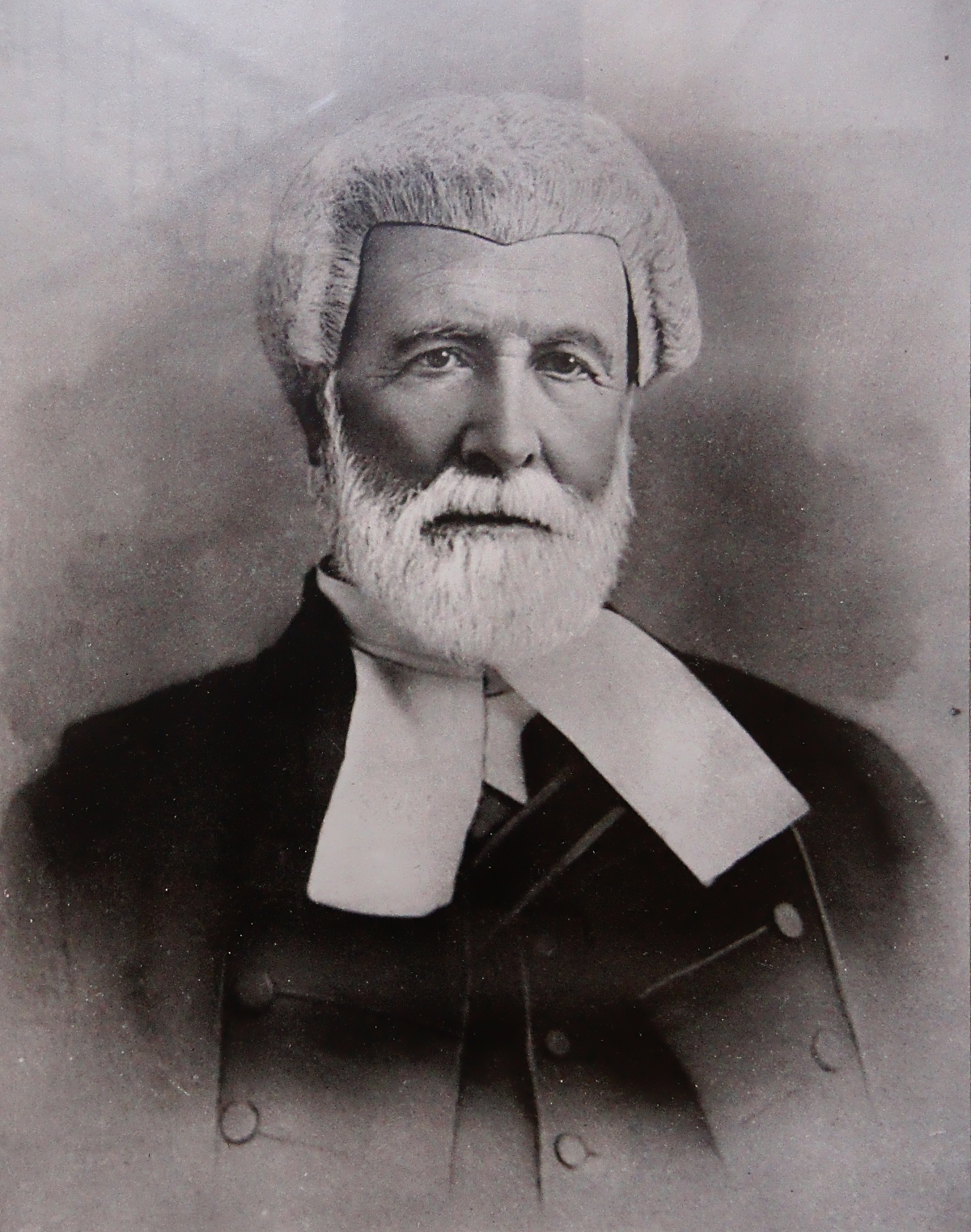
- Hon. John Foster McCreight

1st Premier of British Columbia
- In office 14 November 1871 – 23 December 1872
- Monarch: Victoria
- Lieutenant Governor: Joseph Trutch
- Preceded by: position established
- Succeeded by: Amor De Cosmos

Attorney General of British Columbia
- In office 22 August 1871 – 23 December 1872
- Premier: Himself
- Preceded by: George Phillippo
- Succeeded by: George Anthony Walkem

Member of the Legislative Assembly for Victoria City
- In office 16 October 1871 – 11 September 1875 Serving with Robert Beaven, Simeon Duck, James Trimble
- Preceded by: New riding
- Succeeded by: Andrew Charles Elliott

Personal details
- Born: 1827 (Bap. 3 Sept.) Caledon, County Tyrone, Ireland
- Died: 18 November 1913 (aged 86) Hastings, East Sussex, United Kingdom
- Party: None
- Spouse: Anna Johanna McCreight
- Cabinet: McCreight ministry

John Foster McCreight, QC (1827 – 18 November 1913) was a jurist and the first premier of British Columbia.

== Early life ==
McCreight was born in Caledon, County Tyrone, Ireland, to a well-established and well-connected family. After completing law studies at Trinity College Dublin, he was called to the bar in 1852. Shortly thereafter, McCreight left Ireland to establish a practice in Melbourne, Australia. McCreight left Australia in 1859 and sailed first to San Francisco and then to Victoria, British Columbia.

== Life and career in British Columbia ==
At the time of McCreight's arrival in Victoria in 1860, it was the capital of the Colony of Vancouver Island, which at the time was governed by the powerful and autocratic Chief Factor of the Hudson's Bay Company, Sir James Douglas. In 1862, McCreight was called to the British Columbia bar and opened a practice in Victoria. By all accounts, he led a quiet and solitary life in the city, his main occupations outside of his work being his involvement in the local Masonic Lodge and as an active layperson in the congregation of the local Anglican cathedral.

By 1866, the colonies of Vancouver Island and British Columbia had merged. Although the united colony did not join the Canadian Confederation when it was effected in 1867, the worrisome economic and strategic situation soon made such an arrangement attractive. British Columbia joined confederation on 20 July 1871, and McCreight joined the interim transitional cabinet as Attorney General. During the first provincial general election that October, McCreight won a seat for Victoria City in the legislature, and Sir Joseph Trutch, the Lieutenant Governor, chose him to be British Columbia's first premier. He continued to hold the attorney-generalship as well.

By all accounts, McCreight was temperamentally ill-suited to public life. His colleague, Henry Pering Pellew Crease, described the Premier as "bad tempered and queer...by fits & turns extremely credulous & extremely suspicious...excessively obstinate in the wrong places...close and reserved in his daily life...[and] utterly ignorant of politics". Nonetheless, McCreight's administration was a productive one, passing three dozen pieces of legislation in less than a year. His inability to form alliances and mollify the sometimes narrow and sectional interests of MLAs led to a loss of support, however, and in 1872, he resigned after losing a motion of no confidence following the Speech from the Throne.

He served as the first Treasurer (chief elected officer) of the incorporated Law Society of British Columbia from 1874 to 1880.

== Supreme Court Justice and retirement ==
McCreight remained in the legislature until 1875, after which he returned to his law practice as a Queen's Counsel. Five years later, he was made a justice of the Supreme Court of British Columbia. In that capacity, he served in the Cariboo, Victoria, and finally in 1883 New Westminster before retiring in 1897, at the age of 70. He experienced a crisis of faith, sometime in the 1880s and converted to Roman Catholicism in 1883. McCreight returned to the United Kingdom, dying at Hastings, East Sussex at the age of 86.

== Legacy ==
McCreight Lake, north west of Campbell River, British Columbia is named for him.
