= Walter Percival Wright =

Canadian politician

MLA for Victoria City
- In office 1953–1953

Personal details
- Born: March 19, 1909 Moose Jaw, Saskatchewan
- Died: September 1, 1992 (aged 83) Victoria, British Columbia
- Party: Social Credit

Walter Percival "Percy" Wright (March 19, 1909 – September 1, 1992) was a Canadian politician. He won one of the three seats in the electoral district of Victoria City for the British Columbia Social Credit Party during the 1953 British Columbia general election but did not serve. He resigned on October 19, 1953, to provide a seat to the Minister of Finance, Einar Maynard Gunderson; however, Gunderson was unsuccessful in the resulting by-election held on November 24, 1953, and the Liberal George Gregory won the seat instead. Wright did not run in any subsequent provincial or federal elections.
