= William George Cameron =

Canadian politician (1853–1930)

MLA for Victoria City
- In office 1903–1907

Personal details
- Born: September 25, 1853 Calaveras County, California, United States
- Died: October 29, 1930 (aged 77) Victoria, British Columbia, Canada
- Party: Liberal

William George Cameron (September 25, 1853 – October 29, 1930) was a Canadian politician. After being defeated in the 1894 provincial election, he served in the Legislative Assembly of British Columbia from 1903 until his defeat in the 1907 election, for the electoral district of Victoria City, as a Liberal.
