= Frederick Davey =

Canadian politician (1847–1926)

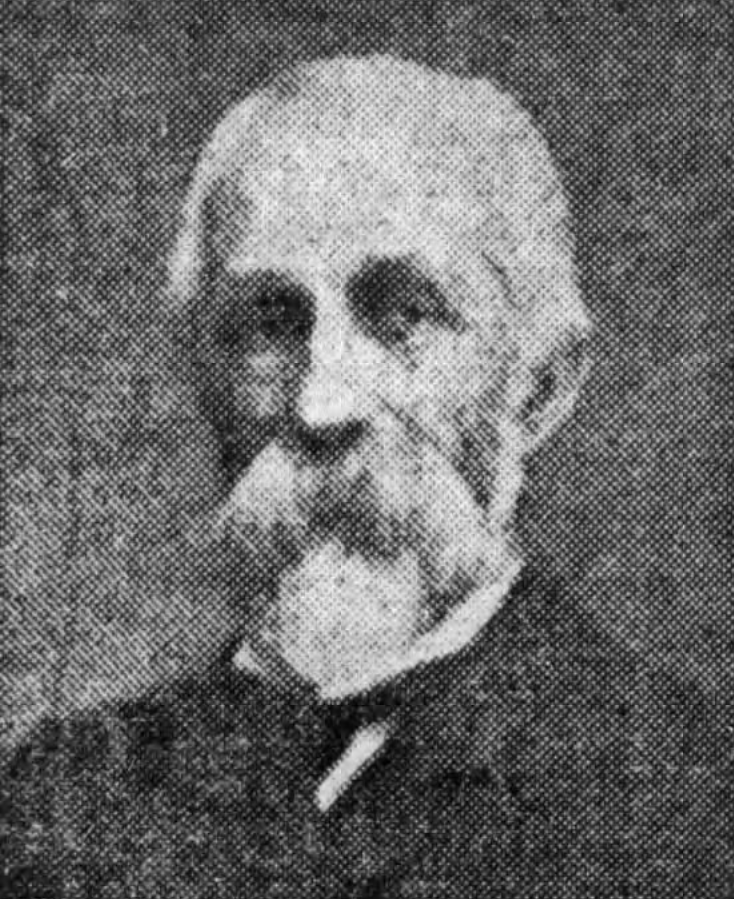

Member of the Legislative Assembly of British Columbia
- In office 1907–1916
- Constituency: Victoria City

Personal details
- Born: February 22, 1847 Truro, England
- Died: April 24, 1926 (aged 79) Victoria, British Columbia
- Party: Conservative
- Spouse: A. Roberts (m. 1890)
- Occupation: Politician

Frederick Davey (February 22, 1847 – April 24, 1926) was an English-born political figure in British Columbia. He represented Victoria City in the Legislative Assembly of British Columbia from 1907 to 1916 as a Conservative. He did not seek a fourth term in the 1916 provincial election.

He was born in Truro, Cornwall, and educated in Camborne. In 1890, he married A. Roberts. He served as an alderman for the city of Victoria in 1906. He died in Victoria at the age of 79.
