= Henry Broughton Thomson =

Canadian politician (1870–1939)

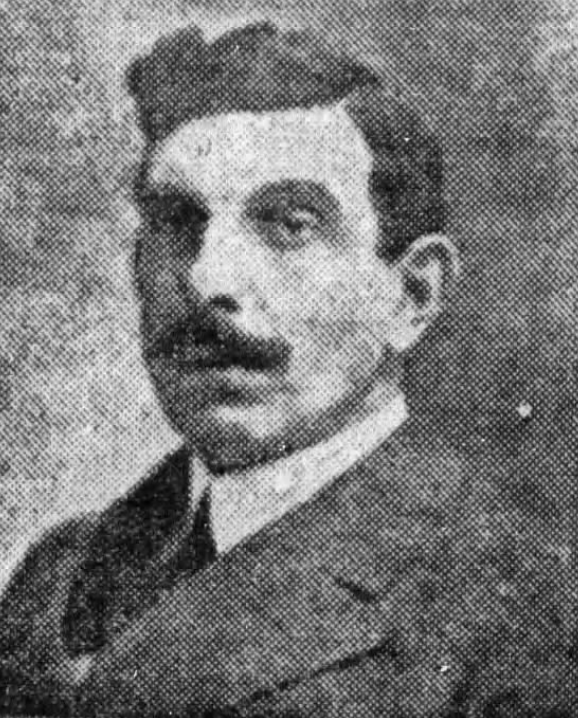

Member of the Legislative Assembly of British Columbia
- In office 1907–1916
- Constituency: Victoria City

Personal details
- Born: July 21, 1870 Newry, Northern Ireland
- Died: September 17, 1939 (aged 69) Vancouver, British Columbia
- Party: Conservative
- Relatives: William Montgomerie Thomson (brother)
- Occupation: Merchant, politician

Henry Broughton Thomson (July 21, 1870 – September 17, 1939) was a Canadian merchant and political figure in British Columbia. He represented Victoria City from 1907 to 1916 in the Legislative Assembly of British Columbia as a Conservative. He did not seek a fourth term in the 1916 provincial election.

He was born in Newry, County Down, the eldest son of Captain William Thomson and Alice Broughton. He had several brothers, including William Montgomery Thomson; Gwyneth Bebb married another brother, Thomas Weldon Thomson.

He was educated in Bedford, England. Thomson came to British Columbia in 1893. He was a director of Turner, Beeton & Co., of the Colonist Printing & Publishing Co., of the Victoria Transfer Co. Ltd and of the Silicon Brick Lime Co. Ltd. Thomson served as whip for the Conservative Party in the assembly. In 1918, he was named chairman of the Canadian Food Board. Thomson died in Vancouver at the age of 69.
