= George Frederick Thompson Gregory =

Canadian politician

George Frederick Thompson Gregory, DSC (September 10, 1916 – April 14, 1973) was a lawyer, judge and political figure in British Columbia. He represented Victoria City in the Legislative Assembly of British Columbia from 1953 to 1960 as a Liberal.

He was born in Victoria, British Columbia in 1916, the son of Francis B. Gregory, and was educated at the University of British Columbia and Harvard Law School. He was admitted to the British Columbia bar in 1941. In the same year, he joined the Royal Canadian Navy and served during World War II, earning the Distinguished Service Cross. In 1945, Gregory began the practice of law in Victoria. He was first elected to the provincial assembly in a 1953 by-election held after Walter Percival Wright resigned his seat to allow Einar Maynard Gunderson to run for a seat in the assembly. Gregory was re-elected in 1956, but defeated when he ran for re-election in 1960. He ran for the leadership of the provincial Liberal Party in 1959, losing to Ray Perrault. From 1964 until his death in 1973, Gregory served as a justice of the Supreme Court of British Columbia. The cause of his death was a self-inflicted gunshot wound.
