= Robert Allan Gus Lyons =

Canadian politician (1890–1984)

MLA for Victoria City
- In office 1924–1928

Personal details
- Born: July 8, 1890 London, Ontario
- Died: December 27, 1984 (aged 94) Vancouver, British Columbia
- Party: Conservative

Robert Allan "Gus" Lyons (July 8, 1890 – December 27, 1984) was a bond broker and political figure in British Columbia. He represented Victoria City from 1924 until his retirement at the 1928 provincial election as a Conservative.

He was born in London, Ontario, the son of Robert A. Lyons and Margaret Clark. Lyons served during World War I and was wounded, losing a leg. He was awarded the Distinguished Conduct Medal and the French Croix de Guerre. Lyons reached the rank of major. He died in Vancouver at the age of 94.
