= James W. Douglas =

Canadian politician (1851–1883)

James William Douglas (June 1, 1851 – November 7, 1883) was a Canadian who represented Victoria City in the Legislative Assembly of British Columbia from 1875 until his retirement at the 1878 provincial election.

He was born in Victoria, Colony of Vancouver Island, the son of Sir James Douglas, the first governor of Vancouver Island, and Amelia Connolly. James had been born in British Guiyana to a Scottish planter father and a free woman of colour. Amelia was the Anglo-Métis daughter of William Connolly, fur trader, and his Cree wife; she grew up at the Hudson's Bay Company forts managed by her father.

Douglas was educated in Victoria. He served in the local militia. For a time, he studied law with John Foster McCreight. In 1877, Douglas married Mary, the daughter of Andrew Charles Elliott. He died in San Francisco on November 7, 1883, aged 32.
