= Henry Frederick William Behnsen =

Canadian politician (1852–1938)

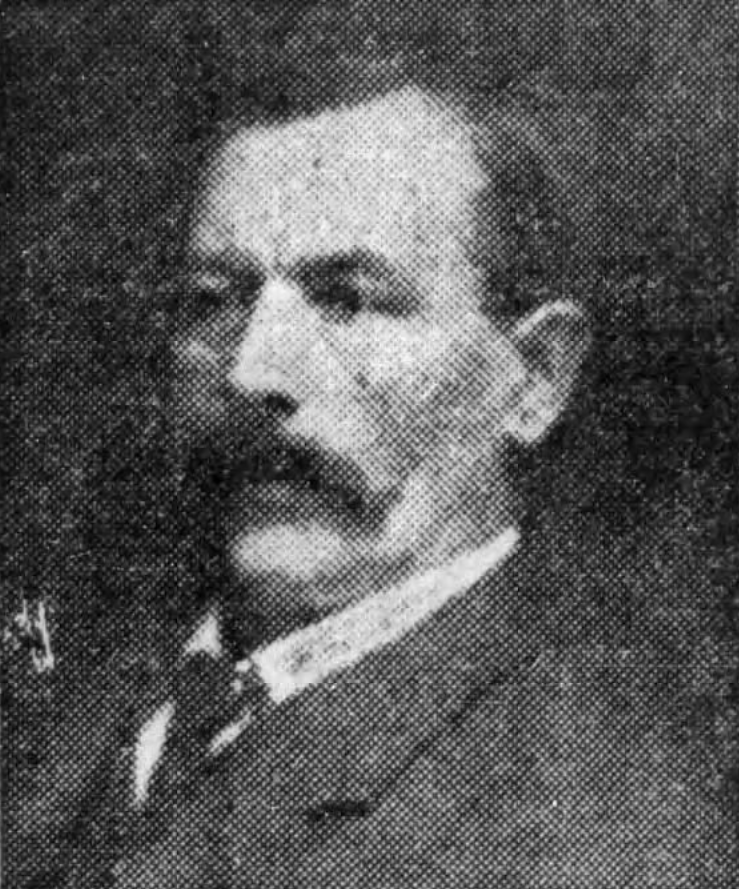

Member of the Legislative Assembly of British Columbia
- In office 1907–1916
- Constituency: Victoria City

Personal details
- Born: March 16, 1852 Hanover, German Confederation
- Died: March 6, 1938 (aged 85) Seattle, Washington
- Party: Conservative
- Spouse: Elizabeth G. Reade (m. 1878)
- Occupation: Cigar manufacturer, politician

Henry Frederick William Behnsen (March 16, 1852 – March 6, 1938) was a German-born cigar manufacturer and political figure in British Columbia. He represented Victoria City in the Legislative Assembly of British Columbia as a Conservative from 1907 until his retirement at the 1916 provincial election.

He was born in Hanover and was educated there. Behnsen served as a paymaster in the German Army. In 1878, he married Elizabeth G. Reade.

He died in Seattle on March 6, 1938.
