= William Manson =

Canadian politician (1867–1953)

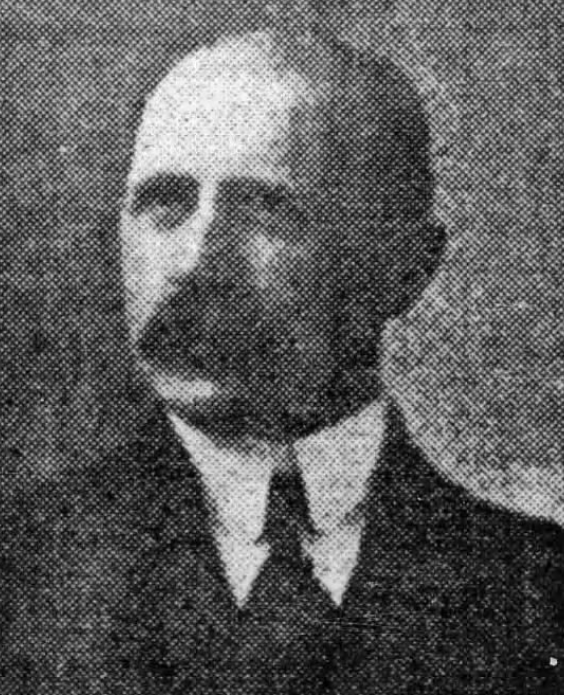

MLA for Alberni
- In office 1905–1907

MLA for Skeena
- In office 1909–1915

Personal details
- Born: July 4, 1867 Shetland Islands, Scotland
- Died: July 24, 1953 (aged 86) New Westminster, British Columbia
- Party: British Columbia Conservative Party

William Manson (July 4, 1867 – July 24, 1953) was a Scottish-born accountant, notary public and political figure in British Columbia, Canada. He represented Alberni from 1905 to 1907 and Skeena from 1909 to 1915 in the Legislative Assembly of British Columbia as a Conservative.

He was born in the Shetland Islands, the son of William Manson, and was educated there. Manson came to British Columbia in 1887, where he was employed as a clerk in a general store in Comox. In 1893, he married Sarah Louise Bennett. He served as a school trustee and a member of the town council for Nanaimo, serving as the town's mayor from 1901 to 1904. Manson was elected to the assembly in a 1905 by-election held after William Wallace Burns McInnes was named Commissioner of the Yukon. He was a member of the province's Executive Council from 1906 to 1907, serving as Provincial Secretary and Minister of Education. He was defeated by future Premier Harlan Carey Brewster when he ran for reelection to the assembly in 1907. He returned to the Legislature in the 1909 election and served until 1916. Between 1915 and 1916, he served as President of the Council and in 1916 he served as Minister of Agriculture. Running in the new riding of Prince Rupert, he was defeated in the 1916 provincial election by future Premier Thomas Pattullo. He died in 1953.
