= William Dalby =

William Dalby may refer to:

- William Dalby (politician) (1839–1916), mayor of Victoria, British Columbia
- William Dalby (engineer) (1862–1936), British engineer
- William Bartlett Dalby (1840–1918), British aural surgeon and otologist
