= Robert Paterson Rithet =

Canadian politician

Robert Paterson Rithet (April 22, 1844 – March 19, 1919) was a Scottish-born businessman and political figure in British Columbia, Canada. He represented Victoria City in the Legislative Assembly of British Columbia from 1894 to 1898. Rithet was mayor of Victoria from 1884 to 1885.

He was born in Cleuchhead near Applegarth in Dumfriesshire, the son of John Rithet, a farmer, and Agnes Paterson, and was educated at Annan. In 1862, Rithet came to Victoria where he prospected for gold and helped build roads in the Cariboo district. He was hired by Gilbert Malcolm Sproat in 1865. In 1870, he moved to J. Robertson Stewart's company; with the help of Andrew Welch, he took over the operation of the business the following year. Rithet married Elizabeth Jane Hannay Munro in 1875. He was vice-president of Albion Iron Works, owned flour mills in Vernon and Enderby, owned large farms and invested in real estate. Rithet served as a justice of the peace and was involved in salmon canning and steamship lines. He also became president of the California and Hawaiian Sugar Refining Company. He died at home in Victoria at the age of 74.
