= Henry Charles Hall =

Canadian politician

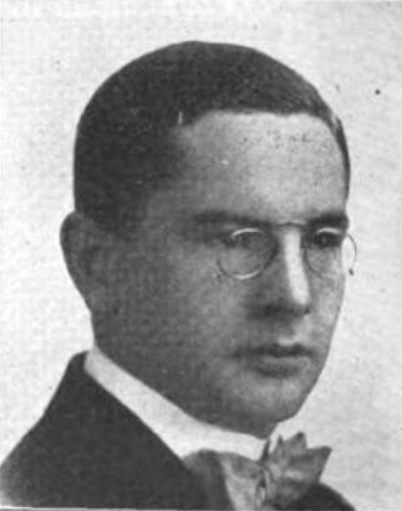

Member of the Legislative Assembly of British Columbia
- In office 1916–1920
- Constituency: Victoria City

Personal details
- Born: November 25, 1883 Detroit, Michigan, U.S.
- Died: February 27, 1962 (aged 78) Victoria, British Columbia
- Party: British Columbia Liberal Party
- Spouse(s): Elena Fernau; Lillian Eleanor Matthews
- Children: 4
- Occupation: Barrister

Henry Charles Hall (November 25, 1883 – February 27, 1962) was a Canadian politician. He served in the Legislative Assembly of British Columbia from 1916 until his defeat in the 1920 provincial election for the electoral district of Victoria City, a member of the Liberal party.
