= Lydia Arsens =

Canadian politician (1906–1983)

MLA for Victoria City
- In office 1953–1956

Personal details
- Born: March 18, 1906 Didsbury, Alberta, Canada
- Died: February 25, 1983 (aged 76)
- Party: Social Credit

Lydia Augusta Arsens (March 18, 1906 – February 25, 1983) was a Canadian politician. She served as MLA for the Victoria City riding in the Legislative Assembly of British Columbia from 1953 to 1956, as a member of the British Columbia Social Credit Party. She was defeated in 1952 in her first attempt at winning the Victoria City riding and then she was defeated when she sought reelection in 1956.
