= George Bell (Canadian politician) =

Canadian politician (1869–1940)

Member of the Legislative Assembly of British Columbia
- In office 1916–1920
- Constituency: Victoria City

Personal details
- Born: December 9, 1869 Markdale, Ontario
- Died: June 9, 1940 (aged 70) Vancouver, British Columbia
- Party: British Columbia Liberal Party
- Spouse: Florence Ann Allan
- Occupation: merchant

George Bell (December 9, 1869 – June 9, 1940) was a Canadian politician. He served in the Legislative Assembly of British Columbia from 1916 until his defeat in the 1920 provincial election, representing the electoral district of Victoria City, as a member of the Liberal party. He previously also served as the mayor of Enderby, British Columbia for 6 years.
