= John Braden (politician) =

Canadian politician

John Braden (June 18, 1841 – December 9, 1926) was an English-born plumber and political figure in British Columbia. He represented Victoria City in the Legislative Assembly of British Columbia from 1894 to 1898. He did not seek a second term to the Legislature in the 1898 provincial election nor again in future elections.

He was born in Liverpool, the son of William Braden, and was educated there. Braden apprenticed as a plumber. He went to Puget Sound in 1871 and then came to the Stickeen country in British Columbia two years later, intending to prospect there. Braden established a plumbing business at Victoria in 1875 with a partner, operating on his own from 1883 until 1887, when he formed a new partnership with Leonard Stamford. He served on the school board and was a member of city council from 1885 to 1887. Braden married a Miss Loveland. He died in Victoria at the age of 85.

He is the Great-Great-Great-grandfather of Victoria broadcaster/ realtor Michael Forbes.
