= George Lawson Milne =

Canadian politician

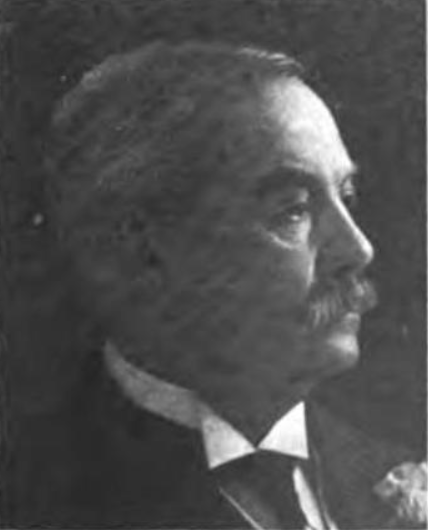

Member of the Legislative Assembly of British Columbia
- In office 1890–1894
- Constituency: Victoria City

Personal details
- Born: April 19, 1850; Garmouth, Scotland
- Died: March 13, 1933 (aged 82); Victoria, British Columbia, Canada
- Spouse: Nellie Kinsman (m. 1882)
- Education: Toronto School of Medicine
- Occupation: Physician, politician

George Lawson Milne (April 19, 1850 – March 13, 1933) was a Scottish-born physician and political figure in British Columbia. He represented Victoria City in the Legislative Assembly of British Columbia from 1890 until his defeat in the 1894 provincial election.

== Biography ==
He was born in Garmouth, Morayshire, came to Canada in 1857 and was educated in Meaford, Ontario and at the Toronto School of Medicine. In 1882, he married Nellie Kinsman. Milne served as Health Officer and as a school trustee for Victoria. He also was federal medical inspector and immigration agent at Victoria and a justice of the peace. He ran unsuccessfully for a seat in the assembly in an 1889 by-election. In 1896, Milne was an unsuccessful candidate for a seat in the Canadian House of Commons. He died in Victoria at the age of 82.
