= Richard Low Drury =

Canadian politician

MLA for Victoria City
- In office 1903–1907

Personal details
- Born: May 2, 1863 Oro Mills, Simcoe County, Canada West
- Died: September 4, 1915 (aged 52) Victoria, British Columbia
- Party: Liberal

Richard Low Drury (May 2, 1863 – September 4, 1915) was a Canadian politician. He served in the Legislative Assembly of British Columbia from 1903 to 1907 for the electoral district of Victoria City, as a Liberal. He was an unsuccessful candidate in both the 1907 and 1909 provincial elections. Drury died in 1915 from the effects of diabetes.
