= William Wilson (British Columbia politician) =

Canadian politician (1838–1922)

William Wilson (1838 – October 27, 1922) was an English-born merchant and political figure in British Columbia. He represented Victoria City in the Legislative Assembly of British Columbia from 1878 to 1882.

Wilson founded the Victoria retail clothing firm of W & J Wilson Ltd. He was also involved in real estate speculation, mining and manufacturing of footwear. Wilson served on the city council for Victoria. He was defeated when he ran for the assembly in 1882. He never sought provincial office again. Wilson died in Victoria at the age of 84.

His grandson Richard B. Wilson later served as mayor of Victoria.
