= James S. Drummond =

Canadian politician (1828–1884)

James Smith Drummond
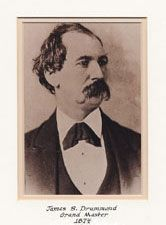

10th mayor of Victoria British Columbia
- Preceded by: William Dalby
- Succeeded by: Montague Tyrwhitt-Drake

James Smith Drummond (October 1828 - February 5, 1884) was the 10th mayor of Victoria, British Columbia.

== Personal life ==
He was born in Scotland and came to Victoria in the 1850s.

He married John Tod's daughter Elizabeth.

== Mayor ==
He was first elected in 1875

Votes:

- James Drummond 299
- Charles Morton 232

Many people, especially Amor de Cosmos, were upset Drummond won because a lot of Chinese people voted for him. All property owners were allowed to vote which in included Chinese, blacks and even women. Three of the voters for Drummond in 1875 were women.

He ran again in 1876 and defeated W.R.Clarke but when he ran in 1877 he was defeated by Montague Tyrwhitt-Drake
