= John Grant (Canadian politician) =

Canadian politician

Mayor of Victoria, British Columbia
- In office 1887–1891
- Preceded by: James Fell
- Succeeded by: Robert Beaven

Personal details
- Born: June 1, 1841 Alford, Scotland
- Died: December 12, 1919 (aged 78) Victoria, British Columbia

John Grant (June 1, 1841 – December 12, 1919) was a Scottish-born merchant and political figure in British Columbia. He represented Cassiar from 1882 to 1890 and Victoria City from 1890 to 1894 in the Legislative Assembly of British Columbia. He did not seek a fourth term in the Legislature in the 1894 provincial election.

He was born in Alford, the eldest son of John Grant, and was educated at Midmar in Aberdeenshire. Grant came to Canada West with his family in 1855. In 1862, he moved to British Columbia from Elora. Grant spent five or six years in the Cariboo District and at the mines on the Peace River. In 1876, he became part of a firm located in Cassiar. Grant was mayor of Victoria from 1887 to 1891. Grant also served as a justice of the peace and a government roads superintendent. Grant died at Victoria in 1919.
