= Joseph Clearihue =

Canadian lawyer, judge, academic and politician (1887-1976)

Joseph Badenoch Clearihue (1887 — August 6, 1976) was a Canadian lawyer, judge, academic and politician.

== Life ==
Clearihue was born in Victoria, British Columbia in 1887. He was educated at Victoria High School before attending Victoria College, British Columbia (a predecessor institution of the University of Victoria) in 1903, where he was one of the first to study at the college. He then attended McGill University before winning a Rhodes Scholarship to the University of Oxford, studying for two years at Jesus College, Oxford, from 1911. During the First World War, Clearihue served with the Fifth Canadian Field Artillery Unit. Thereafter, he worked as a lawyer and served as a Member of the Legislative Assembly of British Columbia when he was elected in 1920 as a member of the British Columbia Liberal Party for Victoria City. He was defeated in both the 1924 and 1933 provincial elections. He was later an alderman for Victoria and a county court judge, becoming chair of the Victoria College Council in 1947 and leading it to the award of university status in 1963. He was the first chancellor for the University and he served as chair of the Board of Governors from 1963 to 1966. The Clearihue building on the University of Victoria campus is named in his honour. Clearihue died in 1976.
