= Henry Dallas Helmcken =

Canadian politician

Henry Dallas "Harry" Helmcken (December 23, 1859 – July 6, 1912) was a lawyer and political figure in British Columbia. He represented Victoria City in the Legislative Assembly of British Columbia from 1894 until his defeat in the 1903 provincial election.

== Biography ==
Helmcken was born in 1859, the son of Cecilia Douglas and John Sebastian Helmcken. His mother was the daughter of Sir James Douglas, and his father was a physician. He was educated at the Nest Academy in Jedburgh, Scotland, the universities of Edinburgh and London and at Osgoode Hall.

In 1895, he married Hannah Jane Goodwin, a widow.

Helmcken was director of the Jubilee Hospital.

In 1909, he ran unsuccessfully in the provincial riding of Esquimalt as a Conservative, and then as an independent Conservative in 1912.
