= James Dugald McNiven =

Canadian politician

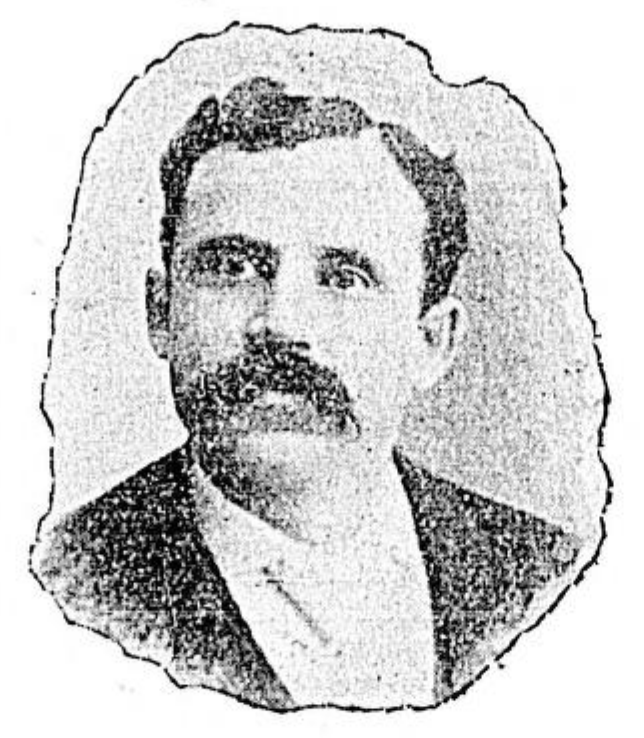

MLA for Victoria City
- In office 1903–1907

Personal details
- Born: March 11, 1859 Bradford, Canada West
- Died: July 17, 1936 (aged 77) Victoria, British Columbia
- Party: Liberal

James Dugald McNiven (March 11, 1859 – July 17, 1936) was a Canadian politician. He served in the Legislative Assembly of British Columbia from 1903 until his defeat in the 1907 provincial election from the electoral district of Victoria City, as a Liberal.
