= Harold Despard Twigg =

Canadian politician

Harold Despard Twigg (April 5, 1876 – November 12, 1946) was an Irish-born lawyer, life insurance agent and political figure in British Columbia. He represented Victoria City in the Legislative Assembly of British Columbia from 1924 to 1933 as a Conservative. Between 1928 and 1933, he served as the deputy speaker of the Legislature. He did not seek a third term in office in the 1933 provincial election.

He was born in Dungannon, County Tyrone, the son of William Twigg and the former Miss Smith, and came to Canada in 1899. He was called to the British Columbia bar in 1903 and set up practice in Victoria. In 1911, Twigg married Marguerite J. Little. Twigg served in the Canadian Expeditionary Force during World War I, achieving the rank of captain. He was a director for the Victoria Chamber of Commerce. He died in Victoria at the age of 70.
