= Daniel John Proudfoot =

Canadian politician

Daniel John Proudfoot (September 21, 1897 – 1972) was a Canadian educator and political figure in British Columbia. Born in England, he fought with the Royal Scots Fusiliers during World War I before emigrating to Canada in 1929. He represented Victoria City in the Legislative Assembly of British Columbia from 1949 to 1953 as a Liberal.

== Early life and education ==
Daniel John Proudfoot was born in Aldershot, the son of James Proudfoot, a native of Scotland and Colour Sergeant of the Royal Scots Fusiliers, who was based in Aldershot Garrison at the time. Daniel was educated in Scotland, at Ayr and Kelvinside whilst his father was based at Ayrshire Barracks. Proudfoot joined the Royal Scots Fusiliers and served during World War I at the rank of Sergeant, by which time his father had also reenlisted, serving as Regimental Sergeant Major. In 1917, Proudfoot married Elizabeth F. McWhitten. He commissioned into the Scottish Rifles in 1918 and retired from the army in 1926 at the rank of Lieutenant, coming to Canada in 1929.

He had two brothers, all serving in the same Regiment. Corporal Thomas George Proudfoot died during the Battle of Arras (1917) during World War I. Sergeant James Proudfoot Jr served with the 11th Battalion and fell during Operation Martlet in the Second World War.

== Career ==
Proudfoot was defeated when he ran for reelection in 1953. He died in Scotland in 1972.
