= James Harry Beatty =

Canadian politician (1890–1966)

MLA for Victoria City
- In office 1928–1933

Personal details
- Born: March 11, 1890 Frankford, Ontario
- Died: February 18, 1966 (aged 75) Victoria, British Columbia
- Party: Conservative

James Harry Beatty (March 11, 1890 – February 18, 1966) was a Canadian politician. He served in the Legislative Assembly of British Columbia from 1928 until his retirement at the 1933 election, from the electoral district of Victoria City, as a Conservative.
