= William Thomas Straith =

Canadian politician

MLA for Victoria City
- In office 1937–1953

Personal details
- Born: August 5, 1894 Innerkip, Ontario, Canada
- Died: March 27, 1980 (aged 85) Victoria, British Columbia, Canada
- Party: British Columbia Liberal Party

William Thomas Straith (August 5, 1894 – March 27, 1980) was a lawyer and political figure in British Columbia. He represented Victoria City in the Legislative Assembly of British Columbia from 1937 to 1953 as a Liberal.

He was born in Innerkip, Ontario, in 1894, the son of Reverend Peter Straith and Janet Martin, and was educated in Mount Forest and at the University of Manitoba. Straith was called to the British Columbia bar in 1922. In 1924, he married Alice Mae Stokes. Straith was an alderman for Victoria City Council from 1928 to 1931 and in 1935. He ran unsuccessfully for a seat in the assembly in 1928. Straith served in the provincial cabinet as Minister of Education from 1947 to 1952 and as Provincial Secretary from 1950 to 1952. In 1939, he co-founded the legal firm Straith Pringle & Ruttan. After he left politics, Straith continued to practise law until his death in 1980.
