= Simeon Duck =

Canadian politician

Simeon Duck (December 1, 1834 – February 5, 1905) was a businessman and political figure in British Columbia. He represented Victoria City in the Legislative Assembly of British Columbia from 1871 to 1875, from 1882 to 1886 and from 1888 to 1890.

He was born in St. Catharines, Ontario, the son of William Duck and Mary Jackson, and left Ontario in 1859, arriving in British Columbia later that year by way of Panama. After his arrival, Duck worked a claim in the mines on the Fraser River. In the fall of that year, he established a wagon and carriage factory in Victoria. In 1865, he married Sarah Miller. Duck was defeated when he ran for reelection to the assembly in 1875 and again in an 1876 byelection. He served in the provincial cabinet as Minister of Finance and Agriculture from March 1885 to October 1886. Duck was defeated when he ran for reelection in 1886 but was reelected in an 1888 by-election held after Edward Gawler Prior was elected to the Canadian House of Commons. He was defeated when he ran for reelection in 1890. Duck was a member of the Victoria volunteer fire department, serving in various positions including chief engineer. He was also a prominent member of the local Masonic lodge and was provincial grand master from 1874 to 1875. He died in Victoria at the age of 70.
