= Reginald Hayward (politician) =

Canadian politician (1880–1961)

Reginald Hayward (May 2, 1880 – November 15, 1961) was a funeral director and political figure in British Columbia. He represented Victoria City in the Legislative Assembly of British Columbia from 1924 to 1933 as a Conservative. Hayward was Mayor of Victoria from 1922 to 1924.

He was born in Victoria, the son of Charles Hayward. In 1908, he took over the operation of the B.C. Funeral Company, a business established by his father. Hayward was a school trustee and city alderman before becoming mayor. He married Isabella Morrison Jaffrey. Hayward was an unsuccessful candidate for a seat in the assembly in 1916. He was defeated when he ran for reelection in 1933. He died in 1961 in Victoria.
