= Richard Hall (politician) =

Canadian politician

MLA for Victoria City
- In office 1898–1907

Personal details
- Born: April 30, 1855 San Francisco, California, United States
- Died: March 29, 1918 (aged 62) Victoria, British Columbia, Canada
- Party: Liberal

Richard Hall (April 30, 1855 – March 29, 1918) was an American-born insurance agent, wholesale coal merchant and political figure in British Columbia. He represented Victoria City in the Legislative Assembly of British Columbia from 1898 to 1907, the latter years as a Liberal. On January 11, 1899 he resigned his seat in the Legislature because of the sale of coal to Government House but he was reelected in a February 2, 1899 byelection.

He was born in San Francisco, the son of Richard Hall and Sarah Dunderdale, who were both natives of Lancashire, England. Hall was educated in Victoria, British Columbia. For a time, he worked in the dry goods trade and then as a purser on a steamboat. Hall entered the wholesale coal trade in 1882. He was also president of the Victoria Sealing Company. In 1887, Hall married Louisa Kinsman. He was defeated when he ran for reelection to the assembly in 1907. Hall died in Victoria.
