= Joshua Hinchcliffe =

Canadian politician

Joshua Hinchcliffe (May 24, 1868 – 1954) was an English-born Anglican clergyman and political figure in British Columbia. He represented Victoria City in the Legislative Assembly of British Columbia from 1920 to 1933 as a Conservative.

He was born in Bradford, UK, the son of Thomas Hinchcliffe and Mary H. Gibbons, and came to Canada in 1890. He was educated at St. John's College in Winnipeg. Hinchcliffe was named the first rector of St. Luke's Anglican Church in Red Deer, Alberta in 1899. He was also an architect, master stonemason and carpenter; he drew up plans for the church and supervised most of the construction. Hinchcliffe was married twice: first to Mary A. Mason in 1890 and then to Jessie H. Tilston in 1916. He served as a chaplain in the Canadian Expeditionary Force. Hinchcliffe was Minister of Education (1928 to 1933) and later Minister of Lands (1933) in the provincial cabinet. He was an unsuccessful candidate in the North Vancouver riding in the 1941 provincial election. He died in 1954.
