= Joseph Douglas Hunter =

Canadian politician

Member of the Legislative Assembly of British Columbia
- In office 1937–1941
- Constituency: Victoria City

Personal details
- Born: August 27, 1881 New Westminster, British Columbia, Canada
- Died: September 16, 1970 (aged 89) Victoria, British Columbia
- Party: British Columbia Conservative Party
- Spouse: Anita Bruce
- Children: 1
- Occupation: physician

Joseph Douglas Hunter (August 27, 1881 – September 16, 1970) was a Canadian politician. He served in the Legislative Assembly of British Columbia from 1937 until his defeat in the 1941 provincial election, from the electoral district of Victoria City, a member of the Conservative party.
