= Montague Tyrwhitt-Drake =

Canadian politician

Montague William Tyrwhitt-Drake (January 20, 1830 – April 19, 1908) was an English-born lawyer, judge and political figure in British Columbia, Canada. Tyrwhitt-Drake represented Victoria City in the Legislative Assembly of British Columbia from 1882 to 1886.

== Career ==
He was born in King's Walden, Hertfordshire, the son of the Reverend George Tyrwhitt-Drake, and was admitted to practice in England in 1851. Tyrwhitt-Drake came to British Columbia in 1863, settling in Victoria. He represented Victoria in the Legislative Council of British Columbia from 1868 to 1870. From 1872 to 1879, he served as a member of the Board of Education for British Columbia. He was called to the British Columbia bar in 1877. Tyrwhitt-Drake was mayor of Victoria from 1876 to 1877. He served as a member of the province's Executive Council from 1882 to 1884. In 1883, he was named Queen's Counsel. Tyrwhitt-Drake was Treasurer (chief elected officer) of the Law Society of British Columbia from 1884 to 1889. He served as justice in the Supreme Court of British Columbia from 1889 to 1904. Tyrwhitt-Drake died in Victoria at the age of 78.

== Family ==
Tyrwhitt-Drake married in 1862 Joanna Tolmie. They had several children, including:

- (third daughter) Mildred Jane Tyrwhitt-Drake, who married in Berkhamsted on 10 September 1902 Geoffry Barnardiston, son of Colonel Nathaniel Barnardiston and his wife Lady Florence Legge, daughter of William Legge, 4th Earl of Dartmouth.
