= British Columbia Archives =

History museum and archives in British Columbia, Canada

- Established: 1894
- Location: Victoria, British Columbia, Canada.
- Type: provincial history museum and archives
- Public transit access: bus routes 3 27 27x 28 30 31 S
- Website: http://www.royalbcmuseum.bc.ca

The British Columbia Provincial Archives are located in Victoria, British Columbia, Canada. The BC Archives merged with the Royal BC Museum in 2003. The BC Archives contain the archives of the British Columbia government, and are valuable for both research and preservation activities. The BC archives have been archiving significant artifacts, documents, and records since 1894, including private historical manuscripts, maps, and government records. There is also a research library in the archives. Of note, the BC Archives website contains research guides to assist those interested in the material they house.

== Holdings ==
The BC Archives house the Douglas Treaties (1850-1854), the treaties signed between certain First Nations groups and the Colony of Vancouver Island in the nineteenth century. The archives also preserve BC Provincial Police correspondence records, Executive council of BC records, documentation of the dispersal of Crown Land in British Columbia 1874-1944, the Premier's Papers, and the James Douglas Papers. Furthermore, the BC Archives contain documents concerning prominent Canadian persons including Nellie McClung, JS Helmcken, and Emily Carr. Also included in the archives are papers concerning the Trutch family, Ida Halpern, Clement Francis Cornwall, and BC premiers Dave Barrett and Thomas Dufferin Pattullo.

=== Sisters of St. Ann Archives ===
In the spring of 2012, the Sisters of St. Ann announced the decision to place their collection of historical and religious artifacts and documents under the stewardship of the Royal BC Museum. Their collection dates back to 1858, and includes over 100 000 photographs, 500 pieces of art, and 1 000 000 archival records. Since the mid-nineteenth century, The Sisters of St. Ann have opened thirteen schools, nine hospitals, numerous parochial schools, and one nursing school in BC, the Yukon, and Alaska. Among other significant artifacts, their collection includes large hand-carved rosaries worn by the Sisters, liturgical objects used during mass, vintage textiles, and historic letters.

=== Pemberton Holmes Business Archives ===
In the autumn of 2012, long time Victoria real estate company Pemberton Holmes donated their business archives to the BC archives for preservation and stewardship. Pemberton Holmes was founded in 1887 by Joseph Despard Pemberton, the first colonial land surveyor in Victoria, and his son Frederick Barnard Pemberton. The donated archives date from the 1880s and include thousands of documents that serve as historical sources about the early development of BC and Victoria. The collection comprises more than 2400 individual client dockets or files containing business transactions and correspondences; 300 photographs; 40 maps and plans; 180 bound volumes of correspondence; original watercolour architectural drawings for commercial buildings in Victoria's Old Town; and other historic real estate memorabilia.

== Archivists ==
The position of Provincial Archivist was created in 1908, and dissolved in 2014.

=== Former Provincial Archivists ===
- 1908–1909 R.E. Gosnell
- 1910–1919 Ethelbert O.S. Scholefield
- 1920-1925 John Forsyth
- 1926-1934 John Hosie
- 1934-1940 William Kaye Lamb
- 1940-1970 Willard Ireland
- 1974-1979 Allan R. Turner
- 1979-1998 John A. Bovey
- 1998-2014 Gary A. Mitchell
