= 1863 Colony of Vancouver Island election =

British colonial election in North America

A total of 15 members were elected to the Third House of Assembly of Vancouver Island which ruled from September 2, 1863, to August 31, 1866. This was the last parliament for an independent Colony of Vancouver Island before unification with the colony of British Columbia.

== Constituencies ==
- Victoria City 4 members to be elected

William Alexander George Young 229 He resigned and was replaced by Charles Bedford Young October 25, 1864, who then resigned and replaced by Leonard McClure February 14, 1865.
Amor De Cosmos 211
Israel Wood Powell 203
Joseph Charles Ridge 183. He resigned and was replaced by Selim Franklin on February 1, 1864, who then resigned and was replaced by Charles Bedford Young on May 2, 1866.
Semlin Franklin 133
Pidwell 91

- Victoria District 3 to be elected

Edward Henry Jackson 60. He resigned and was replaced by James Dickson on September 22, 1864.
William Fraser Tolmie 60
James Trimble 57
Mr Elliott 28

- Esquimalt Town

George Foster Foster 22. He resigned and was replaced by Joseph Johnson Southgate on September 22, 1864, who then resigned and was replaced by Edward Stamp on May 18, 1866.
Mr Cocker 14

- Esquimalt and Metchosin 2 to be elected

John Sebastian Helmcken elected by acclamation
Robert Burnaby elected by acclamation who resigned and was replaced by John Ash on November 28, 1865.

- Lake District

James Duncan elected by acclamation.

- Saanich District

Charles Street elected by acclamation. He resigned and was replaced by John James Cochrane on November 2, 1864.

- Saltspring Island and Chemainus

John Trevasso Pidwell He resigned and was replaced by George Edgar Dennes on October 13, 1863, who then resigned and was replaced by John Trevasso Pidwell on May 30, 1866.
G.E.Dennes (he seems to have received more votes than Pidwell but seems to have been disqualified)

- Nanaimo (vote totals were not reported in the paper)

Charles Alfred Bayley He resigned and was replaced by Thomas Cunningham on January 5, 1866.
David Babington Ring

- Sooke

James Carswell elected by acclamation
