= George Hunter Cary =

British colonial official (1832–1866)

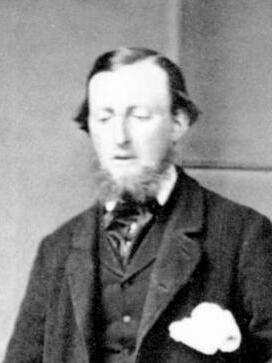
- Cary, c. 1860

Attorney General of British Columbia
- In office 1859–1861
- Governor: James Douglas

Attorney General of Vancouver Island
- In office 1859–1864
- Governor: James Douglas

Member of the Vancouver Island Legislative Assembly for Victoria Town
- In office 1860–1863

Personal details
- Born: 16 January 1832 Woodford, Essex, England
- Died: 16 July 1866 (aged 34) London, England
- Spouse: Ellen Martin (m. 1858)
- Education: King's College London

George Hunter Cary (16 January 1832 – 16 July 1866) was an English barrister and colonial official.

Born in Essex, he studied law in London, and was recommended for a colonial posting by a family friend. Arriving in British Columbia in 1859, he served as its first Attorney General until 1861, as well as Attorney General of Vancouver Island and later as a member of the Legislative Assembly of Vancouver Island for the constituency of Victoria Town. Cary was noted for his advocacy and implementation of the Torrens land title system in British Columbia, as well as for his eccentricity and tendency for physical altercations with his political and legal opponents.

He engaged in several ill-fated business ventures, including an unsuccessful purchase of Victoria's water supply and investment into two road construction projects in the rural mainland; one was liquidated after he was accused of illegal land speculation, while the other drew later allegations of biological warfare against the First Nations during the 1862 smallpox epidemic. His mental condition continued to deteriorate after leaving office in 1864. He became financially destitute after the construction of his ornate mansion, Cary Castle, and failed investments in the Cariboo Gold Rush. After his clerk witnessed several bouts of absurd behaviour from Cary in 1865, he was tricked into returning to London via a forged notification that he had been appointed Lord Chancellor. He died of a suspected stroke or heart failure soon after.

== Early life ==
George Hunter Cary was born in Woodford, an Essex suburb of London, on 16 January 1832. He was the eldest of the ten children of the surgeon William Henry Cary and Elizabeth Malins. Cary attended St Paul's School, then studied law at King's College London. On 13 June 1854, he became a barrister and was called to the bar at the Inner Temple. He later transferred to Lincoln's Inn, where practiced in the equity courts. He married Ellen Martin on 6 November 1858.

After a 1858 gold rush, colonial secretary Edward Bulwer-Lytton searched for British lawyers to be sent to administer the newly founded Colony of British Columbia. Hugh McCalmont Cairns recommended Cary, as he had been one of Cary's instructors. Cairns informed Cary of the recent proposals for the Torrens title system in the Province of South Australia and advocated that it be implemented in British Columbia. Under the system, legal land ownership would be validated by a public register, avoiding the pitfalls of earlier deeds systems, in which land ownership could be invalidated by the discovery of prior legal error or fraud in the chain of title. Cary was appointed Attorney General of British Columbia and arrived in Victoria on 16 May 1859.

== Political career ==
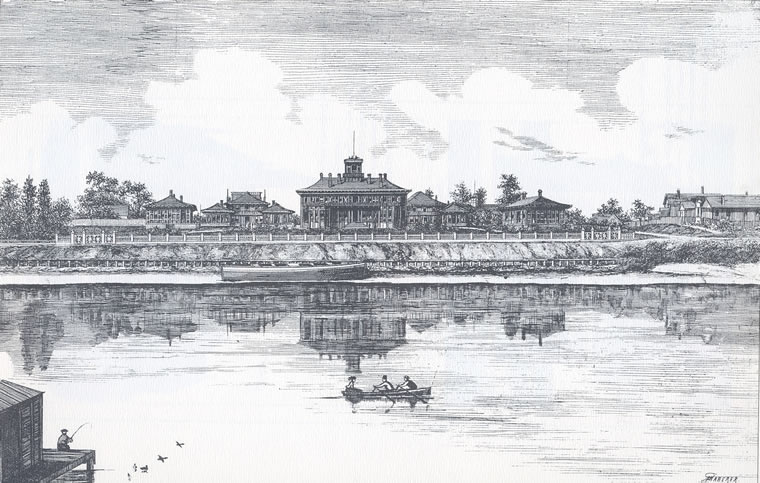
1876 depiction of the former government buildings of the Colony of Vancouver Island, including the legislative assembly hall

While the Colony of British Columbia was administered from New Westminster on the Lower Mainland, Cary stayed on Vancouver Island during his service as Attorney General. In August 1859, the Governor James Douglas appointed Cary as acting attorney general of Vancouver Island, albeit at no additional salary.

A week after being appointed acting attorney general in August 1859, Cary announced his candidacy for the Victoria Town seat in the second Vancouver Island Legislative Assembly elections. He ran against Amor De Cosmos, a staunch opponent of Douglas and chief editor of the British Colonist. Cary promised the city's relatively large Black American population, invited to Victoria under Douglas's protection, that they would be able to vote in the election if they owned property; Cary reasoned that since they were not recognized as citizens in the United States, they would qualify as British subjects. Cary's promise was contrary to the law in the colony at that time, but many Black voters turned out in favour of Douglas and Cary, potentially swinging the Assembly race in his favour, subjecting his victory to allegations of fraud. Cary also served as the de facto finance minister of Vancouver Island from 1860 to 1863 and the acting registrar of Joint-Stock Companies after establishing a regulation board in 1860.

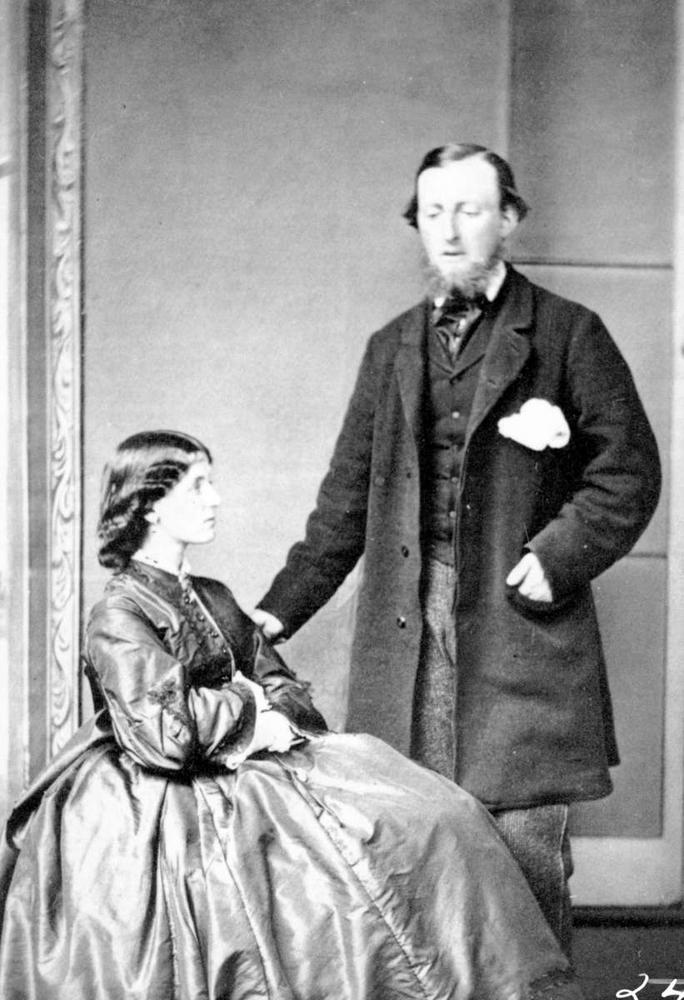
Cary and his wife Ellen, c. 1860

Cary pushed for the implementation of the Torrens system. An article advocating for the Torrens system was published in the Colonist on 10 June 1859, possibly due to his influence. A long period of legislative discussion resulted in the Land Registry Act 1860, which received royal assent the following January and implemented throughout 1861. Portions of the text of the Land Registry Act resembled the South Australian Real Property Act; since the South Australian version received royal assent in October 1860, the version implemented in Vancouver Island was probably based on an 1858 draft. Cary probably obtained a copy of the draft from a local politician with connections to politics in the Australian colonies; the jurist John Foster McCreight was a likely candidate, as he had practised law in Victoria, Australia.

Cary was disliked by many colonists, who considered him vain and eccentric. He was dubbed the "Boy-Attorney-General" by the British Colonist. He had a reputation for physical fights with opponents, including court defendants. Soon after his arrival in Victoria, he was arrested for "riding furiously" across the James Bay Bridge. In 1859, he entered a conflict with David Babington Ring, a local politician. They had frequently argued during legislative sessions, and were described by the British Colonist as once "very [nearly] spitting at each other". In October, Ring called Cary a slanderer and coward and challenged him to a duel on nearby San Juan Island. Cary was arrested for breach of the peace soon afterwards and denied accepting the challenge, but was convicted "on notoriety". Unwilling to post bond, he was sentenced to a year's imprisonment but released on a technicality soon afterwards. The trader Donald Maculay challenged Ring to a duel due to his alleged "stigmatisation" of Cary; Ring ignored the challenge.

In 1860, Cary put forward an affidavit alleging that George W. Heaton, the first sheriff of Vancouver Island, had allowed a debtor to escape custody. Heaton resigned shortly before his arrest and returned to England soon after. Douglas described Cary as "excitable and overbearing" to such an extent that it detracted from his skill as an administrator. Despite his tendency towards physical combat, he was regarded as intelligent and a skilled speaker. He was able to get much legislation through the 2nd Vancouver Island Assembly, in stark contrast to the deadlocked assembly which followed. In 1861, the Colonial Office required the officials of the British Columbia colony to live within the colony itself; Cary resigned his mainland post in favour of his role as Attorney General of Vancouver Island. Douglas appointed Henry Pering Pellew Crease to fill the resulting vacancy.

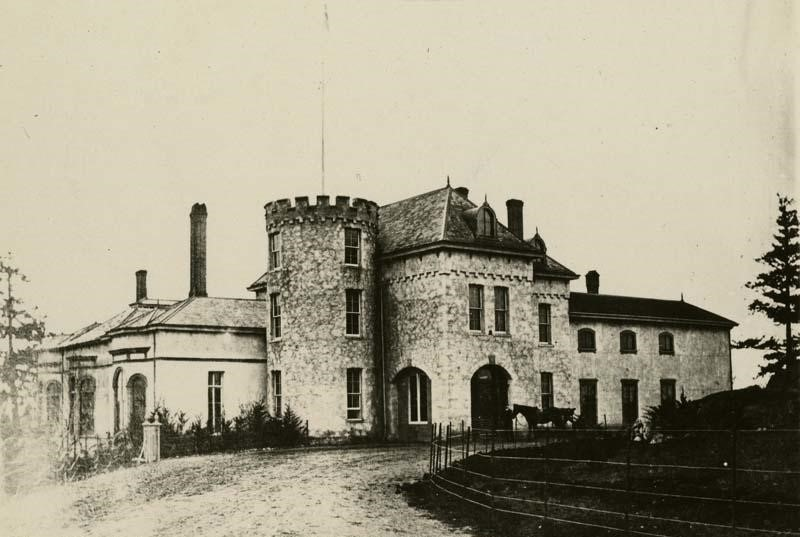
Cary Castle, 1884

In 1862, he began to practise law on the Mainland. He made regular legal trips to New Westminster and he journeyed into the Interior, traveling to the settlements of Lytton and Lillooet. On one trip to Lillooet, he was forced to halt at Port Douglas due to worsening eye inflammation (likely iritis) and returned home; this condition affected him for the rest of his life. Cary was bitterly opposed by some parties in New Westminster, who constructed and burned effigies of him before ceremonially drowning the ashes. Cary introduced the Act of Incorporation of the Town of Victoria, and it was enacted in August 1862. The legislation lacked provisions for the town to levy taxes, which would only be implemented upon revision in 1867.

Cary declined to run in the 1863 Vancouver Island Legislative Assembly elections; he may have considered electoral success unlikely due to his reputation. He continued on in his role as Attorney General. Cary's hostility towards de Cosmos delayed the passage of his Legal Professions Act, 1865, which allowed lawyers from other British colonies to become members of the Vancouver Island bar. The act would pass after Cary's resignation.

In 1864, Douglas was succeeded as governor of Vancouver Island by Arthur Edward Kennedy. After an audit, Kennedy accused Cary of corruption, including charging the government excessive fees for his services. Cary did not make any public response to these allegations. After being advised by Kennedy that he should resign as Attorney General, Cary wrote to the Executive Council that he was "declining to act any further for the Crown in cases where counsel is required." This was taken as a resignation statement, but Cary wrote to Kennedy that he had no intentions to resign. He then resigned shortly afterwards without further statements. The Colonist reported his resignation with hopes that his replacement would be "a gentleman of integrity, ability and colonial experience, qualities that unfortunately have been 'conspicuous in their absence'". The New Westminster–based British Columbian merely stated that Cary had resigned in a one-sentence column titled "A Good Riddance".

== Business ventures ==
Cary bought large amounts of land across the colony. By 1861, he had acquired about 400 acres (160 ha) of property spread across North Saanich, Victoria, and Thetis Cove in what is now View Royal, and 1,400 acres (570 ha) on Sidney Island. Adjacent to the eastern city limits of Victoria, he leased an additional 10 hectares (25 acres). In Victoria, he began the construction of an extravagant residence dubbed Cary Castle, overlooking the Strait of Juan de Fuca. He attracted controversy in 1860 when agreed to purchase the city's water supply from the Hudson's Bay Company. A surveyor named John J. Cochrane served as the public face for Cary's efforts, and Cochrane erected fences around the spring and charged for water. The Hudson's Bay Company ultimately cancelled the sale and Cary was labelled the "Water Monopolist" by the Colonist.

=== Bentinck Arm Road and biological warfare accusations ===
In 1862, Cary became a legal advisor and partner to the Bentinck Arm and Fraser River Company, organized to build the Bentinck Arm Road, a toll road connecting Bella Coola and the Fraser River, a common route for participants in the Cariboo gold rush. This region had been devastated by the 1862 Pacific Northwest smallpox epidemic, killing the vast majority of the Nuxalk and Tsilhqotʼin. The Canadian scholar Shawn Swanky accused Cary of biological warfare in his self-published 2016 book The Smallpox War in Nuxalk Territory, writing that Cary purposefully spread smallpox into the region through infected agents to depopulate the local First Nations and allow for road construction. Swanky's arguments have seen support from the modern Nuxalk Nation; while colonists did spread smallpox through the region, other historians such as Robin Fisher have disputed the actions as being part of an intentional campaign, and stated that there is no direct evidence that Cary spread smallpox deliberately.

Cary became an associate of another road project through the Bute Inlet Company. Douglas considered Cary's actions in violation of an 1853 law against land speculation and reprimanded him. Cary withdrew from the company, and the company was liquidated by its shareholders in early 1864.

=== Cariboo investments ===
During the 1863 election season, Cary was granted permission to take a three-month vacation to the Cariboo in northern British Columbia, ostensibly for his mental health. Edward Graham Alston, another Vancouver Island politician, instead stated that Cary had intended the trip as a money-making opportunity from the outset. Cary invested in the Cariboo-based Never Sweat Mine Company. Visiting the mine himself, he panned gravel and found large quantities of gold. Seeing the mine as especially fruitful, he encouraged his friends to invest in the company. However, rumours quickly spread that the gravel had been salted by the mine owners, who had placed gold there before Cary's visit. The Cariboo Sentinel questioned Cary's optimism, stating that "the best miners are puzzled" at his investments. The mine operated with only minor difficulties over the following year, yielding a decent profit. However, a heavy freshet flooded the mine and caused a devastating cave-in. Despite efforts to maintain his holdings, Cary ultimately lost his stake in the mine and went bankrupt.

== Mental health decline and death ==
More financial irregularities and evidence of embezzlement emerged after Cary left office. The Executive Council noted a large deficit between the amount of money Cary had received in his duties as registrar and how much had entered the treasury; after he was ordered to pay the difference, he hired the politician Montague Tyrwhitt-Drake as his defence lawyer, although no formal proceedings ever emerged.

Cary's eccentricities and mental health entered a steep decline. Despite this and his legal issues, he continued working and participating in civic life. In 1864, he served on an organising committee for a Queen's Birthday ball held at the General Assembly. However, his failed investments had led him to financial difficulties, and he was forced to sell Cary Castle that year. The building would eventually become British Columbia's Government House.

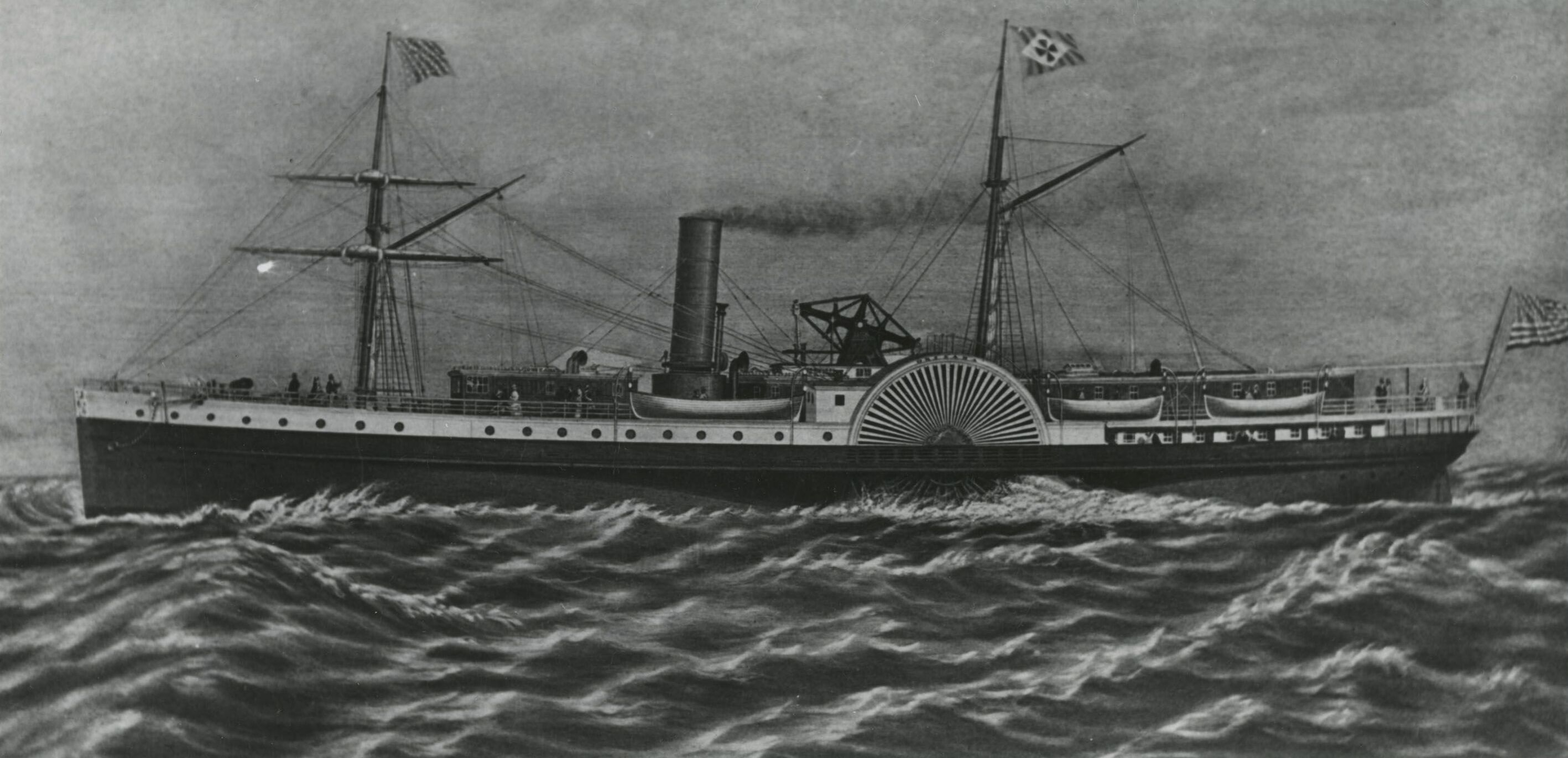
Cary left the colonies aboard the Orizaba.

His mental condition began to strongly effect his personal life in 1865. His clerk and relative Arthur Stanhope Farwell witnessed him perform eccentric actions, such as sowing crops in a field at midnight by candlelight, speaking nonsense, and collecting bones and mushrooms to produce tooth powder. Despite this, Cary continued to practise law. He was declared insane by John Ash, a physician and politician who may have initially treated Cary's vision problems.

Cary and his wife had discussed returning to England for several months, although he abruptly changed his mind and announced his plans to move to the Kootenays in early 1865. A group of acquaintances, including Farwell and Dr. John Sebastian Helmcken, tricked Cary into returning to England, forging a telegram which announced he had been appointed Lord Chancellor at a highly inflated salary. He left Victoria with his wife aboard the Orizaba on 16 September 1865. The politician Robert Burnaby also accompanied Cary, probably to ensure his stability on board the ship.

After returning to England, Cary stayed in London with his aunt and younger brother, who served as his caretaker. There, he died suddenly on 16 July 1866 of what an obituary in The Gentleman's Magazine described as "paralysis of the brain, caused by over exertion". This may have been due to a stroke or heart failure, possibly exacerbated by the long-term effects of rheumatism. An obituary published in the British Colonist described Cary as having a "sometimes irritating temperament towards his opponents", but stated that he would have "advanced far beyond most men of his age" were it not for his mental health issues. The obituary published in The Gentleman's Magazine described Cary as having "possessed great talent and ability".
