= 1856 Vancouver Island election =

British colonial election in North America

Members elected to the First House of Assembly of Vancouver Island which sat from August 12, 1856, to December 7, 1859. The election was two years before the first newspaper started so there is no known record of the vote totals.

This was not a free election. There were property qualifications for candidates (to run, you had to have at least 300 pounds of freehold land) and for voters (to vote, you had to own at least 20 acres).

Only 40 could vote In the whole colony.

A mix of multi-member districts and single-member districts:

Victoria 3 members

Esquimalt 2 members

Sooke 1 member

Nanaimo 1 member.

Likely block voting was used in the multi-member districts and first-past-the-post voting in the single member districts, if a vote was held at all.

== Constituency ==
Victoria District

- Edward Edwards Langford – election contested and he was removed 26 August 1856 and replaced by Joseph William McKay on December 3, 1856
- Joseph Despard Pemberton
- James Yates

Esquimalt District

- John Sebastian Helmcken, Speaker
- Thomas James Skinner

Sooke District

- John Muir, resigned 5 May 1857

Nanaimo District

- Dr. John Frederick Kennedy
