= Legislative Council of British Columbia =

Legislature of British Columbia (1867–1871)

Type
- Type: Unicameral house of the Governor-in-Council of the Colony of British Columbia

History
- Founded: 1867
- Disbanded: 1871
- Preceded by: Legislative Assembly of Vancouver Island; Colonial Assembly of British Columbia
- Succeeded by: Legislative Assembly of British Columbia

Meeting place
- Legislative Hall

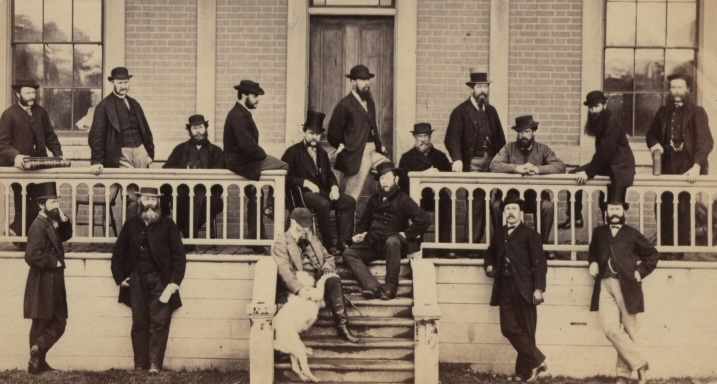
A group of members of the Legislative Council, circa 1867

The Legislative Council of British Columbia was created in 1867 for the governor of the new Colony of British Columbia (which was the merger of the colony of Vancouver Island and the former colony of British Columbia). The merged colony had not theretofore had a responsible government, and its executive power was only its governor, who at the time of its Legislative Assembly's founding was Frederick Seymour.

There were three groups of members: five senior officials of the colony who constituted its executive council; nine magistrates (some of whom had been elevated to that post to please Whitehall); and nine elected members (who represented two seats in Victoria, one in Greater Victoria or "Victoria District", New Westminster, Columbia River and Kootenay, Nanaimo, Yale and Lytton, Lillooet, and Cariboo).

== Initial composition ==
At the time of the council's creation, its members were:

Executive Council
Name	Position	First appointed	Term number
Arthur N. Birch	Colonial Secretary	1866	1
H. P. P. Crease	Attorney-General	1866	1
George Phillippo	Attorney-General	1870	1
W. A. G. Young	Acting Treasurer	1866	1
Joseph W. Trutch	Chief Commissioner of Lands and Works	1866	1
Wymond Ogilvy Hamley	Collector of Customs	1866	1
Magistrates
Name	Position	First appointed	Term number
Thomas L. Wood	Acting Solicitor-General	1866	1
Henry Maynard Ball	Magistrate, Cariboo West	1866	1
Chartres Brew	Magistrate, New Westminster	1866	1
C. F. Cornwall	Magistrate, Thompson River District	1866	1
W. G. Cox	Magistrate, Cariboo East	1866	1
W.J. Macdonald	Magistrate, Victoria	1866	1
C. S. Nicol	Magistrate, Nanaimo	1866	1
Peter O'Reilly	Magistrate, Kootenay	1866	1
E. H. Sanders	Magistrate, Yale and Lytton	1866	1
Elected Members
Name	Representation	First elected	Term number
G. A. Walkem	Cariboo	1866	1
R. T. Smith	Columbia River and Kootenay	1866	1
Edward Stamp	Lillooet	1866	1
J. J. Southgate	Nanaimo	1866	1
John Robson	New Westminster	1866	1
Amor de Cosmos	Victoria	1866	1
J. S. Helmcken	Victoria	1866	1
Joseph D. Pemberton	Victoria	1866	1
George Wallace	Yale and Lytton	1866	1
F.J. Barnard (1866)	Yale and Lytton	1866	1

- Elected members were actually appointed by the governor and not mandated by their election, but appointed "in deference to the wishes of the people". George Wallace, the representative for Yale and Lytton, resigned his seat before the first session and a by-election was held which selected F.J. Barnard as his replacement. All members, including elected ones, had the right to use "the Honourable" before their name.

The council was abolished in 1871 when British Columbia became a province.

== See also ==
- Colony of British Columbia (1866–1871)
- Executive Council of British Columbia
- Legislative Assembly of British Columbia
