= Legislative Assembly of Vancouver Island =

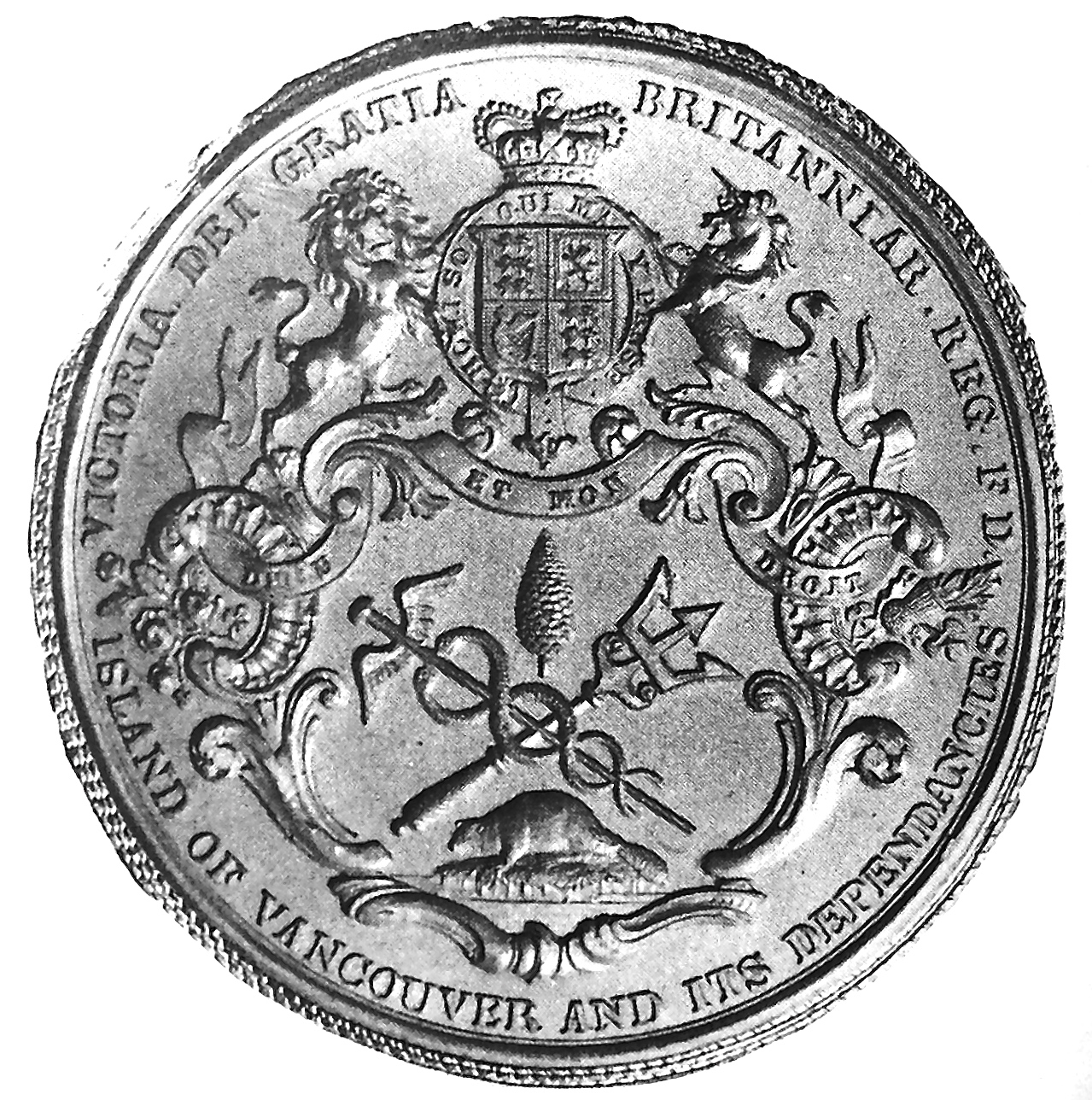

Type
- Type: Unicameral

History
- Founded: 1856
- Disbanded: 1866
- Preceded by: none
- Succeeded by: Legislative Council of British Columbia

Leadership
- Speaker of the House of Assembly: John Sebastian Helmcken

Meeting place
- Bachelor's Hall, Fort Victoria 1856–1860
- Legislative Hall / Legislative Council Court 1860–1866

The Legislative Assembly of Vancouver Island, sometimes House of Assembly of Vancouver Island, was the colonial parliamentary body that was elected to represent voters in the Colony of Vancouver Island. It was created in 1856 after a series of petitions were sent to the Colonial Office in London protesting the Hudson's Bay Company's proprietary rule over the colony. It was the first elected assembly in British North America west of Ontario.

Although at first only handful of colonists met the voting requirement, and most of those that did were tied to the HBC, the franchise was gradually extended, and the assembly began to assert demands for more control over colonial affairs, as well as criticize colonial governor Sir James Douglas's inherent conflict of interest as both governor and Hudson Bay Company's chief factor.

== History ==
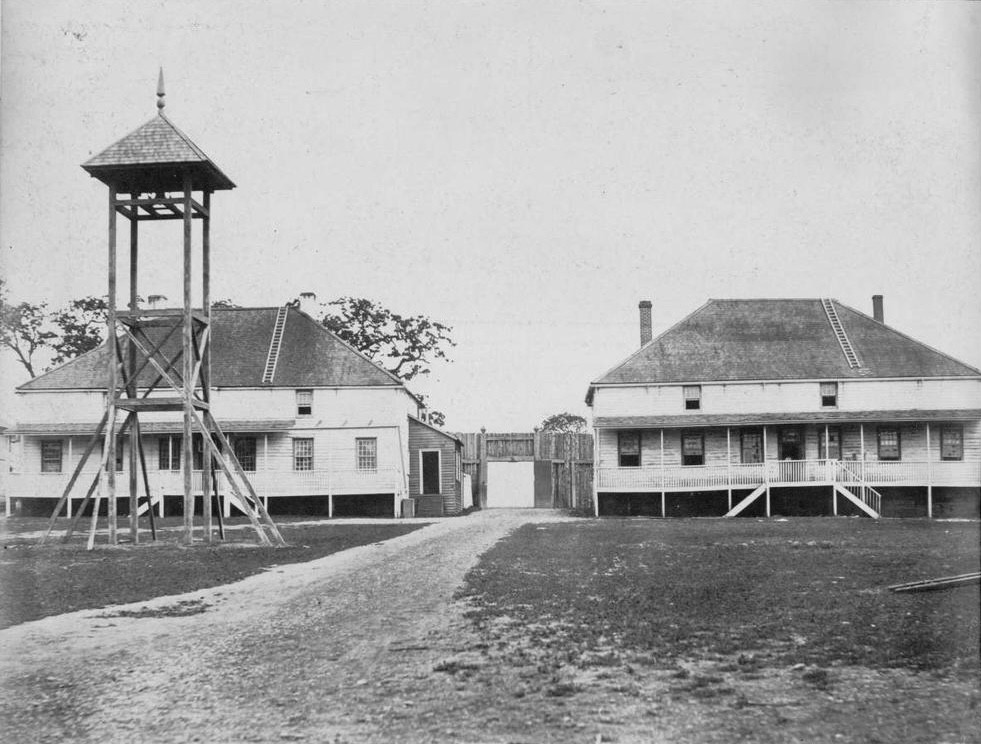
The first House of Assembly of Vancouver Island was sworn in at the "bachelor's mess" (visible on the left) in Fort Victoria

In an attempt to minimize the influence of the assembly he had been ordered to establish, Governor James Douglas, who described himself as "utterly averse to universal suffrage, or making population the basis of representation," set an unusually high property requirement of 20 acres (81,000 m^{2}) for voters.

At first the island was divided into four districts, and the assembly consisted of eight members: one from each of Nanaimo and Sooke, two from Esquimalt, two from Metchosin and three from Victoria. In the election on July 22, 1856, Victoria, which had the greatest number of qualified voters at five, was the only district contested.

The 1860 election used nine districts with the Victoria Town having two members and Victoria District having three members.

The 1863 election also used nine districts but Victoria city had four and Victoria District had three members.

The power of the Assembly was severely limited. Despite the protests of newspapermen such as Amor de Cosmos, Douglas appointed the members of his government according to his own agenda, regardless of who dominated the Assembly. The governor also maintained control over the legislative process through the Legislative Council, an upper house of a sort that had its members appointed directly. However, the Assembly did have one significant power: it had to approve any use of public funds.

The colonies of Vancouver Island and British Columbia were joined into a new single colony, the Colony of British Columbia, in 1866, and the Legislative Assembly of Vancouver Island ceased to exist. Its role was filled in the new colony by the Legislative Council of British Columbia.

== Leaders and parties ==
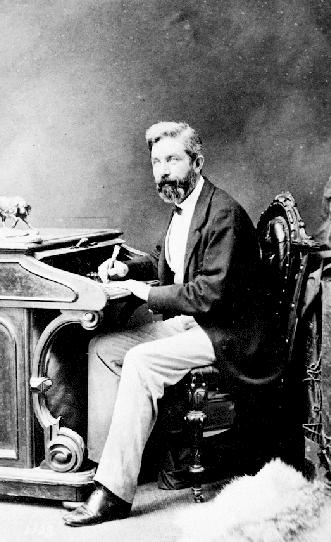
John S. Helmcken, Speaker of the House of Assembly

Dr. John Sebastian Helmcken, chosen as the first Speaker of the Assembly, would remain in that role until British Columbia joined Canadian Confederation in 1871. He was Douglas's son-in-law, and like his fellow assemblymen Surveyor-General Joseph Despard Pemberton and HBC company-man Joseph McKay, was considered part of what Amor De Cosmos termed the "family-company compact". John Muir, a sawmill-owner and coalmaster who represented Sooke, had also recently been in the employ of Douglas. James Yates, the Victoria publican, and Thomas Skinner, the farmer, were the voices of dissent in the assembly, always at odds with the company and its men.

As franchise widened and the assembly became more influential, this division remained. Reformers such as Amor de Cosmos and Leonard McClure, who began to truly challenge the power of Douglas and his successor Arthur Edward Kennedy, continued to butt heads with establishment supporters such as George Hunter Cary, Henry Pering Pellew Crease and Robert Burnaby and William Fraser Tolmie.

== Members of the Legislative Assembly ==
Members 1856-1860: 1st Session

Name	District	First elected	No. of terms	Notes
John Sebastian Helmcken	Esquimalt District	1856	1st term	Speaker
Thomas James Skinner	Esquimalt District	1856	1st term	
Dr. John Frederick Kennedy	Nanaimo District	1856	1st term	
John Muir	Sooke District	1856	1st term	resigned 5 May 1857
Edward Edwards Langford	Victoria District	1856	1st term	election contested and he was removed 26 August 1856
Joseph Despard Pemberton	Victoria District	1856	1st term	
James Yates	Victoria District	1856	1st term	
Joseph McKay (1856)	Victoria District	1856	1st term	elected on December 3, 1856

Members 1860-1863: 2nd Session

Name	District	First elected	No. of terms	Notes
John Sebastian Helmcken	Esquimalt County	1856	2nd term	Speaker
James Cooper	Esquimalt County	1860	1st term	resigned
Robert Burnaby (1860)	Esquimalt County	1860	1st term	elected on July 27, 1860
George Tomline Gordon	Esquimalt Town	1860	1st term	resigned
Thomas Harris (1862)	Esquimalt Town	1862	1st term	elected on March 31, 1862 and resign
William Cocker (1862)	Esquimalt Town	1862	1st term	elected on September 9, 1862
George Foster Foster	Lake District	1860	1st term	
Augustus Rupert Green	Nanaimo District	1860	1st term	resigned on February 6, 1861
David Babington Ring (1861)	Nanaimo District	1861	1st term	elected on November 4, 1861
Joseph Johnson Southgate	Saltspring and Chemainus District	1860	1st term	
John Coles	Saanich	1860	1st term	
William John McDonald	Sooke District	1860	1st term	
William Fraser Tolmie	Victoria District	1860	1st term	
Henry Pering Pellew Crease	Victoria District	1860	1st term	resigned on October 18, 1861
Joseph William Trutch (1861)	Victoria District	1861	1st term	elected on November 26, 1861
Alfred Pendrell Waddington	Victoria District	1860	1st term	resigned on October 15, 1861
James Trimble (1861)	Victoria District	1861	1st term	elected on November 26, 1861
George Hunter Cary	Victoria Town	1860	1st term	
Selim Franklin	Victoria Town	1860	1st term	

Members 1863-1866: 3rd Session

Name	District	First elected / previously elected	No. of terms	Notes
John Sebastian Helmcken	Esquimalt and Metchosin District	1856	3rd term	Speaker
Robert Burnaby	Esquimalt and Metchosin District	1860	2nd term	resigned
John Ash (1865)	Esquimalt and Metchosin District	1865	1st term	elected on November 28, 1865
George Foster Foster	Esquimalt Town	1863	1st term	
Joseph Johnson Southgate (1864)	Esquimalt Town	1864	1st term	
Edward Stamp (1866)	Esquimalt Town	1866	1st term	
James Carswell	Lake District	1863	1st term	
Charles Alfred Bayley	Nanaimo District	1863	1st term	resigned
Thomas Cunningham (1866)	Nanaimo District	1866	1st term	elected on January 5, 1866
John Trevasso Pidwell	Saltspring and Chemainus District	1863	1st term	resigned
George Edgar Dennes (1863)	Saltspring and Chemainus District	1863	1st term	elected on October 13, 1863 and resigned
John Trevasso Pidwell (1866)	Saltspring and Chemainus District	1863, 1866	2nd term*	re-elected on May 30, 1866
James Carswell	Sooke District	1863	1st term	
William Alexander George Young	Victoria City	1863	1st term	resigned
Charles Bedford Young (1864)	Victoria City	1864	1st term	elected on October 25, 1864 and resigned
Leonard McClure (1865)	Victoria City	1864	1st term	elected on February 14, 1865
Amor De Cosmos	Victoria City	1863	1st term	
Israel Wood Powell (British Columbia politician)	Victoria City	1863	1st term	
Joseph Charles Ridge	Victoria City	1863	1st term	resigned
Selim Franklin (1864)	Victoria City	1864	1st term	elected on February 1, 1864
Charles Bedford Young (1866)	Victoria City	1864, 1866	2nd term*	
William Fraser Tolmie	Victoria District	1860	2nd term	
Edward Henry Jackson	Victoria District	1863	1st term	resigned
James Dickson (1864)	Victoria District	1864	1st term	elected on September 22, 1864
James Trimble	Victoria District	1861	2nd term	

== Elections to the Vancouver Island House of Assembly ==
- 1856 Vancouver Island Election
- 1860 Vancouver Island Election
- 1863 Vancouver Island Election

== See also ==
- Legislative Council of British Columbia
