= 1860 Colony of Vancouver Island election =

British colonial election in North America

A total of 13 members were elected to the Second House of Assembly of Vancouver Island, which sat from March 1, 1860, to February 27, 1863. The members were elected over a number of weeks in January with each constituency holding its election on a different day.

The election did not have political parties but did feature two factions. One was made up of men connected with the Hudson's Bay Company and close to Governor James Douglas and the other of reformers led by the British Colonist editor Amor De Cosmos. The reform faction lost in most cases and Amor De Cosmos used his newspaper to claim the election was not run fairly. Of particular concern to De Cosmos was that the 'coloured' people voted primarily for the HBC candidates. The information on who is from which faction is from information in the British Colonist, which was not neutral.

== Constituencies ==
- Victoria Town – 2 to be elected

George Hunter Cary, 137
Selim Franklin, 106
Amor De Cosmos, 91 Reformer

- Victoria District – 3 to be elected

William Fraser Tolmie, 44 HBC
Henry Pering Pellew Crease, 39 HBC resigned October 18, 1861, replaced by Joseph William Trutch on November 26, 1861
Alfred Pendrell Waddington, 35 Reformer, resigned October 15, 1861, replaced by James Trimble
James Yates, 14 Reformer
C. A. Bayley, 14 Reformer

- Esquimalt County – 2 to be elected

John Sebastian Helmcken, 36 HBC
James Cooper, 22 Reformer resigned July 27, 1860, replaced by Robert Burnaby
Thomas James Skinner, 21 Ind

- Esquimalt Town

George Tomline Gordon, 27 resigned and was replaced by Thomas Harris March 31, 1862. He resigned on September 9, 1862, and was replaced by William Cocker.
James Cooper, 10 – also ran in Esquimalt County and was elected there.

- Lake District

George Foster Foster, 32
Captain Duncan, 7

- Sooke District

William John McDonald, Reformer elected by acclamation

- Saanich

John Coles, won by acclamation

- Saltspring and Chemainus District

Joseph Johnson Southgate, 11
John Copland, 4

- Nanaimo District

Augustus Rupert Green, (unknown if he faced an opponent) resigned February 6, 1861, replaced on November 4, 1861, by David Babington Ring
