= Joseph William McKay =

Canadian politician

- Born: January 31, 1829 (Rupert’s House) Waskaganish, Rupert's Land
- Died: December 17, 1900 (aged 71); Victoria, British Columbia
- Occupations: Fur trader, explorer, politician and justice of the peace
- Spouse: Helen Holmes
- Children: 4 daughters and 2 sons
- Parent(s): William McKay and Mary Bunn

Joseph William McKay (Mackay) (31 January 1829 – 17 December 1900) was a fur trader, businessman, politician and explorer who had a long career in the employ of the Hudson's Bay Company in Canada.

== Early life ==
Joseph William McKay was born on January 31, 1829, at Rupert's House in Waskaganish, Rupert's Land, to William and Mary Bunn McKay, both Métis. His father was a clerk with the Hudson's Bay Company. His grandfather, John Richards McKay, and uncles were active in the fur trade.

When he was nine or ten years old Joseph William was sent to the Red River Academy where he remained for five years, boarding with his maternal grandfather, Thomas Bunn; according to family tradition his parents had intended to send him to school in Scotland but he literally missed the boat.

He married Helen Holmes at Victoria, British Columbia, on June 16, 1860. Together they had four daughters and two sons.

== Career ==
=== Hudson's Bay Company ===
He began working for the Hudson's Bay Company in Fort Vancouver in 1844 at the age of 15 and was sent by Governor Simpson to serve as an apprentice seaman on a Pacific coast vessel. After serving his apprenticeship he moved to Fort Victoria where when not carrying on his clerical duties, he acted as surgical assistant to J. S. Helmcken. The following September he accompanied the British naval officers Captain Henry W. Parke and Lieutenant William Peel on their reconnaissance of Oregon Territory. In 1846 he was transferred to Fort Victoria where he participated in a survey that winter of the area around Victoria and Esquimalt. In 1848 he was promoted to the rank of postmaster, and the following year he was Roderick Finlayson’s second in command at Fort Victoria. Eventually he rose to become second-in-command under Governor James Douglas.

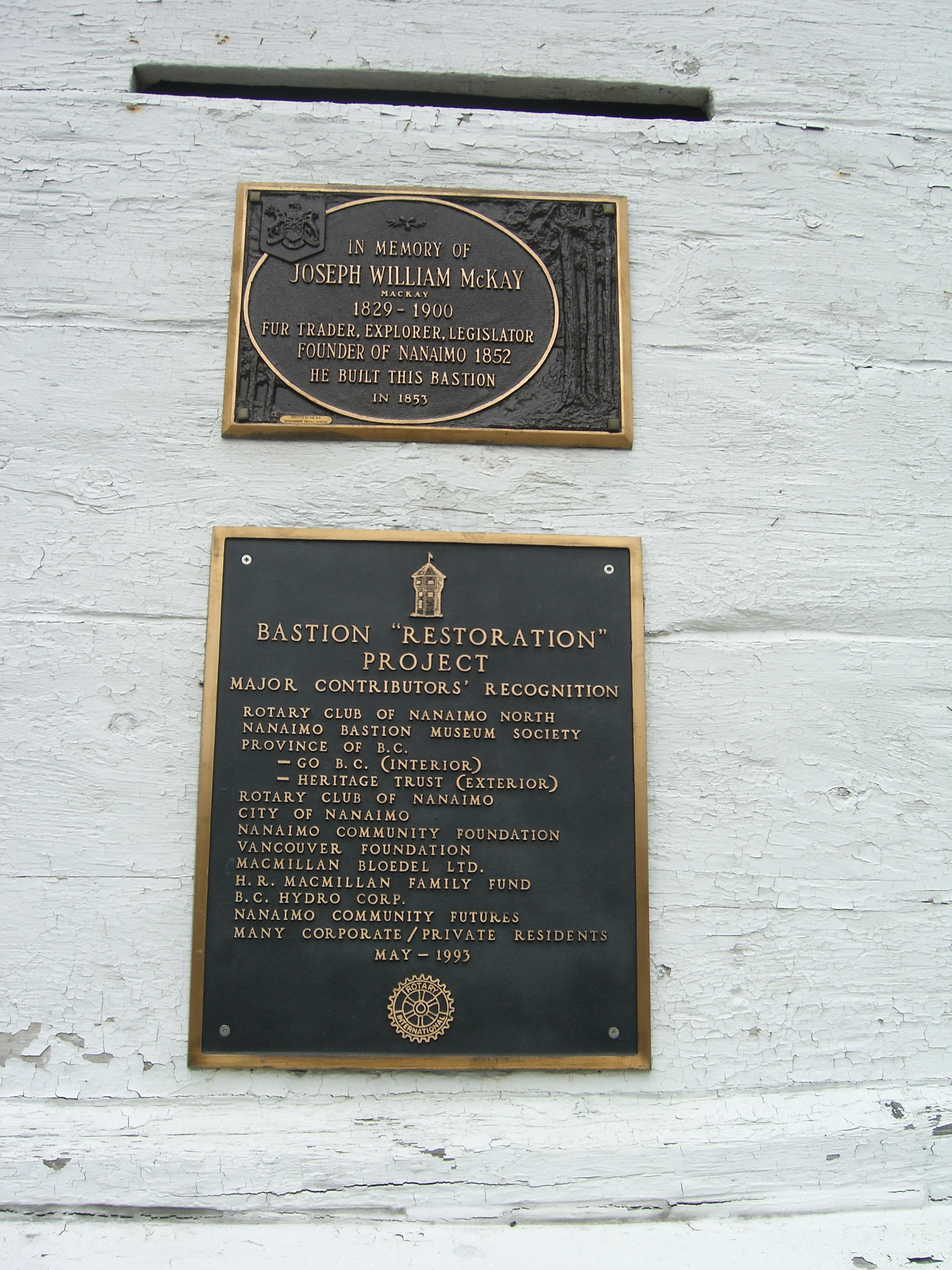
Plaque crediting MacKay as builder of the Nanaimo Bastion and founder of Nanaimo

McKay was instrumental in the discovery of coal at Nanaimo. He moved there in 1849 and took possession of the coal fields for the HBC in 1852. While in charge there McKay opened a coal mine, a sawmill, a saltern, and a school in the settlement. He is credited with the construction of the Nanaimo Bastion.

As an apprentice clerk he played a significant role in the negotiation of the Douglas Treaties in the Colony of Vancouver Island. During the Crimean War McKay was sent to Fort Simpson (Port Simpson, B.C.) to ensure that the HBC and the Russian American Company remained neutral. In the early 1850s Douglas sent McKay to scout the Cowichan and Comox Valleys.

Shortly after the beginning of the Fraser River Gold Rush in the summer of 1858 McKay was sent by Douglas to search for a route to the gold-fields between Howe Sound and Lillooet Lake. In June 1860 he was made chief trader and placed in charge of the Thompson's River district. In 1865, in conjunction with John Rae, McKay conducted a survey of the country between Williams Creek and Tête Jaune Cache in anticipation of the HBC's proposed telegraph line from Fort Garry (Winnipeg) to New Westminster. Between 1866 and 1878 he was in charge of the company's operations at Fort Yale (Yale), in the Kootenay district, and in the Cassiar and the Stikine mining districts, and he directed its coastal trade at Fort Simpson. The HBC promoted him to factor in 1872.

McKay's varied interests involved exploration, economic development, and colonization of Vancouver Island. He was released by the company in 1878 because of the extent of his outside business interests, which included investments in silver mines and timber leases. After leaving the company he was a salmon cannery manager for the North Western Commercial Company of San Francisco.

=== Offices held ===
In 1856 McKay was elected to the first House of Assembly of Vancouver Island representing the Victoria district. He was a justice of the peace from 1876 to 1885.

==== Indian affairs ====
McKay worked for the Dominion government, being appointed census commissioner for British Columbia in 1881 and Indian agent two years later, first for the northwest coast and then for the Kamloops and Okanagan agencies. While agent he urged Indians to take up stock-raising and to grow western crops, attempted to prevent the trespass of Canadian Pacific Railway crews and European settlers on First Nations land, and established an Indian Industrial School near Kamloops. He personally inoculated more than 1,300 Indians with smallpox vaccine between 1886 and 1888. In 1893 he was appointed assistant to Arthur Wellesley Vowell, the superintendent of Indian affairs for British Columbia, a position he held until the time of his death.

== Legacy ==
During his last years in Victoria he also lectured and wrote several articles on the fur trade and on the Indians of British Columbia. McKay was described as an "...undersized man in cowhide coat and breeches, jack-boots & large-peaked cap; like an overgrown jockey." He died in Victoria on 21 December 1900.

Records relating to McKay's career as a chief trader for the Hudson's Bay Company including correspondence, a journal, notes regarding festivals and traditional beliefs of the B.C. Indians and his recollections as Chief Trader are held at the royal BC Museum in Victoria.
