= Pemberton Holmes Real Estate =

Canadian real estate company

Pemberton Holmes Real Estate is a Canadian real-estate company located in Victoria, British Columbia, Canada. It is considered one of the oldest family-owned real estate companies in North America; in continuous operation since 1887. The company was founded by Frederick B. Pemberton, a son of Joseph Despard Pemberton, who was responsible for the land surveying of the area.

Pemberton Holmes has Vancouver Island branch offices located in Victoria, Oak Bay., Sooke, Sidney, Duncan, Ladysmith, Nanaimo, Parksville, Bowser, Courtenay and Campbell River.

The Pemberton Holmes' telephone number may be one of the oldest in Canada, as Victoria was among the first cities in Canada to have telephone service; Pemberton & Son were issued exchange number 8124, which later evolved to its current phone number.

== Family history ==
=== Joseph Despard Pemberton ===
The company began in 1850 when Joseph Despard Pemberton of Victoria, British Columbia, was employed by the Hudson's Bay Company (HBC ) as “a Surveyor and Engineer of thorough business habits and energy with reference the Colonization of Vancouver’s Island.”

The Hudson's Bay Company's Minutes of January 22, 1851 contain this description of J.D. Pemberton's arrangement with the company:

The certificates of Mr. J.D. Pemberton having been taken into consideration, it was ordered that he be engaged as Surveyor for Vancouver’s Island at an Annual Salary of 400 pounds for a term of three years with a premium of such sum as the Governor and Committee may approve at the end of that period not exceeding 500 pounds provided they shall consider his services and conduct perfectly satisfactory. It is understood that he shall make himself generally useful to Mr. Douglas in all colonization business. This engagement is to be a charge upon the Colonization Fund to be held in Trust by the Company. It is also understood that the Company is to provide an outfit of the requisite instruments at a cost not exceeding 100 pounds – to pay Mr. Pemberton’s expenses of conveyance to the Island – and that the salary and commencement of the contract shall date from his arrival on the Island.

=== Fred B. Pemberton ===
Frederick Bernard "Fred" Pemberton (April 26, 1865 – November 7, 1947) was born in Victoria, BC, as the eldest son of Joseph Despard Pemberton and Theresa Jane Despard Pemberton (née Grautoff). At the University College of London, he studied civil and mechanical engineering, graduating in 1886. He had his credentials as a notary public, justice of the peace, surveyor, and miner. In 1887, Fred and his father went into business under the name of Pemberton & Son – Engineers, Surveyors, and Real Estate Agents.

Part of a two-page memorandum written by Fred reads: "A rustling office would not in the long run pay us as well as one conducted on quiet and strict commercial principles."

For the first year, they concentrated mainly on engineering and surveying. On 29 November 1888, they opened an office on Fort Street. In 1893, they began to sell fire insurance as agents of Sun Insurance Office.

He had a daughter, Philippa Despard Pemberton.

Joseph Pemberton died in 1893, leaving the business to the 28-year-old Fred.

=== Henry Cuthbert Holmes ===
Henry Cuthbert Holmes (December 15, 1890 – May 23, 1968) was born in Bellary, Madras Presidency, India, and came to Canada around 1902. In the First World War, he served with both the Indian Army and the Irish Guards, rising to the rank of Major. He married Fred B. Pemberton's daughter, Philippa Despard Pemberton, in Victoria, BC, on 12 October 1917.

In 1920, Cuthbert Holmes joined his father-in-law, in Pemberton & Son. In 1933, Holmes became president of the company, which became Pemberton Holmes Ltd. in 1944. Holmes retired in 1967.

Cuthbert Holmes Park is named after him, and is located in the District of Saanich, a municipality near Victoria, British Columbia.

=== Philip "Pip" Holmes ===
Philip "Pip" Holmes (February 2, 1924 - May 18, 2007), son of Henry Cuthbert Holmes, joined Pemberton Holmes Ltd. in 1945, and became president in 1965. He was elected chairman of the Provincial Capital Commission and served as vice-chairman of the University of Victoria's board of governors. He was president of the International Real Estate Federation from 1975 to 1977.

He was an advocate of the right to shelter, the right to own land, and land stewardship. On Vancouver Island, a number of properties were influenced by Holmes including the Cathedral Grove nature preserve.

He believed that Vancouver Island could emulate Switzerland with high employment, good incomes, and green fields if the principles of good stewardship were in place.

=== Phil Holmes ===
In 1988, Pip retired and his nephew, Phil Holmes, headed the company to 2003. Phil Holmes is the son of Dr. Terry Holmes, the younger brother of Cuthbert Holmes.

Phil Holmes moved the office to 805 Cloverdale Avenue. He focused on growing the insurance branch of the company. Later, Phil purchased Harbord Insurance and he merged the two firms into one. He sold the company to Michael P. A. Holmes in 2003.

== Eponymous locations ==
=== Pemberton Building ===
In 1899, Charles A. Vernon of the B.C. Pottery Company constructed a building at the corner of Broughton and Government Streets in Victoria, BC. A few years later, it became the offices of Pemberton Holmes Realtors. Originally the site of Fort Victoria, a tablet was affixed to the building to mark the historical site.

In 1910, a new building was constructed at Fort and Broad Streets that became the offices of Pemberton & Son. The City of Victoria archives are home to a number of photographs of the interior and exterior of the building in various states of construction.

=== Pemberton Chapel ===
In 1909, the Pemberton Memorial Chapel was designed by J.C.M. Keith and constructed on the grounds of the Royal Jubilee Hospital by the Parfitt Brothers. Joseph Pemberton's widow, Teresa Pemberton, donated the Pemberton Chapel to the hospital as a memorial of her husband. The chapel functioned as a regular church that held weekly services for patients and staff, as well as being the location of many of the nurse's weddings.

The Victoria Heritage Association describes it in this excerpt:

A bridge from the modern hospital building, which wraps around it, replaces the original granite entry stair. The roof, with its original slate, is hipped, with a gable on the east end, over a modest rose window. The nave is rectangular, while the apse is semi-octagonal. Heavy timbers spring from hand-painted brackets to support the roof. The interior walls are panelled in stained and varnished wainscotting, with matching pews and furnishings; the walls above the panelling are natural brick. The windows throughout are simple diamond lights in round arched openings. The Norman-style chancel arch and the west windows are emphasized with terracotta mouldings. A choir loft at the rear now houses an organ.

=== Pemberton Memorial Operating Room ===
In 1896, the Pemberton Memorial Operating Room was built for the sum of $3,614.00 with funds donated by the estate of J. D. Pemberton. The facility featured "easily cleaned ceramic tile floor, radiused plaster walls, modern hot water system, and an attached sterilizing room;" features considered state-of-the-art during the period of its construction. The Pemberton Memorial Operating Room was designated a National Historic Site of Canada in 2004.

== Donation of archives ==
In 2012, the company donated their historical business archives to the Royal BC Museum in order to make these artifacts available for study now and in the future. The collection included more than 2400 client files, 300 photos, maps, plans, and approximately 180 bound volumes of correspondence. It is one of the largest collections of single business holdings to be donated to the Royal BC Museum. The donation was reported on by local newspapers and television stations, including Shaw TV
