= Nanaimo Bastion =

Historic building in British Columbia, Canada

Coordinates: 49°10′1.45″N 123°56′8.37″W

The Nanaimo Bastion
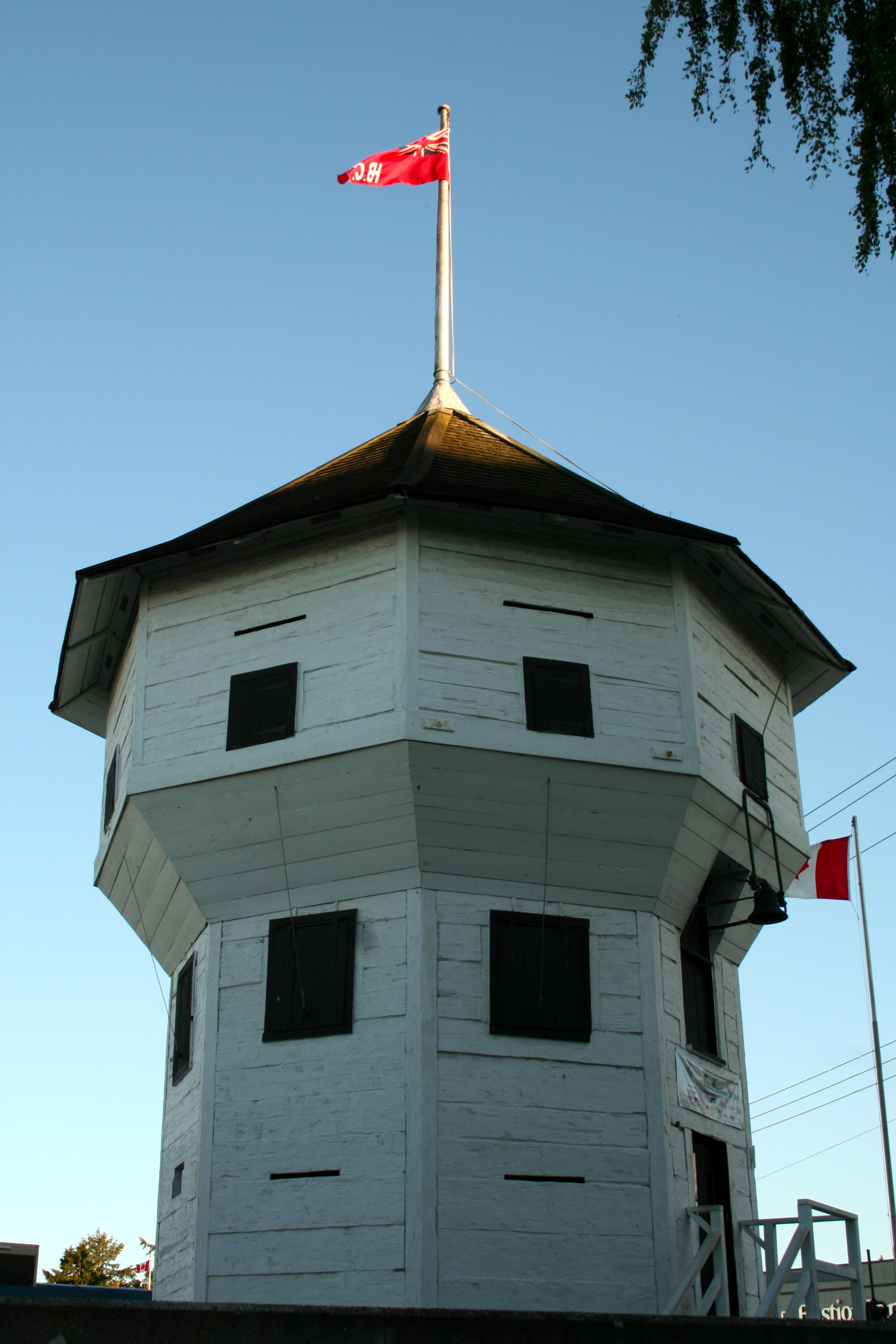
- Interactive map of the The Nanaimo Bastion area

General information
- Architectural style: Octagon Mode
- Location: 98 Front Street, Nanaimo, British Columbia, Canada
- Construction started: 1853
- Completed: 1855
- Client: Hudson's Bay Company

Technical details
- Structural system: 3 story blockhouse structure, wood material, projecting 3rd floor
- Floor count: 3

Design and construction
- Architect: Hudson's Bay Company

Website
- http://nanaimomuseum.ca/exhibits-collections/the-bastion/

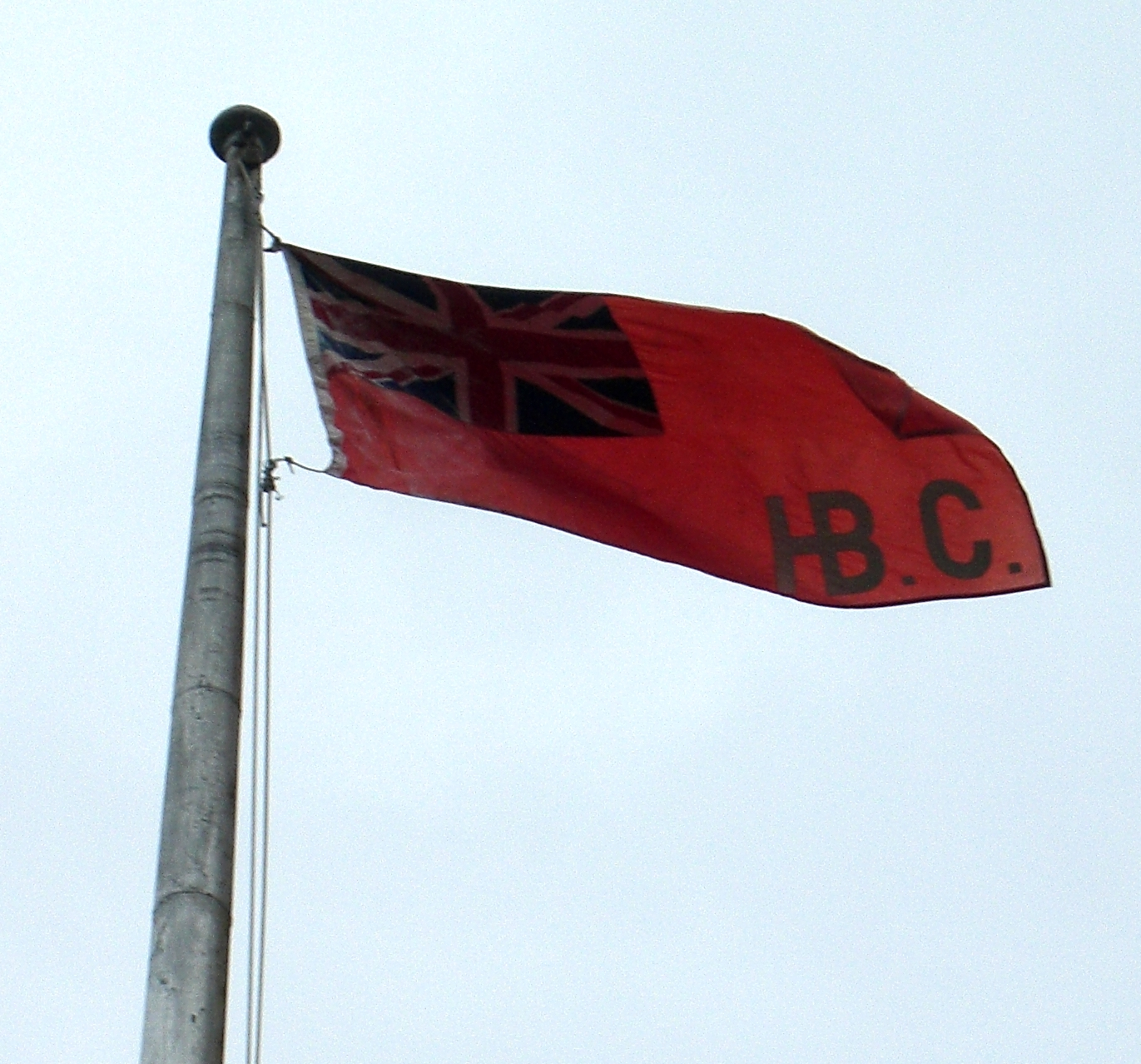
HBC flag atop the Bastion

The Nanaimo Bastion is a historical octagon-shaped blockhouse located at 98 Front Street in Nanaimo, British Columbia, Canada. The Hudson's Bay Company, which then held a royal lease on all of what was then the Colony of Vancouver Island, built it between 1853 and 1855 to defend its coal mining operations in Nanaimo. It has been called "Nanaimo's premier landmark", because of its shape and its high visibility from both land and sea.

The Bastion was constructed using the pièce-sur-pièce (post-and-plank) method. This entailed laying timbers across each other horizontally, with tenons cut into the ends. These tenons would then be inserted into vertical posts. This method was used partially due to the expensive cost of nails; by using the pièce-sur-pièce method, very few nails were needed. The logs were squared using only basic hand tools: a crosscut saw, broadaxe, adze, auger, and pit saw. The wooden structure sat on a masonry foundation and was three stories tall. It is the only remaining freestanding tower structure built by the Hudson's Bay Company.

In 1891, the Bastion faced demolition threats. The city, recognising the historic value of the building, paid a sum of $175 for the building and moved it across the street from its original location (this would be the parking lot of the modern day Dorchester Hotel). It was moved a second time in 1979, when the roads were being widened. On 12 December 1985, the city of Nanaimo designated it a local heritage site. During the summer of 2010, the Bastion was torn apart to renew rotting boards and add stabilizing steel beams. The director of the event said that they were "making a historic movement".

The Bastion is managed by the Nanaimo Museum and is open to visitors during the summer. It functions as a tourist information centre on behalf of Tourism Nanaimo, and holds exhibits on the history of the building. The Nanaimo Museum also hosts a daily cannon firing at noon during the summer months, just a few feet away from the Bastion.

The Bastion is the main image on HMCS Nanaimo's ships crest. HMCS Nanaimo is a Kingston-class Coastal Defence vessel that has been serving in the Royal Canadian Navy since 1997.

== First floor ==
Snuneymuxw chief Che-wich-i-kcan (historically known as "Coal Tyee") was the gateway to the coal industry in Nanaimo. It was in 1849 that he mentioned the presence of burnable black rocks near his village to a blacksmith in Victoria. The Hudson's Bay Company got word of the conversation, and asked Che-wich-i-kcan for verification. The Hudson's Bay Company at the time was going through a transition period, and they were more interested in the natural resources of Vancouver Island, rather than the fur trade. When they did verify the presence of coal in the Nanaimo region, they abandoned their previous coal pursuits in Fort Rupert and moved down island.

Upon the confirmation of coal in Nanaimo, Joseph William McKay was sent as a company clerk on behalf of the Hudson's Bay Company. Joseph's family had worked for the HBC for a couple of generations. He was Métis, born in Québec and worked his way across the continent with the Company. McKay spoke many languages, including Michif, English, French, and a number of Indigenous languages. He oversaw the construction of the Bastion, and used its first floor as his office to conduct the day-to-day operations. These operations would have included overseeing the management of the local mines and settlement, ordering supplies, and storing/distributing trade goods. Part of the managerial duties included maintaining correspondence with Fort Victoria, Locally, messages and people were carried via small "express canoes" between Victoria and Fort Langley, while supplies would have been carried on larger vessels such as the Beaver and the Otter. In some cases, supplies had to be ordered from England, and could take up to two years to be delivered.

The first floor of the Bastion has historic information on the trade industry of Nanaimo, and gives more insight on McKay's role in the coal industry in Nanaimo.

== Second floor ==
The Bastion's second floor was home to Nanaimo's arsenal. On this floor, two four-pound and two six-pound carronades were held. The cannons were brought over by the Hudson's Bay Company in 1853, when the Bastion was being constructed. Guns, ammunition and additional firing supplies were also stored here. The purpose of the Bastion and cannons were for defense. The cannons were fired in welcoming ceremonies when dignitaries were sailing into the harbour and the cannons were fired into the forest across the harbour to intimidate the First Nations. The largest level on the third floor sheltered settlers and offered a vantage point to fire down upon foes. The bastion was finished in 1854.

The second floor now holds information and exhibits on the guns of Nanaimo, as well as a timeline highlighting the building's history and construction.

== Third floor ==
The third floor was used as storage and refuge for the HBC employees and families.

== Gallery ==
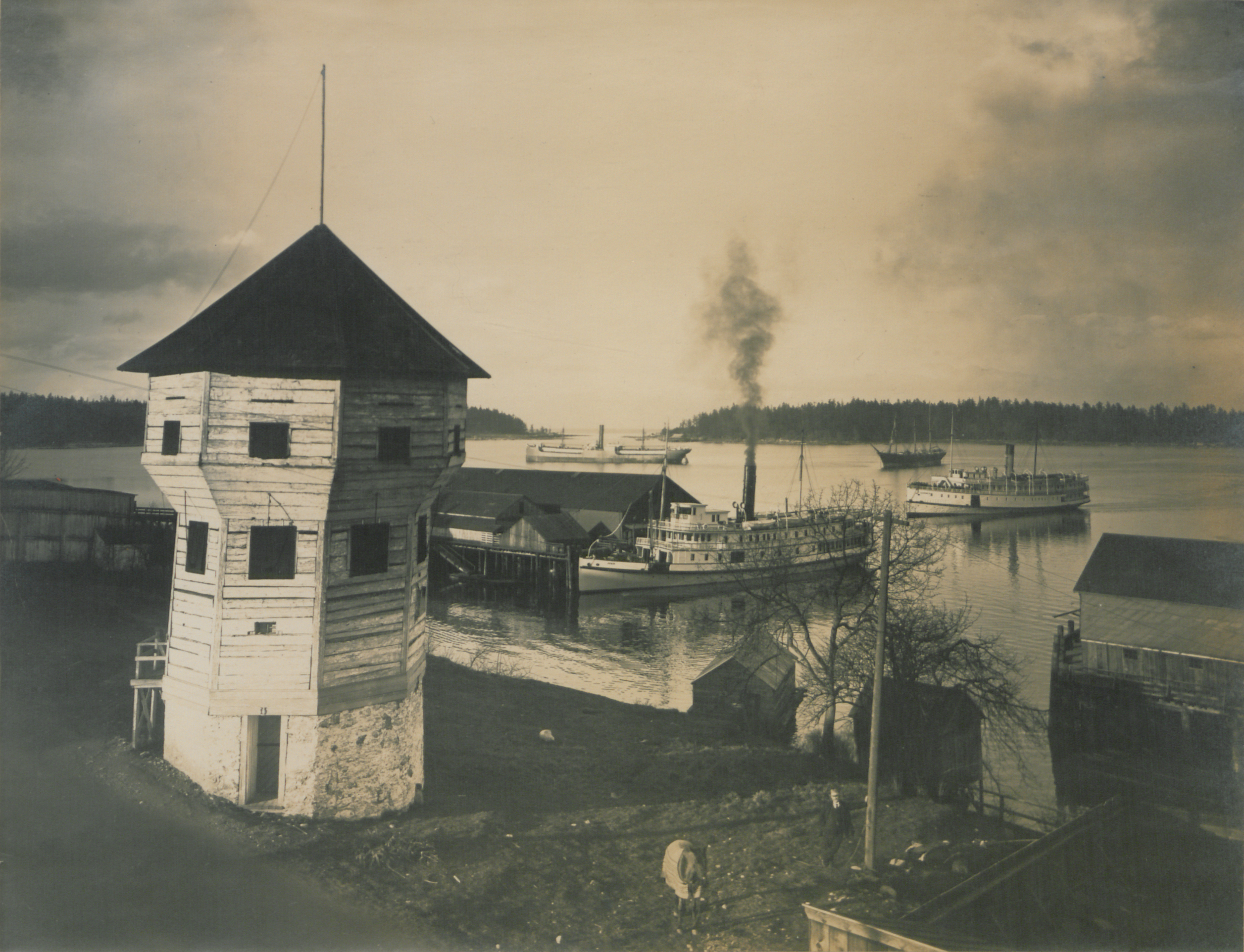
View of Nanaimo Harbour showing the Bastion and passenger vessels

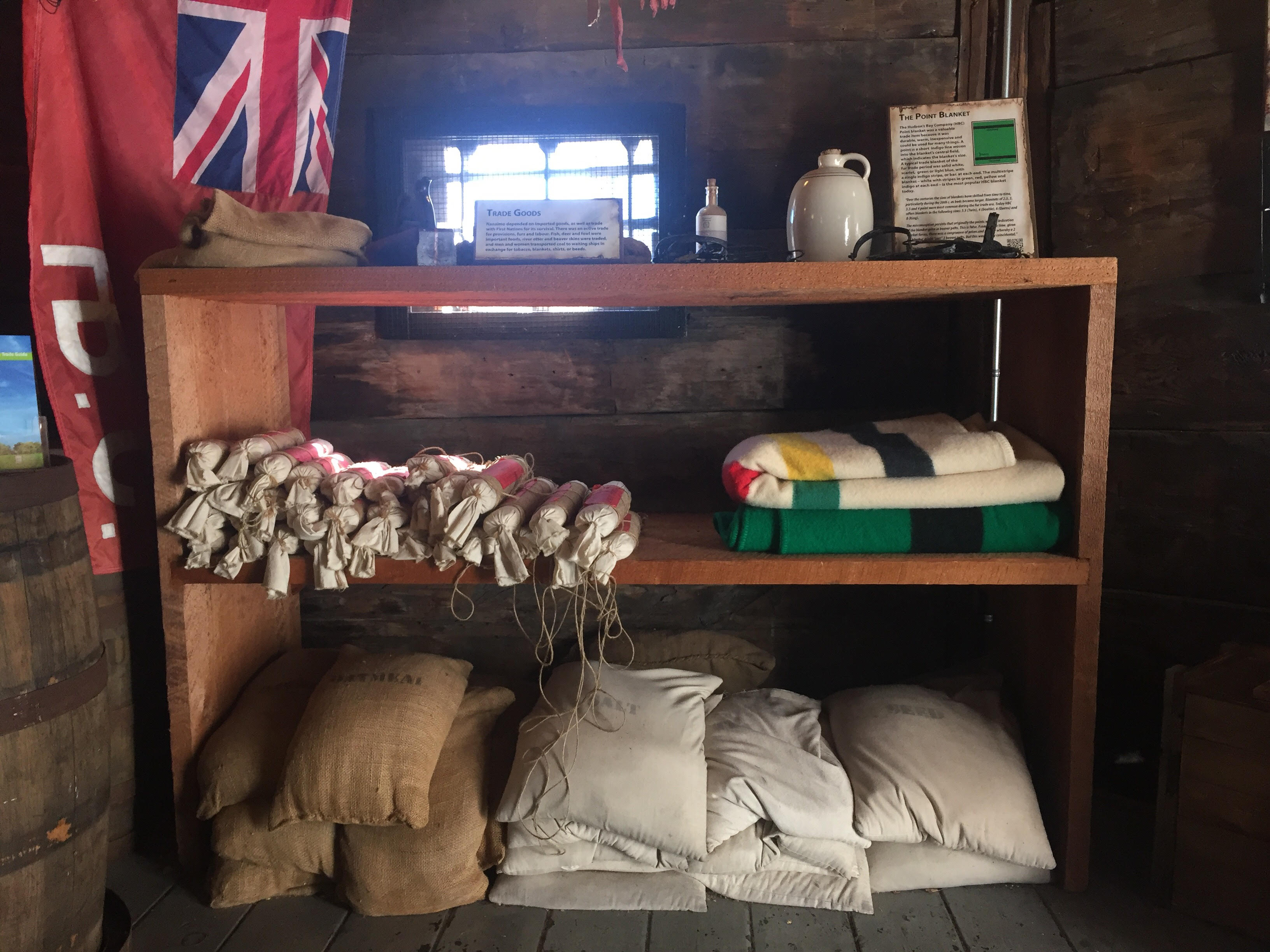
Example of trade goods from the 1800s on display in the Bastion

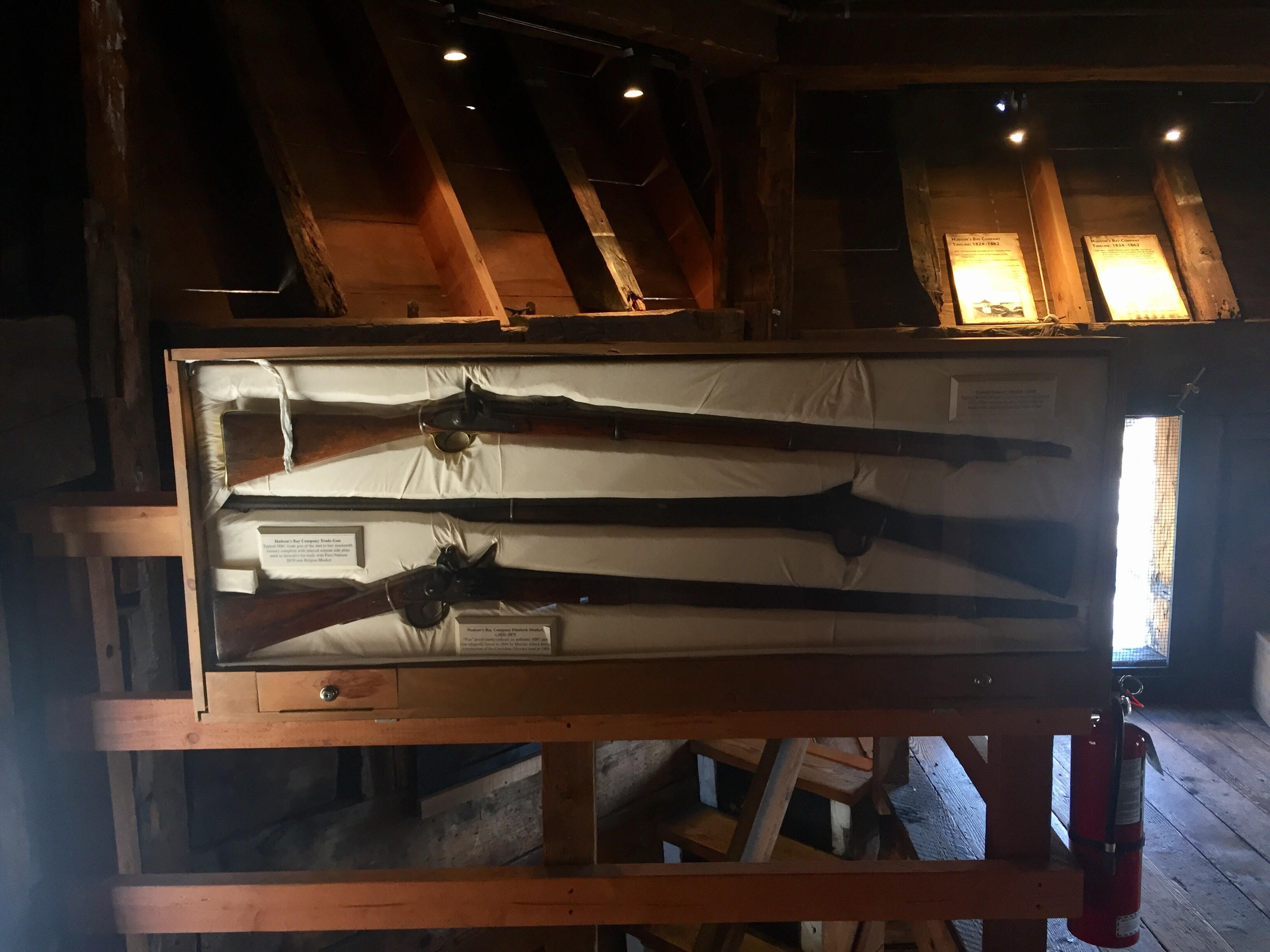
Some guns from the 1800s, originally owned by Hudson's Bay employees, on the second floor of the Bastion.

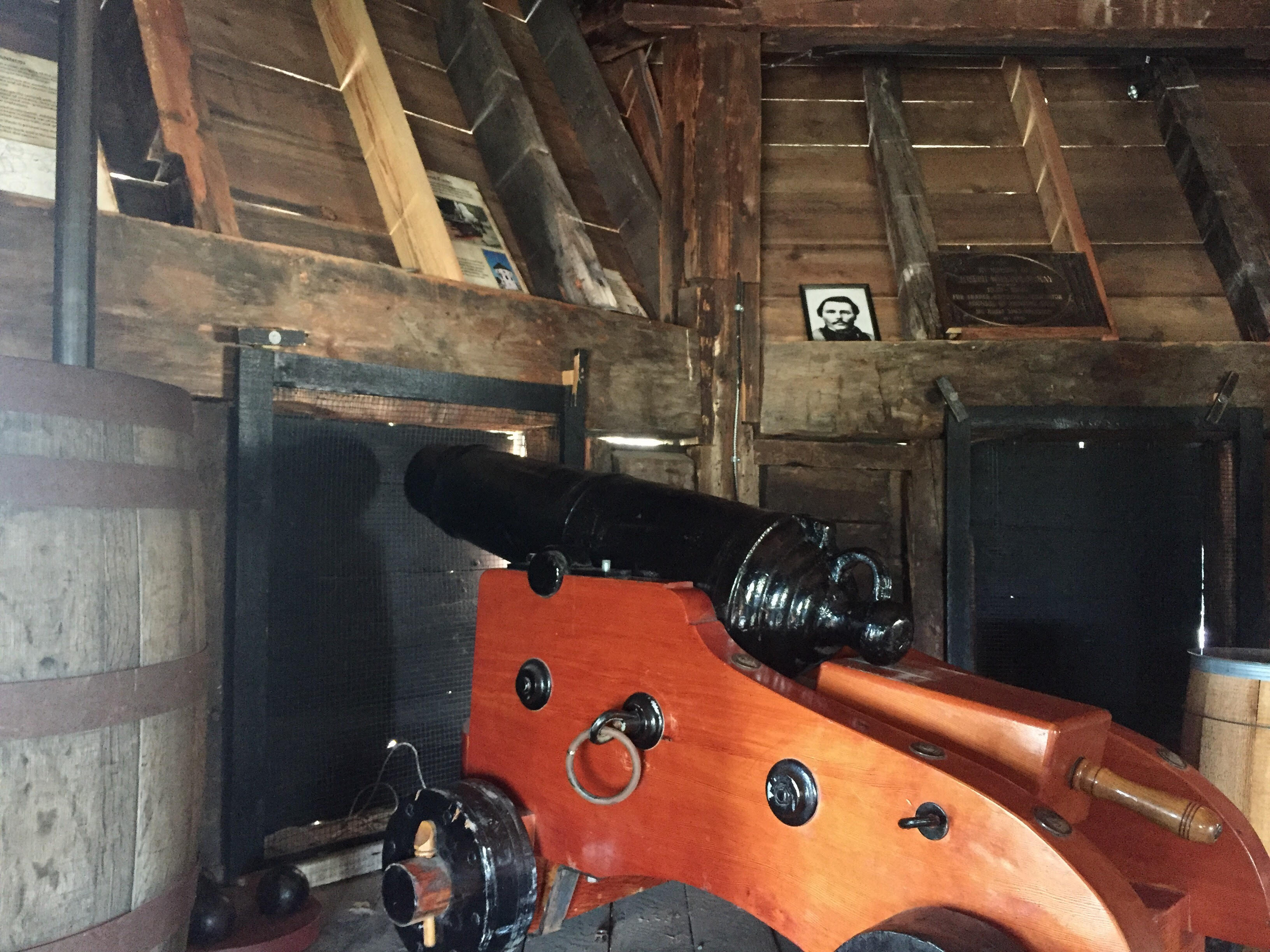
One of the original 4-pound carronades on display at the Bastion. Its twin is on display in the Nanaimo Museum.

== See also ==
- James Douglas
- List of historic places in the Nanaimo Regional District
- Nanaimo Harbour
