= Leonard McClure =

British Columbian politician and printer (1835–1867)

Member of the Legislative Assembly of Vancouver Island
- In office February 14, 1865 – August 31, 1866 Serving with Amor De Cosmos, Selim Franklin, (Note: Until May 2, 1866) Israel Wood Powell, Charles Bedford Young (Note: From May 2, 1866)
- Preceded by: Charles Bedford Young
- Succeeded by: assembly abolished
- Constituency: Victoria City

1st President of New Westminster City Council (Note: From 1860 to 1872 in British Columbia, the presiding officer of a municipal council was not elected directly by their constituents, but was elected internally by members of their own municipal council. In New Westminster, this person was given the title of president. After 1872, the provincial government mandated that a council's presiding officer must be a directly elected mayor, at which point the position was renamed accordingly.)
- In office August 1860 – February 1861
- Preceded by: position established
- Succeeded by: John Ramage

New Westminster Alderman
- In office 1860–1861

Personal details
- Born: December 25, 1835 Belfast, Ireland
- Died: June 14, 1867 (aged 31) San Francisco, United States

Leonard McClure (December 25, 1835 – June 14, 1867) was an Irish-Canadian journalist, printer, and politician. He was the first mayor of New Westminster, and was a member of the Legislative Assembly of Vancouver Island from 1865 to 1866.

== Biography ==
McClure was born in Lisburn, Ireland in 1835. In his adolescence, he moved to London to work as a stenographer in the United Kingdom Parliament. He then emigrated to Victoria, Australia in 1855 to continue his writing career during the Victorian gold rush.

By 1858, McClure had moved overseas to California, and began publishing a newspaper in Sacramento. Less than a year later, he moved to Vancouver Island, and began publishing the Government Gazette for the Colonies of Vancouver Island and British Columbia and the New Westminster Times.

In November 1859, he decided to move to New Westminster on the mainland, to continuing printing the New Westminster Times. There, McClure became a prominent political figure in the townsite, and became associated with a political group who wanted the British Columbia mainland colony to form a representative and responsible government, independent from Governor James Douglas's rule. In July 1860, the colonial government incorporated New Westminster as a municipality, and established the municipal council of New Westminster. In the city's first election, McClure was elected to the council. McClure was then elected by his colleagues to be the first president of New Westminster (mayor of New Westminster). McClure wished to create a British Columbian Convention to replace the mostly unelected Colonial Assembly of British Columbia, but the petition was unsuccessful as the reformers could not agree on certain details. The exact reason for the disagreement was not completely clear, but it seems that the reformers were split on whether the convention should perform more of an advisory role to the existing governor, while more hardline reformers wanted a new viceroy for the mainland colony, and more representative government institutions. In February 1861, McClure acquired a printing plant in Victoria, resigned from the council, and moved himself and his business back to Vancouver Island.

After several years of focusing on his printing career, McClure rejoined politics and was elected to the Legislative Assembly of Vancouver Island in a 1865 by-election. He again associated himself with the reformers. On April 23, 1866, McCLure spoke for sixteen straight hours in the assembly, setting the record for the longest continuous speech in a legislative assembly in British Columbia. As forming a responsible government in British Columbia became less and less likely, McClure began to advocate for American annexation as an alternative to a British colonial government. However, this idea was still very unpopular, and McClure slowly started to lose the confidence of his colleagues in politics and his printing business. In December 1866, McClure left British Columbia for San Francisco where he continued to run printing plants until his death in June 1867.
