= Statue of John Sebastian Helmcken =

Statue in Victoria, British Columbia

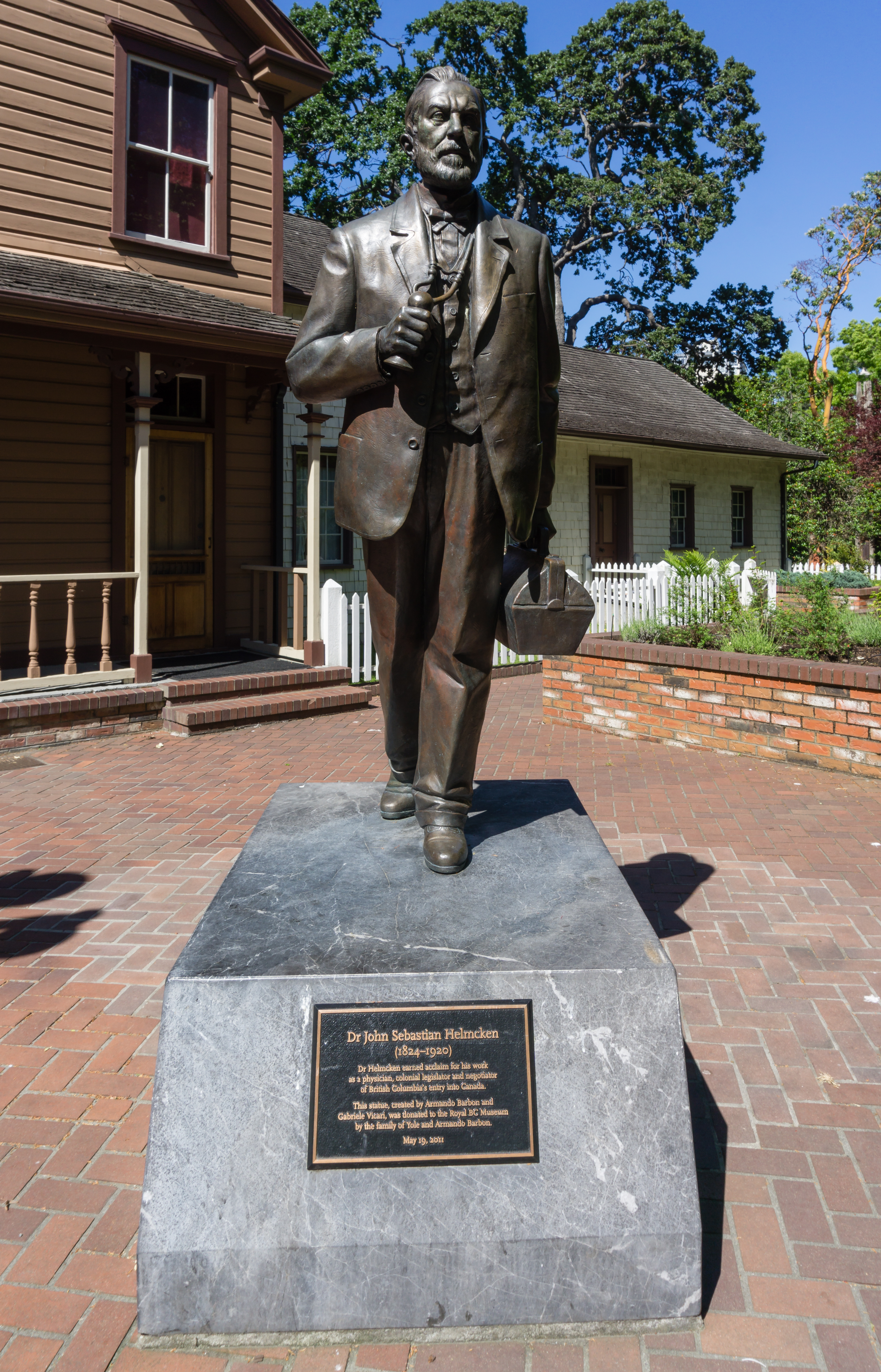
- The statue in 2018
- Artist: Armando Barbon
- Year: 2011
- Medium: Bronze sculpture
- Subject: John Sebastian Helmcken
- Location: Victoria, British Columbia, Canada; 48.41953°N 123.36708°W

The bronze sculpture of Canadian physician John Sebastian Helmcken was installed outside the Helmcken House, in Victoria, British Columbia, in 2011. The statue was designed and created by artist Armando Barbon, and cost $180,000.

The sculpture's plaque has the following inscription: "Dr Helmcken earned acclaim for his work as a physician, colonial legislator and negotiator of British Columbia’s entry into Canada. This statue, created by Armando Barbon and Gabriele Vicari, was donated to the Royal BC Museum by the family of Yole and Armando Barbon. May 19, 2011"

== See also ==
- 2011 in art
