= Camosun =

Camosun may refer to:

- Fort Camosun, the second name of what became Fort Victoria, British Columbia, Canada
- Camosun College, a community college in Victoria, British Columbia
- Camosun (steamship), serving British Columbia
- SS Fort Camosun, a coal-burning freighter, built in Victoria, British Columbia
