= Richard Blanshard =

Canadian politician

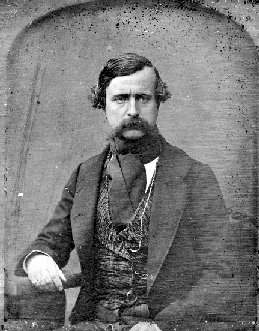
- Richard Blanshard

Governor of the Colony of Vancouver Island
- In office 1849–1851
- Succeeded by: James Douglas

Personal details
- Born: 19 October 1817; London
- Died: 5 June 1894 (aged 76); London

Richard Blanshard MA (19 October 1817 – 5 June 1894) was an English barrister and first governor of the Colony of Vancouver Island from its foundation in 1849 to his resignation in 1851.

== Biography ==
Blanshard was born in London to a wealthy mercantile family, and after reading law at Cambridge University, served in the army in British India. At the age of 32, a personal connection helped secure Blanshard the post of colonial governor of Vancouver Island. Although the commission was dated in July, 1849, Blanshard did not arrive in the colony's capital of Fort Victoria until March of the following year.

Blanshard's short tenure proved unhappy from the start, largely because of the enormous power and influence wielded by the Hudson's Bay Company and its autocratic Chief Factor, James Douglas. Indeed, prior to Blanshard's appointment, there had been serious consideration given by the colonial office to appointing Douglas governor, but concerns over conflict of interest prevented it.

Blanshard arrived to a colony in which the land had been given as a ten-year lease to the Hudson's Bay Company, with Douglas given a mandate to attract settlement. Almost the entire non-First Nations population were Company employees, answerable to Douglas, and Blanshard was prevented from setting up a colonial assembly by the fact that so few of them met the qualifications of electors, i.e., land ownership. Inevitable jurisdictional conflicts arose between Douglas and Blanshard, and the colonial office, too, took Blanshard to task for indiscriminate retributions taken against the First Nations population near present-day Port Hardy. The absence of any real power, combined with health concerns and the enormous cost of living drove Blanshard to resign; he abandoned the colony in September 1851 after just one and a half years there.

Blanshard evidently did not pursue further colonial service. He married and inherited his family's estates in Essex and Hampshire. He died in London at the age of 76.

== Places named for Blanshard ==
- Mount Blanshard, part of a group of sugarloaf-type peaks commonly known as the Golden Ears, is located in Golden Ears Provincial Park in the Garibaldi Ranges of the Coast Mountains, immediately north of Maple Ridge, British Columbia.
- The Blanshard River is a tributary of the Tatshenshini River, near the British Columbia–Yukon border.
- Blanshard Island is located among the Gulf Islands northeast of the City of Victoria.
- Blanshard Street is a major thoroughfare in downtown Victoria, running northwards from the north end of Beacon Hill Park to join with Highway 17 just past the Victoria–Saanich boundary.
- A large provincial government structure, The Richard Blanshard Building stands on the corner of Blanshard and Pandora Streets in Victoria.

Preceded by Position Nonexistent	Governor of Vancouver Island; 1849–1851	Succeeded by James Douglas
