= Edward Stamp =

Canadian politician

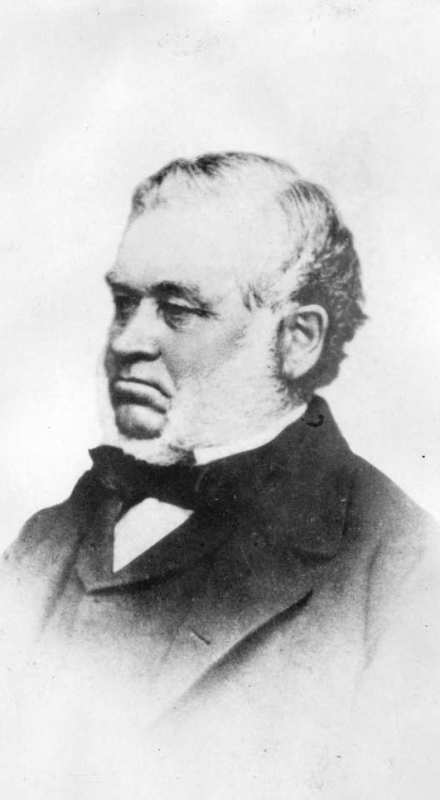
- Stamp c. 1860s

Member of the Legislative Council of British Columbia for Lillooet
- In office 1867–1868

Personal details
- Born: 5 November 1814 Northumberland, England
- Died: 20 January 1872 (aged 57) Middlesex, England
- Occupation: Entrepreneur; politician
- Known for: Founding Hastings Mill

Captain Edward Stamp (5 November 1814 – 20 January 1872) was an English mariner and entrepreneur who contributed to the early economic development of British Columbia and Vancouver Island. Born at Alnwick in Northumberland, Stamp served as the captain of a steam transport in the Crimean War in 1854.

== History ==
In 1865, he formed the British Columbia and Vancouver Island Spar, Lumber and Saw Mill Company to establish a sawmill and logging rights on Burrard Inlet. The company first attempted to locate the mill at Brockton Point in what is now Stanley Park, but inshore currents and a nearby reef made the site impractical and it was shifted about a mile further east, on the south side of the inlet. Due to several business challenges, and perhaps his own difficult personality, Stamp's relationship with the company and his management position came to an end on 2 January 1869. In 1870, the mill was renamed Hastings Mill and eventually seeded the settlement from which the city of Vancouver developed.

Stamp had a minor career in politics, serving on the Legislative Council of British Columbia in 1867 and 1868. He died at Turnham Green, Middlesex, on 20 January 1872.

== See also ==
- Hastings Mill
