= Robert Burnaby =

Canadian politician and freemason

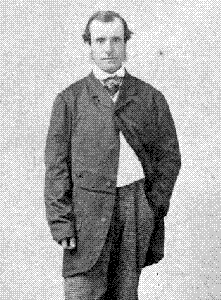

Member of the Legislative Assembly of Vancouver Island
- In office July 27, 1860 – November 28, 1865
- Preceded by: James Cooper
- Succeeded by: John Ash
- Constituency: Esquimalt County (1860–1863); Esquimalt and Metchosin (1863–1865)

Personal details
- Born: 30 November 30 1828 Woodthorpe, Leicestershire
- Died: January 10, 1878 (aged 49) Woodthorpe, Leicestershire
- Children: 1
- Parent(s): The Rev. Thomas Burnaby; Sarah Meares
- Education: St. Paul's School, London
- Occupation: Private Secretary to Richard Clement Moody; freemasonic officer; Member of the Legislative Assembly of Vancouver Island

Robert Burnaby (November 30, 1828 – January 10, 1878) was an English politician and influential freemason in British Columbia, where he served as Private Secretary to Richard Clement Moody, who was the founder and the first Lieutenant-Governor of British Columbia.

Moody named Burnaby Lake, in British Columbia, after Burnaby, and the city of Burnaby was subsequently named after Burnaby, as were at least ten other geographical features, including Burnaby Mountain, Robert Burnaby Park, Burnaby Island in Haida Gwaii, and a street in Vancouver.

== Early life ==
Burnaby was born in Woodthorpe, Leicestershire, on 30 November 1828, to The Rev. Thomas Burnaby (1786–1851), Fellow of Trinity College, Cambridge; Rector of Market Bosworth, Leicestershire, 1841 – 1842; Vicar of Blakesley, Northamptonshire, 1847 – 1851; and Chaplain to the Marquis of Anglesea. His mother was Sarah (d. 1878), daughter of Andrew Neares, of Daventry. He was the seventh child and fourth son of ten children.

Burnaby was a cousin of Colonel Frederick Burnaby, who was known for his ride to Khiva, Turkistan, and was killed at Abou Klea, Egypt, in 1885; and of Captain Edwyn Burnaby (d. 1867); and a brother-in-law of General Collingwood Dickson VC (Inkerman) GCB, Adjutant-General for Ireland.

He was educated at St. Paul's School, London. He became a master mason on 30 May 1854 at Frederick Lodge of Unity, No. 661/452, at Thames Ditton, England, which was later renumbered No. 452 of Croydon, England, and served as its Junior Warden, Senior Warden, Master, and Past Master. He also served as Provincial Grand Director of Ceremonies of Surrey during 1858, and as Past Master of the Royal Somerset House and Inverness Lodge, No. 4, in London, which he joined on 22 January 1856.

== Private Secretary to Richard Clement Moody and Legislative Assembly of Vancouver ==
He worked for 17 years for the British Civil Service in London until, on the strength of a recommendation by Sir Edward Bulwer-Lytton, Richard Clement Moody hired him as his Personal Secretary, and named Burnaby Lake after him.

Burnaby supported Moody in Moody's feud with Sir James Douglas Governor of Vancouver Island. Burnaby had observed that Douglas proceeded with "muddling [Moody's] work and doubling his expenditure" and with employing administrators to "work a crooked policy against Moody" to "retard British Columbia and build up... the stronghold of Hudson's Bay interests" and their own "landed stake".

Burnaby founded a commission-trading business with his friend William Henderson, in Victoria, to speculate in a coal mine in Burrard Inlet. He obtained in October 1863 a crown grant of around 149 acres. Burnaby during 1862 claimed that he had a prior claim, to that of the "Three Greenhorn Englishmen", to what is now the West End, Vancouver, but judge Chartres Brew dismissed his documents as forgeries that were "obviously written by a liar or a knave".

Burnaby ran for the Legislative Assembly and was elected as its member from Esquimalt and Metchosin, as which he served for five years. Burnaby contributed to the foundation of the Victoria Chamber of Commerce, and was President of the Amateur Dramatic Association of Victoria. He was a friend of the Judges Matthew Baillie Begbie and Henry Pering Pellew Crease, and of Gold-Commissioner Thomas Elwyn.

Walford A. Harris, the editor of British Columbia's Colonist, described Burnaby as more liberal and more lucid a speaker than his colleagues, but characterised by a 'want of force', and neither punctual, nor industrious, nor knowledgeable of political science.

== Freemasonry in British Columbia ==
Burnaby contributed to the development of freemasonry in British Columbia. On 20 August 1860, Burnaby was installing master at the foundation of Victoria Lodge No. 1085 (later renumbered No. 783), which was the first lodge in British Columbia, of which he subsequently became an affiliate, and served as master, and served as first Past Master. He also served as Installing Master of Union Lodge, New Westminster, when it was constituted in June 1862.

On 1 June 1863, Burnaby, with freemasons from that Victoria Lodge, and with a charter from the United Grand Lodge of England and from the United Grand Lodge of Scotland, laid the corner stone of the Jewish synagogue at Pandora and Blanshard Streets, Victoria. He became an affiliated member of The Nanaimo Lodge No. 1090 on 3 June 1868.

Burnaby was the first District Grand Master of District Grand Lodge for British Columbia when it was formed in 1868, under the Grand Lodge of England. Burnaby initially opposed a plan by the Scottish Grand Lodge to form their Grand Lodge in British Columbia, until he tabled the motion to create the new Grand Lodge of British Columbia on 21 October 1871, which was created in December 1871. Burnaby refused the post of its Grand Master as a consequence of his poor health, but was elected first Past Grand Master on 27 December 1871, and later served as its Past District Grand Master. He had served as First Principal of Holy Royal Arch freemasonry by 28 December 1871.

He retired after a stroke in 1869, and returned to England for the last time in 1874, and died at Woodthorpe, Leicestershire, on 10 January 1878. He never married.

== Settlements named after Burnaby ==
When the area around Burnaby Lake, which Richard Clement Moody had named after Burnaby, was incorporated, in 1892, the new municipal corporation named the municipality after Burnaby. Burnaby Shoal in Vancouver Harbour, Burnaby Range in MacKenzie Sound, Burnaby Island and Burnaby Strait in the Queen Charlotte Islands, a street in Vancouver's West End, a hill, and a park in Burnaby itself, are named after him. At least eleven geographical features in British Columbia are named after him.
