= Joseph Despard Pemberton =

Canadian politician

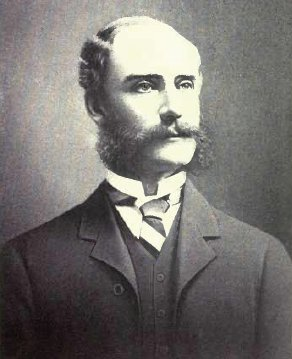
- Born: July 23, 1821; Dublin (Ireland)
- Died: November 11, 1893 (aged 72); Oak Bay, British Columbia, Canada
- Children: Sophie Pemberton

Joseph Despard Pemberton (July 23, 1821 – November 11, 1893) was a surveyor for the Hudson's Bay Company, Surveyor General for the Colony of Vancouver Island, a pre-Confederation politician, a businessman and a farmer. He was born in 1821 in Dublin, Ireland and died in 1893 in Oak Bay, British Columbia. Joseph Pemberton laid out Victoria's town site, southern Vancouver Island and townsites along the Fraser River. He married Teresa Jane Grautoff and they are the parents of Canadian painter Sophie Pemberton. The town of Pemberton was named after him.

== Career ==
After some study and teaching experience in engineering and surveying in his native Ireland and employment in the booming railway industry there, Pemberton took employment with the Hudson's Bay Company as the surveyor and engineer of the Colony which, at the time, was the main settlement area of present British Columbia. He arrived at Fort Victoria June 25, 1851. During the first three-year term of his contract, he laid out the land survey of the Victoria district including the urban and rural areas. His role included development of the settlement by setting sales policy for the lands in addition to survey layout. After completing his work for the Victoria district, he surveyed the coastline of Vancouver Island between Victoria and Nanaimo. Additional duties included supervision of road and bridge construction. He designed the first school and the church in the colony.

In 1857, as Surveyor-General for the Colony of Vancouver Island, Pemberton successfully explored from Cowichan Bay to Nitinat returning by boat down the coast from the Alberni Inlet.

In 1858 and 1859, he laid out the town sites of Fort Yale, Fort Hope, Port Douglas and Derby (Fort Langley) (the proposed capital for the newly created Colony of British Columbia) as the Fraser Canyon Gold Rush in 1858 caused the arrival of settlers in what became the Colony of British Columbia.

In 1859, he left the HBC and was appointed Surveyor General of the Colony of Vancouver Island, a post he held until October 1864. He supervised the development of agricultural land from Salt Spring Island to Comox. He framed the pre-emption law of 1860 which permitted settlers to occupy unsurveyed land up to 160 acres (0.65 km^{2}). This law was a departure from the policy he had earlier been required to follow.

Pemberton, who owned the Gonzales estate, a large farm near Victoria, came to be regarded as part of the HBC's landowning élite, and was dubbed one of the "family-company compact" by reformer Amor De Cosmos. He had been involved in politics from his arrival at the Colony. He was a member of the legislative assembly of the colony from its first election August 4, 1856, until December 1859. He was a member of the legislative council and the executive council of Vancouver Island from 1864 for Victoria District. He retired from politics in 1868.

From his retirement, he carried on his farm and worked as a justice of the peace. In 1887, he and his son Frederick Bernard Pemberton formed J.D. Pemberton and Son, Surveyors, Civil Engineers and Financial Agents, a business which formed the root of a continuing real estate company in Victoria and an investment company in Vancouver. He also imported and bred horses.

Pemberton is interred in Ross Bay Cemetery in the neighbourhood of Fairfield, in Victoria, British Columbia.

== Sources ==
- Lindsay Elms (1996), Beyond Nootka, A Historical Perspective of Vancouver Island Mountains, Misthorn Press: Courtenay, BC, ISBN 0-9680159-0-5
