= John Sebastian Helmcken =

Canadian politician

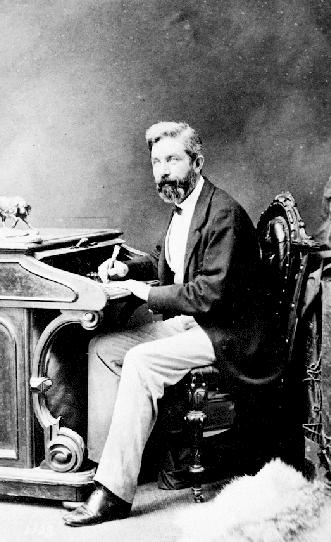
- The Hon. John S. Helmcken, photographed by William J. Topley, circa 1854.

Speaker of the Legislative Council of British Columbia
- In office 1866–1871
- Preceded by: position established
- Succeeded by: James Trimble (Note: As Speaker of the Legislative Assembly of British Columbia.)

Speaker of the Legislative Assembly of Vancouver Island
- In office 1856–1866
- Preceded by: position established
- Succeeded by: position abolished

Personal details
- Born: June 5, 1824 London, England
- Died: September 1, 1920 (aged 96) Victoria, British Columbia
- Spouse: Cecilia Douglas
- Children: Four sons, three daughters: Amilia "Amy" Helmcken (Mrs. McTavish); James "Jimi" Douglas Helmcken; Henry "Harry" Douglas Helmcken; Edith Louisa "Dolly" Helmcken (Mrs. Higgins)
- Parent(s): Claus Helmcken; Catherine Mittler
- Education: Guy's Hospital
- Occupation: Physician, HBC trader, politician

John Sebastian Helmcken (June 5, 1824 – September 1, 1920) was a British Columbia physician who played a prominent role in bringing the province into Canadian Confederation. He was also the founding president of the British Columbia Medical Association.

== Early life ==
John Sebastian Helmcken was born in London, England, the son of ethnically-German parents Claus Helmcken and Catherine Mittler. His education was at St. George's German and English school, and after apprenticing as a druggist and physician, at Guy's Hospital. He was hired aboard the Hudson's Bay Company's Prince Rupert as a ship's surgeon on its 1847 voyage to York Factory, Rupert's Land. After completing his certification at Guy's Hospital, he travelled to India and China. He had intended to join the Navy, but was persuaded instead to join the HBC in 1849 as a physician and clerk to be stationed on Vancouver Island. On the long voyage, smallpox broke out aboard ship, but Helmcken handled the situation ably, and only a single life was lost.

== Vancouver Island ==
Helmcken arrived on Vancouver Island in March 1850 and was posted first to Fort Rupert, where he was soon made a magistrate and tasked with resolving a dispute between the company and the coal-miners there, who wanted to join the California Gold Rush and had gone on strike. Six months later, Chief Factor James Douglas called Helmcken to Fort Victoria to attend the ailing Governor Richard Blanshard, and he settled there permanently. On December 27, 1852, he married Douglas' daughter Cecilia. Douglas was by that time the governor of the colony, and Helmcken had effectively joined what newspaperman Amor de Cosmos called disparagingly the "family-company compact".

In 1856, he was elected to the first Legislative Assembly of Vancouver Island to represent Esquimalt. He served as its speaker until that colony merged with British Columbia in 1866. He continued on as Speaker of the Legislative Council of new colony until Confederation in 1871. By 1863 he had risen to the rank of chief trader within the HBC, and in 1870 Governor Musgrave appointed him to his executive council.

== Confederation ==
Helmcken was in favour of British Columbia joining Canadian Confederation for a while in 1866, but by the time the issue was being seriously debated in 1870, he had dismissed it as impractical and against the financial interests of the colony. He was sometimes accused of supporting annexation to the US. He denied that but stated that "it cannot be regarded as improbable that ultimately, not only this Colony, but the whole of the Dominion of Canada will be absorbed by the United States." Helmcken later summed up his real objection to joining Canada as purely utilitarian: "this Colony had no love for Canada; the bargain for love could not be; it can only be the advancement of material interest which will lead to union."

Despite his opposition to the idea, Helmcken was sent along with Joseph Trutch and Robert Carrall to Ottawa to negotiate terms of confederation with the Canadian government. The terms they negotiated were very favourable to BC; In particular, BC was promised a railway connection with the rest of Canada within ten years and the federal government agreed to assume the colony's sizable debt. Few British Columbians could deny the value of the deal as negotiated by Helmcken, Carrall and Trutch, and British Columbia became a Canadian province on July 20, 1871.

== Later years ==
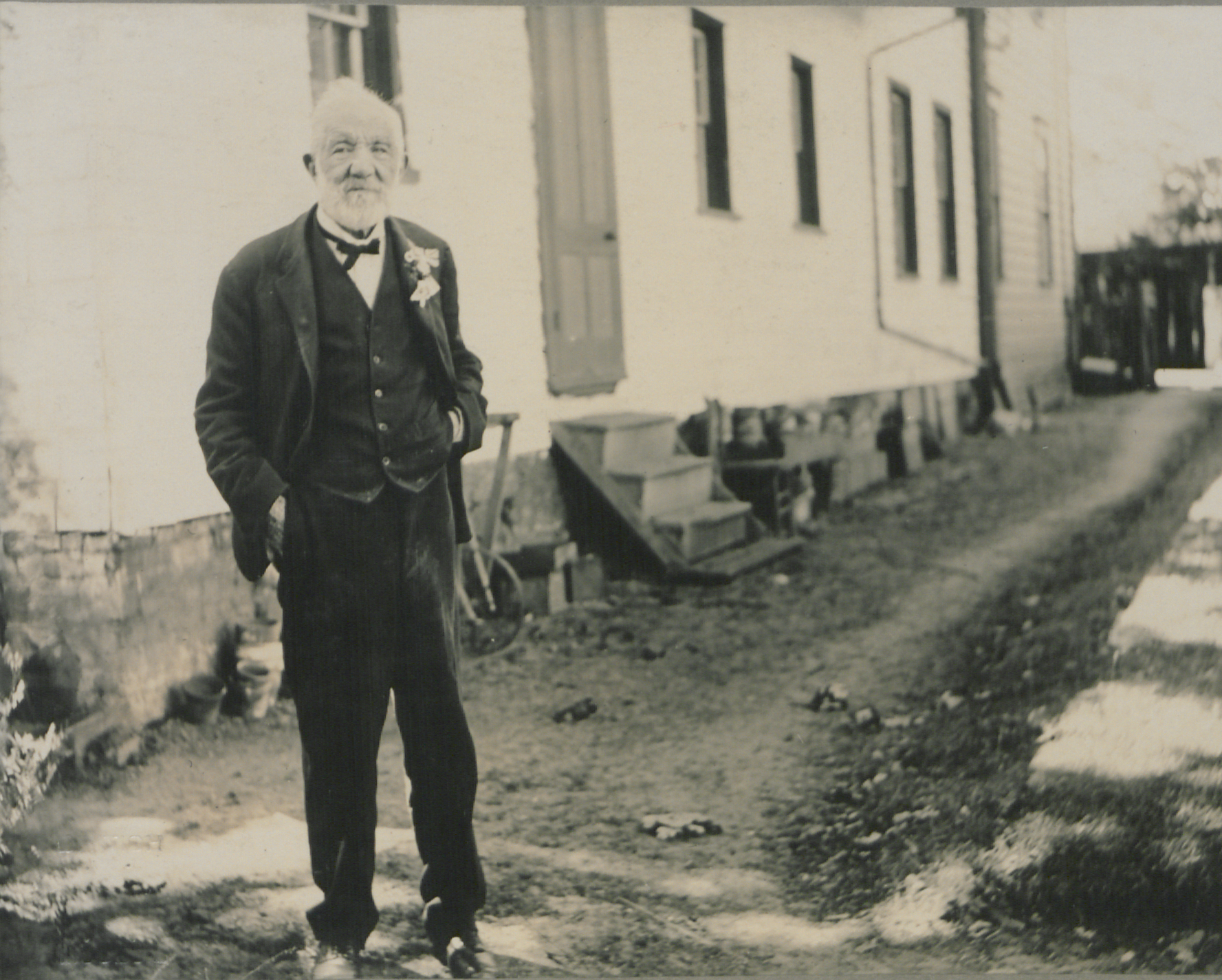
John Sebastian Helmcken in 1917

After Confederation, Helmcken retired from politics, and refused offers of positions as a senator, premier, and lieutenant governor. He did accept an appointment to the board of the Canadian Pacific Railway.

Even as a private citizen, Helmcken remained a respected and influential figure. He had a hand in having the capital of the province moved to Victoria from New Westminster and in securing lucrative public work contracts for Victoria companies. In addition to his role as surgeon for the HBC, Helmcken was founding president of the British Columbia Medical Society in 1885, and helped found the Medical Council of British Columbia, which licences BC doctors, the next year. He was also the physician of the provincial jail and sat on the board of the Royal Jubilee Hospital.

John Helmcken died in Victoria at the age of 96. The house Helmcken built in 1852 and lived in until his death is now a museum located at Thunderbird Park in Victoria. A street in Victoria and one in Vancouver's Yaletown neighbourhood bear his name.

His son Henry Dallas "Harry" served in the British Columbia assembly.

== See also ==
- Statue of John Sebastian Helmcken
