= Fort Victoria (British Columbia) =

Human settlement in Victoria, British Columbia, Canada

Coordinates: 48.42579°N 123.36851°W

- in Victoria, British Columbia, Canada
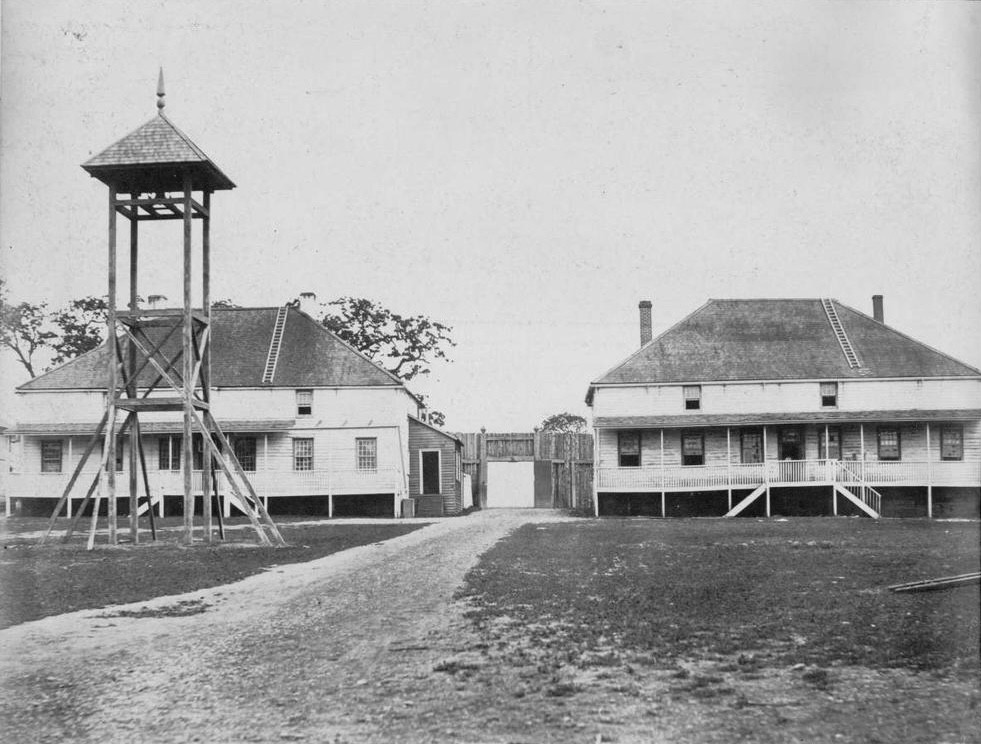
- Fort Victoria circa 1860

Site information
- Type: Fur trading post
- Controlled by: Hudson's Bay Company

Site history
- Built: 1843
- In use: 1843–1864
- Demolished: November 1864

Garrison information
- Past commanders: James Douglas; Roderick Finlayson

National Historic Site of Canada
- Official name: Fort Victoria National Historic Site of Canada
- Designated: 4 June 1924

Fort Victoria began as a fur trading post of the Hudson's Bay Company and was the headquarters of HBC operations in the Columbia District, a large fur trading area now part of the province of British Columbia, Canada and the U.S. state of Washington. Construction of Fort Victoria in 1843 highlighted the beginning of a permanent British settlement now known as Victoria, the capital city of British Columbia.

The fort itself was demolished in November 1864 as the town continued to grow as a commercial centre serving the local area as well as trading with California, Washington Territory, the United Kingdom, and others. The location of Fort Victoria was designated a National Historic Site of Canada in 1924.

== History ==
The original headquarters of HBC operations on the Pacific Coast of North America at the time of Victoria's founding was Fort Vancouver (now Vancouver, Washington) on the lower Columbia River, but its location was difficult to defend, ships often had difficulty entering the mouth of the Columbia, and it was far from the lucrative furs in New Caledonia farther north. With American settlers beginning to come into the region, in 1843, the company sent Chief Factor James Douglas to build a fort some distance north on Vancouver Island and made him its superintendent. The signing of the Oregon Treaty in 1846 settled the matter of Fort Vancouver's further suitability as the United Kingdom gave up its claims in the area to the United States and in return kept Vancouver Island while the Americans dropped their claims north of the 49th parallel.

Erected in 1843 on a site originally called Camosun, a variant of the Lekwungen word "Camossung", the name of a girl turned into stone by the spiritual being Hayls, the Transformer to watch over the resources in what is now known as the Gorge waterway; her name derives from the Camas. The fort was originally named Fort Camosun then became Fort Albert for a short time before 10 June 1843 when, by resolution of HBC's Council of the Northern Department, it was officially named Fort Victoria in honour of Queen Victoria. The fort was built using labour from local First Nations people, who were paid one Hudson's Bay blanket for every 40 pickets they cut. The Songhees people soon established a village across the harbour from the fort. The Songhees' village was later moved to the north shore of Esquimalt Harbour.

In 1844, a dispute led to a gathering of warriors led by Tzouhalem, a Quamichan chief, who peppered the fort with threats and musket balls for two days until the fort's Chief Factor Roderick Finlayson demonstrated the power of the fort's nine-pounder cannon.

In 1849, the Colony of Vancouver Island was established and the HBC was granted exclusive proprietary rights over Vancouver Island. The condition imposed by the Colonial Office was that the company would establish a settlement within five years or see their grant revoked. It was also to spend ninety percent of what it made on land sales on infrastructure such as roads and schools. A town was laid out on the site and made the capital of the colony. London sent Richard Blanshard to be its governor.

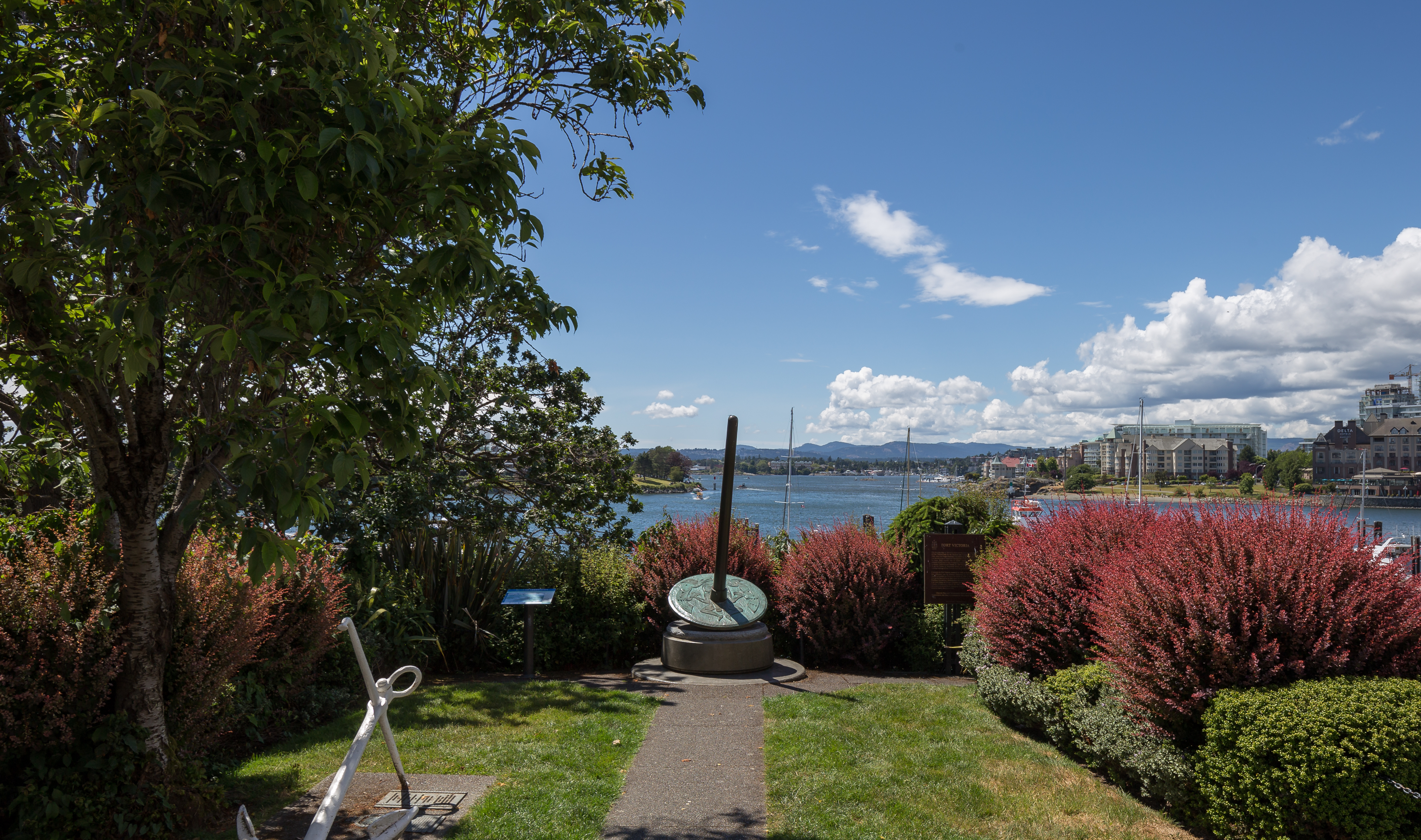
Site where Fort Victoria was situated. The fort was demolished in 1864.

Even as the settlement began to grow, the nature of the company's business was changing. Animal populations were beginning to dwindle from overtrapping, slowing the fur trade, but the California gold rush created a huge demand for resources with few places to buy them on the unsettled west coast. By 1850 there were several sawmills operating at Victoria to feed the hungry California market. The company was soon trading salted salmon with Hawaii and outfitting Royal Navy ships with supplies for the Crimean War.

The Colony prospered and grew with the gold rush and by 1860, a small legislature was formed. However, Governor James Douglas turned down any suggestion of a responsible government.

Chief Factor James Douglas, who remained superintendent of the fort, was made the second governor of the Vancouver Island colony in 1851, and would be the leading figure in the early development of the city until his retirement in 1864, and of the Mainland Colony from 1858 to 1862 when he was replaced as governor of that colony by Frederick Seymour. The fort was demolished in November 1864. In June 1924, the site of the fort was designated a National Historic Site of Canada.

== See also ==
- Bastion (Nanaimo) - a similar structure in Nanaimo

== Sources ==
- Jean Barman, The West Beyond the West: A History of British Columbia, (Toronto: University of Toronto Press, 1991)
- Margaret Conrad and Alvin Finkle, History of the Canadian Peoples: Vol. I—Beginnings to 1867, 4th ed. (Toronto: Person Longman, 2006) and was founded in 1893.
