= Kensington–Cedar Cottage =

- Neighbourhood
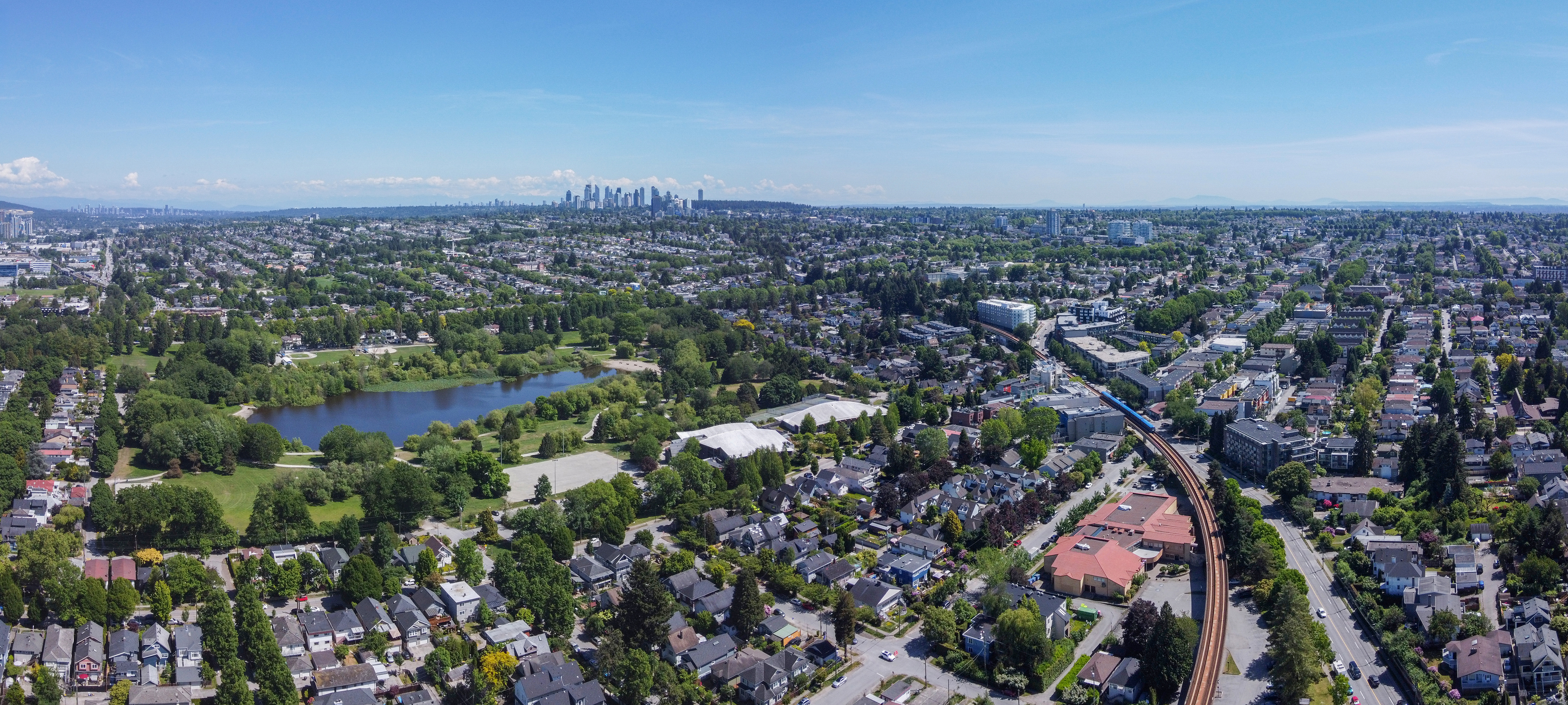
- Aerial view of Kensington–Cedar Cottage in 2026

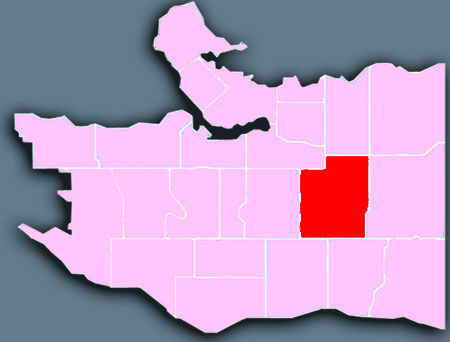
- Location of Kensington-Cedar Cottage in Vancouver
- Coordinates: 49°15′0″N 123°4′33″W
- County: Canada
- Province: British Columbia
- City: Vancouver

Area
  - Land: 7.24 km^{2} (2.80 sq mi)

Population
  - Total: 49,235
  - Density: 6,800.4/km^{2} (17,613/sq mi)

Kensington–Cedar Cottage is one of the most ethnically diverse neighbourhoods in east Vancouver, British Columbia, Canada. The neighbourhood is approximately 7.23 square kilometres (2.79 sq mi) in area.

== Location ==
The neighbourhood is 7.23 square kilometres (2.79 sq mi) in area, and bordered by Fraser St. on the west, Nanaimo St. on the east, 41st Avenue on the south and 16th Avenue and Broadway on the north.

== History ==
The area was first settled in 1888 when Arthur Wilson bought a plot of land and began the Cedar Cottage Nursery.

=== Trout Lake ===
John Hendry Park, named after the lumber industrialist John Hendry who owned the land, is located in the north-east of Kensington–Cedar Cottage. In the centre of the park is Trout Lake, once the water source for the Hastings Sawmill. The park also houses an ice rink, that was built for the 2010 Winter Olympics, and Trout Lake Community Centre.

Like most of East Vancouver, Kensington–Cedar Cottage used to be predominantly working class but rising house prices have made the area increasingly popular with young professionals and families who can no longer afford houses in areas such as the west side.

== Demographics ==
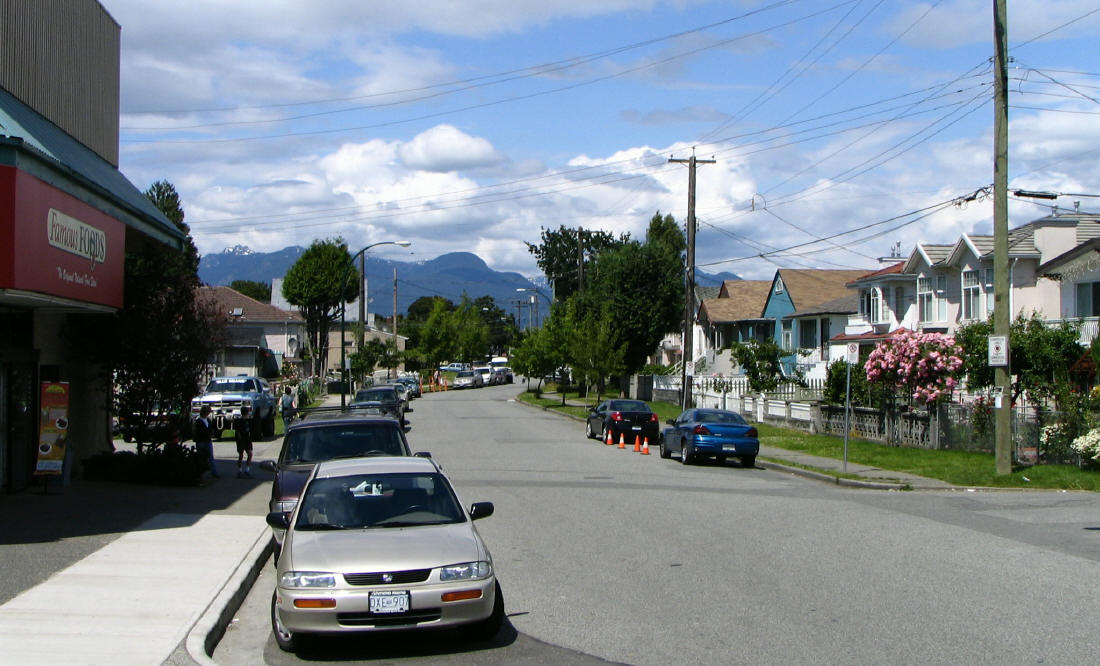
House located at Perry St at Kingsway in 2006

Kensington–Cedar Cottage is younger and more diverse than the rest of the city. Only a third of residents (34.7%) in Kensington–Cedar Cottage speak English as a mother tongue, compared to roughly half of residents in Vancouver as a whole. Chinese languages (Mandarin or Cantonese) are the second most common mother tongues, spoken by 34.1% of residents. The median 2016 family income in Kensington–Cedar Cottage was $77,240, which is lower than the 2016 Vancouver average of $83,845.

Panethnic groups in the Kensington–Cedar Cottage neighbourhood (2001−2016)
Panethnic group	2016		2006		2001	
Panethnic group	Pop.	%	Pop.	%	Pop.	%
European (Note: Statistic includes all persons that did not make up part of a visible minority or an indigenous identity.)	16,745	34.26%	12,670	28.59%	12,470	28.19%
East Asian (Note: Statistic includes total responses of "Chinese", "Korean", and "Japanese" under visible minority section on census.)	16,385	33.53%	17,465	39.41%	18,795	42.49%
Southeast Asian (Note: Statistic includes total responses of "Filipino" and "Southeast Asian" under visible minority section on census.)	8,945	18.3%	8,070	18.21%	6,445	14.57%
South Asian	3,120	6.38%	3,340	7.54%	3,685	8.33%
Indigenous	1,005	2.06%	805	1.82%	680	1.54%
Latin American	735	1.5%	730	1.65%	840	1.9%
African	495	1.01%	335	0.76%	260	0.59%
Middle Eastern (Note: Statistic includes total responses of "West Asian" and "Arab" under visible minority section on census.)	230	0.47%	75	0.17%	315	0.71%
Other/Multiracial (Note: Statistic includes total responses of "Visible minority, n.i.e." and "Multiple visible minorities" under visible minority section on census.)	1,210	2.48%	815	1.84%	745	1.68%
Total responses	48,870	99.08%	44,315	99.22%	44,235	99.27%
Total population	49,325	100%	44,665	100%	44,560	100%
Note: Totals greater than 100% due to multiple origin responses
