= East Vancouver =

East Vancouver East Van
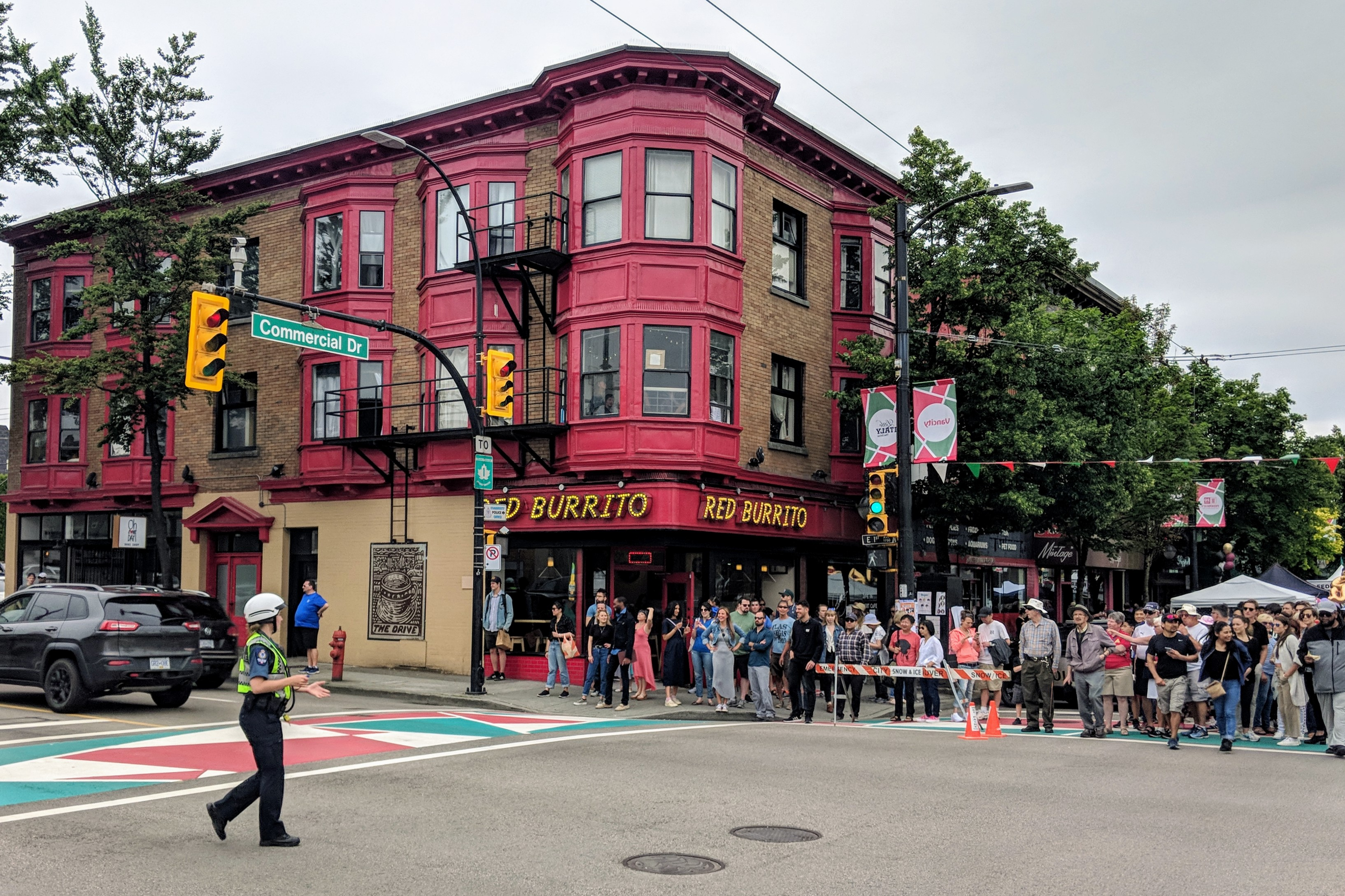
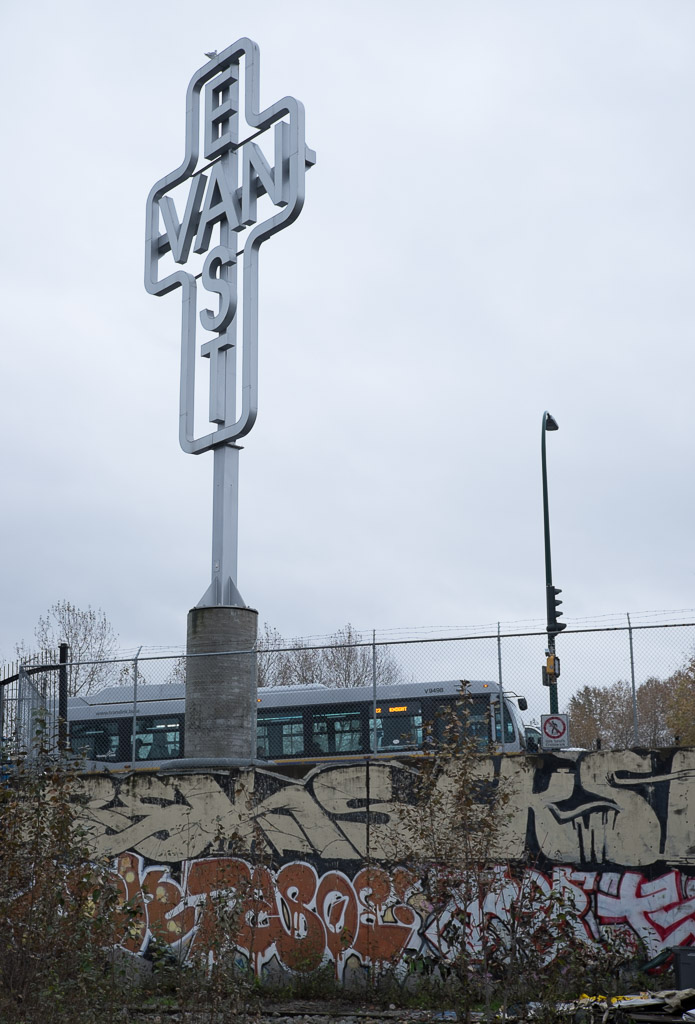
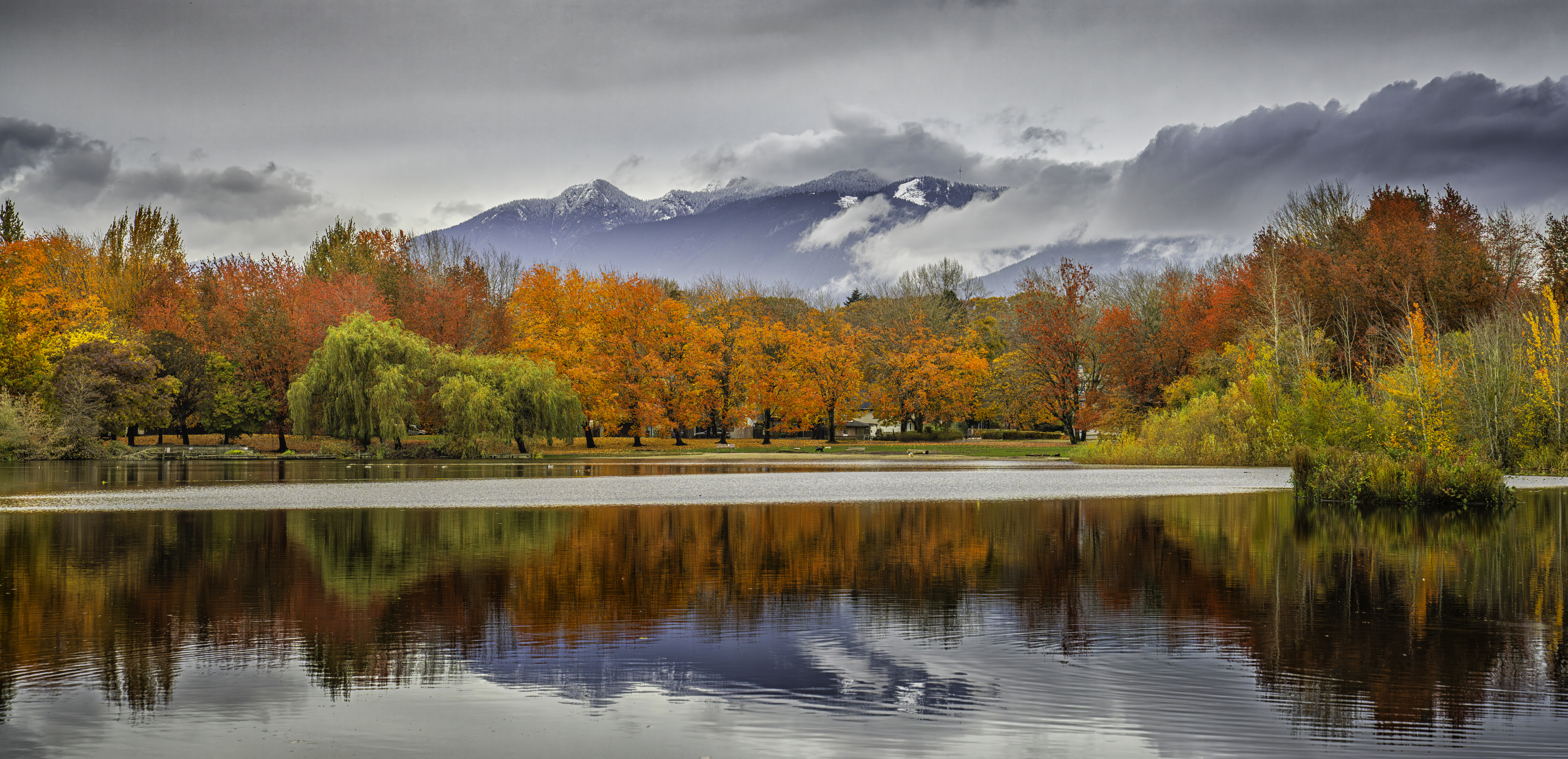
- 1st Ave & Commercial Drive The East Van Cross View from Trout Lake East Vancouver (2018)

- Location in Metro Vancouver
- Coordinates: 49.244°N 123.057°W
- Country: Canada
- Province: British Columbia
- City: Vancouver

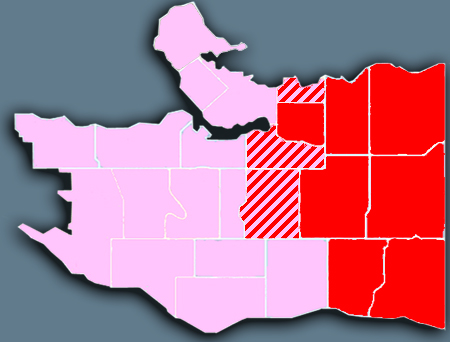
Solid red neighbourhoods are always considered part of East Vancouver, while striped neighbourhoods are sometimes considered part of East Vancouver.

East Vancouver (also called East Van or the East Side) is a region within the city of Vancouver, British Columbia, Canada. Geographically, East Vancouver is bordered to the north by Burrard Inlet, to the south by the Fraser River, and to the east by the city of Burnaby. East Vancouver is divided from Vancouver's "West Side" (not to be confused with the West End of Downtown Vancouver or with West Vancouver municipality) by Ontario Street (although Main Street is often used as the nearest arterial road).

East Vancouver has been the first home for many non-British immigrants since the 1880s. Historically, it was also a more affordable area and traditionally the home for much of Vancouver's working-class populace, in contrast to its wealthier upper and commercially prosperous middle-class "West Side" counterpart. The East Side is best summarized by its diversity – in terms of family income, land use, ethnicity and mother tongue. The rapid increase in housing prices and gentrification may be affecting diversity of the area.

== History ==
=== Colonization: 1860–1945 ===
In 1860, the False Creek Trail was built alongside a trail used by Indigenous peoples to connect False Creek with New Westminster, traversing the region of East Vancouver. The first colonial settlement in the current Metro Vancouver area appeared in 1865 in what is now Strathcona, Vancouver's first neighbourhood. Similarly to the present, Strathcona was known simply as the "East End". In the 1880s, colonists built homes in what is now Mount Pleasant.

Construction of North Arm Road (now Fraser Street) began in 1872 to allow farmers to bring their produce to market from the north arm of the Fraser River. Later, in 1890, a railway linked South Vancouver and Mount Pleasant. Besides agriculture, canneries were a major employer for many residents in the 1880s and 1890s.

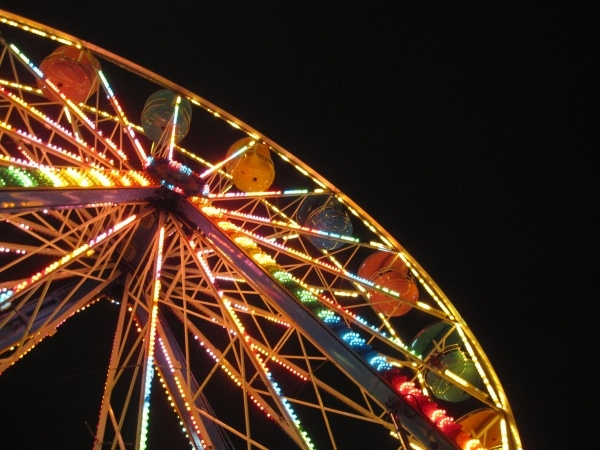
A Ferris wheel at the current Pacific National Exhibition (PNE) during its annual Fright Nights, around Halloween

In 1886, the City of Vancouver was incorporated, comprising much of East Vancouver. One exception was the municipality of South Vancouver, created in 1892, which was an independent municipality until 1929. In 1888, the provincial government designated 65 hectares of land adjacent to modern Hastings Street as a park, now known as Hastings Park. Since 1907, the park has been home to the Pacific National Exhibition.

Transportation infrastructure expanded during the 1890s. In 1891, four public houses opened along Kingsway to service stagecoaches and carriages. Hourly tramcar service began operating along a right-of-way parallel to and crossing where the False Creek Trail had existed. In 1913, it was paved and renamed Kingsway. By the 1920s, street car service was installed along the full length of what is now designated Main Street.

Development of the area increased during the turn of the century. In 1893, a small cedar cottage was built near present-day Kingsway and Knight Street. In 1900, the Cedar Cottage Brewery was built near this location and the surrounding area is still known as "Cedar Cottage". In 1911, a municipal hall was built at the intersection of East 41st Avenue and Fraser Street, while the Hastings Sawmill lands were sold to the local working class. In the following year, John Oliver High School was built nearby. The Collingwood Free Library also opened in the neighbourhood. This library was built largely due to donations from a local resident, John Francis Bursill, who wrote for local newspapers under the name "Felix Penne".

Electricity was first provided to South Vancouver in 1914, with one of the first street lights in Vancouver being installed at East 48th Avenue and Nanaimo Street. In the aftermath of the First World War, a building boom occurred in many areas of East Vancouver, resulting in much of the region being occupied by single-family housing by the 1940s.

John Hendry Park was established to contain Trout Lake in 1926 when Mrs. Aldene Hamber purchased and donated the land to the City of Vancouver in order to prevent it from conversion to a municipal landfill. A condition of the donation was that the park be named after her father, John Hendry, and maintained by the city government.

In 1939, King George VI and Queen Elizabeth visited Vancouver, traveling in a royal procession down Knight Street, and making an unplanned stop in the neighbourhood of Collingwood.

=== After World War II ===
In 1947, many farmers were displaced in South Vancouver to open residential land for returning World War II veterans and their families.

During the 1950s, residents requested that the city government clear vegetation around Trout Lake to prevent skinny dipping. Tram service in the Lower Mainland was terminated in 1954 due to increasing automobile ownership and bus service. In 1955, an editorial in The Province implied that it favoured large areas of Strathcona and Chinatown being demolished in favour of new development.

In the 1960s, sidewalk paving was completed in East Vancouver, three decades after wooden planked sidewalks were removed. In the late 60s, Non-Partisan Association mayor Tom "Terrific" Campbell advocated a freeway that would demolish much of Chinatown. Campbell also advocated demolishing the historic Carnegie Centre and building a luxury hotel at the entrance of Stanley Park. In 1967, a US-based firm proposed a waterfront freeway, which would have required that 600 Strathcona houses be demolished and a 10-metre-high overpass be built over the centre of Chinatown. Widespread protest, including a crowd of 800 people who protested the proposals at City Hall, led to the resignation of the chairman of the city's planning commission and the end of the proposal a year later.

- 1971 – Strict development regulations were passed to limit development in Chinatown and save the architectural heritage. This also preserved the community from proposed massive freeway projects.
- 1972 – Vancouver city mayor Thomas Campbell (NPA) was defeated by Art Phillips of (The Electors Action Movement). Phillips and TEAM campaigned on rehabilitating Gastown, whereas the NPA slate tended to strongly support the failed freeway project through East Vancouver.
- 1985 – The SkyTrain rapid transit system (current Expo Line) was built to connect downtown Vancouver to Surrey and included five stations in East Vancouver.
- 1986 – The City hosted a World's Fair (Expo 86) on the old rail yard properties at False Creek. Residential densification began to accelerate in this area.

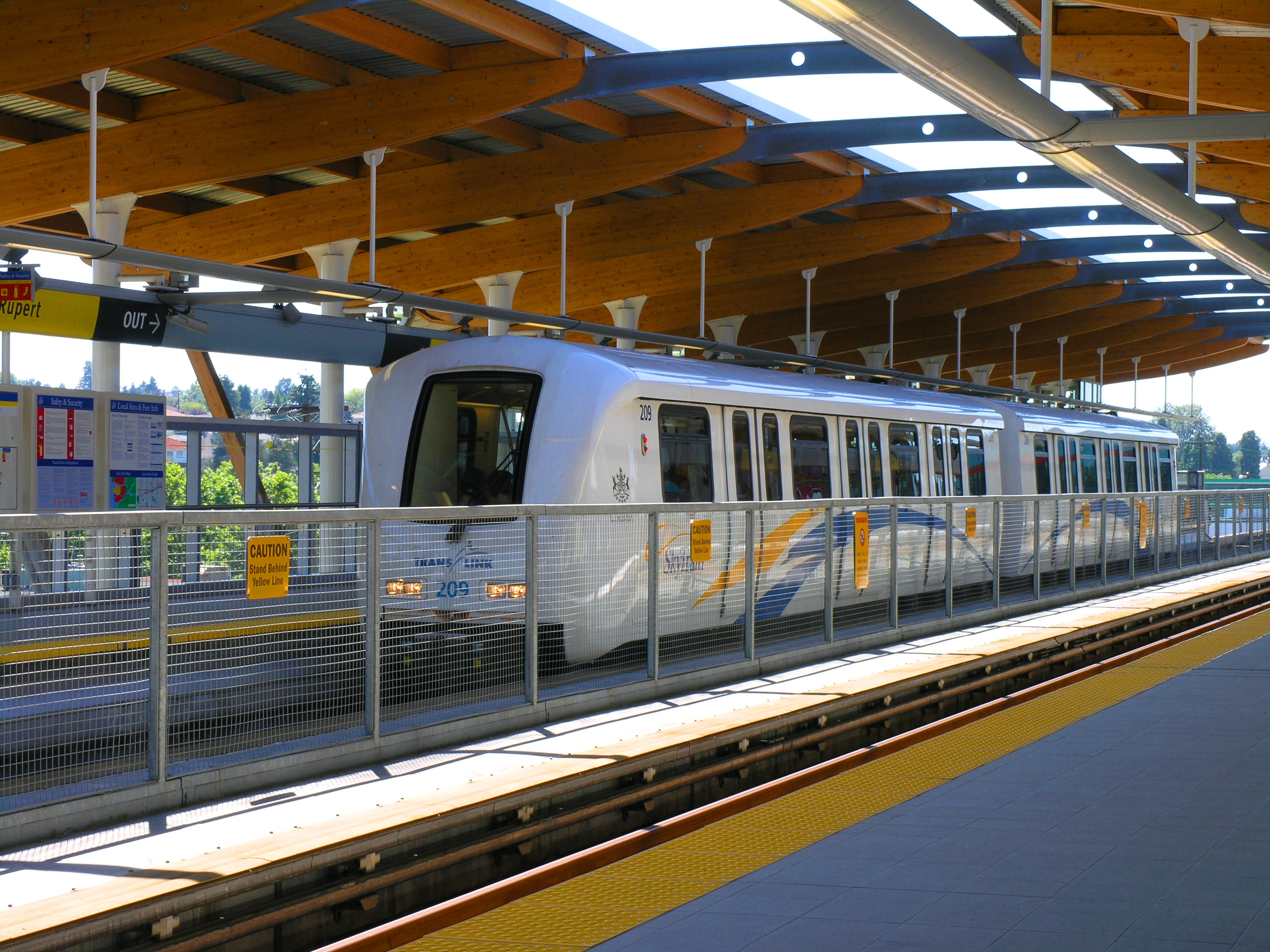
A SkyTrain vehicle on the Millennium Line in East Vancouver

- 1986 to 1993 – The Non-Partisan Association returned to Vancouver City Hall, with former realtor and businessman Gordon Campbell as mayor. The NPA worked more closely with developers, passing a series of pro-development by-laws. Many seniors and poor renters are evicted from properties throughout the city, including Gastown.
- 1994 – The lease expired on the Pacific National Exhibition grounds at Hastings Park. Extensions were granted by Vancouver City Council. The final year for the Exhibition was to be 1997, 100 years after it started operating in Hastings Park.
- 2002 – The SkyTrain's Millennium Line opened, providing new rapid transit service through East Vancouver.
- 2004 – The provincial government transferred authority for the PNE to the City of Vancouver. A consultation process was initiated to determine a new future for the PNE in Hastings Park.

== Neighbourhoods, demographics and languages ==
The 2001 census identified almost 550,000 in the city of Vancouver (Metro Vancouver had about 2.25 million residents).

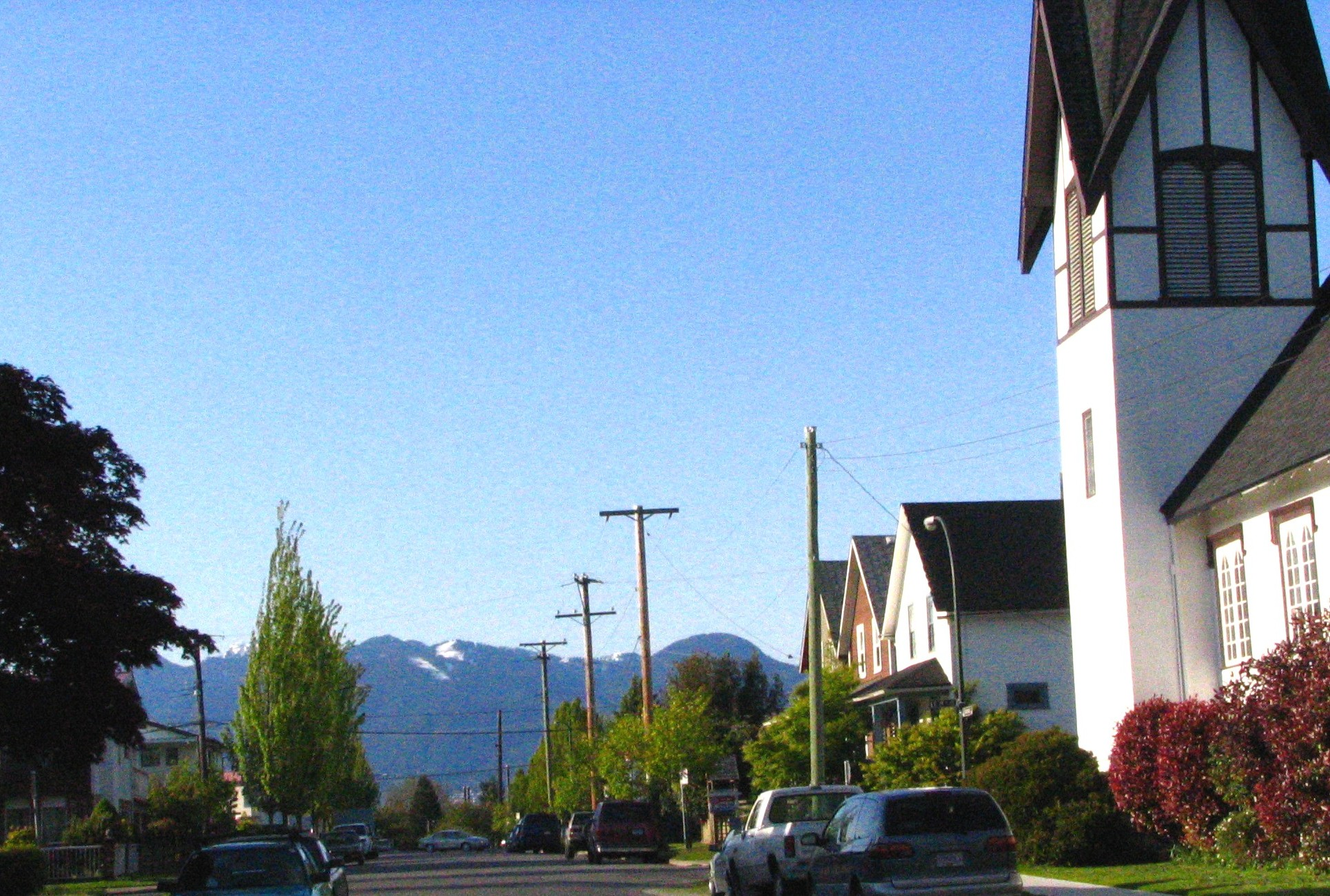
Street and houses in East Vancouver (with North Shore Mountains in background)

The City of Vancouver identifies seven communities as being entirely in the East Vancouver area: Grandview–Woodland, Hastings–Sunrise, Kensington–Cedar Cottage, Killarney, Renfrew–Collingwood, Strathcona and Victoria–Fraserview. The 2001 census identified 220,490 people living in these communities (approximately 40% of the city's population).

Two communities, Mount Pleasant and Riley Park–Little Mountain, straddle both East Vancouver and the West Side.

Two communities are part of East Vancouver but often referred to separately because of their unique place in the city's fabric: the Downtown Eastside and Chinatown.

In addition to East Vancouver, the City of Vancouver is made up of the West End, Downtown, Downtown Eastside, and West Side. The Downtown area is further differentiated into Coal Harbour, Yaletown, Gastown, and other semi-distinct regions.

While the overall mother tongue in the City of Vancouver is 49% English and 26% Chinese (2001), areas of East Vancouver represent a more diverse ethnic population (e.g. residents of Victoria–Fraserview identified their mother tongue as 27% English and 49% Chinese). Note that all other mother tongues (e.g., Punjabi) were identified by fewer than 3% each of the city's population.

== Community identity ==
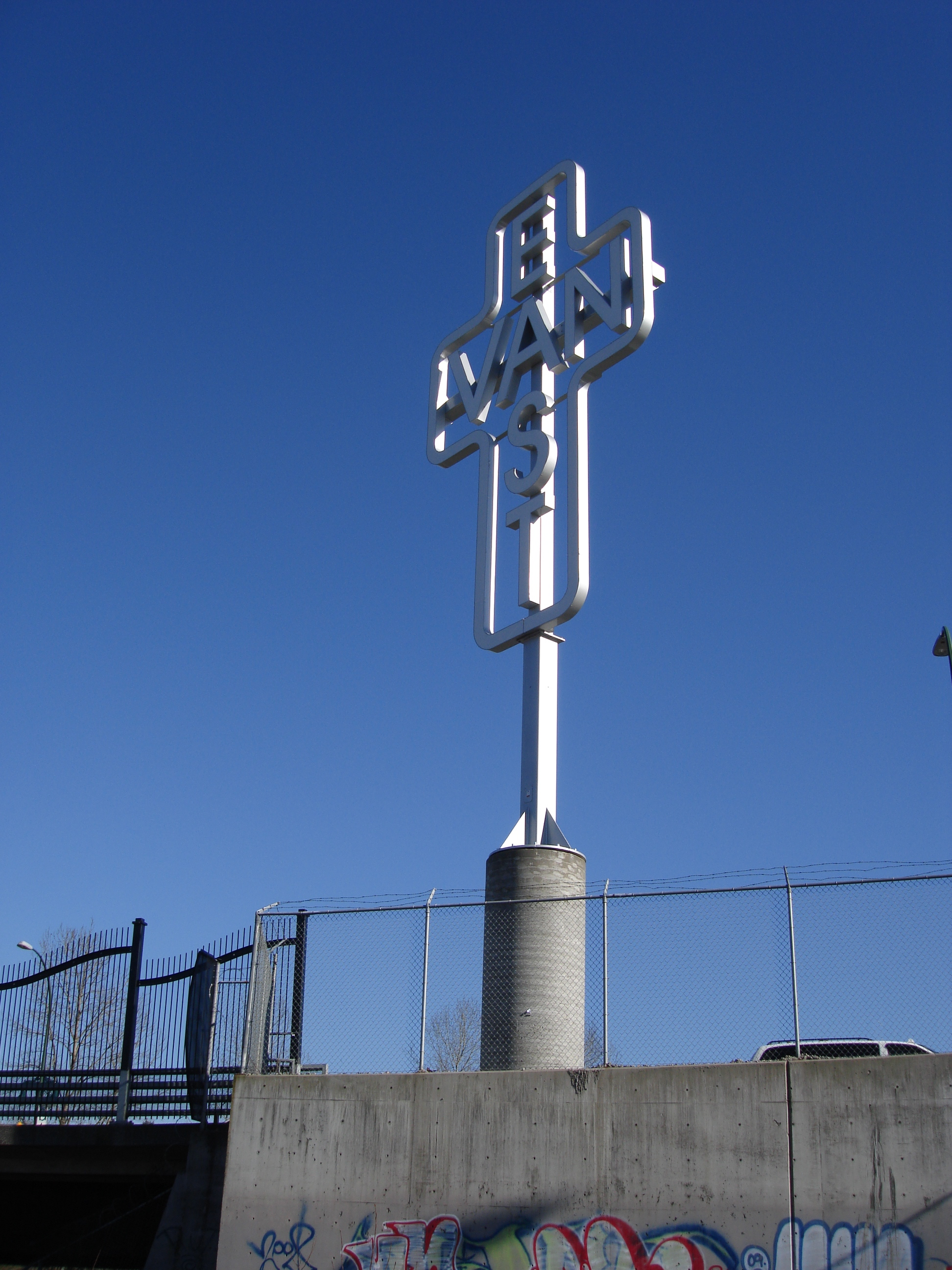
Monument for East Vancouver by Ken Lum, inspired by East Van Cross graffiti

East Vancouver is a diverse urban community, with many ethnic communities, and arts scene. The political identity of the community is highlighted by newspapers such as the Republic of East Vancouver newspaper (the name of which invokes a long-time joking reference to the left-leaning nature of the community and its labour history) and frequent political and social activism – such as the Commercial Drive Car Free Festival and protests.

The artistic identity is reinforced by events at the Vancouver East Cultural Centre, a community poetry anthology ("East of Main"), the Eastside Culture Crawl, and "the Drift", an annual event where local artists present their work centred around Main Street.

While many East Vancouver residents are proud of the diversity in their community, some perceive a long prejudice against East Side neighbourhoods. These concerns include the protests against the 1960s effort to push a freeway through (and over) parts of the East Side, to a perception that municipal spending and planning favours (Note: Select letters to the editor from East Side residents about perceived east-west bias: Some believe this bias is no longer relevant.) other areas of the city (especially the West Side), to recent debates, such as expansion of the Port of Vancouver operation in East Vancouver and the expansion of the Port Mann bridge and predicted increased traffic through the East Side. Mayor Sam Sullivan's plans for increased population in Vancouver with "ecodensity" includes coach houses and densification plans via zoning changes mainly for the East Side, with few plans to change zoning or densify the West Side.

== Ethnic communities ==
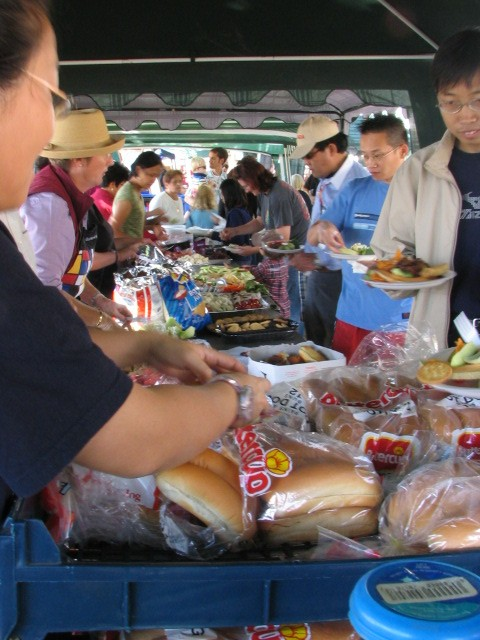
Annual Dickens Community Multicultural Festival in East Vancouver

Immigrant waves that passed through East Vancouver include English, Welsh, Irish, Scottish, Italians, German, Eastern European, Chinese, Southeast Asian, and South Asian.

=== European ===
Early settlers of European ancestry in East Vancouver were largely Irish, English, Scottish and Welsh. Today, evidence of these early settlers from Britain and Ireland is found in places such as the Cambrian Hall (built 1929) for the first Welsh Society in Vancouver (est. 1908). Modern British/Irish communities are still active in East Vancouver today, notably at the WISE Hall ("WISE" is an acronym for Welsh-Irish-Scottish-English) and the Vancouver Irish Céili Society.

Italian immigrants formed the first "Little Italy" in the Main Street area by 1910 and then the Commercial Drive area in the 1950s (where Italian businesses and residents are still plentiful). An Italian Cultural Centre opened nearby on the Grandview Highway in the 1970s. Italian commercial and cultural life is also prevalent on Hastings around Nanaimo, and from there eastwards into the Burnaby Heights region of North Burnaby.

While Greek immigrants mostly moved to Vancouver's West Side (e.g. Hellenic Cultural Community Centre on Arbutus Street) there were also strong Greek communities in East Vancouver, particularly near Boundary Road (which divides Vancouver from the eastern municipality, Burnaby). The number of Greek immigrants to Vancouver doubled in the 1960s, although this has declined steadily since the late 1960s.

Other visible European communities that have settled in East Vancouver include Polish (e.g. the Polish Veterans Association Meeting Hall on Kingsway, the Polish Hall on Fraser Street), German (Vancouver Alpen Club/Deutsches Haus on Victoria Drive at E. 33rd), Croatian (the Croatian Cultural Centre near Trout Lake, the Croatian Catholic Church on 1st Avenue) and Hungarian (the Hungarian Cultural Society's center on Kingsway at Fraser, and the St. Elizabeth of Hungary Catholic Church on E. 7th at Commercial Drive).

=== East Asian ===
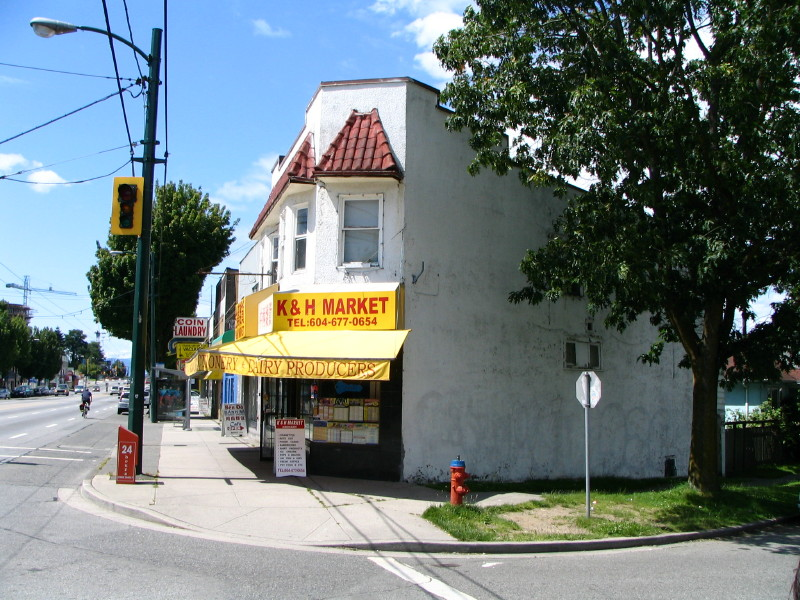
Corner store at Miller & Kingsway

A Chinese community existed before Vancouver was incorporated (1886) and shortly after that date became established at today's Chinatown in the eastern part of Downtown Vancouver. Chinese immigration to the city grew significantly after 1947 when racial immigration exclusion laws were removed by the BC Government.

From the 1980s, many Chinese immigrants chose to live outside of Chinatown, including elsewhere in East Vancouver (e.g. Kingsway St. and Victoria Dr. areas) and Richmond. Immigrants from China, Hong Kong, and Taiwan began to move to the Vancouver area in significant numbers from the 1990s. Hong Kong immigrants who were concerned about the transfer of the territory from the United Kingdom to China were among the wealthiest of these immigrants, in contrast to previous waves of Chinese immigrants, and typically moved to non-Chinese communities in the city's wealthier and commercially prosperous upper-class West Side or in wealthier neighbourhoods elsewhere located throughout the Metro Vancouver area.

East Asian communities are served in East Vancouver by the Cantonese Families Mutual Sharing and Support Group.

=== Southeast Asian ===
A wave of immigrants from Southeast Asian countries (e.g. Indonesia, Malaysia, Philippines, Singapore, Vietnam) have moved to East Vancouver since the 1970s. Although many of these new immigrants have since relocated to City of Richmond as part of the "Asia West" movement. Kingsway Street in East Vancouver has many Southeast Asian businesses, such as Vietnamese restaurants, cafes and beauty parlours. In 2003, about 5% of Vancouver's students speak Vietnamese as their first language. The Vietnamese Seniors Outreach Program on Commercial Drive serve the Southeast Asian community in East Vancouver.

=== South Asian ===
South Asians have been present in Vancouver since at least 1897. In the 1960s, a wave of South Asian immigration (primarily Punjabi) passed through east Vancouver. In the following years, many of the new immigrants presided over the large scale development of the Vancouver Special throughout southeast Vancouver. As most residential development in southeast Vancouver ceased in the 1980s, these homes continue to be a mainstay into the present day.

Since the 1990s, increasing numbers of Vancouver's South Asian residents have since relocated to other areas of Greater Vancouver and the Fraser Valley, particularly Surrey and Abbotsford. Nevertheless, many South Asians continue to live in Vancouver and choose not to move. Established in the 1960s, the Punjabi Market (Little India), located in South Vancouver, continues to act as a hub for the South Asian community across Greater Vancouver. The Sunset neighbourhood in southeast Vancouver contains the highest concentration of ethnic South Asians in the city, forming the largest ethnic group in the neighbourhood at 33.6%.

There are also a group of other Indians from Fiji, Sri Lanka, Bangladesh, and Trinidad that continue to reside in Vancouver.

=== Hispanic and Latin American ===
The Latin American community in East Vancouver is served by the Canadian Latin American Cultural Society on Commercial Drive.

== Key shopping areas ==
=== Kingsway ===
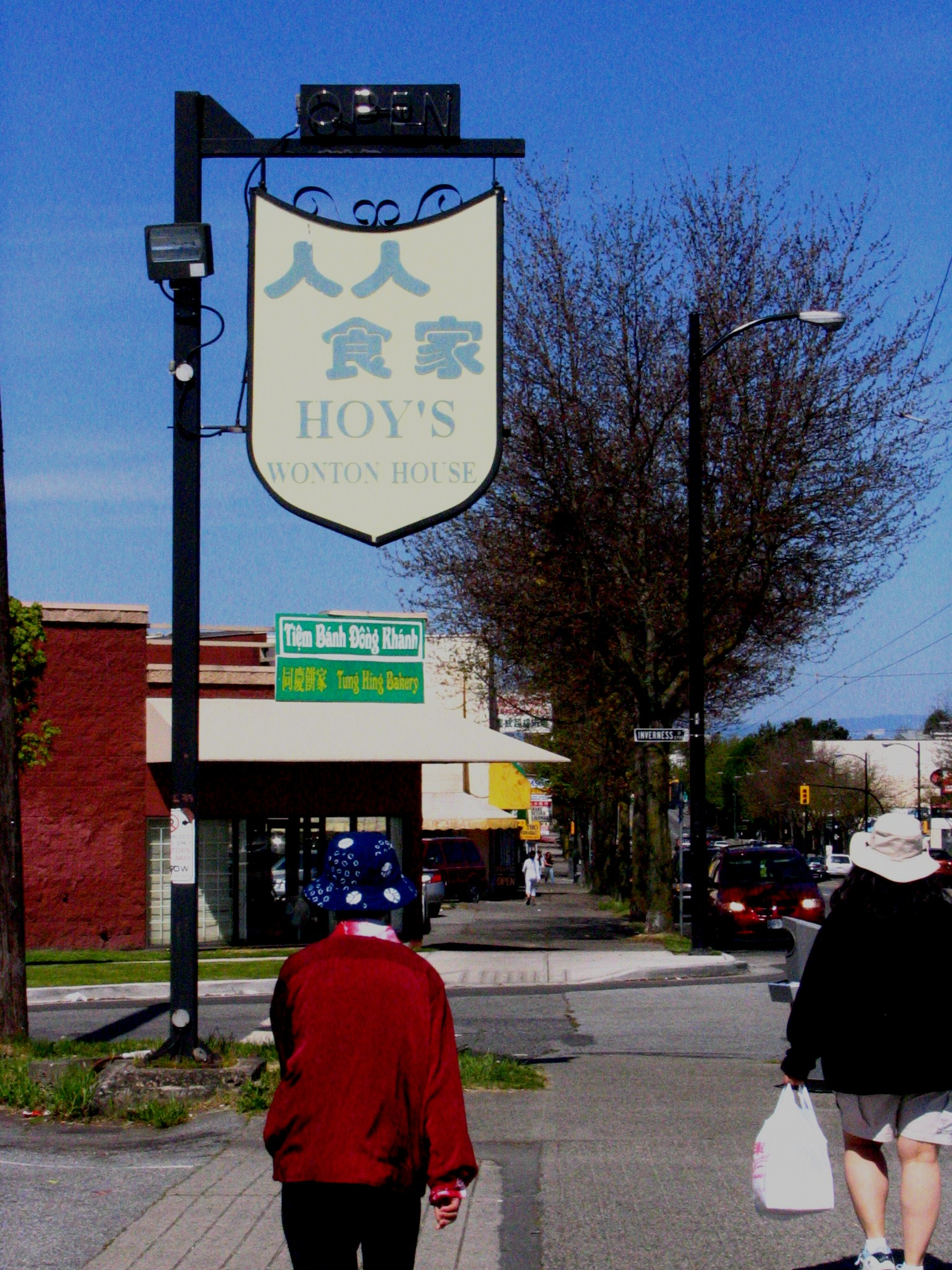
Chinese and Vietnamese eateries along Kingsway

Kingsway was built on an ancient aboriginal footpath and is the historic connector between the early cities of New Westminster and Vancouver (Kingsway was originally named the "Westminster Road").

Today, it is one of the longer streets in the Greater Vancouver area (connecting Vancouver, Burnaby and New Westminster). Its length and varied services make it difficult to characterize; common businesses include diverse ethnic restaurants/cafés, specialty grocery stores, and many others.

Key shopping areas along Kingsway in East Vancouver include SoMa (South Main), Kesington-Cedar Cottage (From Fraser to Nanaimo streets) and Renfrew-Collingwood. There are many Vietnamese restaurants and shops along this corridor and it has aptly been named "Little Saigon" between Fraser and Nanaimo Street along Kingsway. The name "Little Saigon" was also up for debate.

=== Main Street ===
Main Street north of Keefer is effectively part of the Downtown Eastside and includes the former headquarters of the Vancouver City Police and the Vancouver Pre-Trial Centre. Adjoining side-streets are largely small industry and warehouse, though verging quickly on Gastown to the west and Japantown to the east.

Main Street between Keefer and Prior is part of Chinatown. This area has many Chinese businesses, particularly restaurants, small pottery and furniture stores, financial establishments, clothing stores and others. These businesses also extend to the east and the west of Main Street in this area. A popular Chinese New Year parade is held each year in this area.

Main Street is the core of the Mount Pleasant neighbourhood between East 2nd/Great Northern Way and East 16th avenues. This area is known for a younger, hip demographic. Common businesses include cafés, grocery stores, pubs, vintage clothing stores, independent media stores. There are fewer recent immigrants in this area and it is also much more influenced by people in their 20s and 30s.

==== Mid-Main ====
The area of Main Street between East 17th and East 41st Avenues is dominated by antique stores, restaurants, bars, cafés, clothing stores, bookstores, grocery stores, and independent video stores.

The South Asian District, or Punjabi Market is between E 45th to E 51st avenues.

Southeast Marine Drive, between E 65th Avenue and SE Marine Drive and south to E Kent Avenue, has industrial and highway oriented retail.

=== Fraser Street ===
Fraser Street has two main shopping areas; a multi-ethnic (Chinese, Vietnamese, Filipino, Russian area) between East 24th and East 28th Avenues. A predominantly Indian district is present between East 43rd and East 50th Avenues; one of Vancouver's several "Punjabi Markets". Street signs in the area of Main & 49th carry the city designation "Little India".

=== Commercial Drive ===
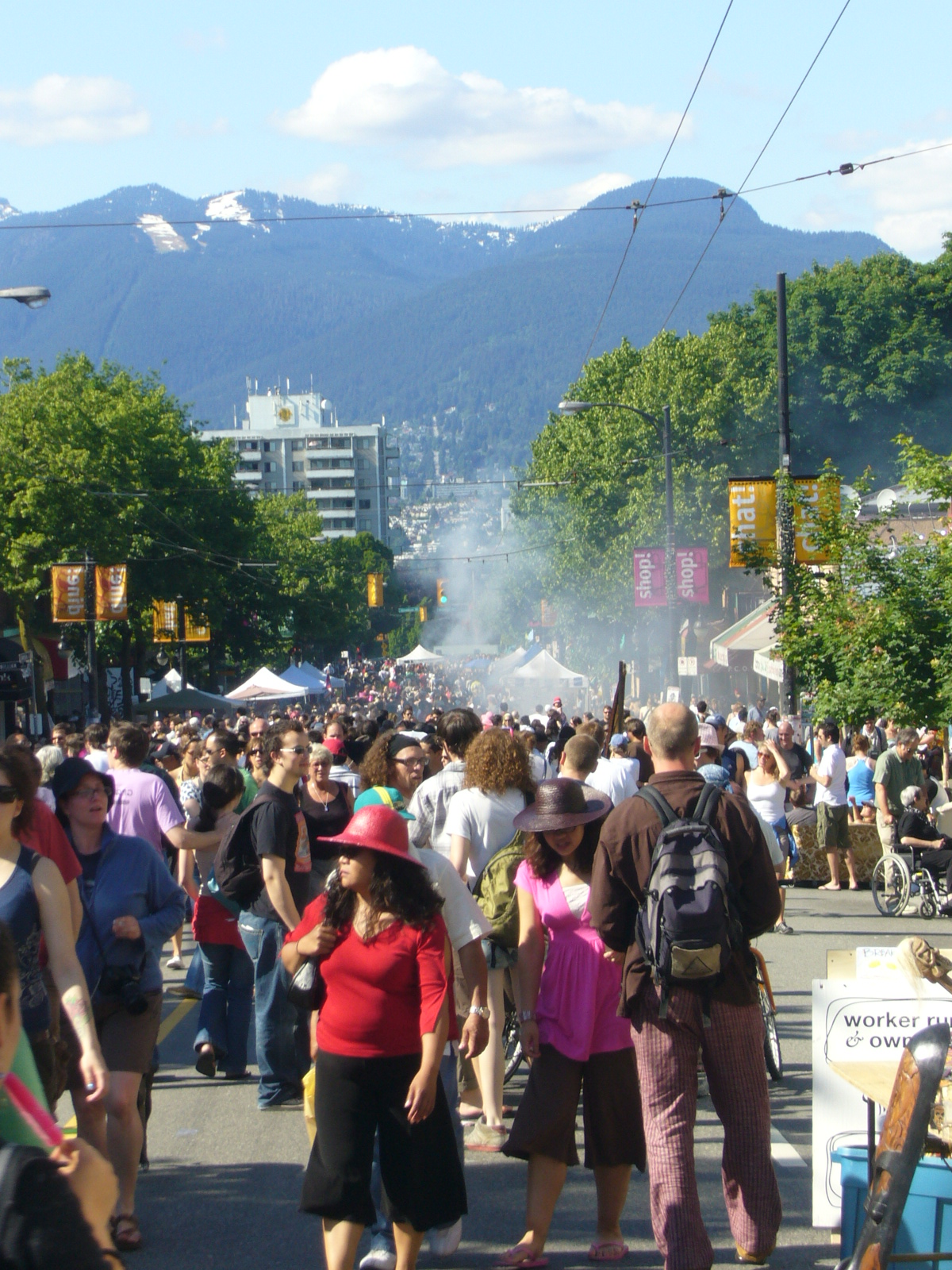
Car-Free Day Festival on Commercial Drive, June 2008

Commercial Drive (between Wall to E 17th Avenue) is one of the most vibrant areas of the Greater Vancouver region due to it strong multi-ethnic and activist identities, including the LGBTQ communities. Culturally, this area is defined by the historic Italian and Portuguese communities, which developed a "Little Italy" here in the 1950s. Since that time, immigrants from Latin America, Asia, the Caribbean, Middle East and elsewhere mix with a strong aboriginal community to form a dynamic neighbourhood. Many residents from elsewhere in the city come to this area for shopping (e.g. Italian cheeses), restaurants, bars, cafés and the arts.

=== Victoria Drive ===
Victoria Drive, between East 36th and East 54th Avenues, comprises a large Chinese community with many restaurants, grocery stores, and other services.

Victoria Drive, between Hastings Street and 1st Avenue, is characterized by community gardens, village corner stores, plant shops, and 100-year-old heritage home. Many older homes have been painted and have been remodelled to look similar to their appearance in the last century.

=== Hastings Street ===
Hastings Street extends east from downtown Vancouver through Burnaby and passes through several commercial districts. The area near downtown and Chinatown is characterized by a population of low-income residents, individuals experiencing homelessness, and people struggling with substance use, alongside a community of social activists. Local businesses in this section include pawn shops and single-room occupancy hotels, and the area is known for a prominent informal drug market.

Further east between Clark and Nanaimo, the street's commercial presence includes marine and transport services, as well as artist studios and the infamous "chicken factories" which sometimes permeate the area with their characteristic odour. Between Nanaimo and Boundary Road is the Hastings Sunrise area, a busy commercial area of Asian and European shops and restaurants, as well as banks and other services.

== Housing, affordability and gentrification ==
In May 2007, the typical housing ("benchmark") price of a single-detached house in East Vancouver was $627,758 (a 9% increase over the previous year and a 90% increase over the previous five years). Many home owners in East Vancouver rent out their basement suites to assist with mortgage payments.

Increased housing prices are causing changes in East Vancouver neighbourhoods, such as fewer new immigrants moving to the area and decreasing affordability for artists, seniors, young families and others.

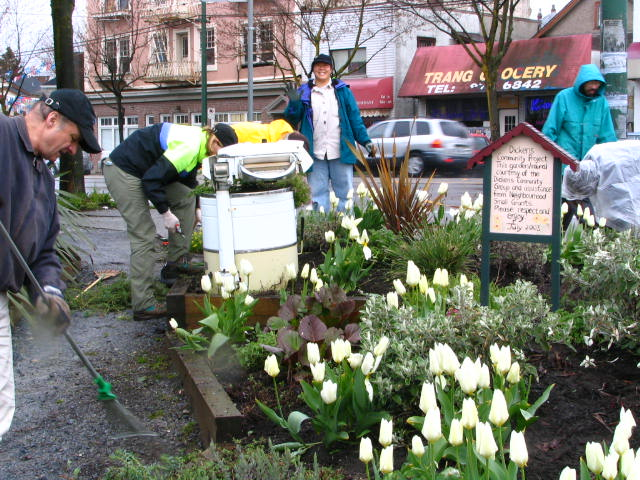
Resident-led volunteer project to create green spaces and improve a neighbourhood in East Vancouver

However, increased housing prices have also caused significant positive changes in East Vancouver, such as greater retention of existing residents (partly due to a lack of affordability in some other areas), increased densification (increasing the number of affordable housing options, e.g. townhouses), more residential investment, neighbourhood-led artistic projects, more community-pride events (e.g. neighbourhood clean-ups, block parties and community gardening), and greater tax base for new amenities(e.g. a new planned library and $2.7 million in street, lighting and sidewalk improvements at Kingsway and Knight Street).

Rising prices throughout the city have produced challenges for new social housing projects. This has caused conflict where East Vancouver residents feel that social housing projects are disproportionately located in their communities versus areas in Vancouver's West Side, some of which have no social housing at all (Dunbar, Kerrisdale and Shaughnessy)

Other general Vancouver housing concerns include increasing rental rates due to speculation associated with the Vancouver 2010 Olympics and recent provincial economic growth.

In January 2013, the leaseholders of the Waldorf Hotel, an East Vancouver institution, were told they must cease operations as of January 20, 2013, by order of the new owner and condo developer, Solterra Group of Companies. After public outcry to save the land, building and cultural institution, Mayor Gregor Robertson issued a public statement decrying the loss, which critics denounced as a sentimental bid for hipster votes.

== Amenities and celebrations ==
Early morning tai chi practitioners are a common sight in East Vancouver parks. Other unique East Side park features include Trout Lake (the only lake in the city), the modern parkgrounds at Hastings Park, the large (38 ha.) and wild Everett Crowley Park, Kensington Park, where many wedding photographs are taken against the stunning backdrop of the city and North Shore Mountains, the bustling Refrew Community Park, the diverse Strathcona Park with its skatepark and climbing wall, and the multi-use Memorial Park, which is dedicated to soldiers who died in WW1 and today provides many spaces for sports teams and neighbours alike. Another park is the Falaise Park on the border of Burnaby and Vancouver.

=== Public celebrations ===
- Chinese New Year Parade on Gore, Keefer, Main and Pender Streets (Late January or early February)
- Baisakhi Day Parade and vegetarian temple feast, near Marine Drive and Fraser Street (mid-April).
- Annual Cedar Cottage Mothers Day Traditional pow wow at John Hendry Park (mid-May).
- East Vancouver Farmers Market
- Commercial Drive Car Free Festival (mid-June)
- Pacific National Exhibition (mid-August to Labour Day)
- East Vancouver Culture Crawl
- Vancouver Fringe Festival, centered on the Commercial Drive area (early September).
- The Drift – Main Street's Annual Art Festival and Open Studio Tour. First weekend in October.
- Mid-autumn Moon Festival at Dr. Sun Yat-sen Garden (late September or early October).
- Powell Street Festival of Japanese-Canadian culture (early August),
- Vancouver Dyke March (1st Saturday of August on Commercial Drive)

== Politics ==
Politically, East Vancouver has often supported left-wing political candidates although demographic changes since the 1990s (e.g. significantly increasing family income levels) may be causing voting patterns to become more diverse. More specifically, the Northern portion of East Vancouver consistently votes for left-wing politicians by large margins, although the Southern areas tend to vote for centre to centre-right candidates.

At the municipal level, East Vancouver is part of the "at large" political system and therefore is represented by all of Vancouver City Council. In the 2008 municipal election, Vision Vancouver became the majority governing party at Vancouver City Hall.

Provincially, East Vancouver includes the constituencies of Vancouver-Kensington, Vancouver-Kingsway, Vancouver-Hastings, Vancouver-Mount Pleasant and Vancouver-Fraserview. In the 2005 provincial election, all constituencies in East Vancouver were won by the British Columbia New Democratic Party except Vancouver-Fraserview, which is represented by the centre-right British Columbia Liberal Party.

Federally, East Vancouver includes the ridings of Vancouver East, Vancouver Kingsway and Vancouver South. In the 2011 federal election, Vancouver East and Vancouver Kingsway were won by the federal New Democratic Party, while the Conservative Party of Canada won Vancouver South. This marked the first time since 1988 that the Tories managed to win a seat in Vancouver.

East Vancouver is home to both of Vancouver's left-wing bookstores. The People's Co-op Bookstore, founded in 1945 with a focus on communist and socialist literature, is Vancouver's oldest bookstore. Spartacus Books, founded in 1973 by an alliance of anarchists, Maoists, and social democrats, is entirely volunteer-run and hosts regular events. It is one of the oldest collectively-run bookstores in North America.

== Education ==
- Sprott Shaw College
- Vancouver Community College
- LaSalle College Vancouver

== Notable residents ==
- Dave Barrett (1930–2018), 26th premier of British Columbia
- Bob Rennie (1956), real estate marketer, art collector

== See also ==
- Government and politics of Vancouver
