= Henry Holbrook =

Canadian politician

Chief Commissioner of Lands and Works of British Columbia
- In office November 14, 1871 – January 12, 1872
- Premier: John Foster McCreight
- Preceded by: position established
- Succeeded by: George Anthony Walkem

Member of the Legislative Assembly for New Westminster City
- In office October 1871 – October 7, 1875
- Preceded by: n/a
- Succeeded by: Robert Dickinson

Member of the Colonial Assembly for Douglas and Lillooet
- In office 1863–1866
- Preceded by: district established
- Succeeded by: assembly dissolved

3rd Mayor of New Westminster President of New Westminster City Council (1962–63, 1867–69)
- In office 1878–1878
- Preceded by: Thomas Robert McInnes
- Succeeded by: W.D. Ferris
- In office 1867–1869
- Preceded by: John Robson
- Succeeded by: William Armstrong
- In office 1862–1863
- Preceded by: John Ramage
- Succeeded by: Robert Dickinson

Personal details
- Born: July 11, 1820 Northwich, Cheshire, England
- Died: May 11, 1902 (aged 81) Parkgate, Cheshire, England

Henry Holbrook (July 11, 1820 – May 11, 1902) was an English-born merchant and political figure in British Columbia. He represented New Westminster City in the Legislative Assembly of British Columbia from 1871 to 1875.

The son of Samuel Holbrook, he was born in Northwich and was educated in Witton, Cheshire. Holbrook entered business as a merchant in Liverpool. He was a contractor during the Crimean War and later lived in Odessa, Ukraine. Holbrook came to Victoria, British Columbia at the start of the Fraser Canyon Gold Rush of 1858. He settled in New Westminster the following year when it became the capital of the Colony of British Columbia, opening a store there. He served as alderman on the municipal council, also serving as president of the council (mayor). In 1864, he ran unsuccessfully to represent New Westminster District in the Colonial Assembly of British Columbia but was elected for Douglas and Lillooet District. Holbrook opposed the union of the colonies of Vancouver Island and British Columbia in 1866, which led to Victoria becoming the capital.

Although he developed some doubts, Holbrook generally supported union with Canada. In 1870, he went to Ottawa as an unofficial delegate to discuss the terms of union. In 1871, he was named Chief Commissioner of Land and Works in the provincial cabinet; he then became president of the Executive Council instead. Holbrook was defeated when he ran for reelection in 1875. In 1880, he returned to England for his health. Although he never returned, Holbrook retained an interest in British Columbia. In 1884, he published British Columbia gold mines; a paper read before the Liverpool Geological Association .... He died at Talbot House in Parkgate at the age of 81.

== Electoral record ==
1871 British Columbia general election: New Westminster City
Party	Candidate	Votes	Elected
Independent	Henry Holbrook	acclaimed	✓
Source: Elections BC

British Columbia provincial by-election, November 1871: New Westminster City Resignation of Henry Holbrook upon appointment to Executive Council
Party	Candidate	Votes	Elected
Independent	Henry Holbrook	acclaimed	✓
Source: Elections BC

1875 British Columbia general election: New Westminster City
Party	Candidate	Votes	%	Elected
Independent-Government	Robert Dickinson	59	60.82	✓
Opposition	Henry Holbrook	38	39.18	
Source: Elections BC
