= James Cunningham (Canadian politician) =

Canadian politician

- James Cunningham, MP

Member of the Legislative Assembly of British Columbia for New Westminster City
- In office April 21, 1884 – July 7, 1886
- Preceded by: William James Armstrong
- Succeeded by: William Norman Bole

Member of Parliament for New Westminster
- In office January 22, 1874 – January 22, 1878
- Preceded by: Hugh Nelson
- Succeeded by: Thomas Robert McInnes

8th Mayor of New Westminster
- In office 1873–1873
- Preceded by: William Clarkson
- Succeeded by: Robert Dickinson

Personal details
- Born: 1 August 1834
- Died: 4 May 1925 (aged 90)
- Political party: Liberal Party of Canada
- Spouse: Mary Ann Woodman (m. 1864)

James Cunningham (August 1, 1834 – May 4, 1925) was a Canadian merchant and Liberal politician, who represented New Westminster in the House of Commons of Canada during the 3rd Parliament from 1874 to 1878.

Born in Anyevny, County Monaghan, Ireland, the son of James Cunningham, he was educated in Anyevny, later coming to Canada and entering business as a merchant in New Westminster. In 1864, Cunningham married Mary Ann Woodman. He resigned his seat in the House of Commons in 1878. He sat as MLA for New Westminster City from 1884 to 1886. In 1873, he also served as the eighth mayor of New Westminster, and was the first person to be elected directly to the position. Cunningham died in New Westminster at the age of 90.

His brother Thomas served in the British Columbia assembly.
