= List of bodies of water in Vancouver =

Vancouver, British Columbia, Canada is home to several bodies of water within and around its boundaries.

Of over 30 historically salmon-bearing streams diverted into underground culverts due to urbanization, several have been restored to a state visible and habitable again by plants and wildlife.

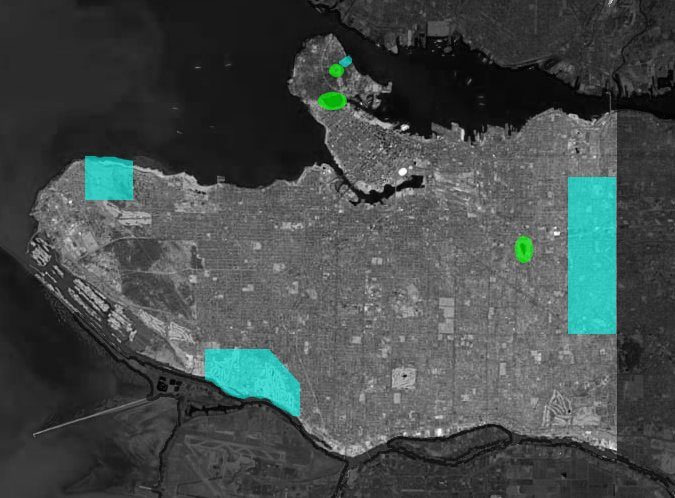
Satellite image with blue and green areas, respectively, covering the areas of flowing and still water described in this article, including affected watersheds and wetlands.

== Spanish Bank Creek ==
Spanish Bank Creek flows north through Pacific Spirit Regional Park near U.B.C. It terminates at the beach under the Spanish Bank cliffs on Northwest Marine Drive. Urban development rendered the creek impassable to adult fish for many decades but the creek has been restored and, since 2001, sockeye salmon been returning there to spawn.

== Musqueam Creek ==
Musqueam Creek, and its tributary Cutthroat Creek, begin in Pacific Spirit Regional Park and flow south through the Musqueam Reserve in the Southlands neighbourhood of Vancouver, where they meet before entering the Fraser River estuary. The creeks are protected by the federal Department of Fisheries and Oceans. Musqueam Creek is in the process of restoration by the Musqueam Band, and Coho salmon and Chum salmon have returned to this creek in small amounts.

== Still Creek ==
Still Creek is a 17 km long creek that begins in Vancouver, crosses into Burnaby, and terminates in Burnaby Lake. In Vancouver, the Still Creek watershed is bounded by 1st Avenue, 49th Avenue, Nanaimo Street, and Boundary Road. Portions of the creek are visible and the City of Vancouver is working to uncover (or "daylight") more of the creek; however, most of the Vancouver section still lies underground, directed by culverts and storm sewers.

== Beaver Creek ==
Beaver Creek begins at Beaver Lake and terminates in the ocean, under a bridge at the intersection of Pipeline Road and Stanley Park Drive.

== Beaver Lake ==
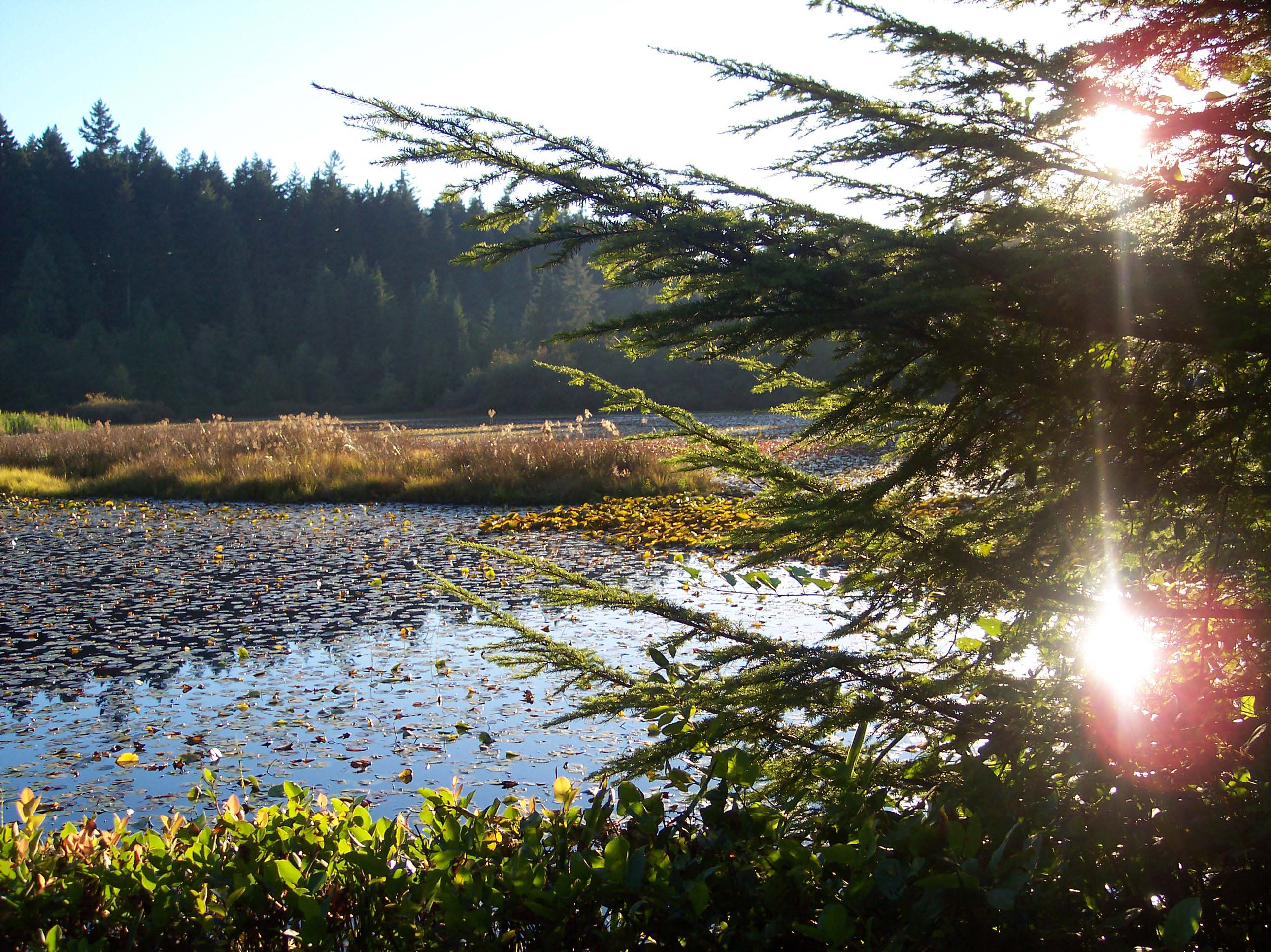
Beaver Lake in Stanley Park.

Beaver Lake is a lake in the interior of Stanley Park, surrounded by walking trails and home to many aquatic birds. This lake is being reclaimed by the forest because of the water lilies that have been added. The lily pads reduce the amount of oxygen in the water, which has slowed the lake's ability to decompose organic material. Due to this, the lake is slowly becoming a swamp.

== Lost Lagoon ==
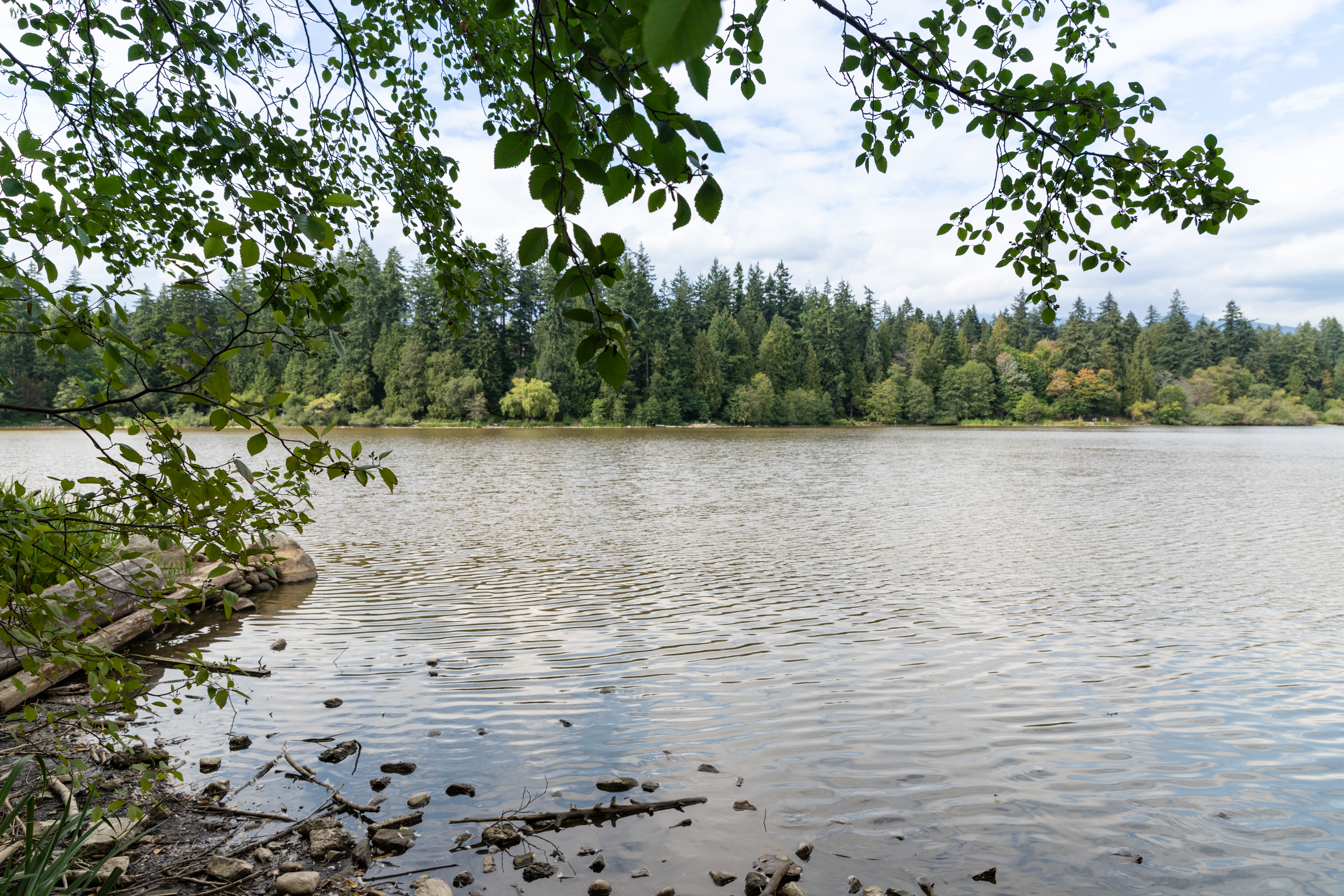
Lost Lagoon, Stanley Park Vancouver

Lost Lagoon is an artificial, captive 17-hectare body of water, west of Georgia Street, near the entrance to Stanley Park. It was created in 1916 by the construction of the Stanley Park causeway. It is a nesting ground for many species of birds, including swans, Canada geese, and great blue heron. East of Lost Lagoon, across Georgia Street, is Coal Harbour, an extension of Burrard Inlet. The lagoon is now landlocked but used to be connected to the inlet, resulting in significant tidal changes along its shores, and at its western end at high tide waves would lap across what is now the Ceperley Park area at Second Beach, which was then just a sandbar. While rare in recent decades, Lost Lagoon can freeze during a cold spell, permitting public ice skating and ice hockey. The lagoon was named by poet Pauline Johnson who liked to go canoeing on the tidal lagoon and one day discovered that it was no longer there due to a low tide.

A large fountain called Jubilee Fountain graces the northeast end of the lagoon, spraying water in the air which can be seen for many blocks. The next controversy surrounding the lake followed the proposal for a fountain to be erected in the lake to coincide with the city's Golden Jubilee anniversary celebrations in 1936. For the mayor, it would be "a miracle of engineering," with the spray of water lit by virtually "limitless combinations" of colour.[9] The public, in contrast, were not impressed by the proposal. Its $33,019.96 price tag was considered extremely frivolous in the midst of an economic crisis. As written in The Sunday Sun Edition of the Vancouver Sun Newspaper, Saturday, August 8. 1936. The lead story in the Magazine section is; SECRETS OF THE FOUNTAIN. It was the conception and idea of then, Chief Electrical Engineer, Robert Harold Williams with Hume and Rumble Ltd. electrical contractors. R.Harold Williams designed and supervised the erection of the Vancouver's Golden Jubilee fountain. After a business trip to Los Angeles he saw a fountain and thought this would be a great gift for the city for their up-and-coming birthday, Golden Jubilee celebration. To build the fountain, Lost Lagoon was drained. Seventy piles were driven into the mud. On these a concrete mat was laid. The fountain was built upon this mat. The work was of necessity rushed; it was done in a month. "The fountain is worthy of all the traditions of art, worthy of Vancouver's Golden Jubilee, and it will be a permanent, decorative joy in Stanley Park". "When operating, it is like a symphony concert, in motion and color instead of music, says Harold Williams, engineer, of Hume & Rumble Ltd., under whose personal supervision the work has been done." Vancouver's Jubilee Committee and private citizens who contributed are to be commended on their work in pushing for this beautiful fountain, which is sure to be one of the major attractions during the Golden Jubilee celebration. "We've had to hurry," says Mr. Williams," in that time 285 tons of cement have been utilized and all the special equipment was built." All equipment was built in Canada and the pumps were constructed in Vancouver. All union labor was employed.[10] It was restored for Expo in 1986.[

== Trout Lake ==
Trout Lake is a popular swimming location and nesting ground to many species of bird. In the late 1800s, Trout Lake was a peat bog that supplied water to Hastings Mill. Trout lake was formerly stocked with rainbow trout and cutthroat trout. Adjacent to the lake is a community centre, playground, ice rink, and a summer farmers' market. It is located at East 15th Avenue and Victoria Drive in East Vancouver's John Hendry Park.

The Hastings Mill, on the south side of the Inlet and running more than 20 hours a day, needed a lot of water, so built a flume, which occasionally collapsed, to carry it from Trout Lake. (Residents along that flume line frequently tapped it, with the mill's permission, for their own needs.) The mill had to post a man full-time at the lake to stop the beavers there from building dams that blocked the flow. Another of his chores was to remove the lake's trout from the flume, which at times was almost choked with fish.

== False Creek ==
False Creek is an inlet to the east of English Bay between Downtown and Fairview slopes.

== Boundary waters ==
- Fraser River
- English Bay
- Strait of Georgia
- Burrard Inlet
