= List of mayors of New Westminster =

Mayor of New Westminster
- Incumbent; Daniel Fontaine since November 2, 2026
- Style: His Worship; Mayor (informal)
- Member of: New Westminster City Council
- Reports to: New Westminster City Council
- Seat: New Westminster City Hall
- Term length: Four years, renewable
- Constituting instrument: Municipal Council Act, 1860; Municipal Act, 1872
- Inaugural holder: Leonard McClure (president); James Cunningham (mayor)
- Formation: President: 1860; 166 years ago Mayor: 1873; 153 years ago
- Website: www.newwestcity.ca/city_hall/mayor_and_council/mayor.php

The mayor of New Westminster, British Columbia, is the head of the municipal government of New Westminster, and acts as the presiding officer of New Westminster City Council. They are elected alongside the rest of city council every four years during the British Columbia municipal elections, although there are no limits to how many terms a mayor may serve. Prior to 1873, the head of the local government was titled the president of New Westminster, and was appointed by members of the municipal council, rather than being directly elected by New Westminster's residents. The current mayor of New Westminster is Daniel Fontaine, who is the 39th mayor of the city. Mayor Fontaine is also the second mayor who was elected as a member of an official municipal political party.

== List ==
Appointed by City Council (president)
#	Mayor	Term start	Term end	Party
1	Leonard McClure	1860	1861	Independent
2	John Ramage	1861	1862	Independent
3	Henry Holbrook	1862	1863	Independent
4	Robert Dickinson	1863	1864	Independent
5	William Clarkson	1864	1865	Independent
6	William J. Armstrong	1865	1866	Independent
7	John Robson	1866	1867	Independent
(3)	Henry Holbrook	1867	1869	Independent
(6)	William J. Armstrong	1869	1871	Independent
(5)	William Clarkson	1871	1872	Independent

Elected directly by the public (mayor)
#	Mayor	Term start	Term end	Party
8	James Cunningham	1873	1873	Independent (Note: Also a member of the Liberal Party of Canada.)
(4)	Robert Dickinson	1874	1875	Independent
9	Thomas R. McInnes	1876	1877	Independent (Note: Also a member of the Conservative Party of Canada.)
(3)	Henry Holbrook	1878	1878	Independent
10	W.D. Ferris	1979	1979	Independent
(4)	Robert Dickinson	1880	1881	Independent
11	Loftus R. McInnes	1882	1882	Independent
12	Henry Edmonds	1883	1883	Independent
(4)	Robert Dickinson	1883	1888	Independent
13	John Hendry	1889	1889	Independent
14	W.B. Townsend	1889	1889	Independent
15	John Brown	1890	1891	Independent
(14)	W.B. Townsend	1892	1892	Independent
16	D.S. Curtis	1893	1893	Independent
17	Henry Hoy (Note: Not to be confused with the English locomotive engineer Henry Hoy.)	1894	1894	Independent
18	B.W. Shiles	1895	1897	Independent
19	Thomas Ovens	1898	1899	Independent
20	J.T. Scott	1900	1901	Independent
21	W.H. Keary	1902	1909	Independent
22	John A. Lee	1910	1912	Independent
23	Arthur "Wells" Gray	1913	1919	Independent (Note: Also a member of the BC Liberals.)
24	J. J. Johnston (Note: Not to be confused with American actor J. J. Johnston.)	1920	1922	Independent
25	T.S. Annandale	1923	1926	Independent
(23)	Arthur "Wells" Gray	1927	1933 (Note: Conflicting reports suggest Wells Gray left office in 1930.)	Independent
26	Fred J. Hume	1934	1942	Independent (Note: Also a member of Vancouver's Non-Partisan Association.)
27	William Mott	1943	1948	Independent
28	J.L. Sangster	1949	1950	Independent
29	F. H. Jackson	1951	1958	Independent
30	Beth Wood (Note: Not to be confused with American politician Beth Wood.)	1959	1964	Independent
31	Stuart Gifford	1964	1968	Independent
32	Muni Evers	1968 (Note: Conflicting reports suggest Muni Evers served as mayor between 1969 and 1984.)	1982	Independent
33	Tom Baker (Note: Not to be confused with English actor and writer Tom Baker.)	1982	1988	Independent
34	Betty Toporowski	1988	1996	Independent
35	Helen Sparkes	1996	2002	Independent
36	Wayne Wright	2002	2014	Independent
37	Jonathan X. Côte	2014	2022	Independent
38	Patrick Johnstone	2022	2026	Community First New West
39	Daniel Fontaine	2026	ongoing	New West Progressives

== Mayors who held higher offices ==
=== Federal government ===
Senators

- Thomas Robert McInnes, 1881–1897

Members of Parliament

- James Cunningham, 1874–1878
- Thomas Robert McInnes, 1878–1881
- William Mott, 1949–1953

=== Provincial government ===
Lieutenant governors of British Columbia

- Thomas Robert McInnes, 1897–1900

Premiers of British Columbia

- John Robson, 1889–1892 (died in office)

MLAs of British Columbia / MLCs of British Columbia / MCAs of British Columbia

- Henry Holbrook, 1871–1875
- John Robson, 1871–1875 and 1882–1892
- William James Armstrong, 1871–1878 and 1881–1884
- Robert Dickinson, 1875–1878
- John Cunningham Brown, 1890–1894 and 1900–1901
- Arthur (Wells) Gray, 1927–1944 (died in office)
