= Thomas Robert McInnes =

Canadian politician (1840–1904)

The Honourable Thomas Robert McInnes
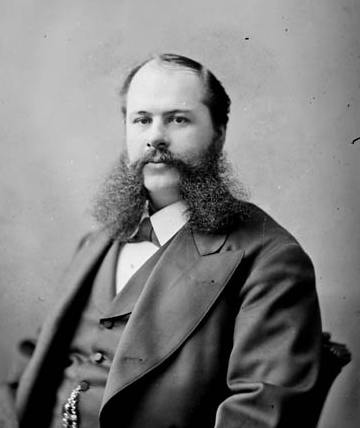

6th Lieutenant Governor of British Columbia
- In office 18 November 1897 – 21 June 1900
- Monarch: Victoria
- Governors General: The Earl of Aberdeen; The Earl of Minto
- Premier: John Herbert Turner; Charles Augustus Semlin; Joseph Martin; James Dunsmuir
- Preceded by: Edgar Dewdney
- Succeeded by: Henri-Gustave Joly de Lotbinière

Canadian Senator from British Columbia
- In office 24 December 1881 – 18 November 1897
- Nominated by: John A. Macdonald
- Appointed by: Marquess of Lorne

Member of Parliament for New Westminster
- In office 17 September 1878 – 24 December 1881
- Preceded by: James Cunningham
- Succeeded by: Joshua Homer

9th Mayor of New Westminster
- In office 1876–1877
- Preceded by: Robert Dickinson
- Succeeded by: Henry Holbrook

Personal details
- Born: 5 November 1840 Lake Ainslie, Nova Scotia, Canada
- Died: 15 March 1904 (aged 63) Vancouver, British Columbia, Canada
- Party: Independent
- Spouse: Martha Ellenor (m. 1865)
- Children: Thomas and William
- Education: Harvard University
- Occupation: Physician
- Profession: Politician

Thomas Robert McInnes or (Gaelic) Tòmas Raibeart Mac Aonghais (5 November 1840 – 15 March 1904) was a Canadian physician, Member of Parliament, Senator, and the sixth Lieutenant Governor of British Columbia.

He was the father of the poet Tom MacInnes.

== Background ==
McInnes was born in Lake Ainslie, Nova Scotia, to Scottish immigrant parents. He studied in the US, at Harvard University and elsewhere, earning a medical degree from Rush Medical College. McInnes served as a surgeon in the Confederate States Army during the American Civil War before returning to Canada. He initially settled in Dresden, Ontario, but relocated to New Westminster, British Columbia, in 1874. McInnes established himself as a physician and surgeon, attached to the Royal Columbian Hospital and also served as a coroner. In July, 1878 he was appointed as superintendent of the provincial Lunatic Asylum.

=== Political career ===
McInnes became mayor of New Westminster in 1877. He was acclaimed as an independent candidate in a federal by-election, 25 March 1878. His victory was confirmed in the general election which followed later in the year. McInnes resigned his Commons seat 12 December 1881 and was appointed to the Senate by Prime Minister Macdonald twelve days later. He resigned his Senate seat in 1897 upon his appointment as Lieutenant Governor of British Columbia.

=== Lieutenant Governor and aftermath ===
McInnes' term as Lieutenant Governor was often stormy as he twice dismissed Premiers and appointed successors who were controversial. A party system was only emerging in the province at the time and it was often unclear which members commanded support. Following the 1898 provincial election, incumbent Premier John Herbert Turner refused to resign, despite having only minority support. McInnes asked former Premier Robert Beaven to form a government, despite not having a seat in the legislature. There were rumours at the time that McInnes had asked Beaven that his son, William Wallace Burns McInnes, a federal Member of Parliament, be included in his cabinet. Beaven was unable to secure support for a government; four days later McInnes asked incumbent Opposition Leader Charles Augustus Semlin to form a government. Premier Semlin lost a no-confidence motion by one vote in 1900. McInnes then asked Attorney-General Joseph Martin to form a government, despite little support in the legislature, which fell on another no-confidence motion, 30-1. McInnes made another controversial choice, asking James Dunsmuir the heir of a powerful business family, to become Premier. Prime Minister Wilfrid Laurier had finally become exhausted with McInnes and requested the Governor-General (The Earl of Minto) replace him with Henri-Gustave Joly de Lotbinière, a cabinet minister from Quebec. McInnes thus became the only Lieutenant Governor of British Columbia dismissed from the office.

McInnes is also remembered for an 1890 senate bill entitled "An Act to Provide for the Use of Gaelic in Official Proceedings" which would have made Gaelic an official language in Canada. However, the bill was defeated 42–7. He also advocated the creation of a Canadian mint. At the time, Canadian currency was produced in Great Britain. McInnes attempted a political comeback in a 1903 federal by-election but finished last of the three candidates in the Burrard riding.
