= List of lieutenant governors of British Columbia =

The following is a list of the lieutenant governors of British Columbia. Though the present day office of the lieutenant governor in British Columbia came into being only upon the province's entry into Canadian Confederation in 1871, the post is a continuation from the first governorship of Vancouver Island in 1849, although without the same executive powers as governors had. There were also colonial lieutenant-governors whose job was that of deputy to the governor.

== Lieutenant governors of British Columbia, 1871–present ==
No.	Portrait	Name (Birth–Death)	Term of office		Monarch Reign	Premier Term of office
No.	Portrait	Name (Birth–Death)	Took office	Left office	Monarch Reign	Premier Term of office
1		Sir Joseph Trutch (1826–1904)	5 July 1871	27 June 1876	Victoria (1837–1901)	John Foster McCreight (1871–1872)
1		Sir Joseph Trutch (1826–1904)	5 July 1871	27 June 1876	Victoria (1837–1901)	Amor De Cosmos (1872–1874)
1		Sir Joseph Trutch (1826–1904)	5 July 1871	27 June 1876	Victoria (1837–1901)	George Anthony Walkem (1874–1876)
1		Sir Joseph Trutch (1826–1904)	5 July 1871	27 June 1876	Victoria (1837–1901)	Andrew Charles Elliott (1876–1878)
2		Albert Norton Richards (1821–1897)	27 June 1876	21 June 1881	Victoria (1837–1901)	Andrew Charles Elliott (1876–1878)
2		Albert Norton Richards (1821–1897)	27 June 1876	21 June 1881	Victoria (1837–1901)	George Anthony Walkem (1878–1882)
3		Clement Francis Cornwall (1836–1910)	21 June 1881	8 February 1887	Victoria (1837–1901)	George Anthony Walkem (1878–1882)
3		Clement Francis Cornwall (1836–1910)	21 June 1881	8 February 1887	Victoria (1837–1901)	Robert Beaven (1882–1883)
3		Clement Francis Cornwall (1836–1910)	21 June 1881	8 February 1887	Victoria (1837–1901)	William Smithe (1883–1887)
4		Hugh Nelson (1830–1893)	8 February 1887	1 November 1892	Victoria (1837–1901)	William Smithe (1883–1887)
4		Hugh Nelson (1830–1893)	8 February 1887	1 November 1892	Victoria (1837–1901)	Alexander Edmund Batson Davie (1887–1889)
4		Hugh Nelson (1830–1893)	8 February 1887	1 November 1892	Victoria (1837–1901)	John Robson (1889–1892)
4		Hugh Nelson (1830–1893)	8 February 1887	1 November 1892	Victoria (1837–1901)	Theodore Davie (1892–1895)
5		Edgar Dewdney (1835–1916)	1 November 1892	18 November 1897	Victoria (1837–1901)	Theodore Davie (1892–1895)
5		Edgar Dewdney (1835–1916)	1 November 1892	18 November 1897	Victoria (1837–1901)	John Herbert Turner (1895–1898)
6		Thomas Robert McInnes (1840–1904)	18 November 1897	21 June 1900	Victoria (1837–1901)	John Herbert Turner (1895–1898)
6		Thomas Robert McInnes (1840–1904)	18 November 1897	21 June 1900	Victoria (1837–1901)	Charles Augustus Semlin (1898–1900)
6		Thomas Robert McInnes (1840–1904)	18 November 1897	21 June 1900	Victoria (1837–1901)	Joseph Martin (1900)
6		Thomas Robert McInnes (1840–1904)	18 November 1897	21 June 1900	Victoria (1837–1901)	James Dunsmuir (1900–1902)
7		Sir Henri-Gustave Joly de Lotbinière (1829–1908)	21 June 1900	11 May 1906	Victoria (1837–1901)	James Dunsmuir (1900–1902)
7		Sir Henri-Gustave Joly de Lotbinière (1829–1908)	21 June 1900	11 May 1906	Edward VII (1901–1910)	James Dunsmuir (1900–1902)
7		Sir Henri-Gustave Joly de Lotbinière (1829–1908)	21 June 1900	11 May 1906	Edward VII (1901–1910)	Edward Gawler Prior (1902–1903)
7		Sir Henri-Gustave Joly de Lotbinière (1829–1908)	21 June 1900	11 May 1906	Edward VII (1901–1910)	Richard McBride (1903–1915)
8		James Dunsmuir (1851–1920)	11 May 1906	3 December 1909	Edward VII (1901–1910)	Richard McBride (1903–1915)
9		Thomas Wilson Paterson (1850–1921)	3 December 1909	5 December 1914	Edward VII (1901–1910)	Richard McBride (1903–1915)
9		Thomas Wilson Paterson (1850–1921)	3 December 1909	5 December 1914	George V (1910–1936)	Richard McBride (1903–1915)
10		Sir Francis Stillman Barnard (1856–1934)	5 December 1914	9 December 1919	George V (1910–1936)	Richard McBride (1903–1915)
10		Sir Francis Stillman Barnard (1856–1934)	5 December 1914	9 December 1919	George V (1910–1936)	William John Bowser (1915–1916)
10		Sir Francis Stillman Barnard (1856–1934)	5 December 1914	9 December 1919	George V (1910–1936)	Harlan Carey Brewster (1916–1918)
10		Sir Francis Stillman Barnard (1856–1934)	5 December 1914	9 December 1919	George V (1910–1936)	John Oliver (1918–1927)
11		Edward Gawler Prior (1853–1920)	9 December 1919	12 December 1920	George V (1910–1936)	John Oliver (1918–1927)
–		James Alexander MacDonald (1858–1939); Administrator of the Government	12 December 1920	24 December 1920	George V (1910–1936)	John Oliver (1918–1927)
12		Walter Cameron Nichol (1866–1928)	24 December 1920	21 January 1926	George V (1910–1936)	John Oliver (1918–1927)
13		Robert Randolph Bruce (1861–1942)	21 January 1926	18 July 1931	George V (1910–1936)	John Oliver (1918–1927)
13		Robert Randolph Bruce (1861–1942)	21 January 1926	18 July 1931	George V (1910–1936)	John Duncan MacLean (1927–1928)
13		Robert Randolph Bruce (1861–1942)	21 January 1926	18 July 1931	George V (1910–1936)	Simon Fraser Tolmie (1928–1933)
14		John William Fordham Johnson (1866–1938)	18 July 1931	1 May 1936	George V (1910–1936)	Simon Fraser Tolmie (1928–1933)
14		John William Fordham Johnson (1866–1938)	18 July 1931	1 May 1936	George V (1910–1936)	Duff Pattullo (1933–1941)
14		John William Fordham Johnson (1866–1938)	18 July 1931	1 May 1936	Edward VIII (1936)	Duff Pattullo (1933–1941)
15		Eric Hamber (1879–1960)	1 May 1936	29 August 1941	Edward VIII (1936)	Duff Pattullo (1933–1941)
15		Eric Hamber (1879–1960)	1 May 1936	29 August 1941	George VI (1936–1952)	Duff Pattullo (1933–1941)
16		William Culham Woodward (1885–1957)	29 August 1941	1 October 1946	George VI (1936–1952)	Duff Pattullo (1933–1941)
16		William Culham Woodward (1885–1957)	29 August 1941	1 October 1946	George VI (1936–1952)	John Hart (1941–1947)
17		Charles Arthur Banks (1885–1961)	1 October 1946	1 October 1950	George VI (1936–1952)	John Hart (1941–1947)
17		Charles Arthur Banks (1885–1961)	1 October 1946	1 October 1950	George VI (1936–1952)	Boss Johnson (1947–1952)
18		Clarence Wallace (1893–1982)	1 October 1950	3 October 1955	George VI (1936–1952)	Boss Johnson (1947–1952)
18		Clarence Wallace (1893–1982)	1 October 1950	3 October 1955	Elizabeth II (1952–2022)	Boss Johnson (1947–1952)
18		Clarence Wallace (1893–1982)	1 October 1950	3 October 1955	Elizabeth II (1952–2022)	W. A. C. Bennett (1952–1972)
19		Frank Mackenzie Ross (1891–1971)	3 October 1955	12 October 1960	Elizabeth II (1952–2022)	W. A. C. Bennett (1952–1972)
20		George Pearkes (1888–1984)	12 October 1960	2 July 1968	Elizabeth II (1952–2022)	W. A. C. Bennett (1952–1972)
21		John Robert Nicholson (1901–1983)	2 July 1968	13 February 1973	Elizabeth II (1952–2022)	W. A. C. Bennett (1952–1972)
21		John Robert Nicholson (1901–1983)	2 July 1968	13 February 1973	Elizabeth II (1952–2022)	Dave Barrett (1972–1975)
22		Walter Stewart Owen (1904–1981)	13 February 1973	18 May 1978	Elizabeth II (1952–2022)	Dave Barrett (1972–1975)
22		Walter Stewart Owen (1904–1981)	13 February 1973	18 May 1978	Elizabeth II (1952–2022)	Bill Bennett (1975–1986)
23		Henry Pybus Bell-Irving (1913–2002)	18 May 1978	15 July 1983	Elizabeth II (1952–2022)	Bill Bennett (1975–1986)
24		Robert Gordon Rogers (1919–2010)	15 July 1983	9 September 1988	Elizabeth II (1952–2022)	Bill Bennett (1975–1986)
24		Robert Gordon Rogers (1919–2010)	15 July 1983	9 September 1988	Elizabeth II (1952–2022)	Bill Vander Zalm (1986–1991)
25		David Lam (1923–2010)	9 September 1988	21 April 1995	Elizabeth II (1952–2022)	Bill Vander Zalm (1986–1991)
25		David Lam (1923–2010)	9 September 1988	21 April 1995	Elizabeth II (1952–2022)	Rita Johnston (1991)
25		David Lam (1923–2010)	9 September 1988	21 April 1995	Elizabeth II (1952–2022)	Mike Harcourt (1991–1996)
26		Garde Gardom (1924–2013)	21 April 1995	25 September 2001	Elizabeth II (1952–2022)	Mike Harcourt (1991–1996)
26		Garde Gardom (1924–2013)	21 April 1995	25 September 2001	Elizabeth II (1952–2022)	Glen Clark (1996–1999)
26		Garde Gardom (1924–2013)	21 April 1995	25 September 2001	Elizabeth II (1952–2022)	Dan Miller (1999–2000)
26		Garde Gardom (1924–2013)	21 April 1995	25 September 2001	Elizabeth II (1952–2022)	Ujjal Dosanjh (2000–2001)
26		Garde Gardom (1924–2013)	21 April 1995	25 September 2001	Elizabeth II (1952–2022)	Gordon Campbell (2001–2011)
27		Iona Campagnolo (1932–2024)	25 September 2001	30 September 2007	Elizabeth II (1952–2022)	Gordon Campbell (2001–2011)
28		Steven Point (born 1951)	30 September 2007	2 November 2012	Elizabeth II (1952–2022)	Gordon Campbell (2001–2011)
28		Steven Point (born 1951)	30 September 2007	2 November 2012	Elizabeth II (1952–2022)	Christy Clark (2011–2017)
29		Judith Guichon (born 1947)	2 November 2012	24 April 2018	Elizabeth II (1952–2022)	Christy Clark (2011–2017)
29		Judith Guichon (born 1947)	2 November 2012	24 April 2018	Elizabeth II (1952–2022)	John Horgan (2017–2022)
30		Janet Austin (born 1956 or 1957)	24 April 2018	30 January 2025	Elizabeth II (1952–2022)	John Horgan (2017–2022)
30		Janet Austin (born 1956 or 1957)	24 April 2018	30 January 2025	Charles III (since 2022)	David Eby (since 2022)
31		Wendy Lisogar-Cocchia (born 19–)	30 January 2025	Incumbent	Charles III (since 2022)	David Eby (since 2022)

== See also ==
- Office-holders of Canada
- List of Canadian incumbents by year
