= Tom MacInnes =

Canadian poet and writer

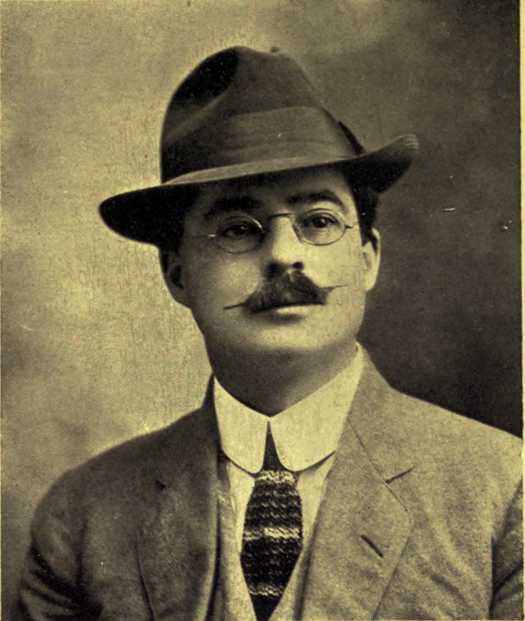
- Born: Thomas Robert Edward McInnes; October 29, 1867; Dresden, Ontario, Canada
- Died: February 11, 1951 (aged 83); Vancouver, British Columbia, Canada
- Education: University of Toronto, Osgoode Hall Law School
- Occupation: lawyer
- Relatives: Thomas Robert McInnes (father); William Wallace Burns McInnes (brother)
- Writing career
- Language: English
- Genre: poetry

Thomas Robert Edward MacInnes (né McInnes) (October 29, 1867 – February 11, 1951) was a Canadian poet and writer whose writings ranged from "vigorous, slangy recollections of the Yukon gold rush" (Lonesome Bar, 1909) to "a translation of and commentary on Lao-tzu’s philosophy" (The Teaching of the Old Boy, 1927). His narrative verse was highly popular in his lifetime.

== Life ==
He was born Thomas Robert Edward McInnes in Dresden, Ontario. He moved to New Westminster with his family in 1874, and grew up there. His father, Thomas Robert McInnes, served in the Senate of Canada from 1881 to 1897, and as Lieutenant-Governor of British Columbia from 1897 until 1900.

MacInnes was educated at University College, Toronto, graduating with a B.A. from the University of Toronto in 1887. He studied law at Osgoode Hall Law School in Toronto, Ontario, and was called to the bar in 1893.

McInnes served as secretary to the Bering Sea Claims Commission in 1896 and 1897, and for part of 1897 was a member of the Yukon special police and customs force at Skagway. He acted as private secretary to his father, the Lieutenant-Governor of British Columbia, from 1898 until 1900 (when the elder McInnes was dismissed from the office).

He was still spelling his surname "McInnes" as of 1916.

MacInnes spent long periods in China, where he had business interests, between 1916 and 1927.

MacInnes wrote a series of articles on his Chinese experiences, published in 1926 in the Vancouver Morning Star and Vancouver Province, that became the basis of his 1927 book, Oriental Occupation of British Columbia. According to more than one sources, the book proposes that British Columbia adopt apartheid-like policies in dealing with what MacInnes perceived to be an undesirable influx of Chinese immigrants. Another source, though, calls Oriental Occupation... "a pamphlet," says that MacInnes had "developed a sympathy for Orientals living in British Columbia," and says that the pamphlet reflects his "views of British Columbia prejudice" against Orientals.

In Vancouver, MacInnes joined the Canadian Union of Fascists. He became a leading activist in the fascist scene, founding the Nationalist League of Canada.

== Writing ==
MacInnes's poetry was popular in Canada in the first half of the 20th century. He wrote "light, easy verse that dismissed smugness and respectability with unconcerned humour ... an amused detachment underlies his work, as though poetry were merely one form of expression, as good as any other." He believed "that joy and delight, rather than the prevalent melancholic outpourings of the soul, were essential to poetry."

MacInnes can be compared to Robert Service, not least in the fact of their popularity in Canada at the time. Like Service in his Yukon and war poems, MacInnes, "was especially interested in examining man within a natural landscape, on the fringes of society." Also like Service, "his rhythms are often forced and pedantic, his rhyme-schemes careless and rough."

In some ways MacInnes seems to have modeled his career on that of Service. His first published work, A Romance of the Lost (1908), is a long yarn in rhyme about the Klondike Gold Rush, in the manner of the poems in Service's 1907 breakthrough work, Songs of a Sourdough. In 1913 MacInnes released Rhymes of a Rounder, on the heels of Service's 1912 Rhymes of a Rolling Stone.

Unlike Service, though, MacInnes "was intrigued with elaborate poetic forms, such as the villanelle," and actually invented "a five-line stanza of his own he called the 'mirelle'."

Katherine Hale, reviewing Macinnes's first book in The Mail and Empire, pronounced that "the best poem is 'The Damozel of Doom,' an eerie, dreamlike, passionate piece, suggested by the teaching of old Tao, who believed that there are regions where dead souls may be awakened by desires so strong that they are drawn outward again to Earth, where, through finer desires, they again pass into Paradise. Then 'the peace of a thousand years may be theirs in Limbo'.... The coming of this desire, which shall ultimately free, or banish the soul to ages of 'utter vanishment' is depicted in 'The Damozel of Doom' – a poem worthy of the genius of Poe."

John Garvin included three MacInnes poems, including "The Damozel of Doom," in his 1916 anthology Canadian Poets, and wrote of MacInnes's poetry: "Originality, constructive imagination, felicitous fancy, and delightful humour (if sometimes grim), combined with philosophic subtlety, much experience of life, and skilled artistry, are the outstanding qualities of this poet, so little known to Canadian readers, so worthy of their appreciation."

In a 1933 talk, on Canadian poets who had become known in the early 20th century, Charles G.D. Roberts said: "Preeminent among these is Tom MacInnes, standing somewhat apart from the stream of our poetry, and tracing the inheritance of his very individual talent to François Villon and Edgar Allan Poe, with an occasional dash of Keats."

== Publications ==
=== Poetry collections ===
- A Romance of the Lost. Montreal: Desbarats & Co., 1908.
- Lonesome Bar: A Romance of the Lost, and Other Poems. Montreal: Desbarats & Co., 1909.
- In Amber Lands - 1910.
- Rhymes of a Rounder. North Vancouver, BC: Review P, 1912. New York: Broadway, Publishing, 1913.
- The Fool of Joy. Toronto: McClelland, Goodchild & Stewart, 1918.
- Roundabout Rhymes Charles G.D. Roberts fwd. - 1923.
- The Complete Poems of Tom MacInnes. Toronto: Ryerson P, 1923.
- High Low Along: A Didactic Poem - 1934.
- In the Old of My Age - 1947.

=== Books: prose ===
- Chinook Days - 1926.
- Oriental Occupation of British Columbia. Vancouver: Sun Publishing, 1927.
- The Teaching of the Old Boy. London, Toronto: J.M. Dent, 1927.

== Edited ==
- Christian Klengenberg, Klengenberg of the Arctic. London: Cape, 1932.
