= John Hendry Park =

Public park in Vancouver, British Columbia

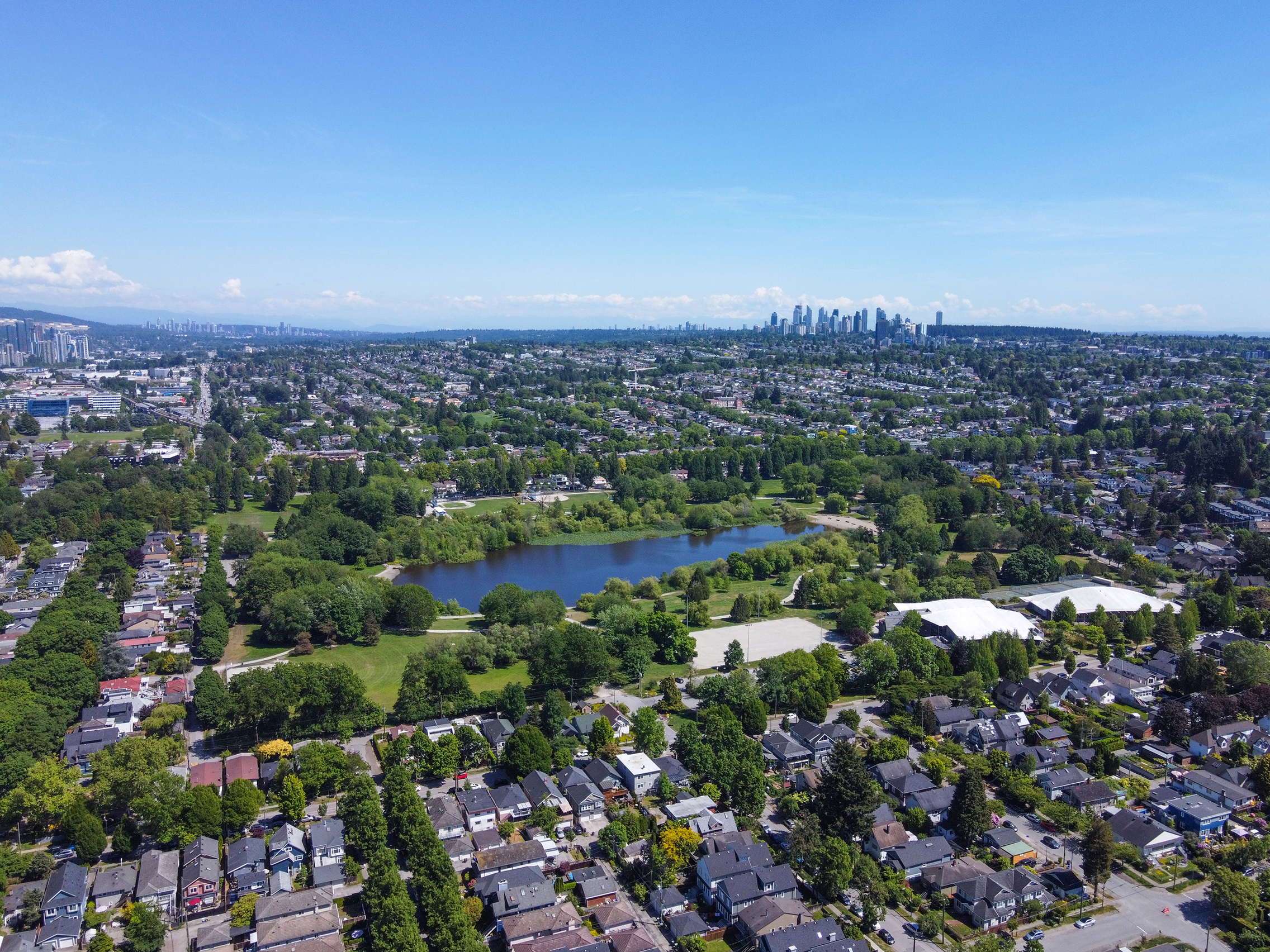
- Aerial view of John Hendry Park in 2026

- Location in Metro Vancouver
- Location: 2100 block East 19th Avenue; John Hendry Park, Vancouver, British Columbia, Canada
- Coordinates: 49°15′16″N 123°03′40″W
- Lake type: Freshwater lake
- Primary inflows: Creek filled in. Supply is from rain fall & city water.
- Primary outflows: City drainage. Creeks filled in.
- Catchment area: Grandview, Vancouver
- Basin countries: Canada
- Max. length: 0.4 kilometres (440 yd)
- Max. width: 0.2 kilometres (220 yd)
- Surface elevation: 37 metres (121 ft)
- Islands: none

John Hendry Park is 27-hectare park in the city of Vancouver, British Columbia, Canada. It's operated by the Vancouver Park Board and the Grandview Community Association. Locals often refer to the park informally as Trout Lake, due to the lake itself being its largest feature. It’s a focal point of the Cedar Cottage neighbourhood.

== History ==
The park was one of Vancouver's first lumbering operations in the late 19th century. The lake was the water source for the Hastings Sawmill, which was owned by industrialist John Hendry. In 1926, Hendry's daughter, who was married to then-Lieutenant Governor of BC Eric Hamber, donated the mill property to the Park Board with the condition that it be named after her father.

In 1963, the Grandview Community Centre, located near Victoria Drive, was constructed. The community centre was renovated in 1977 and renamed Trout Lake Community Centre.

In 2010, the new ice rink and renovations were completed for the 2010 Winter Olympics as the training venue for figure skating, with contributions of $13.15 million from the Park Board, $2.5 million from the Vancouver Organizing Committee for the 2010 Olympics (VANOC), and $250,000 from the Grandview Community Association. However, the real cost of the ice rink is estimated at $15.9 million.

== Sports ==
John Hendry Rugby Field, located in the northeastern corner of the park, is the home ground of Scribes Rugby Club. Trout Lake Little League use the baseball diamonds just south of the field.

Trout Lake Community Centre is the former home of the Burnaby Steelers, who moved to Britannia Community Centre in 2003. During their time in East Vancouver, they went under the name the Grandview Steelers.

== Facilities ==
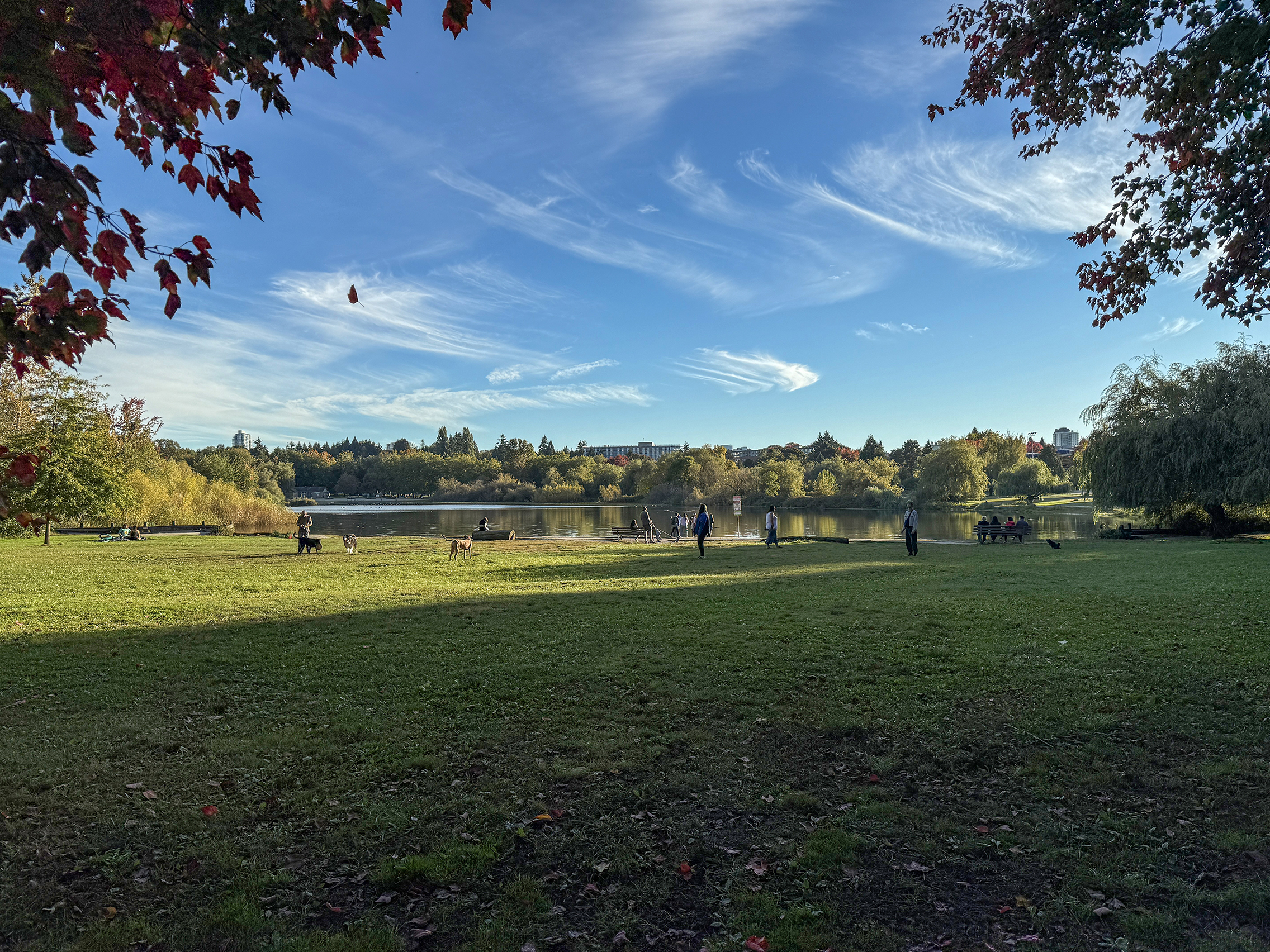
Trout Lake, north beach (dog's beach)

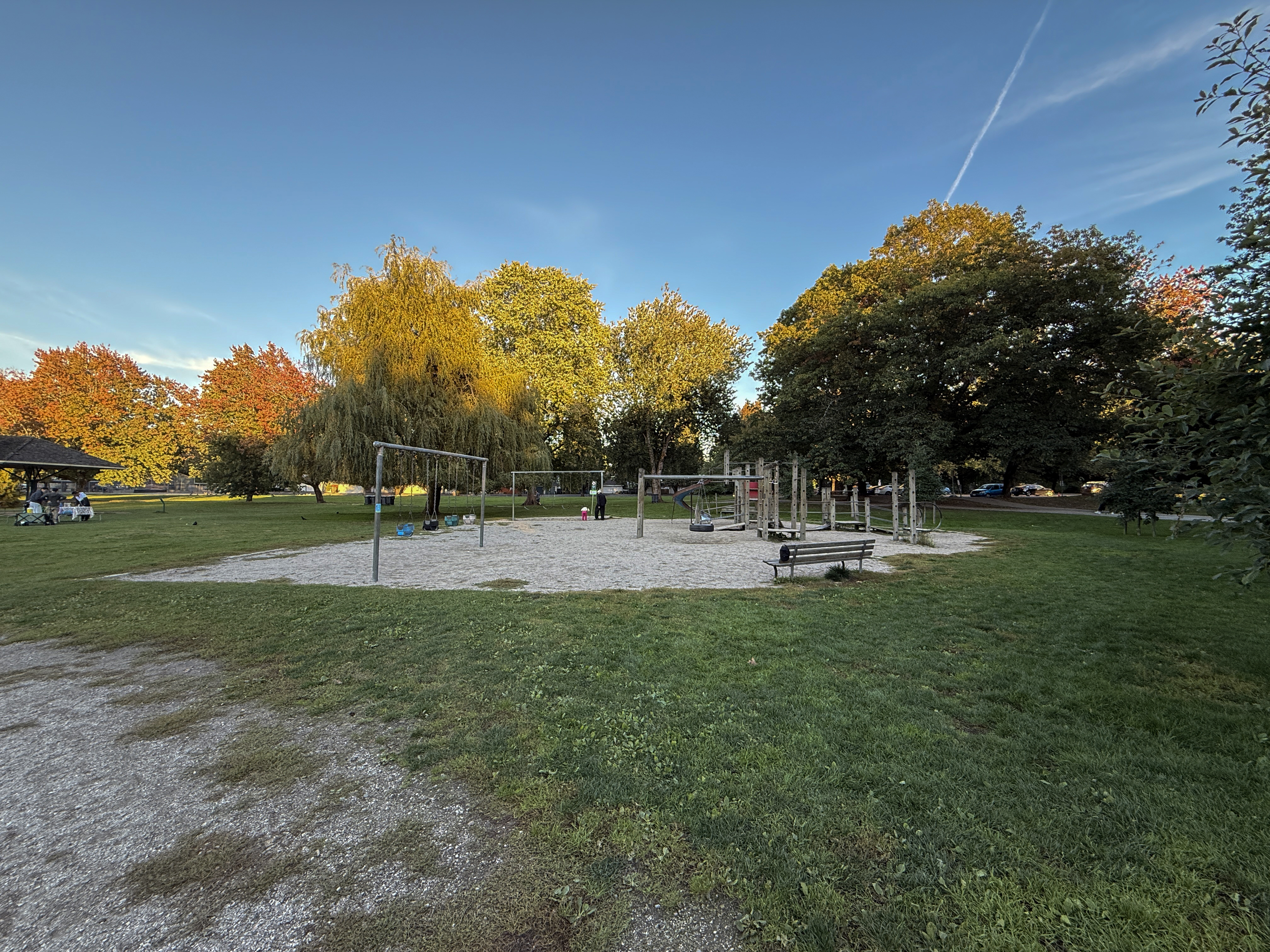
Children play area

Trout Lake
Located at 2100 block East 19th Avenue just off of Victoria Drive

- Lifeguards from May to September
- No boating allowed
- No swimming allowed
- 26,000-square-metre dog off-leash area (north end of lake)

John Hendry Park

- 1 grass & 1 gravel soccer field
- 5 baseball diamonds
- 2 concession stands
- 2 washrooms
- Picnic area
- BBQs are permitted
- Free parking
- Biking trails
- Walking & jogging trails
- 2 playgrounds
- Basketball courts
- Tennis courts
- Indigenous Medicine Garden

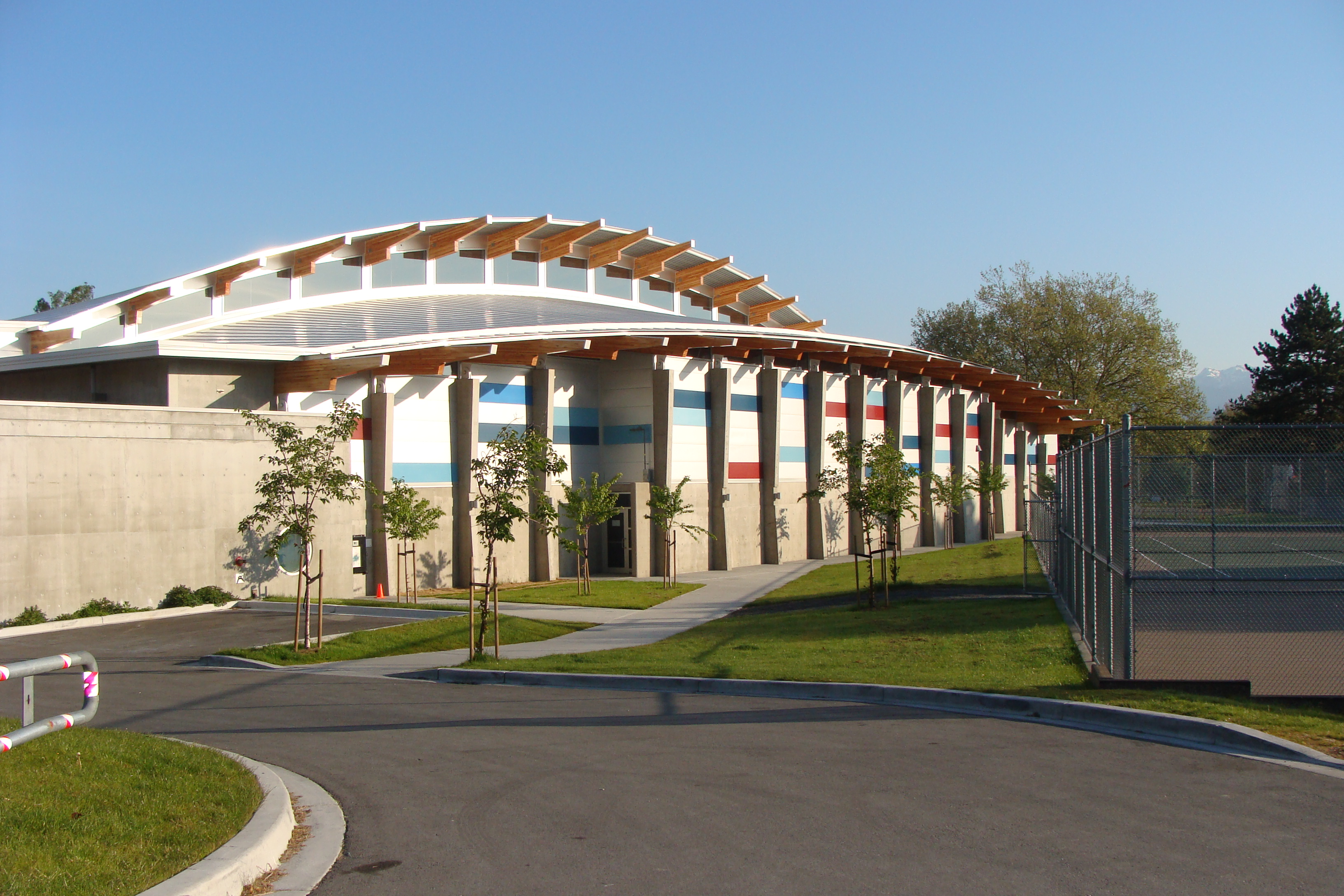
Trout Lake ice rink & tennis courts

Trout Lake Community Centre
Located at 3300 Victoria Drive and E 15th Avenue

- Ice rink
- Gym facilities
- Game room
- Weight room
- Sauna
- Classrooms
- Hall

== Activities ==
- First Nations pow-wow
- Trout Lake Farmers Market (hosted in the community centre's parking lot)
- Parade of Lost Souls (during Halloween season)
- Outdoor performances (at the beach during summer months)

== See also ==
- Bodies of water in Vancouver
- Hydrology map of Trout Lake
