= Colonial Assembly of British Columbia =

History
- Founded: 1858
- Disbanded: 1866
- Succeeded by: Legislative Council of British Columbia

The Colony Assembly of British Columbia was formed in 1858 but there was no assembly until 1864. The assembly existed from January 21, 1864, to August 6, 1866, when the Colony of British Columbia merged with the Colony of Vancouver Island. Only a minority of the members of the Legislative Council were elected.

== Governors of British Columbia ==
- Sir James Douglas, 1858–1864
- Frederick Seymour, 1864–1866

== Members of the Legislative Assembly ==
Members 1863–1864

Name	Position	Representation	First elected/appointed	Term number
Arthur N. Birch	Colonial Secretary and Presiding Member		1863	1
Henry Pering Pellew Crease	Attorney General		1863	1
Wymond Oglivy Hamley	Collector of Customs		1863	1
Chartes Brew	Magistrate	New Westminster	1863	1
Peter O'Reilly	Magistrate	Cariboo East	1863	1
E.H. Sanders	Magistrate	Yale	1863	1
Henry Maynard Ball	Magistrate	Lytton	1863	1
Peter Henry Nind	Magistrate	Douglas	1863	1
Joshua Homer	Member	New Westminster District	1863	1
Robert Thompson Smith	Member	Yale and Lytton District	1863	1
Henry Holbrook	Member	Douglas and Lillooet District	1863	1
James Orr	Member	Cariboo East District	1863	1
Walter Shaw Black	Member	Cariboo West District	1863	1

Members 1864–1865

Name	Position	Representation	First elected/appointed	Term number
Arthur N. Birch	Colonial Secretary and Presiding Member		1863	2
Henry Pering Pellew Crease	Attorney General		1863	2
William Franks	Treasurer		1864	1
Wymond Oglivy Hamley	Collector of Customs		1863	2
Chartes Brew	Magistrate	New Westminster	1863	2
Peter O'Reilly	Magistrate	Cariboo	1863	2
Henry Maynard Ball	Magistrate	Lytton	1863	2
Andrew Charles Elliott	Magistrate	Lillooet	1864	1
John Carmichael Haynes	Magistrate	Osoyoos and Kootenay	1864	1
Joshua Homer	Member	New Westminster District	1863	2
Clement Francis Cornwall	Member	Hope, Yale and Lytton District	1864	1
Henry Holbrook	Member	Douglas and Lillooet District	1863	2
George Anthony Walkem	Member	Cariboo East and Quesnel Forks District	1864	1
Walter Moberly	Member	Cariboo West and Quesnelmouth District	1864	1

Members 1866

Name	Position	Representation	First elected/appointed	Term number
Henry Maynard Ball	Acting Colonial Secretary and Presiding Member		1863	3
Henry Pering Pellew Crease	Attorney General		1863	3
Charles William Franks	Treasurer		1864	2
Joseph Trutch	Chief Commissioner of Lands and Works and Surveyor General		1866	1
Wymond Oglivy Hamley	Collector of Customs		1863	3
Chartes Brew	Magistrate	New Westminster	1863	3
Peter O'Reilly	Magistrate	Kootenay	1863	3
Andrew Charles Elliott	Magistrate	Lillooet	1864	2
John Carmichael Haynes	Magistrate	Osoyoos and Kootenay	1864	2
Joshua Homer	Member	New Westminster District	1863	3
Clement Francis Cornwall	Member	Hope, Yale and Lytton District	1864	2
Henry Holbrook	Member	Douglas and Lillooet District	1863	3
George Anthony Walkem	Member	Cariboo East and Quesnel Forks District	1864	2
Robert Smith	Member	Cariboo West and Quesnelmouth District	1866	1
