= John Hendry (industrialist) =

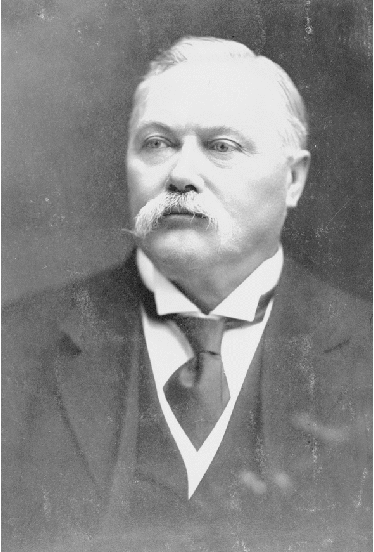

13th Mayor of New Westminster
- In office January 1889 – July 1889
- Preceded by: Robert Dickinson
- Succeeded by: W.B. Townsend

Personal details
- Born: January 20, 1843 Belledune, New Brunswick, Canada
- Died: July 17, 1916 (aged 73)
- Children: 1
- Occupation: Businesspeople Politician

John Hendry (January 20, 1843 – July 17, 1916) was a Canadian industrialist and politician who founded B. C. Mills, the first major lumber company in western Canada starting with his first mill in 1875. He is a person of National Historic Significance in Canada.

== Early life ==
Hendry was born in Belledune, New Brunswick to Scottish immigrants James and Margaret Hendry (née Wilson). John Hendry's father had immigrated to New Brunswick from West Kilbride, Scotland in 1840, settled in Gloucester County, and was engaged in the sawmill and flour milling businesses. John was educated in New Brunswick and he received formal and practical training with his father. In the 1860s, he and his elder brother started their own sawmill. When their father died John took over the family business temporarily. He then travelled in the “western States,” but in 1870 he returned to New Brunswick to establish a sawmill, which exported to the West Indies. He worked at the family mill before moving west permanently in 1872.

== Lumber dominance ==
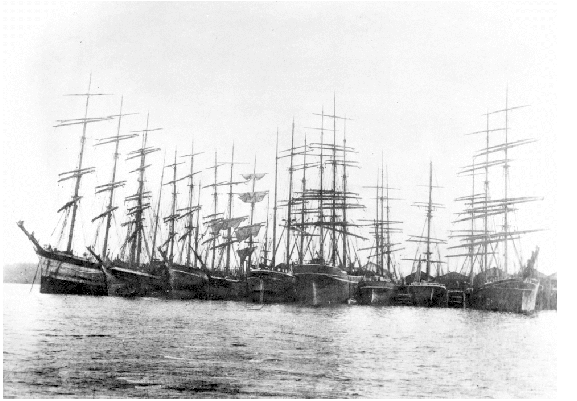
Ships loading at Hastings Mill in the 1800s.

In 1876, Hendry and David McNair established Nanaimo Planing Mills.

== Political foray ==
Hendry, was on New Westminster city council from 1879 to 1880 and elected mayor in January 1889. He resigned in July because of a conflict of interest with him being involved with the New Westminster Southern Railway Company.

== Legacy ==
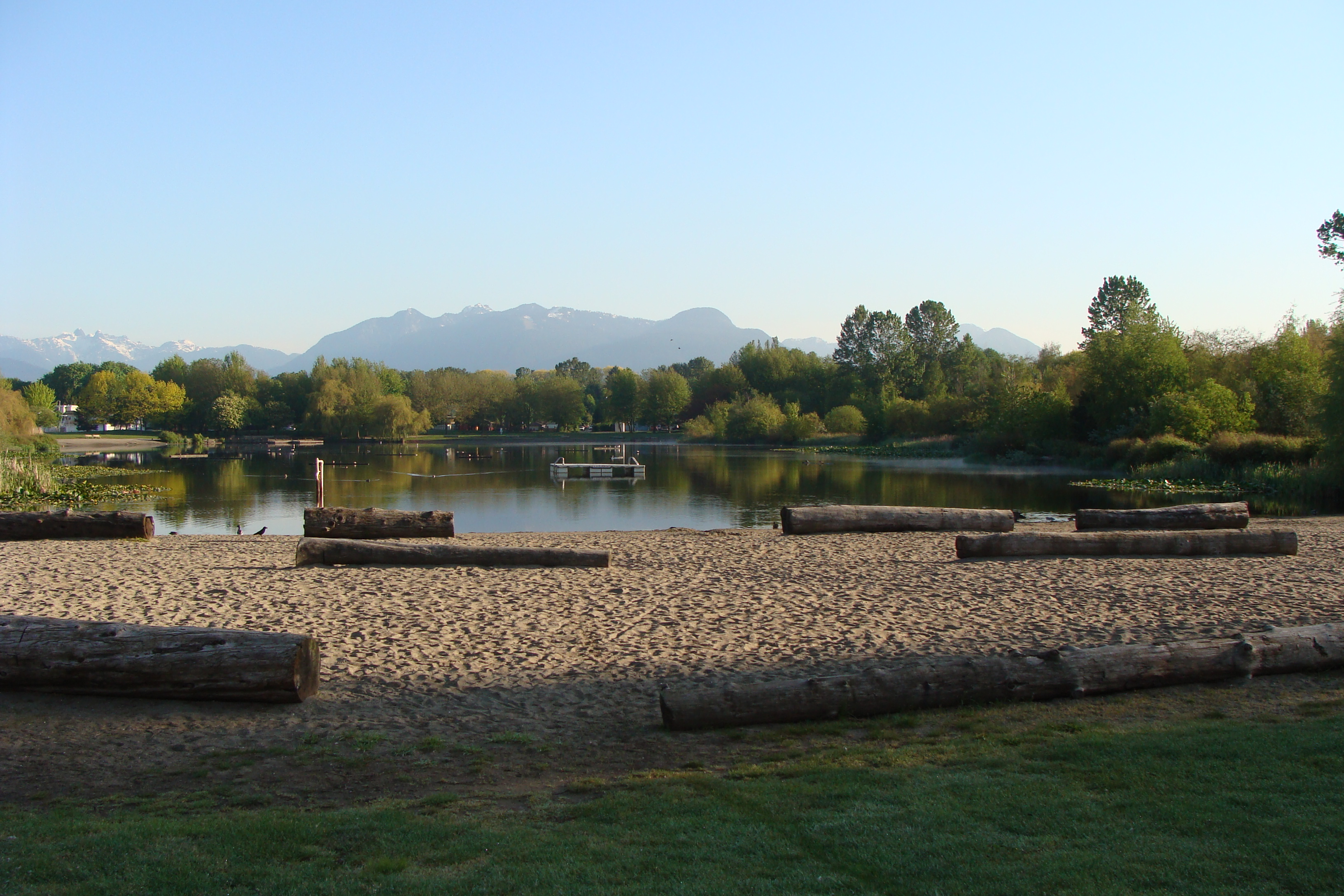
John Hendry Park is a 27.31-hectare park at 3300 Victoria Drive and 15th Avenue in Vancouver, British Columbia.

Hendry's introduction of steam donkeys and railways were the model for the lumber industry of the 20th century.

In 1926, Hendry's daughter Aldyen, who was married to the Lieutenant Governor of British Columbia, Eric Hamber, donated some mill property to the Vancouver Park Board with the condition that it be named after her father. It is still known as John Hendry Park.

== See also ==
- Hastings Mill
- Economic History of Vancouver
