= Eric Hamber =

Lieutenant Governor of British Columbia (1879–1960)

The Honourable Eric Hamber CMG
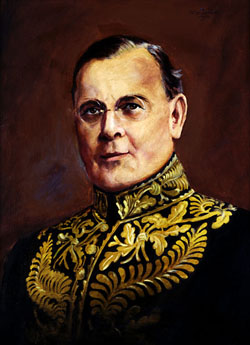

15th Lieutenant Governor of British Columbia
- In office May 1, 1936 – August 29, 1941
- Monarchs: Edward VIII; George VI
- Governors General: The Lord Tweedsmuir; The Earl of Athlone
- Premier: Duff Pattullo
- Preceded by: John William Fordham Johnson
- Succeeded by: William Culham Woodward

Personal details
- Born: April 21, 1879 Winnipeg, Manitoba, Canada
- Died: January 10, 1960 (aged 80) Vancouver, British Columbia, Canada
- Spouse: Aldyen Hendry (m. 1912)
- Relations: John Hendry (father-in-law)
- Occupation: Businessman
- Profession: Politician

Eric Werge Hamber CMG (April 21, 1879 – January 10, 1960) was a Canadian businessman and the 15th lieutenant governor of British Columbia.

== Early life ==
Born on April 21, 1879, in Winnipeg, Manitoba, as a youth he was an excellent athlete who shone in his school rowing, rugby, football, and hockey teams. His first job was as a junior clerk with the Dominion Bank, and he moved to Vancouver, British Columbia, to open a new branch in 1907. On May 14, 1912, he married Aldyen Hendry and began work at the BC Mills Timber and Trading Company, a company owned by Aldyen's father John Hendry. Hamber later became the company's president.

In 1934 he built the Tudor Revival style, Minnekhada Lodge, in Coquitlam as a country retreat and hunting lodge. The land is now managed by Metro Vancouver Parks.

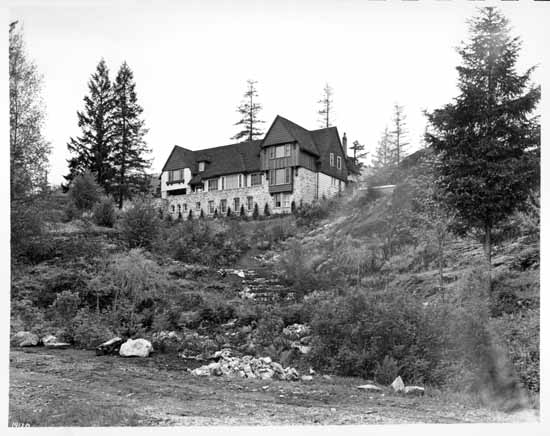
Minnekhada Ranch in Coquitlam, BC

== Public office ==
On May 1, 1936, he became Lieutenant Governor of British Columbia, achieving considerable popularity. He left office in 1941 and accepted the position of chancellor of the University of British Columbia in 1944, a position he held for seven years. In 1946, he was made a companion of the Order of St Michael and St George.

He died on January 10, 1960.

== Other information ==
Vancouver's Eric Hamber Secondary School is named after him, and Hamber House in UBC's Place Vanier residence is named after his wife, Aldyen. The Hamber Provincial Park on the BC side of the Canadian Rockies and Theatre BC's most prestigious award also bear his name.

When Queen Elizabeth II was married in 1947, Hamber and his wife were the only Canadian private guests.

Academic offices
Preceded by Robert E. McKechnie	Chancellor of the University of British Columbia; 1944–1951	Succeeded by Sherwood Lett
