= Robert Dickinson (British Columbia politician) =

Canadian politician

Robert Dickinson (1835 – November 1, 1889) was an English-born businessman and political figure in British Columbia. He represented New Westminster City in the Legislative Assembly of British Columbia from 1875 to 1878.

He was born in Liverpool and came to British Columbia in 1859 with his mother Eliza, his step-father Thomas Harris and his brothers Frank and Charles. Dickinson had been a timber merchant's apprentice in Liverpool. He worked in his step-father's butcher shops, eventually taking over the operation in New Westminster. He served as president of the municipal council for New Westminster from 1863 to 1865 and was mayor from 1874 to 1875, from 1880 to 1881 and from 1883 to 1888. Dickinson also served as president of the local Mechanics' Institute and of the Royal Columbian Hospital. He died in New Westminster at the age of 53.

Dickenson [sic] Street in New Westminster was named after him.
