= New Westminster (federal electoral district) =

Former federal electoral district in British Columbia, Canada

British Columbia electoral district
- Boundaries at abolition

Defunct federal electoral district
- Legislature: House of Commons
- District created: 1871
- District abolished: 1979
- First contested: 1872
- Last contested: 1974

New Westminster was a federal electoral district in the province of British Columbia, Canada, that was represented in the House of Commons of Canada from 1871 to 1979.

This riding was created in 1871 as New Westminster District when British Columbia joined Confederation and returned six members of parliament by special byelections in five electoral districts (with Victoria District returning two members). It was renamed New Westminster in 1872 when the word "district" was dropped from the name of all five electoral districts. The riding was abolished in 1976, when it was redistributed into the ridings of New Westminster—Coquitlam and Burnaby.

== History ==
From being geographically the largest electoral district of the province upon joining confederation to its elimination as a standalone seat just over a century later, the evolution of this namesake electoral district followed the gradual decline in importance of the Royal City, once the capital of the Colony of British Columbia.

=== Pre-confederation ===
Before confederation, the various colonies and dominions had different election laws that restricted enfranchisement on various factors such as gender, land ownership, religion, allegiance to the United Kingdom, or length of residency. New Brunswick only allowed white male to vote, and First Nations are routinely excluded as they were not consider British subjects.

The electoral district of New Westminster however had the uniquely odious honour of being the first to single out specific racial groups for exclusion. When the Colony of British Columbia held its first general election in 1866, Chinese and First Nations were excluded from voting only in the New Westminster district.

=== 1871 to 1896 ===
When British Columbia joined Confederation in 1871, the province's six seats were allocated three each to the island and the mainland. Of the three seats for the mainland, two seats were allocated for the interior districts Cariboo and Yale. Accordingly, this riding constituted the entire New Westminster Land District, which covered largely modern day understanding of the Greater Vancouver, and Coast land district, the vast and largely unsurveyed mainland area west of 124th meridian west and the adjoining islands. (At the time, the City of Vancouver did not exist and the Vancouver riding was for the area of Vancouver Island not in Victoria.) It was and remained geographically the largest electoral district in the province until 1896. It returned Hugh Nelson, later Lieutenant Governor, for its first two terms.

The six original districts were contested in six general elections from 1872 to 1891 and represented through to the seventh parliament until the 1896 election. Although the boundary between New Westminster and Coast land districts has shifted significantly north to around modern day Prince Rupert according to the official map issued in 1891 by Forbes George Vernon, the province's Chief Commissioner of Lands and Works, the riding remained notionally the same as it consisted of both those district.

During this period, the three mainland seats consistently returned Conservative MPs, with Liberal James Cunningham's election in 1874 being the exception. Cunningham did not complete his term however, having resigned after being elected as the first directly elected mayor of New Westminster.

=== 1896 to 1914 ===
Given the gradual growth of population and the incorporation of The City of Vancouver, the two interior seats were merged and a new seat named Burrard was created from New Westminster in the 1896 election, covering part of the newly incorporated City of Vancouver and the vast geography north of it. These new boundary also brought in a new batch of members, with all three mainland ridings returning Liberal MPs.

At the 1904 election, another riding was created from New Westminster with the City of Vancouver and its suburbs the municipalities of Point Grey and South Vancouver forming the electoral district of Vancouver City.

=== 1914 till 1979 ===
New Westminster riding continued to include Richmond, Delta and all the Fraser Valley communities up the river to one mile beyond Yale. In 1914, the riding consisted of New Westminster, Richmond and Delta, losing the Surrey-Langley area to the new Westminster District, which was only contested once before changing name to Fraser Valley.

In a further redistribution in 1924, the riding was shrunk to areas south of the Fraser River west of and including the Township of Langley, plus the city of New Westminster and the City of Burnaby. As population in the Lower Mainland continued to grow, by the 1933 election, the northern half of Burnaby was distributed to Vancouver North. By the 1947 election, the rest of Burnaby and Richmond were removed and became Burnaby-Richmond, and New Westminster riding consisted of New Westminster, Surrey, Delta and Langley.

The 1966 redistribution, which combined northern Burnaby into North Vancouver-Seymour, New Westminster riding extended as far into Burnaby as Grandview Highway and Edmonds Avenue, including Burnaby Mountain and the areas of Coquitlam west of Laurentian Avenue. At the time this included the then-municipality of Fraser Mills adjoining the francophone community at Maillardville. Langley, Surrey and Delta were excluded from the riding.

The riding was abolished in 1976. Successor ridings were Burnaby and New Westminster—Coquitlam.

=== Historical boundaries ===
1914 representation order

1933 representation order

1947 representation order

1952 representation order

1966 representation order

1976 representation order (as New Westminster—Coquitlam)

== Members of Parliament ==
While its provincial counterpart returned a premier, a deputy premier, and numerous consequential provincial ministers, including one who served both in federal cabinet while elected an MP elsewhere, not a single MP elected from this seat ever served in federal cabinet. It however returned a few infamous character:

- Thomas Robert McInnes, the only Lieutenant Governor of British Columbia ever dismissed from the office
- William Garland McQuarrie, a vocal early advocate of racist policies against Asians, long before such view became mainstream during the second world war
- Thomas Reid, a vocal advocate for the complete removal Canadians of Japanese ancestry, including those born in Canada
- George Hahn, after losing the New Westminster seat, sought and lost a byelection while seeking the Social Credit leadership in 1961, resulting in his last place finish in the leadership contest

Parliament	Years	Member	Party
Riding created from New Westminster District
2nd	1872–1874	Hugh Nelson	Liberal–Conservative
3rd	1874–1878	James Cunningham	Liberal
3rd	1878–1878	Thomas Robert McInnes	Independent
4th	1878–1882	Thomas Robert McInnes	Independent
4th	1882–1882	Joshua Homer	Liberal–Conservative
5th	1882–1887	Joshua Homer	Liberal–Conservative
6th	1887–1890†	Donald Chisholm	Conservative
6th	1890–1891	Gordon Edward Corbould	Conservative
7th	1891–1896	Gordon Edward Corbould	Conservative
8th	1896–1900	Aulay MacAulay Morrison	Liberal
9th	1900–1904	Aulay MacAulay Morrison	Liberal
10th	1904–1908	James Buckham Kennedy	Liberal
11th	1908–1911	James Davis Taylor	Conservative
12th	1911–1917	James Davis Taylor	Conservative
13th	1917–1921	William Garland McQuarrie	Government (Unionist)
14th	1921–1925	William Garland McQuarrie	Conservative
15th	1925–1930	William Garland McQuarrie	Conservative
16th	1930–1935	Thomas Reid	Liberal
17th	1935–1940	Thomas Reid	Liberal
18th	1940–1945	Thomas Reid	Liberal
19th	1945–1949	Thomas Reid	Liberal
20th	1949–1949	Thomas Reid	Liberal
20th	1949–1953	William Mott	Liberal
21st	1953–1957	George Hahn	Social Credit
22nd	1957–1958	George Hahn	Social Credit
23rd	1958–1962	William McLennan	Progressive Conservative
24th	1962–1963	Barry Mather	New Democratic
25th	1963–1965	Barry Mather	New Democratic
26th	1965–1968	Barry Mather	New Democratic
27th	1968–1972	Douglas Hogarth	Liberal
28th	1972–1974	Stuart Leggatt	New Democratic
29th	1974–1979	Stuart Leggatt	New Democratic
Riding dissolved into New Westminster—Coquitlam and Burnaby

== Electoral history ==
1974 Canadian federal election
Party	Candidate	Votes	%	±%
New Democratic	Stuart Leggatt	15,397	32.85	–8.74
Progressive Conservative	Marg Gregory	15,193	32.42	+0.45
Liberal	Carl Miller	14,997	32.00	+8.16
Social Credit	Ted Adlem	926	1.98	–0.13
Communist	Rod Doran	190	0.41	–0.01
Independent	Selmer E. Bean	96	0.20	–
Marxist–Leninist	Leanne Averbach	68	0.15	–
Total valid votes		46,867	99.72	
Total rejected ballots		133	0.28	–1.41
Turnout		47,000	70.20	–1.97
Eligible voters		66,956		
New Democratic hold		Swing		–4.60
Source: Library of Parliament

1972 Canadian federal election
Party	Candidate	Votes	%	±%
New Democratic	Stuart Leggatt	19,181	41.60	+1.85
Progressive Conservative	Maurice Mulligan	14,739	31.96	+20.24
Liberal	Greg Basham	10,992	23.84	–20.68
Social Credit	Ted Adlem	971	2.11	–1.30
No affiliation	Rod Doran	192	0.42	–
No affiliation	Victor Reid	36	0.08	–
Total valid votes		46,111	98.31	
Total rejected ballots		792	1.69	+1.13
Turnout		46,903	72.16	–6.08
Eligible voters		64,995		
New Democratic gain from Liberal		Swing		–9.19
Source: Library of Parliament

1968 Canadian federal election
Party	Candidate	Votes	%	±%
Liberal	Douglas Hogarth	18,083	44.52	+20.29
New Democratic	Clive B. Lytle	16,144	39.74	–3.83
Progressive Conservative	Frederick Young Craig	4,761	11.72	–3.96
Social Credit	Grayden B. McRae	1,382	3.40	–13.12
Communist	Robert C. McLaren	251	0.62	–
Total valid votes		40,621	99.44	
Total rejected ballots		228	0.56	–0.03
Turnout		40,849	78.25	+2.63
Eligible voters		52,204		
Liberal gain from New Democratic		Swing		+12.06
Source: Library of Parliament

1965 Canadian federal election
Party	Candidate	Votes	%	±%
New Democratic	Barry Mather	27,574	43.57	+6.61
Liberal	Chris Brown	15,330	24.22	–2.52
Social Credit	Joe Unwin	10,458	16.52	+2.00
Progressive Conservative	Walter C. MacDonald	9,925	15.68	–6.09
Total valid votes		63,287	99.41	
Total rejected ballots		374	0.59	+0.06
Turnout		63,661	75.62	–5.64
Eligible voters		84,183		
New Democratic hold		Swing		+4.57
Source: Library of Parliament

1963 Canadian federal election
Party	Candidate	Votes	%	±%
New Democratic	Barry Mather	23,609	36.96	–2.22
Liberal	F.H. Jackson	17,086	26.75	+3.96
Progressive Conservative	William McLennan	13,908	21.77	–0.12
Social Credit	Jack Burrows	9,280	14.53	–1.62
Total valid votes		63,883	99.48	
Total rejected ballots		337	0.52	–0.15
Turnout		64,220	81.26	+1.90
Eligible voters		79,027		
New Democratic hold		Swing		–3.09
Source: Library of Parliament

1962 Canadian federal election
Party	Candidate	Votes	%	±%
New Democratic	Barry Mather	23,827	39.18	+13.17
Liberal	F.H. Jackson	13,855	22.78	+13.81
Progressive Conservative	William McLennan	13,311	21.89	–19.83
Social Credit	Myrtle Everett	9,822	16.15	–5.27
Total valid votes		60,815	99.33	
Total rejected ballots		412	0.67	+0.01
Turnout		61,227	79.36	+2.56
Eligible voters		77,150		
New Democratic gain from Progressive Conservative		Swing		+0.79
Source: Library of Parliament

1958 Canadian federal election
Party	Candidate	Votes	%	±%
Progressive Conservative	William McLennan	21,202	41.72	+20.39
Co-operative Commonwealth	Douglas Stout	13,220	26.01	+2.22
Social Credit	George Hahn	10,886	21.42	–14.05
Liberal	Alex Stewart	4,559	8.97	–9.13
Labor–Progressive	Charles McGregor Stewart	958	1.88	–
Total valid votes		50,825	99.34	
Total rejected ballots		337	0.66	–0.17
Turnout		51,162	76.80	+0.03
Eligible voters		66,614		
Progressive Conservative gain from Social Credit		Swing		+9.08
Source: Library of Parliament

1957 Canadian federal election
Party	Candidate	Votes	%	±%
Social Credit	George Hahn	16,916	35.47	+4.47
Co-operative Commonwealth	W. Jack Jones	11,344	23.79	–2.86
Progressive Conservative	Ted Kuhn	10,172	21.33	+12.45
Liberal	Hugh McGivern	8,632	18.10	–12.80
Canadian Democrat	Gerry Goeujon	628	1.32	–
Total valid votes		47,692	99.17	
Total rejected ballots		399	0.83	+0.14
Turnout		48,091	76.77	+9.64
Eligible voters		62,642		
Social Credit hold		Swing		+4.06
Source: Library of Parliament

1953 Canadian federal election
Party	Candidate	Votes	%	±%
Social Credit	George Hahn	10,770	31.00	–
Liberal	William Mott	10,735	30.90	–4.31
Co-operative Commonwealth	Ronald William Irvine	9,258	26.65	+3.37
Progressive Conservative	William McFerran Adrain	3,083	8.87	–3.50
Labor–Progressive	Leo Albert Brady	896	2.58	–
Total valid votes		34,742	99.31	
Total rejected ballots		240	0.69	
Turnout		34,982	67.13	
Eligible voters		52,111		
Social Credit gain from Liberal		Swing		+17.66
Source: Library of Parliament

Canadian federal by-election, 24 October 1949 On Thomas Reid being called to the Senate, 7 September 1949
Party	Candidate	Votes	%	±%
Liberal	William Mott	8,727	35.21	–7.21
Independent	Elmore Philpott	6,583	26.56	–
Co-operative Commonwealth	Ronald William Irvine	5,769	23.28	–5.18
Progressive Conservative	Leslie James Christmas	3,068	12.38	–13.06
Labor–Progressive	Maurice Rush	637	2.57	–
Total valid votes		24,784	100.00	
Total rejected ballots		–		
Turnout		24,784	–	–
Eligible voters				
Liberal hold		Swing		–16.88
Source: Library of Parliament

1949 Canadian federal election
Party	Candidate	Votes	%	±%
Liberal	Thomas Reid	13,904	42.42	+8.61
Co-operative Commonwealth	Ronald William Irvine	9,326	28.45	–0.75
Progressive Conservative	Leslie James Christmas	8,338	25.44	–1.14
Social Credit	William Cameron McCallum	1,207	3.68	+0.33
Total valid votes		32,775	99.24	
Total rejected ballots		252	0.76	–0.13
Turnout		33,027	71.63	–6.28
Eligible voters		46,107		
Liberal hold		Swing		+4.68
Source: Library of Parliament

1945 Canadian federal election
Party	Candidate	Votes	%	±%
Liberal	Thomas Reid	14,158	33.81	–10.51
Co-operative Commonwealth	Albert Thomas Alsbury	12,229	29.20	+0.69
Progressive Conservative	George Oswald Twiss	11,133	26.58	–0.58
Labor–Progressive	Harold John Griffin	2,640	6.30	–
Social Credit	George Anderson Pollock	1,403	3.35	–
Democratic	Spencer Herbert Broatch	315	0.75	–
Total valid votes		41,878	99.11	
Total rejected ballots		377	0.89	–0.37
Turnout		42,255	77.91	–3.85
Eligible voters		54,234		
Liberal hold		Swing		–5.60
Source: Library of Parliament

1940 Canadian federal election
Party	Candidate	Votes	%	±%
Liberal	Thomas Reid	15,287	44.32	+7.46
Co-operative Commonwealth	A. Thomas Alsbury	9,837	28.52	–7.37
National Government	Thomas Robert Selkirk	9,372	27.17	+3.05
Total valid votes		34,496	98.74	
Total rejected ballots		440	1.26	+0.50
Turnout		34,936	81.76	+0.98
Eligible voters		42,728		
Liberal hold		Swing		+7.42
Source: Library of Parliament

1935 Canadian federal election
Party	Candidate	Votes	%	±%
Liberal	Thomas Reid	9,977	36.85	–19.01
Co-operative Commonwealth	Edwin Henry Baker	9,716	35.89	–
Conservative	John Hanna Nicholls Morgan	6,531	24.12	–20.01
Reconstruction	Charles Frederick Millar	850	3.14	–
Total valid votes		27,074	99.24	
Total rejected ballots		206	0.76	
Turnout		27,280	80.79	+7.90
Eligible voters		33,768		
Liberal hold		Swing		–27.45
Source: Library of Parliament

1930 Canadian federal election
Party	Candidate	Votes	%	±%
Liberal	Thomas Reid	13,293	55.86	+21.43
Conservative	William Garland McQuarrie	10,502	44.14	–2.38
Total valid votes		23,795	100.00	
Total rejected ballots		–		
Turnout		23,795	72.89	+1.15
Eligible voters		32,647		
Liberal gain from Conservative		Swing		+11.91
Source: Library of Parliament

1926 Canadian federal election
Party	Candidate	Votes	%	±%
Conservative	William Garland McQuarrie	8,624	46.51	+3.73
Liberal	Charles Cair Knight	6,384	34.43	–4.46
Labour	William Arthur Pritchard	3,533	19.06	+0.73
Total valid votes		18,541	100.00	
Total rejected ballots		–		
Turnout		18,541	71.73	–5.27
Eligible voters		25,848		
Conservative hold		Swing		+4.10
Source: Library of Parliament

1925 Canadian federal election
Party	Candidate	Votes	%	±%
Conservative	William Garland McQuarrie	7,714	42.78	–0.68
Liberal	Wells Gray	7,013	38.89	+11.48
Labour	Rose Henderson	3,305	18.33	–10.80
Total valid votes		18,032	100.00	
Total rejected ballots		–		
Turnout		18,032	77.00	+10.09
Eligible voters		23,419		
Conservative hold		Swing		–6.08
Source: Library of Parliament

1921 Canadian federal election
Party	Candidate	Votes	%	±%
Conservative	William Garland McQuarrie	5,520	43.46	–28.45
Labour	Richard Parmater Pettipiece	3,699	29.12	–
Liberal	John Reid	3,482	27.42	–
Total valid votes		12,701	100.00	
Total rejected ballots		–		
Turnout		12,701	66.91	–31.14
Eligible voters		18,983		
Conservative hold		Swing		–28.79
Source: Library of Parliament

1917 Canadian federal election
Party	Candidate	Votes	%	±%
Government (Unionist)	William Garland McQuarrie	7,380	71.92	+6.22
Opposition (Laurier Liberals)	Alexander Duncan McRae	2,882	28.08	–6.22
Total valid votes		10,262	100.00	
Total rejected ballots		–		
Turnout		10,262	98.05	+54.80
Eligible voters		10,466		
Government (Unionist) hold		Swing		+6.22
Source: Library of Parliament

1911 Canadian federal election
Party	Candidate	Votes	%	±%
Conservative	James Davis Taylor	3,542	65.70	+7.21
Liberal	John Oliver	1,849	34.30	–7.21
Total valid votes		5,391	100.00	
Total rejected ballots		–		
Turnout		5,391	43.25	–21.48
Eligible voters		12,465		
Conservative hold		Swing		+7.21
Source: Library of Parliament

1908 Canadian federal election
Party	Candidate	Votes	%	±%
Conservative	James Davis Taylor	2,846	58.49	+9.92
Liberal	Robert Jardine	2,020	41.51	–9.92
Total valid votes		4,866	100.00	
Total rejected ballots		–		
Turnout		4,866	64.72	–8.21
Eligible voters		7,518		
Conservative gain from Liberal		Swing		+9.92
Source: Library of Parliament

1904 Canadian federal election
Party	Candidate	Votes	%	±%
Liberal	James Buckham Kennedy	1,866	51.43	–0.70
Conservative	James Davis Taylor	1,762	48.57	+0.70
Total valid votes		3,628	100.00	
Total rejected ballots		–		
Turnout		3,628	72.94	+12.22
Eligible voters		4,974		
Liberal hold		Swing		–0.70
Source: Library of Parliament

1900 Canadian federal election
Party	Candidate	Votes	%	±%
Liberal	Aulay MacAulay Morrison	1,772	52.13	–2.50
Conservative	Edgar Dewdney	1,627	47.87	+2.50
Total valid votes		3,399	100.00	
Total rejected ballots		–		
Turnout		3,399	60.72	+23.31
Eligible voters		5,598		
Liberal hold		Swing		–2.50
Source: Library of Parliament

1896 Canadian federal election
Party	Candidate	Votes	%	±%
Liberal	Aulay MacAulay Morrison	1,758	54.63	+30.73
Conservative	Richard McBride	1,460	45.37	–30.73
Total valid votes		3,218	100.00	
Total rejected ballots		–		
Turnout		3,218	37.41	–6.42
Eligible voters		8,602		
Liberal gain from Conservative		Swing		+30.73
Source: Library of Parliament

1891 Canadian federal election
Party	Candidate	Votes	%	±%
Conservative	Gordon Edward Corbould	1,694	76.10	–
Liberal	Edwin Sayre Scoullar	532	23.90	–
Total valid votes		2,226	100.00	
Total rejected ballots		–		
Turnout		2,226	43.83	–
Eligible voters		5,079		
Conservative hold		Swing		–
Source: Library of Parliament

Canadian federal by-election, 19 June 1890 On the death of Donald Chisholm, 5 April 1890
Party	Candidate	Votes
Conservative	Gordon Edward Corbould	acclaimed
Source: Library of Parliament

1887 Canadian federal election
Party	Candidate	Votes	%	±%
Conservative	Donald Chisholm	533	69.13	–
Conservative	Thomas John Trapp	238	30.87	–
Total valid votes		771	100.00	
Total rejected ballots		–		
Turnout		771	47.68	–
Eligible voters		1,617		
Conservative gain from Liberal–Conservative		Swing		–
Source: Library of Parliament

1882 Canadian federal election
Party	Candidate	Votes
Liberal–Conservative	Joshua Homer	acclaimed
Source: Library of Parliament

Canadian federal by-election, 9 March 1882 On the resignation of Thomas Robert McInnes, 12 December 1881
Party	Candidate	Votes
Liberal–Conservative	Joshua Homer	acclaimed
Source: Library of Parliament

1878 Canadian federal election
Party	Candidate	Votes	%	±%
Independent	Thomas Robert McInnes	388	56.48	–
Unknown	James Alexander Robinson	299	43.52	–
Total valid votes		687	100.00	
Total rejected ballots		–		
Turnout		687	93.22	–
Eligible voters		737		
Independent hold		Swing		–
Source: Library of Parliament

Canadian federal by-election, 25 March 1878 On the resignation of James Cunningham, 22 January 1878
Party	Candidate	Votes
Independent	Thomas Robert McInnes	acclaimed
Source: Library of Parliament

1874 Canadian federal election
Party	Candidate	Votes	%	±%
Liberal	James Cunningham	162	53.29	–
Liberal–Conservative	Joshua Homer	142	46.71	–
Total valid votes		304	100.00	
Total rejected ballots		–		
Turnout		304	75.43	–
Eligible voters		403		
Liberal gain from Liberal–Conservative		Swing		–
Source: Library of Parliament

1872 Canadian federal election
Party	Candidate	Votes
Liberal–Conservative	Hugh Nelson	acclaimed
Source: Library of Parliament

== See also ==
- List of Canadian electoral districts
- Historical federal electoral districts of Canada
