= Barry Mather =

Canadian politician

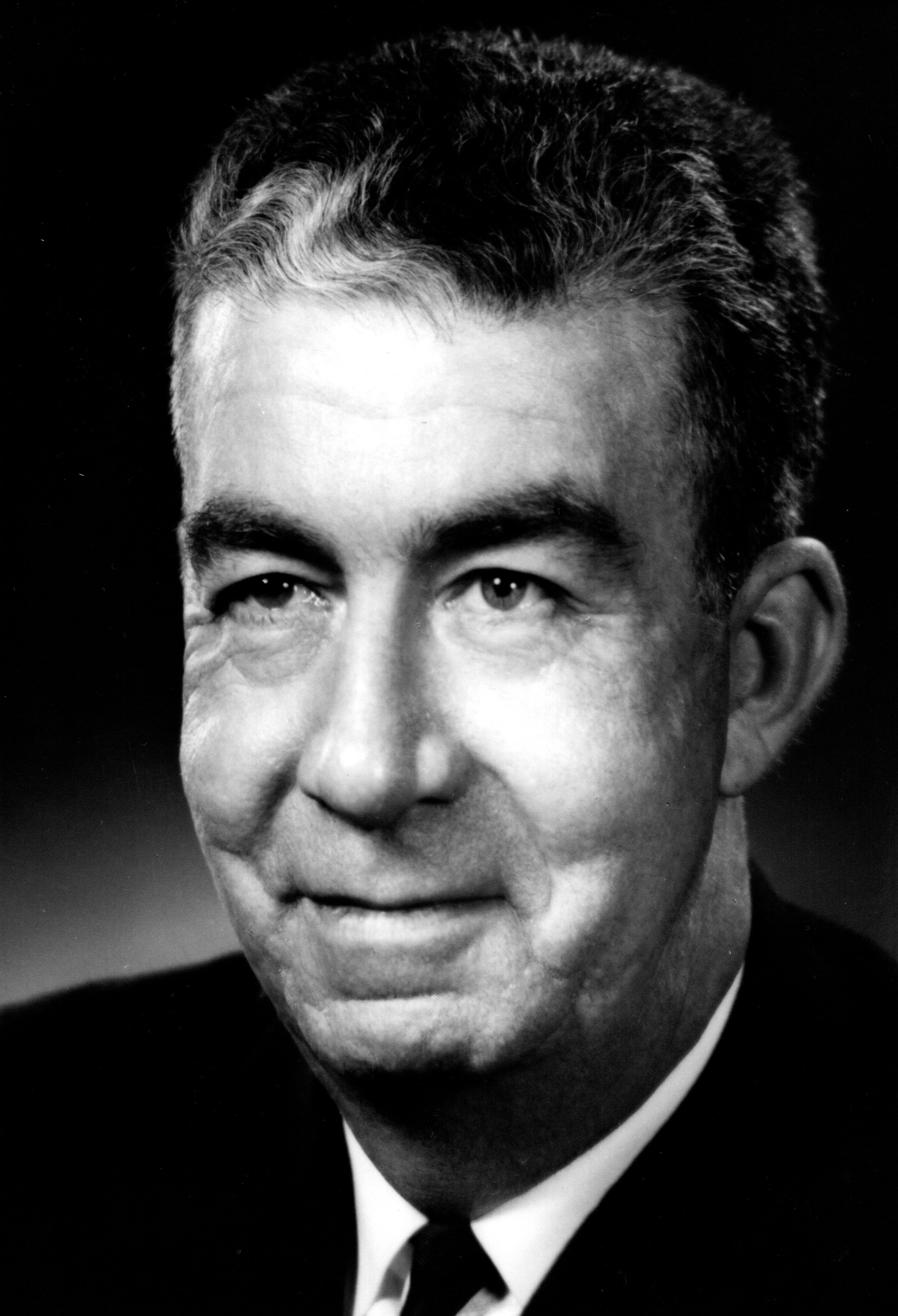

Member of the Canadian Parliament for New Westminster
- In office September 1962 – June 1968
- Preceded by: William McLennan
- Succeeded by: Douglas Hogarth

Member of the Canadian Parliament for Surrey
- In office June 1968 – October 1972
- Preceded by: District was created in 1966
- Succeeded by: District changed name in 1971 to Surrey—White Rock

Member of the Canadian Parliament for Surrey—White Rock
- In office October 1972 – May 1974
- Preceded by: District changed name in 1971 from Surrey
- Succeeded by: Benno Friesen

Personal details
- Born: 20 February 1909 Condor, Alberta, Canada
- Died: 30 March 1982 (aged 73) Nerja, Spain
- Party: New Democratic Party
- Profession: journalist

Barry Mather (20 February 1909 – 30 March 1982) was a Canadian journalist, columnist, and politician.

Born in Condor, Alberta, he was a journalist for the Vancouver News Herald and a columnist with The Vancouver Sun before being elected to the House of Commons of Canada in the 1962 federal election for the British Columbia riding of New Westminster. A member of the New Democratic Party, he was re-elected in the 1963, 1965, 1968, and 1972 elections in the ridings of New Westminster, Surrey, and Surrey—White Rock.

In 1965, he was the first Member of Parliament to introduce a freedom of information bill as a private member's bill. Although it didn't pass, he would re-introduce the same legislation in every parliamentary session between 1968 and 1974. In 1983, an Access to Information Act would finally be passed. Mather was also one of the first parliamentarians to call for restrictions on the sale of cigarettes; in 1969, he called for a ban on all cigarette advertising.

He was the co-author of the 1958 book, New Westminster, The Royal City. He was married to Camille Mather, a former Co-operative Commonwealth Federation member of the Legislative Assembly of British Columbia in the riding of Delta. They had two daughters: Mary and Jane.

He died of a heart attack during a vacation in Nerja in 1982.
