= William McLennan =

William McLennan is the name of:

- Scotty McLennan (born 1948 as William L. McLennan Jr.), American minister, lawyer and academic
- Bill McLennan (1942–2022), Australian statistician
- William McLennan (politician) (1903–1980), Canadian Member of Parliament
- Bill McLennan (rugby league) (1927–2007), New Zealand rugby league international
- William McLennan (cricketer) (fl. 1880), New Zealand cricketer
