= District =

Administrative division in some countries, managed by a local government

A district is a type of administrative division that in some countries is managed by the local government. Across the world, areas known as "districts" vary greatly in size, spanning regions or counties, several municipalities, subdivisions of municipalities, school district, or political district.

== Etymology ==
The word "district" in English is a loan word from French. It comes from Medieval Latin districtus–"exercising of justice, restraining of offenders".

The earliest known English-language usage dates to 1611, in the work of lexicographer Randle Cotgrave.

== By country or territory ==
=== Afghanistan ===
In Afghanistan, a district (Persian / Pashto: ولسوالۍ Wuleswali) is a subdivision of a province. There are almost 400 districts in the country.

=== Australia ===
Electoral districts are used in state elections. Districts were also used in several states as cadastral units for land titles. Some were used as squatting districts. New South Wales had several different types of districts used in the 21st century.

=== Austria ===
In Austria, the word Bezirk is used with different meanings in three different contexts:

- Some of the tasks of the administrative branch of the national and regional governments are fulfilled by the 95 district administrative offices (Bezirkshauptmannschaften). The area a district administrative office is responsible for is often, although informally, called a district (Bezirk). A number of statutory cities, currently 15, are not served by any district administrative office. Their respective municipal bureaucracies handle the tasks normally performed by the district administrative office.
- The cities of Vienna and Graz are divided into municipal districts (Stadtbezirke), assisting the respective municipal governments. In Vienna, the constituents of each district elect a district council (Bezirksvertretung); the district council in turn elects a district chairperson (Bezirksvorsteher). Although the city vests its districts with a limited amount of budgetary autonomy, district councils and chairpersons have little real responsibility. In particular, they do not legislate. Most of the districts of Vienna were independent municipalities at some point; district councils and chairpersons symbolize the town councils and mayors they used to have.
- From the point of view of the judiciary of Austria, the country is subdivided into 115 judicial districts (Gerichtsbezirke), each corresponding to one of the country's 115 lowest-level trial courts.

=== Azerbaijan ===
Azerbaijan is administratively divided into the following subdivisions:

- 59 districts (rayonlar; sing.– rayon),
- 11 cities (şəhərlər; sing.– şəhər),
- 1 autonomous republic (muxtar respublika), which itself contains:
  - 7 districts
  - 1 city

The rayons are further divided into municipalities (bələdiyyə).

Additionally, Azerbaijan is subdivided into 9 (economic) regions (İqtisadi Rayonlar; sing.– İqtisadi Rayon). This is not an administrative division. Each region contains a number of districts. The Nakhchivan Autonomous Republic forms a separate, 10th economic region.

1. Absheron 2. Ganja-Qazakh 3. Shaki-Zaqatala 4. Lankaran 5. Quba-Khachmaz 6. Aran 7. Upper Karabakh 8. Kalbajar-Lachin 9. Daglig-Shirvan 10. Nakhchivan

=== Bangladesh ===
Bangladeshi districts are local administrative units. In all, there are 64 districts in Bangladesh. Originally, there were 21 greater districts with several subdivisions in each district. In 1984, the government made all these subdivisions into districts. Each district has several sub-districts called Upazila in Bengali with a total 493 Upzillas.

=== Belgium ===
In Belgian municipalities with more than 100,000 inhabitants, on the initiative of the local council, sub-municipal administrative entities with elected councils may be created. As such, only Antwerp, having over 460,000 inhabitants, became subdivided into nine districts (Dutch: districten).

The Belgian arrondissements (also in French as well as in Dutch), an administrative level between province (or the capital region) and municipality, or the lowest judicial level, are in English, sometimes called districts as well.

=== Bhutan ===
Bhutanese districts (dzongkhag) are local administrative units consisting of village blocks called gewog. Some have subdistricts called dungkhag.

=== Bosnia and Herzegovina ===
In Bosnia and Herzegovina, a district is a self-governing administrative unit.

==== Brčko District ====
Brčko District in northeastern Bosnia and Herzegovina is formally part of both the Republika Srpska and the Federation of Bosnia and Herzegovina. The Assembly of the Brčko District has 29 seats.

=== Botswana ===
Districts are the first-level administrative divisions of Botswana, alongside town councils and city councils. Each of the ten districts have their own district councils.

=== Brazil ===
Brazilian municipalities are subdivided into districts. Small municipalities usually have only one urban district, which contains the city itself, consisting of the seat of the local government, where the municipality's prefeitura and câmara de vereadores (City Hall and City Council, respectively, the Executive and Legislative local bodies) are located. The rural districts and groups of urban districts (mainly in large cities) may also present a sub local Executive body, named subprefeitura.

=== Brunei ===
A district is known locally as daerah and it is the first-level administrative division of Brunei. There are four districts in the country, namely Brunei-Muara, Tutong, Belait and Temburong. Each district is administered by a Jabatan Daerah (District Office), which is headed by a Pegawai Daerah (District Officer). All district offices are government departments under the Ministry of Home Affairs (Malay: Kementerian Hal Ehwal Dalam Negeri).

=== Canada ===
==== Alberta ====
In Alberta, the municipal districts and improvement districts are types of rural municipalities. They are recognized as census subdivisions by Statistics Canada, which form parts of census divisions.

==== British Columbia ====
In the province of British Columbia, there are several kinds of administrative districts by that name. The usual usage is a reference to district municipalities, which are a class of municipality in the same hierarchy as city, town, or village. Most are styled, e.g., "District of Mission" or "District of Wells", though some are styled, e.g., "Corporation of Delta" or "Township of Langley".

Within the area of municipal powers, regional districts – which are somewhat analogous to counties in other jurisdictions, a number of municipalities, and unincorporated areas – are always referred to as "regional districts" to distinguish them from district municipalities and other kinds of district.

Other kinds of districts in British Columbia are:

- Electoral districts (some early ridings, as electoral districts are commonly known, included "district" in their title, e.g. New Westminster District)
- Forest districts, which are a set of administrative regions of the British Columbia Ministry of Forests
- Land districts, which are the underlying cadastral survey system for the province and are the primary locational reference used in government databases and references. The primary use of "district" in combinations such as the Lillooet District or New Westminster District was a reference to the land district, though sometimes to mining divisions.
- School districts, also often referred to simply as "districts", when in context.
- Other types of regional subdivision, according to the ministry or agency, are generally styled "region" or "area". These include as Ministry of Environment regions, health regions, and regional management planning areas such as the Muskwa-Kechika Management Planning Area.

==== New Brunswick ====
New Brunswick has numerous local service districts, 7 school districts, 10 federal electoral districts and 55 provincial electoral districts.

==== Northwest Territories ====
In western and northern Canada, the federal government created districts as subdivisions of the Northwest Territories 1870–1905, partly on the model of the districts created in the Province of Canada. The first district created was the District of Keewatin in 1876 followed by four more districts in 1882. Gradually, these districts became separate territories (such as Yukon), separate provinces (such as Alberta and Saskatchewan) or were absorbed into other provinces.

==== Ontario ====
In Ontario, a district is a statutory subdivision of the province, but, unlike a county, a district is not incorporated. Most districts are composed of unincorporated lands, mostly Crown land. Originally present-day Southern Ontario (then part of the Province of Quebec and after 1791, Upper Canada) was divided into districts in 1788 . Districts continued to operation until 1849 when they were replaced by counties by the Province of Canada.

The current Ontario districts such as Algoma and Nipissing were first created by the Province of Canada in 1858 prior to Confederation for the delivery of judicial and provincial government services to sparsely populated areas from the district seat (e.g. Sault Ste. Marie). Some districts may have District Social Service Administration Boards, which are designed to provide certain social services. The boundaries of a federal census division may correspond to those of a district.

==== Quebec ====
In Quebec, districts are municipal electoral subdivisions of boroughs, which are subdivisions of cities. They function in a similar manner to what is elsewhere known as a ward.

=== China ===
==== Hong Kong ====
Hong Kong is divided into eighteen districts, each with a district council.

==== Mainland China ====
On Mainland China, the district (Chinese: 市辖区; pinyin: shìxiá qū) is a subdivision of any of various city administrative units, including direct-administered municipalities, sub-provincial municipalities, and prefecture-level cities. Districts have county-level status.

Modern districts are a recent innovation. In the context of pre-modern China, the English translation "district" is typically associated with xian (縣; xiàn), another Chinese administrative division. The xian is translated as "county" in the context of modern China.

=== Colombia ===
In Colombia, a district is one of ten special administrative units:

- Barranquilla (Special Industrial Port District)
- Cartagena Tourism and Cultural District
- Bogotá (Capital District)
- Santa Marta (Historical, Tourism and Cultural District)
- Tunja (Historical and Cultural District)
- Popayán (Special, Ecotouristic, Historical and Universitarian District)
- Turbo (Special Port District)
- Tumaco (Special Industrial, Port, Biodiverse and Ecotouristic District)
- Cúcuta (Special Border and Touristic District)
- Buenaventura (Special Industrial, Port, Biodiverse and Ecotouristic District)

=== Czechia ===
A "district" in Czechia is an okres (plural okresy). After a reform in 2002, the districts lost administrative power to regions (kraje) and selected towns (pověřené obce) and became statistical zones.

=== France ===
French districts were the first subdivision of the départements from 4 March 1790 to the 28 pluviôse an VIII (17 February 1800). Then, in the 20th century, districts were a type of intercommunity, they've been replaced by communauté de communes and communautés d'agglomération after 1999.

=== Germany ===
- In Germany, a district (Kreis) is an administrative unit between the Länder (German federal states) and the local / municipal levels (Gemeinden). As of 2011, most of the 402 German districts are Landkreise, rural districts. 107 larger cities (usually with more than 100,000 inhabitants) that do not belong to a district are considered as urban districts (Kreisfreie Städte or Stadtkreise).
  - A local subdistrict is called a Gemarkung, and is mostly a smaller rural area (with similar concepts in Austria and Switzerland). A Gemarkung is usually associated with and named after a central town or village. Areas in such subdistricts and their usage are documented in central registries (German: Kataster) and have been historically used for taxation.
- In some states, there is additional level of administration between the Länder and the Landkreise called Regierungsbezirk (government district).
- District (Bezirk) was also an administrative subdivision of the German Democratic Republic from 1952. See Administrative division of the German Democratic Republic
- City district (Stadtbezirk or Ortsbezirk) is the primary subdivision category of many Kreisfreie Städte.

=== Hungary ===
175 districts were established on 1 January 2013. The existing 19 counties are subdivided into 6–18 districts per county. The capital city of Budapest does not belong to any counties and is already divided to 23 districts.

=== India ===
Districts of India

India's districts are local administrative units inherited from the British Raj. Districts in India are the main administrative units below a State or Union Territory. They originally developed for land revenue and tax collection, and they still play a major role in those functions. Officially, they are known as revenue districts. Districts are also used for planning, implementation of development programmes, and delivery of government services, and many government departments organise their field offices around district boundaries. In some states, districts are grouped into divisions, which function as an administrative layer below the subnational state.

The local government at the district level is the District Panchayat (Zilla Parishad), but its jurisdiction excludes the urban areas of the district, which are governed by municipalities.

The district administration is headed by a District Collector, / District Magistrate, / Deputy Commissioner. The head of the district administration is usually a career civil servant, typically an IAS officer. The headquarters of the district administration is known as the Collectorate. Other key responsibilities include the collection of revenue, land management, co-ordination and disaster management. Usually, the Deputy Commissioner/District Collector is granted magisterial powers under section 14 of Bharatiya Nyaya Sanhita, 2023, and designated as the District Magistrate. The official designations are "Collector and District Magistrate" or "Deputy Commissioner and District Magistrate".

Districts are most frequently further sub-divided into smaller administrative units, called either taluks or tehsils or mandals or mavattams, depending on the region. These units have specific local responsibilities, including in particular coordinating revenue collection. An intermediate level (the sub-division) between district and tehsil/taluka may be formed by grouping these units under the oversight of Assistant Commissioners, Sub-collectors or Sub-divisional magistrates. Each district includes one or two cities (or large towns), a few smaller towns and dozens of villages. Most of the Indian districts have the same name as their main town or city.

A district in Kerala

As of April 2016, the National Informatics Centre of the Government of India, lists a total of 664 districts in India, more than the number of parliamentary constituencies (545). This number went up to a total of 723 districts in 2019.

=== Indonesia ===
In Western New Guinea, one of the seven regions of Indonesia, a distrik is a subdivision of a regency or a city. Formerly it was called a kecamatan. In translations of most official documents, kecamatan itself is translated into English as "district", but some other documents (especially from older era) translated it to "subdistrict", which is equivalent to a kelurahan in recent translations. This translation ambiguity has caused confusions among foreigners. Distrik or kecamatan do not have legal autonomy to govern themselves, because they are only administrative extensions of a regency or a city.

=== Iran ===
Iran is subdivided into thirty one provinces (Persian: استان ostān), each governed from a local center, usually the largest local city, which is called the capital (Persian: Markaz) of that province. The provinces of Iran further subdivided into counties called (Persian: شهرستان shahrestān), an area inside an ostān, and consists of a city center, few bakhsh (Persian: بخش) and many villages around them. There are usually a few cities (Persian: شهر shahr) and rural agglomerations (Persian: دهستان dehestān) in each county. Rural agglomerations are a collection of a number of villages. One of the cities of the county is appointed as the capital of the county. The word shahrestān comes from the Persian words shahr and ostān, which mean city (or town) and province, respectively. The nearest equivalent of shahrestān in English would be sub-province or county. Each shahrestān has a governmental office known as farmandari which coordinates different events and governmental offices. The farmandar, or the head of farmandari, is the governor of the shahrestān which is the highest governmental authority in the division.

=== Iraq ===
In Iraq, they use the word qadaa for districts. There are over a hundred districts, each district being within one of 18 Iraqi governorates, sometimes known as provinces. The district generally (but not always) bears the name of a city within that district, usually the capital of that district.

=== Japan ===
A district (郡, gun) is a local administrative unit comprising towns and villages but not cities. See districts of Japan for a more complete description. In 1923, its administrative role was abolished although it is still in use for addressing purposes. "District" is also a translation of chiku, defined by Japan's planning law.

=== Kenya ===
In Kenya, a district (wilayah) is a subdivision of a Province and is headed by a District Officer (DO).

=== Malawi ===
Malawi is divided into 28 districts within three regions. Each district is headed by a District Commissioner.

=== Malaysia ===
A district is known as Daerah in Malay. A district governed directly by the federal government is known as a Federal Territory, and they are Kuala Lumpur, Labuan, and Putrajaya.

In East Malaysia, a district is a subdivision within a division of a state. For example, Tuaran is a district within the West Coast Division of Sabah. A district is usually named after the main town or its administrative capital, for example, Sandakan town is the capital of the district of Sandakan, as well the capital of Sandakan Division (note: Sandakan district is a sub-division of Sandakan Division).

In Peninsular Malaysia, a district is a division of a state. A mukim is a subdivision of a district. The mukim, is however, of less importance with respect to the administration of local government.

In Malaysia, each district will have a District Office, headed by a district officer, and is administered by a local government either being a District Council, Municipal Council, or a City Council. In some highly urbanized districts, there may be further subdivisions. For example, the district of Petaling in Selangor is administered by 3 local governments: Shah Alam City Council, Petaling Jaya City Council, and Subang Jaya Municipal Council. Another example is the district of Johor Bahru in Johor, which has 3 subdivisions: Johor Bahru City Council, Iskandar Puteri City Council, and Pasir Gudang Municipal Council. Conversely, there may be one local government administering more than one district, for example, Seberang Perai Municipal Council administers the districts of Central Seberang Perai, North Seberang Perai, and South Seberang Perai; as well as Kuala Terengganu City Council, which administers the districts of Kuala Terengganu and Kuala Nerus.

An administrative district border and an electoral district border (constituency) transcend each other and do not correspond with each other in most instances.

=== Malta ===
Malta holds 13 Electoral Divisions for the unicameral (single-assembly) parliament. Each consists of a number of localities (although there is no requirement that electoral boundaries follow the boundaries of localities).

=== Mauritius ===
The districts of the Republic of Mauritius are the second-order administrative divisions after the Outer islands of the country. Mauritius is divided into nine districts which consist of 2 cities, 4 towns and 130 villages, the capital is Port Louis.

The island of Rodrigues used to be the tenth district of Mauritius but it gained autonomous status in 2002.

=== Nauru ===
The districts of Nauru are the only subdivisions of the whole state.

=== Nepal ===
Nepal is divided into 77 districts. Each district acts as an independent administrative unit. A district consists of two types of units like Rural Municipalities and Municipalities. Official documents like citizenship cards and passports are issued by the Chief of District Office (CDO). Constituencies for elections are also constructed according to the population distribution within the district.

=== New Zealand ===
A district in New Zealand is a territorial authority (second-tier local government unit) that has not gained the distinction of being proclaimed a city. Districts tend to be less urbanized, tend to cover more than one population center and a larger amount of rural area, and tend to have a smaller population than cities. While cities and districts are generally considered to be two different types of territorial authority, the area covered by a city is often known as its district—for example the term district plan is used equally in districts and cities. The Chatham Islands Territory is neither a district nor a city.

A district is not always a simple division of a region: several districts lie within two regions, and the Taupō District lies in four.

=== Pakistan ===
Districts of Pakistan are local administrative units inherited from the British Raj. They form third-level Administrative Division in Pakistan after Provinces and Divisions. Districts were generally grouped into administrative divisions, which in turn formed provinces. Pakistan has 160 districts (including ten in Azad Jammu and Kashmir). They are known as zillas in Urdu. They comprise villages, towns, and cities. A district is headed by a district nazim (mayor), who is an elected official (in local body elections) and the local controller of the district level officers of all the departments under provincial government, while Deputy Commissioner is the executive head of the District usually Grade-18 officer from Pakistan Administrative Service. Deputy Commissioner is entrusted with overall responsibility of law & order, implementation of government schemes and is also authorized to hear revenue cases pertaining to the district. The district mayor (nazim) heads an elected district council composed of councilors, who represent various district-level constituencies. The councils have a constitutional requirement to be composed of a minimum of 33% women or more than that.

=== Philippines ===
The usage of the term 'district' (distrito) in the Philippines has similarities to that in the United States.

==== Legislative ====
===== National =====
A constituency with a representative in the lower house of Congress is a congressional district. However, the term congressional district has become synonymous in local parlance with 'representative district,' because, just like in the US, the word 'congress' (konggreso) has come to refer specifically to the lower house (the House of Representatives).

A legislative district, which has an average population of about 250,000 to 500,000, may be composed of:

(a.) an entire province, (b.) within a province, a group of municipalities and cities (sometimes even including independent and highly urbanized cities geographically located in the province), (c.) a single city, (d.) a group of geographically adjacent independent cities and independent municipalities (currently the only example is the Pateros-Taguig, or (e.) a group of barangays within a city.

Each province is guaranteed at least one representative to the lower house, even though it may not come close to having the same population as other legislative districts. Only voters within each district are allowed to vote in the election for the member of the House of Representatives from that district.

From 1916 to 1935, the Philippines were divided into 12 senatorial districts, of which 11 elected two members each, for a total of 22 out of the 24 members of the upper house of Congress (the Senate). Since 1935 senators have been elected at large.

===== Regional =====
In addition, each congressional district that falls under the jurisdiction of the Autonomous Region in Muslim Mindanao (a total of 8) elects three members each to the country's only subnational legislative assembly.

===== Provincial =====
There are provincial districts for the purpose of electing Sangguniang Panlalawigan (Provincial Council) members, which follow the congressional district arrangement, except that independent and highly urbanized cities whose charters prevent them from electing provincial officials are excluded. Also, provinces that comprise a lone congressional district are divided into at least two provincial districts.

===== City =====
There are also city councilor districts for the purpose of electing Sangguniang Panlungsod (City Council) members, which follow the congressional district arrangement. In cases where the city does not form two or more congressional districts by itself, it is divided into at least two city council districts.

==== Administrative ====
===== Current =====
Districts exist as administrative entities only in local government, with limited powers or responsibilities. Certain cities, such as Manila, Iloilo and Davao, for administrative purposes, formally divide their jurisdictions into city districts composed of several barangays, but the extent of these district-level administrative powers vary. Several barangays (the lowest level of government) also have the word 'district' in their names – examples are those in Jala-jala and Zamboanga City. However, this is solely for the purpose of nomenclature, and does not imply a higher level of local government.

===== Historical =====
During Spanish and early American colonial rule, certain areas of the Philippines were designated as 'districts,' mainly those that had not been formally organized into provinces or incorporated into existing ones. In the American era, cities and municipalities were divided into city and municipal districts, which served as the lowest level of government before the creation of the barangay.

==== Special-purpose districts ====
Special-purpose districts also exist in the Philippines, created for government departments and agencies. Examples are school districts for the Department of Education (DepEd), engineering districts for the Department of Public Works and Highways (DPWH), and coast guard districts for the Philippine Coast Guard (PCG).

==== Informal districts ====
Some cities and municipalities also extend the usage of the word 'district' to refer to certain areas, even without having any formal administrative purposes. Examples are the central business districts in Naga, Camarines Sur, and Makati.

=== Poland ===
The second-level unit of local government and administration in Poland, equivalent to a county, district or prefecture (LAU-1) in other countries is called a powiat. As of 2008, there are 379 powiat-level entities in Poland: 314 land counties and 65 city counties. For a complete alphabetical listing, see list of counties in Poland.

=== Portugal ===
Districts (distritos) are administrative divisions of Portugal. They were mainly used as the jurisdiction areas for the civil governors, the government officials that represented locally the Central Government. However, in 2011, the role of the civil governor was de facto extinct (although not de jure), with the decision taken by the Government not to appoint new civil governors and to transfer its functions to other bodies. The district areas are now only used as the regional jurisdiction areas of some public bodies (like the Public Security Police district commands) and some private entities (like the district associations and championships of football).

=== Russia ===
In Russia, districts are administrative and municipal divisions of the federal subjects, as well as administrative divisions of larger cities ("city districts") which are commonly referenced as raion (Russian: Районы) and okrug (Russian: Округа) respectively. The term "district" is also used to refer to the type of administrative division of the Sakha Republic—ulus (Russian: улус; Yakut: улуус). The Sakha Republic is administratively divided into five cities under the Republic's jurisdiction and 33 uluses. The law of the Sakha Republic establishes that the terms ulus and "district" are equivalent.

In historical context (for the Russian Empire), the term "district" is often used to refer to uyezd.

=== Serbia ===
Serbia is divided into twenty-nine districts (okrug) and the city of Belgrade, each of which is further divided into municipalities (opština)

=== Slovakia ===
In Slovakia, a district (okres) is a local administrative unit.

=== South Africa ===
Districts of South Africa

In South Africa, the district municipality forms the layer of government below the provinces. A district municipality is in turn divided into several local municipalities.

This structure varies in the eight largest urban areas:

1. Bloemfontein (seat of the Mangaung Metropolitan Municipality),
2. Cape Town (City of Cape Town Metropolitan Municipality),
3. Durban (seat of the eThekwini Metropolitan Municipality),
4. East London / King Williams Town (seat of the Buffalo City Metropolitan Municipality),
5. East Rand (seat of the Ekurhuleni Metropolitan Municipality),
6. Johannesburg (City of Johannesburg Metropolitan Municipality),
7. Port Elizabeth incl. Uitenhage (seat of the Nelson Mandela Bay Metropolitan Municipality) and
8. Pretoria (seat of the City of Tshwane Metropolitan Municipality),

where a metropolitan municipality replaces both a district and a local municipality.

=== South Korea ===
A district (gu) is a subdivision of larger cities in South Korea. Smaller cities have no districts, whereas districts in Seoul and six Metropolitan Cities are treated as a city in their own right.

=== Sri Lanka ===
For purposes of local government, the country of Sri Lanka is divided into nine provinces: Western, Central, Southern, Northern, Eastern, North Western, North Central, Uva, and Sabaragamuwa. (The Northern and Eastern Provinces have however, technically been jointly administered since 1988.)

Each of the districts is divided into divisions. These were originally based on the feudal counties, the korale and rata. They were formerly known as 'D.R.O. Divisions' after the 'Divisional Revenue Officer'. Later the D.R.O.s became 'Assistant Government Agents' and the Divisions were known as 'A.G.A. Divisions'. Currently, the Divisions are administered by a 'Divisional Secretary', and are known as a 'D.S. Divisions'. Rural D.S. Divisions are also administered by a 'Pradeshiya Sabha' (Sinhala for 'Regional Council'), which is elected.

=== Sweden ===
Some municipalities in the Kingdom of Sweden have divided their territory into smaller areas, which often are assigned an administrative board responsible for certain elements of municipal governance within their district. These areas take a variety of different Swedish names; however, "district" is usually the official English term for them. The term "borough" is sometimes used in unofficial contexts.

=== Switzerland ===
In Switzerland, some cantons organize themselves into districts, while others dispense with districts and govern themselves at the Wahlkreise (constituency or electoral district) level.

=== Taiwan ===
In the Republic of China on Taiwan, the district (Chinese: 區; pinyin: Qū) is the 3rd level of the administrative division. It is a division of special municipality and provincial city of Taiwan Province. Currently, there are 157 districts in total from 5 special municipalities and 3 provincial cities.

=== Thailand ===
A district (amphoe) is a subdivision of a province (changwat) in Thailand. Some provinces also contain minor districts (กิ่งอำเภอ), which are smaller than the average district.

=== Turkey ===
In Turkey, a district (Turkish: ilçe) is an administrative subdivision of a province (Turkish: il). They are governed by a district governor (kaymakam) appointed by the Ministry of the Interior, and an elected mayor.

In Turkey, a district (ilçe) is the administrative division following the province (il). Legislation stipulates that, in terms of Turkey's central administrative structure, provinces (il) are divided into districts (ilçe) and districts into sub-districts (bucak or nahiye), taking into account geographical conditions, economic circumstances and the requirements of public services; however, sub-districts, also known as nahiye, have been abolished. The district governor (kaymakam) is the administrative head of the district and administers this administrative division on behalf of the governor (vali), who is the administrative head of the province or vilayet. As stipulated in the legislation, the powers granted to the governor may also be exercised by the district governor in the district. Indeed, the word kaymakam comes from ‘kaim-i makam’, meaning "stand in" or "deputy". The word district, as an administrative division, emerged during the period of Republic of Turkey. The word kaza was used during the Ottoman administration and the early years of the Republic of Turkey. Kaza is related to the word kadi, also known as kazi. Indeed, during the Ottoman period, kazas were administered by kadis.

In Turkey, according to the legislation, the name of the town or village designated as the administrative centre is given to the district. However, if there is a historical or geographical name, it is possible to use this as the name as an exception. For example, when the district of Şenkaya was established in 1946, the name of the village of Örtülü, which was chosen as the administrative centre, was first changed to Şenkaya. The fact that the village of İd was first given the name Narman and then Narman district was established in 1954 is also an application in line with this legislation. In Turkey, the fact that the name of any district is also the name of the city (şehir) or town (kasaba) that is the administrative centre of that district is an application introduced by the ‘Provincial Administration Law’.

=== Ukraine ===
In Ukraine, districts (raions) second level of administrative division of Ukraine and are primarily the most common division of Ukrainian regions, as well as administrative divisions of larger cities ("city districts").

=== United Kingdom ===
==== England ====
Districts are the most recognizable form of local government in large parts of England. For those areas that retain two-tier local government, districts usually form the lower tier of that arrangement, with counties forming the upper tier. Districts tend to have responsibility for a number of areas including:

- Tax collection (Council Tax and non-domestic rates)
- Leisure services
- Refuse collection
- Housing
- Planning
- Arts and entertainment
- Environmental health

Each district raises taxes from residents on behalf of itself, and the upper-tier authority through the Council Tax. It also raises income from business through the non-domestic rates system, which is coordinated nationally.

==== Northern Ireland ====
Northern Ireland is divided into 11 districts for local government purposes. The councils do not carry out the same range of functions as those in the rest of the United Kingdom; for example, they have no responsibility for education, road-building or housing (although they do nominate members to the advisory Northern Ireland Housing Council).

Their functions include waste and recycling services, leisure and community services, building control and local economic and cultural development. They are not planning authorities, but are consulted on some planning applications. The collection of rates (local tax) is handled by the Rate Collection Agency.

==== Scotland ====
Districts of Scotland were local government areas between 1975 and 1996.

Between 1930 and 1975, districts were subdivisions of counties, formed under the Local Government (Scotland) Act 1929. See List of local government areas in Scotland 1930–75. Scotland, since 1996, has been divided into 32 unitary council areas, and districts are no longer used.

Scotland has had other kinds of administrative areas which might be described as districts:

- Shires of Scotland, until 1975
- Subdivisions of Scotland, councils or unitary authorities, from 1996, pursuant to the Local Government etc. (Scotland) Act 1994
- Committee areas, from 1996, within larger unitary authorities

==== Wales ====
There is no official use of the word district in Wales. The country is broken up into 22 unitary authorities. However, district may be used informally for a whole or unofficial part of a ward in a city.

=== United States ===
There are several types of districts in the United States.

==== Federal District ====
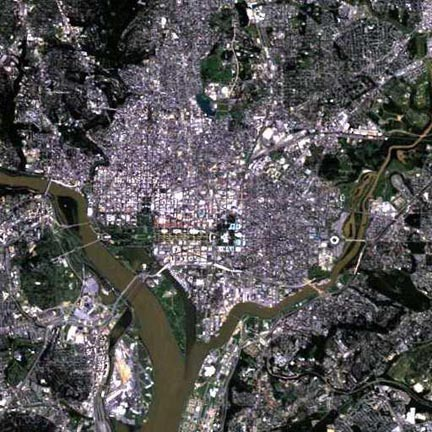
Satellite photograph of the District of Columbia.

The District of Columbia is the only part of the United States, excluding territories, that is not located within any of the fifty states.

==== Legislative constituencies ====
A constituency with a representative in Congress is a congressional district. Each state is organized into one or more such districts; the exact number within each state is based on the most recent census. Only voters within each district are allowed to vote in the election for the member of the House of Representatives from that district. Overall, there are 435 congressional districts in the United States; each has roughly 760,000 people, with some variance.

A constituency with a representative in a state legislature is a legislative district.

City councils that are not elected at-large may have constituencies called districts or wards.

==== Federal judicial districts ====
The territory over which a federal court has jurisdiction is a federal judicial district. In more than half of the states, a federal judicial district is coextensive with the state. In other states there is more than one such district.

==== Single-purpose districts ====
The United States also has many types of special-purpose districts with limited powers of local government. School districts are the most common, but other types of districts include community college districts, hospital districts, utility districts, irrigation districts, port districts, and public transit districts. Government organizations which provide public transit services may be named either an authority (The Washington Metropolitan Area Transit Authority operates rail and bus services in the Washington, DC area) or a district (the Sacramento Regional Transit District operates bus service in the state capital of California, Sacramento) or will sometimes change from one to the other (in 1963, the Metropolitan Transit Authority in Los Angeles, California was losing large amounts of money, so it was reorganized as the Southern California Rapid Transit District (known as RTD) in 1964. In 1993, RTD was combined with the Los Angeles County Transportation Commission, to form the Los Angeles County Metropolitan Transit Authority.)

Many cities in the late 20th century adopted names for non-governmental districts as a way of increasing the recognition and identity of these distinct areas and neighborhoods. Perhaps most apparently in Los Angeles, various areas and neighborhoods within the city are specified as districts. For instance, Hollywood is a district of Los Angeles, whereas Beverly Hills and West Hollywood are independent incorporated cities, with their own governments and police departments. This can be confusing, as the difference between districts and neighboring cities is usually not readily apparent, for they all make up the Greater Los Angeles area. Typically, districts may or may not be distinguished at the boundary of the district with a "district sign" with the city's insignia; whereas at a city boundary, a city limit sign would usually be placed on the street with the city's name and population, at a minimum, but also often includes its elevation. The important distinction is that areas classified as districts are still part of the parent city and governed by the laws and ordinances of that city.

Various federal, regional, and local agencies such as the National Register of Historic Places recognized historic districts.

==== Municipalities ====
From the late 18th century until the Philadelphia Act of Consolidation in 1854, districts were politically independent municipalities made up of densely populated neighborhoods adjacent to but outside the legal boundaries of the City of Philadelphia. Northern Liberties, Southwark, and Spring Garden were among the ten largest municipalities by population in the United States.

==== Municipal utility districts ====
A municipal utility district (MUD) is a special-purpose district or other jurisdiction that provides services (such as electricity, natural gas, sewage treatment, waste collection/management, wholesale telecommunications, and water) to district residents. Local residents may vote to establish a municipal utility district, which is represented by a board of directors elected by constituents. Municipal utilities are nonprofit government entities that serve at either the local or state level.

In the United States, public utility districts (PUD) have similar functions to municipal utility districts, but are created by a local government body such as a city or county, and have no authority to levy taxes. They provide public utilities to the residents of that district.

PUDs are created by a local government body, such as a city, county, or metropolitan service area (two or more communities joining for public utility purposes). Normally the districts are non-profit. PUDs are often governed by a commission, which may be appointed or elected.

In Texas, the Texas Commission on Environmental Quality (TCEQ) or the Texas Legislature may establish MUDs. In 2016, about 949 MUDs were in Texas, with about 65% of them in unincorporated suburban areas in Greater Houston. As of that year, there were 389, 146, and 85 MUDs in Harris, Fort Bend, and Montgomery counties, respectively.

=== Vietnam ===
The term district in Vietnam refers to the second-level administrative unit, below provinces (tỉnh) and municipalities (thành phố trực thuộc trung ương). This second level unit is called a huyện (counties) in rural areas, while in urban areas districts are either quận (subdivisions of municipalities), Thành phố trực thuộc tỉnh (provincial cities) or thị xã (towns). As of 22 April 2020, Vietnam had 707 "districts" including 77 provincial cities, 52 towns, 49 urban subdivisions, and 529 rural districts/counties (including 12 island districts/counties).

Vietnamese districts vary significantly in both population and area. Excluding the island districts, the most populous is Biên Hoà (provincial city) with 1,099,943 people; the least populous is the town of Mường Lay (12,125). Similarly, the largest district is Tương Dương (2,812.07 km^{2}) while the smallest is Cồn Cỏ with an area of only 2.3 km^{2}. Since 1 July 2025 Vietnam has removed the districts level. The government of Vietnam novated to setup only two levels: provinces level and communes level.

== See also ==
- Municipality
- Utility cooperative
