= Joshua Homer =

Canadian politician

Joshua Attwood Reynolds Homer (August 1, 1827 – September 20, 1886) was a Canadian Member of Parliament from British Columbia.

The son of Joseph Homer, he was born in Barrington, Nova Scotia and educated there, but later moved to the British Columbia Colony, settling in New Westminster in 1858, and becoming a merchant. In 1860, he married Sophie Wilson. In 1863, he was elected to the first Colonial Assembly of British Columbia. Homer was reelected in 1864. Homer eventually became High Sheriff for the colony. In that capacity, he declared the union with Vancouver Island on behalf of Governor Frederick Seymour in 1866.

Homer was a Liberal-Conservative candidate in New Westminster during the 1874 federal election but lost to Liberal James Cunningham. Homer was later elected Member of Parliament in an 1882 by-election when incumbent Thomas Robert McInnes resigned to accept an appointment in the Senate. His election was confirmed in the general election only six months later. Homer died in office in New Westminster before he could complete the term.

Parliament of Canada
| Preceded by Thomas Robert McInnes, Independent | Member of Parliament for New Westminster; 1882–1886 | Succeeded by Donald Chisholm, Conservative |
