= George Hahn (politician) =

Canadian politician

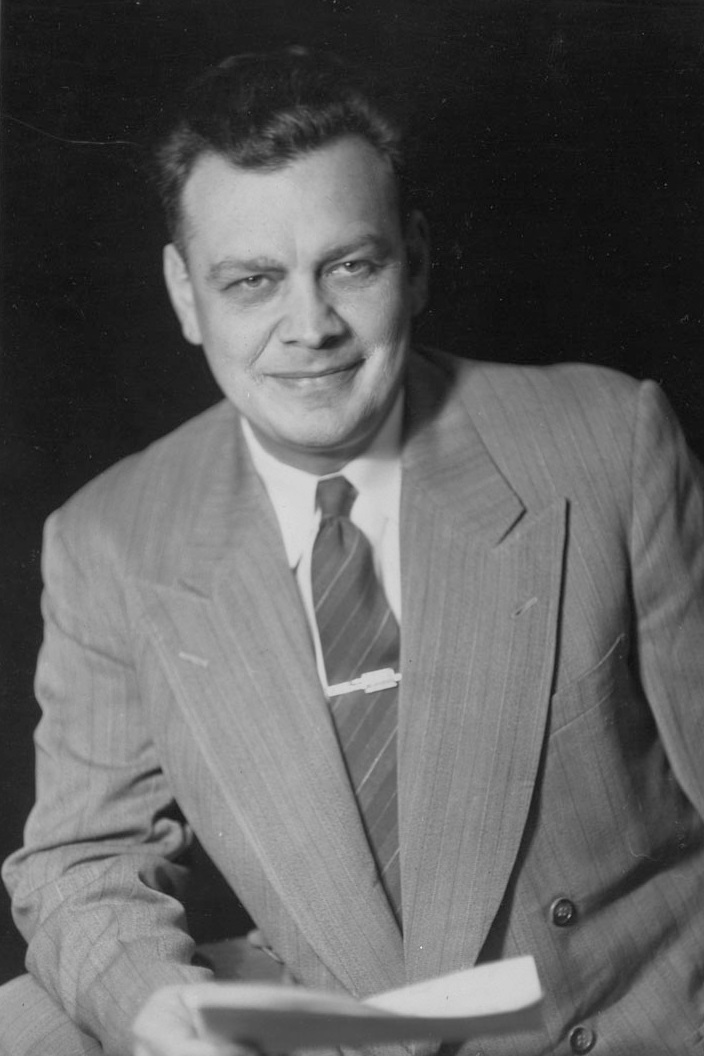

Member of Parliament for New Westminster
- In office August 10, 1953 – March 31, 1958
- Preceded by: William Malcolm Mott
- Succeeded by: William McLennan

21st Reeve of Surrey
- In office 1960–1961
- Preceded by: Robert Merton Nesbitt
- Succeeded by: Robert Merton Nesbitt

Personal details
- Born: Frederick George Hahn; 3 November 1911 Killaly, Saskatchewan
- Died: 5 February 1963 (aged 51) Penticton, British Columbia
- Party: Social Credit
- Profession: business executive, merchant, principal, teacher

Frederick George Jacob Hahn (3 November 1911 – 5 February 1963) was a Social Credit party member of the House of Commons of Canada. He was born in Killaly, Saskatchewan and became a business executive, merchant, principal and teacher by career.

He was first elected at the New Westminster riding in the 1953 general election. He was re-elected there for a second and final term in the 1957 election. In 1958, Hahn was defeated by William McLennan of the Progressive Conservative party.

Hahn became the reeve of Surrey, British Columbia in 1960. He was re-elected to a second term but resigned in the spring of 1961 to re-enter federal politics.

Hahn ran to succeed Solon Low at the 1961 Social Credit leadership convention but came in third. A few weeks prior to the convention, he unsuccessfully campaigned for another Parliament seat in a 29 May 1961 by-election at Esquimalt—Saanich. He placed fourth with 16% of the vote. He subsequently ran unsuccessfully in the 1962 election at Vancouver Centre.
