= William Garland McQuarrie =

Canadian politician

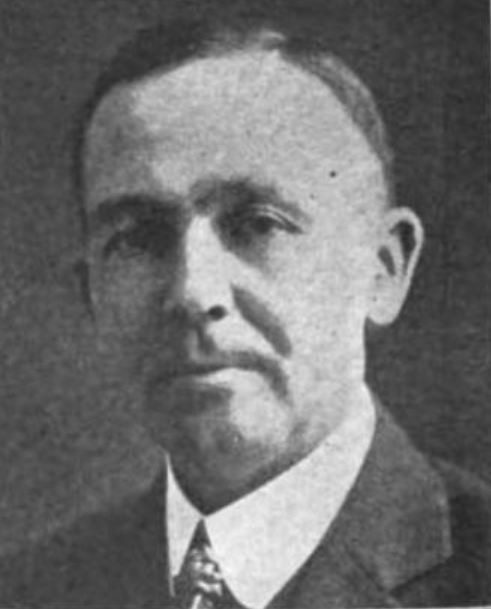

Member of the Canadian Parliament for New Westminster
- In office 1917–1930
- Preceded by: James Davis Taylor
- Succeeded by: Thomas Reid

Personal details
- Born: July 26, 1876 Ottawa, Ontario, Canada
- Died: May 30, 1943 (aged 66)
- Party: Conservative

William Garland McQuarrie (July 26, 1876 – May 30, 1943) was a Canadian lawyer and politician in the province of British Columbia.

Born in Ottawa, Ontario, the son of Lachlan and Mary McQuarrie, McQuarrie was raised in Winnipeg, Manitoba and New Westminster, British Columbia. He studied law at Osgoode Hall Law School in Toronto and was called to the Bar of British Columbia in 1900. In 1919, he was created a King's Counsel. He first practiced law in Ashcroft, British Columbia and soon practiced in New Westminster.

From 1916 to 1917, he was president of the New Westminster Federal Conservative Association. He was first elected to the House of Commons of Canada for the electoral district of New Westminster in the 1917 federal election. He was re-elected in 1921, 1925, and 1926 elections. He was defeated in 1930. McQuarrie was a staunch supporter of such old Conservative policies as Asian Exclusion and the protective tariff, and successfully faced down such strong Labour challengers as future Vancouver councillor R. P. Pettipiece (1921), legendary suffrage and co-operative advocate Rose Henderson (1925) and future Burnaby Reeve W. A. Pritchard (1926).
