= 1871 British Columbia federal by-elections =

Canadian elections

1871 Canadian federal by-elections in British Columbia
- November 24–December 19, 1871

All 6 British Columbian seats in the House of Commons (Note: Elections were held in 5 ridings, as 1 riding (Victoria District) was a dual-member district.)
- Turnout: 388 (Note: Valid ballots cast. No statistics available for rejected ballots.)
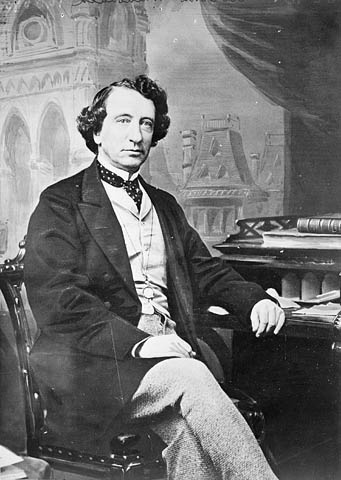
	First party	Second party
		LPC
Leader	John A. Macdonald	Vacant
Party	Conservative (Note: Including Liberal-Conservatives.)	Liberal
Seats before	0	0
Seats won	3	3
Popular vote	262	0 (Note: All successful Liberal candidates were acclaimed.)
Percentage	67.5	0.0
Prime Minister before election
John A. Macdonald
Conservative
Prime Minister after election
John A. Macdonald
Conservative

The 1871 Canadian federal by-elections in British Columbia occurred in November and December 1871 to elect British Columbia's first members of Parliament following the province's entry into Canada. Five electoral districts were established to elect six members to the Canadian House of Commons.

Unlike the 1871 British Columbia general election where non-partisan democracy was practiced, candidates in the federal by-elections campaigned as members of the two main Canadian political parties at the time, with the Conservative Party of Canada and Liberal Party of Canada winning three seats each.

== Results summary ==
Party	Votes	Vote %	Seats
Conservative	262	67.5%	3 / 6 (50%)
Liberal–Conservative	262	67.5%	3 / 6 (50%)
Liberal	0	0.0%	3 / 6 (50%)
Other	126	32.5%	0 / 6 (0%)
Total	388	100%	6 / 6 (100%)

== Results by riding ==
Electoral district	Candidates		
Electoral district	Conservative	Liberal	Other
Cariboo District	Joshua Spencer Thompson (Note: Campaigned and sat as a Liberal-Conservative.) acclaimed	–	–
New Westminster District	Hugh Nelson; 125 votes, 83.89%	–	Scott; 24 votes, 16.11%
Vancouver Island	Robert Wallace; 137 votes, 57.32%	–	John Jessop; 102 votes, 42.68%
Victoria District (2 seats)	–	Amor De Cosmos acclaimed	–
Victoria District (2 seats)	–	Henry Nathan Jr. acclaimed	–
Yale District	–	Charles Frederick Houghton acclaimed	–

== See also ==
- 1871 British Columbia general election
