= Aulay MacAulay Morrison =

Canadian politician

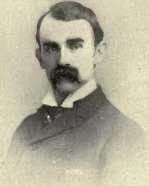

Member of the Canadian Parliament for New Westminster
- In office 1896–1904
- Preceded by: Gordon Edward Corbould
- Succeeded by: James Buckham Kennedy

Chief Justice of the Supreme Court of British Columbia
- In office 1929–1942

Personal details
- Born: June 15, 1863 Baddeck, Nova Scotia
- Died: February 27, 1942 (aged 78)
- Party: Liberal

Aulay MacAulay Morrison (June 15, 1863 – February 27, 1942) was a Canadian lawyer, judge and Liberal politician who represented New Westminster in the House of Commons of Canada from 1896 to 1904.

Born in Baddeck, Nova Scotia, the son of Christopher Morrison and Flora MacAulay, Morrison was educated in Common Schools, at the Academies of Sydney and Pictou and at Dalhousie University where he graduated with the degree of Bachelor of Law in 1888. He was called to the Bar of Nova Scotia in 1888 and the Bar of British Columbia in 1890 where he moved to practice law. In 1900, he married Elizabeth Livingston. Morrison was named puisne judge in the Superior Court of British Columbia. In 1929, he was named Chief Justice in the Supreme Court of British Columbia. He died while still a judge in Vancouver at the age of 78.
