= Hugh Nelson (Canadian politician) =

Canadian politician (1830–1893)

The Honourable Hugh Nelson
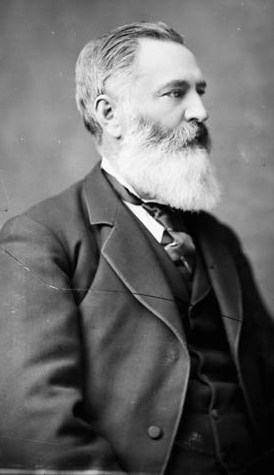

4th Lieutenant Governor of British Columbia
- In office 8 February 1887 – 1 November 1892
- Monarch: Victoria
- Governors General: The Marquess of Lansdowne; The Lord Stanley of Preston
- Premier: William Smithe; Alexander Edmund Batson Davie; John Robson; Theodore Davie
- Preceded by: Clement Francis Cornwall
- Succeeded by: Edgar Dewdney

Canadian Senator from British Columbia
- In office 12 December 1879 – March 1887
- Nominated by: John A. Macdonald

Member of Parliament for New Westminster New Westminster District (1871–1872)
- In office December 13, 1871 – January 22, 1874
- Preceded by: Electoral district created
- Succeeded by: James Cunningham

Member of the Legislative Council of British Columbia for New Westminster
- In office 1870–1871

Personal details
- Born: 25 May 1830 Larne, County Antrim, Ireland
- Died: 3 March 1893 (aged 62) London, England
- Party: Liberal-Conservative

Hugh Nelson (25 May 1830 – 3 March 1893) was a Canadian parliamentarian and the fourth Lieutenant Governor of British Columbia.

== Background ==
=== Early life ===
Born in his father's residence, Shore Cottage in Magheramorne, Larne, County Antrim, Ireland, the son of Robert Nelson, Esq. and Frances Quinn, he emigrated to California in 1854. He arrived in British Columbia in 1858, but unlike the horde of others who arrived in that year he had not come in pursuit of gold but to participate in the building of the colony as an English dominion. Eschewing the goldfields themselves, he founded the B.C. & Victoria Express Company, which had the dominant share of the freight and travel market between Victoria and New Westminster and Yale, with partner George Dietz, and also the lumbering firm Moody, Dietz and Nelson, the third partner of which was Sewell Moody, which was the operating name of Moodyville Sawmill Co. in what is now North Vancouver. The freighting firm was sold off early on to Frank Barnard Sr., whose B.C. Express Company then became the leading firm for shipments and travel to and from the Cariboo region

=== Political beginnings ===
Although active in politics, he did not stand for office to the Legislative Council until 1870 (for the colonial riding of New Westminster), by which time he had become one of the principal promoters of British Columbia's merger with the Confederation of Canada. He was a member of the Yale Convention, which ushered in BC's union with Canada, and was on the committee of that body charged with seeing the agreement come into effect. He was a member of the colonial Legislative Assembly of British Columbia, and in 1871 was one of the first Members of Parliament from British Columbia to the House of Commons, representing New Westminster District.

A Liberal-Conservative, he was re-elected in 1872. He did not run in 1874. In 1879, he was appointed to the Senate of Canada representing the senatorial division of Barkerville, British Columbia. He withdrew from business in 1882, and in February 1887, married Emily Stanton, daughter of J.B. Stanton, Esq., of the Canadian civil service. He and resigned his senate seat in 1887, when he was appointed Lieutenant-Governor of British Columbia. In 1892, he resigned as Lieutenant-Governor and returned to England where he died the following March of Bright's disease.

=== Family ===
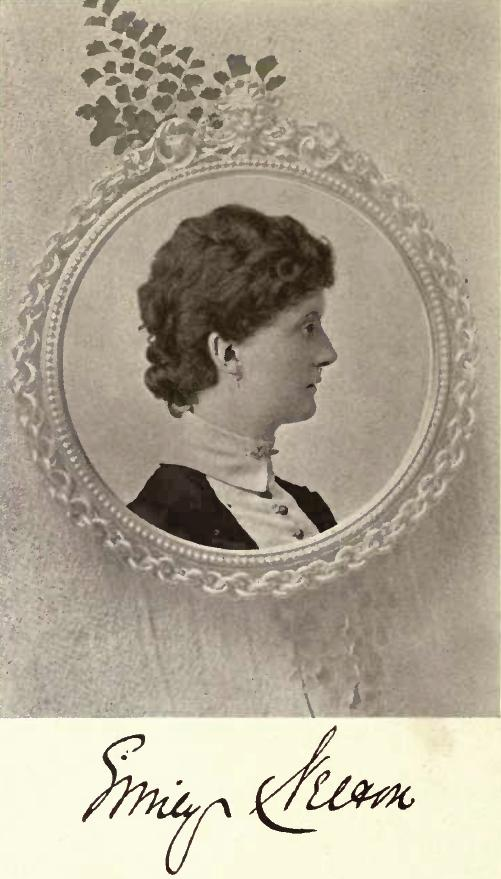
Mrs Emily Nelson by William James Topley

Hon Hugh Nelson, then a Senator married 17 September 1885 Emily Stanton, daughter of Isaac Brock Stanton and his wife, Maria Wilson. Emily was born and educated in Canada. The couple lived at 354 Cooper Street, Ottawa and Government House, Victoria during Hugh Nelson`s terms of office. He died in London, England on 3 March 1893.

== Electoral record ==
Canadian federal by-election, December 13, 1871: New Westminster District
Party	Candidate	Votes	%
Liberal–Conservative	Hugh Nelson	125	83.89
Unknown	? Scott	24	16.11
Total valid votes		149	100.0
Conservative pickup new district.			
This was a new riding created when British Columbia joined Confederation. Scott's first name is not given in the electoral record.

1872 Canadian federal election: New Westminster
Party	Candidate	Votes	%	±%
Liberal–Conservative	Hugh Nelson	acclaimed	–	–
Conservative hold		Swing		–
Source: Library of Parliament
