= James Buckham Kennedy =

Canadian lumberman and politician

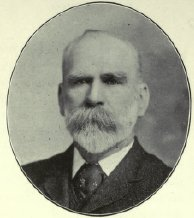

Member of the Canadian Parliament for New Westminster
- In office 1904–1908
- Preceded by: Aulay MacAulay Morrison
- Succeeded by: James Davis Taylor

Member of the Legislative Assembly of British Columbia for New Westminster City
- In office 1894–1898
- Preceded by: John Cunningham Brown
- Succeeded by: Alexander Henderson

Personal details
- Born: February 23, 1844 Bytown, Canada West
- Died: September 25, 1930 (aged 86)
- Party: Liberal

James Buckham Kennedy (February 23, 1844 – September 25, 1930) was a Canadian lumberman and Liberal politician. Kennedy was the MLA for New Westminster from 1894 to 1898 and Member of Parliament for New Westminster for one term from 1904 to 1908. He also sat on New Westminster's city council.

Kennedy was married first in New Westminster B.C. on November 30, 1880, to Josephine Eugenia DeBeck who was born in 1859 in New Brunswick, and died in Los Gatos, California in 1883. She was the daughter of George and Eliza Ann DeBeck. They had one son Clarence George Kennedy born May 6, 1882, in New Westminster B.C., who died March 27, 1908, in Vernon, BC. All, except Josephine, are buried in the Fraser Cemetery New Westminster B.C.
