= 1869 Colony of British Columbia general election =

British colonial election in North America

The Legislative Council of British Columbia held its second election in 1869. BC was a colony formed by the union of the colony of Vancouver Island and the colony of British Columbia.

Members elected:

- William Weir Carrall, Cariboo
- John C. Davie, Victoria District
- Montague William Tyrwhitt Drake, Victoria City
- Henry Havelock, Yale
- John Sebastian Helmcken, Victoria City
- Thomas Basil Humphreys, Lillooet
- David Babington Ring, Nanaimo
- John Robson, New Westminster

The governor appointed 13 more members to the legislative council.

== See also ==
- History of British Columbia#Colonial British Columbia (1858–1871)
