= Thomas Reid (Canadian politician) =

Canadian politician (1886–1968)

The Honourable Thomas Reid

Member of Parliament for New Westminster
- In office 1930–1949
- Preceded by: William Garland McQuarrie
- Succeeded by: William Malcolm Mott

Canadian Senator from British Columbia
- In office 1949–1967
- Appointed by: Louis St. Laurent

Personal details
- Born: 18 April 1886 Cambuslang, Scotland
- Died: 12 October 1968 (aged 82)
- Party: Liberal
- Spouse: Mary Jeanie Masson
- Portfolio: Parliamentary Assistant to the Minister of Fisheries (1948); Parliamentary Assistant to the Minister of National Revenue (1948–1949); Parliamentary Assistant to the Minister of National Health and Welfare (1949)

Thomas Reid (18 April 1886 – 12 October 1968) was a Canadian businessman and politician in the province of British Columbia.

== Early life and career ==
Reid was born in Cambuslang, Scotland. In 1909, he moved to Canada and in 1911, married Mary Jeanie Masson, also from Scotland. Together they raised a family of two sons and two daughters. The Reids moved to Surrey in 1918 where Thomas Reid managed the Pacific Car and Foundry Company.

In 1922 Reid was elected to office as a Councillor for Surrey and served two years in this capacity. From 1924 to 1930 he was elected annually to the position of Reeve. During this time he was twice appointed head of the Union of British Columbia Municipalities. In 1930, Reid entered federal politics and was elected Liberal Member of Parliament (MP) for the New Westminster riding. He represented this riding for nineteen years. Reid was a founding member of the International Pacific Coast Sockeye Salmon Commission and served as chairman from 1937 to 1967.

Reid was a vocal advocate for cultural genocide, arguing while a Liberal MP for the complete removal Canadians of Japanese ancestry from the province of BC and from Canada altogether. His actions supported the mass clearance of over 20,000 British Columbians in 1942.

Take them back to Japan. They do not belong here, and here, and there is only one solution to the problem. They cannot be assimilated as Canadians for no matter how long the Japanese remain in Canada they will always be Japanese.

— Thomas Reid, MP, January 15, 1942

He became Parliamentary Assistant to the Ministers of Fisheries and of National Revenue in 1948 and in 1949 assisted the Minister of National Health and Welfare. In 1948 he was summoned to the Senate.

Senator Reid Elementary School in Surrey, BC is named in his honour.

== Election record ==
1945 Canadian federal election: New Westminster
Party	Candidate	Votes	%	±%
Liberal	Thomas Reid	14,158	33.80	−10.52
Co-operative Commonwealth	Albert Thomas Alsbury	12,229	29.20	+0.68
Progressive Conservative	George Oswald Twiss	11,133	26.58	−0.59
Liberal–Progressive	Harold John Griffin	2,640	6.30	–
Social Credit	George Anderson Pollock	1,403	3.35	–
Democratic	Spencer Herbert Broatch	315	0.75	–
Total valid votes		41,878	100.00	
Liberal hold		Swing		−5.60
