= Gordon Edward Corbould =

Canadian politician

Gordon Edward Corbould, KC (November 2, 1847 – August 19, 1926) was a Canadian lawyer and Conservative politician. In an 1890 by-election triggered by the death of the incumbent MP Donald Chisholm, he was chosen to represent New Westminster in the House of Commons of Canada. He was re-elected once, and sat in the house until 1896.

Born in Toronto, Ontario, the son of Charles and Mary Corbould, Corbould was educated at the Upper Canada College. He was admitted to practice in Ontario in 1872 and practice law in Orillia, Ontario. He moved to New Westminster, British Columbia in 1880 and was called to the bar of British Columbia in 1882. Corbould served as Treasurer (chief elected officer) of the Law Society of British Columbia from 1912 to 1920.

Parliament of Canada
Preceded by Donald Chisholm	Member of Parliament for New Westminster; 1890–1896	Succeeded by Aulay MacAulay Morrison
