= James Davis Taylor =

Canadian politician (1863–1941)

The Honourable James Davis Taylor

Member of Parliament for New Westminster
- In office 1908–1917
- Preceded by: James Buckham Kennedy
- Succeeded by: William Garland McQuarrie

Canadian Senator from British Columbia
- In office 1917–1941
- Appointed by: Robert Borden

Personal details
- Born: September 2, 1863 Abenaqui Mills, Canada East
- Died: May 11, 1941 (aged 77)
- Party: Conservative

James Davis Taylor (September 2, 1863 – May 11, 1941) was a Canadian publisher, journalist, soldier and Conservative politician. As a member of the Ottawa Sharpshooters, Taylor was involved in resisting the 1885 North-West Rebellion. As a lieutenant colonel during World War I he commanded the 131st Battalion overseas.

== Background ==
Taylor was MP for New Westminster from 1908 until 1917. Davis was then appointed to the Senate where he served until his death.
