= Donald Chisholm (politician) =

Canadian politician

Donald Chisholm Donald Chisholm
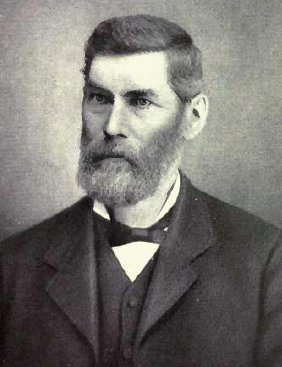

Member of the Canadian Parliament for New Westminster
- In office 1887–1890
- Preceded by: Joshua Homer
- Succeeded by: Gordon Edward Corbould

Personal details
- Born: 1822 Antigonish, Nova Scotia
- Died: April 5, 1890 (aged 67–68)
- Party: Conservative

Donald Chisholm (1822 – April 5, 1890), also known as "Doc" Chisholm, was a Canadian Member of Parliament from British Columbia, representing the riding of New Westminster.

Chisholm was born in valley of the Lower South River near Antigonish, Nova Scotia, of parents who had migrated there from Inverness-shire, Scotland. He was educated there and became a teacher, but in 1849 he started out for the California Gold Rush with 23 other prospectors. In California, he took part in the evolution of that state's mining laws, but had little success in the goldfields but also practiced medicine, and is credited with rescuing the lives of many miners (his medical skills were later of use during a cholera epidemic in British Columbia). Staying in California only a few years, he returned to Canada and became involved in the wheat trade in Ontario. Speculating on wheat prices during the Crimean War, Chisholm was left holding thousands of bushels at the time of the declaration of a peace. He would have made a small fortune had the peace come only a few more weeks later.

In the wake of this experience, he migrated to British Columbia in 1858 and became involved in many different businesses, settling in Hope, British Columbia. Possessed of "herculean strength" and standing 6 feet 4 inches (193 cm) tall, and reputedly the strongest man in the Colony, he was appointed a constable during the McGowan's War and in 1860 he was elected by the people of Hope to a convention in New Westminster, the purpose of which was to frame and present an appeal to the Imperial Government to introduce proper government for the Mainland Colony, which was then still ruled near-entirely by Governor James Douglas (a Legislative Assembly for the Colony would not be created until 1864, after Douglas' retirement).

Chisholm was among the first parties to travel to the Big Bend Gold Rush in 1860, nearly losing his life when a snow bridge gave way as he was crossing McCullough Creek and he was swept away, then rescued, unconscious, by a party of miners half a mile downstream. In 1862 he went to the Cariboo Gold Rush and spent a few years there before moving to the Kootenay district to engage in both lumbering and mining, serving for a time as foreman for the Cherry Creek silver mine. During this period Chisholm was engaged to lead the partyof Major-General Selby Smyth, militia commander of Canada, and his staff through the mountains from Alberta to Hope.

In 1874 he moved to New Westminster and became wealthy through investing in the wholesale and retail liquor business and also a flour and feed business of a Mr. Fred Woodcock, and was President of the New Westminster Board of Trade for several years. He also launched a hotel and store at Ladner (then Ladner's Landing), later owned by Thomas NcNeely, and was also a partner in the Delta Canning Company, one of the large canneries then a mainstay of economic life in the province. Other property holdings included land in what is now the Grandview area of Vancouver, and at Hastings (New Brighton), as well as holdings in the centre of the City of New Westminster and also, in partnership with a Mr. Daniel Mills was co-owner of a large farm on Saltspring Island.

Chisholm was first elected to office in the 1887 general election, representing the New Westminster riding as a Liberal-Conservative supporting Sir John A. Macdonald, and died in office on April 5, 1890.
