= William Mott (British Columbia politician) =

Canadian politician

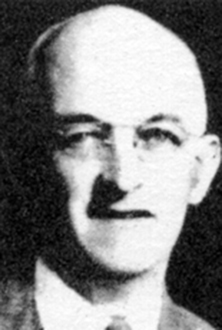

Member of Parliament for New Westminster
- In office October 24, 1949 – August August 10, 1953
- Preceded by: Thomas Reid
- Succeeded by: George Hahn

27th Mayor of New Westminster
- In office 1942–1948
- Preceded by: Frederick Hume
- Succeeded by: James Lewis Sangster

Personal details
- Born: William Malcolm Mott; 18 December 1894 Dartmouth, Nova Scotia, Canada
- Died: 26 November 1961 (aged 66)
- Party: Liberal
- Profession: electrician

William Malcolm Mott (18 December 1894 – 26 November 1961) was a Liberal party member of the House of Commons of Canada. He was born in Dartmouth, Nova Scotia and became an electrician by career and president of Mott Electric Company.

He was first elected to Parliament at the New Westminster riding in a by-election on 24 October 1949, after incumbent Thomas Reid was appointed to the Senate. Mott was defeated in the 1953 election by George Hahn of the Social Credit party.

Mott was also mayor of New Westminster, British Columbia from 1942 to 1948, after serving as alderman there between 1936 and 1940. In 1947 and 1948, he was president of the Union of British Columbia Municipalities. Mott Crescent in the municipality's Victory Heights sector was named in his honour.
