= 1866 Colony of British Columbia general election =

British colonial election in North America

The Legislative Council of British Columbia held its first election in 1866. BC was a colony formed by the union of the colony of Vancouver Island and the colony of British Columbia.

Nine members were elected:
Amor De Cosmos - Victoria
John Sebastian Helmcken Victoria
Joseph Despard Pemberton Victoria District
John Robson New Westminster
Robert Thompson Smith Columbia River and Kootenay
Joseph L. Southgate Nanaimo
Edward Stamp Lillooet
George Anthony Walkem Cariboo
Francis Jones Barnard Yale and Lytton

The Governor also appointed 14 members to the Legislative Council.
