= Douglas Hogarth =

Canadian politician

Honorable Justice Douglas Aird Hogarth
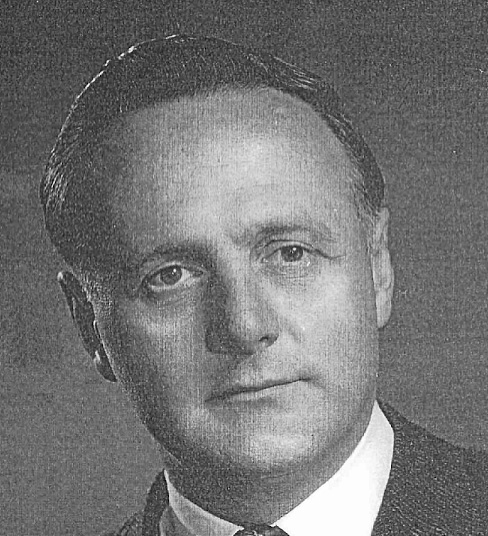

Member of Parliament for New Westminster
- In office June 1968 – September 1972

Personal details
- Born: 9 May 1927 Saskatoon, Saskatchewan
- Died: 17 September 1996 (aged 69)
- Party: Liberal
- Spouse: Solveig Olea
- Profession: barrister and solicitor

Hon. Douglas Aird Hogarth, QC (9 May 1927 – 17 September 1996) was a Liberal party member of the House of Commons of Canada. He was born in Saskatoon, Saskatchewan and became a barrister and solicitor by career.

He was first elected at the New Westminster riding in the 1968 general election and served one term, the 28th Canadian Parliament. Leaving office, Hogarth did not participate in further federal elections.
