= New Westminster District =

British Columbia electoral district

Defunct federal electoral district
- Legislature: House of Commons
- District created: 1871
- District abolished: 1872
- First contested: 1871
- Last contested: 1871

New Westminster District was a Canadian federal electoral district created when the province of British Columbia joined Confederation in 1871. Like other ridings established in that year, a byelection was called to fill the seat until the general election of 1872. The riding constituted all of the New Westminster Land District as well as the whole of the mainland Coast and adjoining islands, all the way to the Yukon border excepting the Coast and the Alaska Panhandle.

The 1871 names were all temporary pending ratification of the riding system by the provincial legislature. When they became mandated the riding names were simplified, New Westminster District's becoming simply New Westminster, and the same pattern was followed by the other temporary names, Victoria District, Cariboo Distridct, and Yale District, which became the ridings of Victoria, Cariboo, and Yale for the general election the following year. Riding of Vancouver Island became the riding of Vancouver.

Note the historical British Columbia provincial riding, Westminster, which appeared in the 1890 provincial election only.

== Members of Parliament ==
Parliament	Years	Member	Party
1st	1871–1872	Hugh Nelson	Liberal–Conservative
Riding dissolved into New Westminster

== Election results ==
Canadian federal by-election, December 13, 1871
Party	Candidate	Votes	%
Liberal–Conservative	Hugh Nelson	125	83.89
Unknown	? Scott	24	16.11
Total valid votes		149	100.0
Conservative pickup new district.			
This was a new riding created when British Columbia joined Confederation. Scott's first name is not given in the electoral record.

By the 1872 election the riding boundaries had been properly legislated and renamed. New Westminster District became the riding of New Westminster.
