= Colony of British Columbia (1866–1871) =

British possession in North America, 1866–1871

- 1866–1871
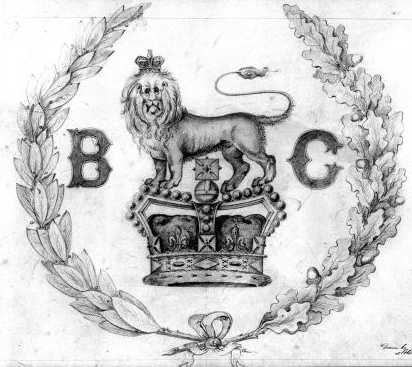
- Flag Coat of arms
- Anthem: God Save the Queen
- The modern Canadian province of British Columbia has the same boundaries as its colonial predecessor.
- Status: British colony
- Capital: Victoria
- Common languages: English (official); Northern Athabaskan languages; Salishan languages
- Religion: Christianity, Indigenous beliefs
- Government: Constitutional monarchy
- Monarch
  - 1866-1871: Victoria
- Governor
  - 1866-1869: Frederick Seymour
  - 1869-1871: Anthony Musgrave
- Historical era: British era
  - Established, by merger with Colony of Vancouver Island: 19 November 1866
  - Entered Canadian Confederation: 20 July 1871
- Currency: British Columbia dollar
Preceded by
Colony of Vancouver Island
Colony of British Columbia (1858-1866)
Russian America
Succeeded by
Province of British Columbia

The Colony of British Columbia was a British Crown Colony that resulted from the 1866 merger of two British colonies, the Colony of Vancouver Island and the mainland Colony of British Columbia. The united colony existed until its incorporation into Canadian Confederation in 1871 as the Province of British Columbia.

== Background ==
The Colony of Vancouver Island was created in 1849 to bolster British claims to the whole island and the adjacent Gulf Islands, and to provide a North Pacific home port for the Royal Navy at Esquimalt. By the mid-1850s, the Island Colony's non-indigenous population was around 800 people; a mix of mostly British, French-Canadian, Hawaiians, but with handfuls of Iroquoians, Métis and Cree in the employ of the fur company, and a few Belgian and French Oblate priests. First Nations populations had not recovered from smallpox epidemics in the 1770s and 1780s. Three years earlier, the Oregon Treaty had established the boundary between British North America and the United States west of the Rocky Mountains along the 49th parallel. The mainland area of present-day British Columbia was an unorganized territory under British sovereignty until 1858. The region was under the administration of the Hudson's Bay Company, and its regional chief executive, James Douglas, who was also the Governor of Vancouver Island. The region was informally given the name New Caledonia, after the fur-trading district which covered the central and northern interior of the mainland west of the Rockies.

All this changed with the Fraser Canyon Gold Rush of 1857–1858, when the non-aboriginal population of the mainland swelled from about 150 Hudson's Bay Company employees and their families to about 20,000 prospectors, speculators, land agents, and merchants. The British Colonial Office acted swiftly, proclaiming the Crown Colony of British Columbia (1858–1866) on 2 August 1858, and dispatching Richard Clement Moody and the Royal Engineers, Columbia Detachment, to establish British order and to transform the newly established Colony into the British Empire's "bulwark in the farthest west" and "found a second England on the shores of the Pacific". Moody was appointed Chief Commissioner of Lands and Works and Lieutenant-Governor of British Columbia. Although the Vancouver Island colony had signed treaties with the aboriginal population, the new colony absorbed the traditional territories without treaties.

== United colonies ==
Moody and the Columbia Detachment disbanded in July 1863, and Moody returned to England. Douglas continued to administer the mainland colony in absentia from Victoria, but Sir Arthur Kennedy was appointed to succeed him as Governor of Vancouver Island. New Westminster would welcome its first resident governor, Frederick Seymour, in 1864. Both colonies were labouring under huge debts, largely accumulated by the completion of extensive infrastructure to service the huge population influx. As gold revenues dropped, the loans secured to pay for these projects undermined the economies of the colonies, and pressure grew in London for their amalgamation. Despite a great deal of ambivalence in some quarters, on 6 August 1866, the united colony was proclaimed, with the capital and assembly in Victoria, and Seymour was designated governor.

Seymour continued as governor of the united colonies until 1869, but after the British North America Act, 1867 joined the three colonies (New Brunswick, Nova Scotia, and the Province of Canada) into the new single country of Canada in 1867, it seemed increasingly only a matter of time before Vancouver Island and British Columbia would negotiate terms of union. Major players in the Confederation League such as Amor De Cosmos, Robert Beaven, and John Robson pushed for union primarily as a way of advancing both the economic health of the region, as well as increased democratic reform through truly representative and responsible government. In this effort, they were supported and aided by Canadian officials, especially Sir Samuel Tilley, a Father of Confederation and Minister of Customs in the government of Prime Minister Sir John A. Macdonald. Seymour, ill and beset by protests that he was dragging in his feet in completing negotiations for the HBC's territory, was facing the end of his term, and Macdonald was pressing London to replace him with Sir Anthony Musgrave, outgoing governor of the Colony of Newfoundland. Before the appointment could be finalized, however, Seymour died.

With Musgrave's appointment, the British colonial secretary, Lord Granville, pushed Musgrave to accelerate negotiations with Canada towards union. It took almost two years for those negotiations, in which Canada eventually agreed to shoulder the colonies' massive debt and join the territory to a transcontinental railway, to be finalized. His efforts led to the admission of British Columbia as the sixth province of Canada on 20 July 1871.

== Governors of the united Colony of British Columbia ==
- Frederick Seymour, 1866–1869
- Sir Anthony Musgrave, 1869–1871

== Legislative Council of the united Colony of British Columbia ==
From 1866 to 1869, fourteen members were appointed by the governor and nine were elected by the public.

From 1869 to 1872, thirteen members were appointed by the Governor, eight were elected by the public.

=== Elections to the Legislative Council ===
- 1866 Colony of British Columbia general election
- 1869 Colony of British Columbia general election

== Supreme Court ==
In 1869 Supreme Courts were established on the mainland ("The Supreme Court of the Mainland of British Columbia") and on Vancouver Island ("Supreme Court of Vancouver Island"), which merged in 1870 as the Supreme Court of British Columbia.

In 1858 the British Government had sent over Matthew Baillie Begbie as Chief Justice for the colony. Although trained at Lincoln's Inn he had never practised law, but soon published a Rules of Court and a timetable of sittings. He held the post, under consecutive administrative regimes, until his death in 1894.

== See also ==
- Former colonies and territories in Canada
- Territorial evolution of Canada after 1867
- Alaska boundary dispute
