= William McLennan (politician) =

Canadian politician (1903–1980)

William Alexander McLennan

Member of Parliament for New Westminster
- In office March 1958 – June 1962

Personal details
- Born: 10 April 1903 Paisley, Ontario, Canada
- Died: 28 December 1980 (aged 77)
- Party: Progressive Conservative
- Spouse: Margaret Lee Wilson (m. 14 Nov 1934)
- Profession: Lumber merchant

William Alexander McLennan (10 April 1903 – 28 December 1980) was a Progressive Conservative party member of the House of Commons of Canada. Born in Paisley, Ontario, he was a lumber merchant by career.

He was first elected at the New Westminster riding in the 1958 general election. He served one term, the 24th Canadian Parliament, until his defeat at New Westminster in the 1962 federal election. He was defeated again on another attempt in the 1963 election.
