= Richard Charles Lowndes =

British military officer and freemason

Major Richard Charles Lowndes MC
- Born: 11 July 1888
- Died: 1960 (aged 71–72)
- Alma mater: Malvern College
- Relatives: Colonel Thomas Moody, CRE WI, ADC, Kt. (maternal great-grandfather); Major-General Richard Clement Moody (maternal grandfather); Mary Susannah Hawks (maternal grandmother); Colonel Richard Stanley Hawks Moody CB (b. 1854) (maternal uncle); Captain Henry de Clervaux Moody (b. 1864) (maternal uncle); Major George Robert Boyd Moody (b. 1868) (maternal uncle).
- Military career
- Allegiance: United Kingdom
- Branch: Royal Artillery
- Rank: Major
- Conflicts: Siege of Kut
- Awards: Military Cross

Major Richard Charles Lowndes MC (1888 – 1960) was a British Royal Artillery officer and influential British freemason.

== Family ==
Richard Charles Lowndes (11 July 1888 – 1960) was the elder son of The Rev. William Dobson Lowndes, of Christ's College, Cambridge, of Little Comberton Rectory, Pershore, Worcestershire, and Pershore District Councillor Margaret Moody JP (1863–1943), who was a daughter of Major-General Richard Clement Moody (who was the founder of British Columbia) and of Mary Susannah Hawks of the Hawks industrialist dynasty.

His maternal uncles included Colonel Richard Stanley Hawks Moody CB (b. 1854); Captain Henry de Clervaux Moody (b. 1864); and Major George Robert Boyd Moody (b. 1868). His maternal great-grandparents were Colonel Thomas Moody, CRE WI, ADC, Kt. and Martha Clement (1784 – 1868).

The Rectorship of Little Comberton, Pershore, Worcestershire, had been held by his paternal line continuously for 113 years. His father had been Rector for 43 years, and his paternal grandfather The Rev. Edward Spencer Lowndes also had been Rector. His paternal grandmother was the daughter of The Rev. William Parker, of Trinity College, Oxford, who also had been Rector. He was related to the judge Sir George Rivers Lowndes.

=== Siblings ===
Richard Charles Lowndes had one brother who was The Rev. William Parker Lowndes, of St. Pancras Church, Ipswich, also of the Royal Artillery, who died during 1929 after a fall from his horse exacerbated wounds that he had received in World War I. He had two sisters: Mary de Clervaux, who married Alan Edgar Lester, of Birmingham and Harborne, and who drowned in 1950; and Margaret Alice, who was a missionary at Zanzibar with the Universities' Mission to South Africa.

Malvern College

=== Marriage and issue ===
He married Phyllis Daphne Vernon Cooke (1897 – 1995) in 1920. They had at least one son, Andrew Lowndes (1921 - 2003).

He is buried, with his mother and wife and son, at St. Peter's, Little Comberton, Worcestershire.

== Vocation ==
He was educated at Malvern College.

He served in the Royal Artillery, into which he was commissioned in 1909, including in India, and was captured and imprisoned by the Turkish after the Siege of Kut in World War I.

After he had retired from the British Army, he worked as a shipping merchant at Killick Nixon, Bombay, India, before he returned to live at Wardens Close, Boar's Hill, Oxford.

== Freemasonry ==
Lowndes was a member of at least six freemasonic lodges. He was a Royal Arch freemason of Ubique Chapter No. 1789, of which he served as First Principal, and a founder of Old Malvernian Lodge No. 4363. He was initiated into Mount Everest Lodge No. 2439 in Darjeeling, India, which is now known as Mount Everest Lebong Lodge No. 52. He was also a member of Felix Lodge No. 355 of the Scottish Constitution, and a member of the Correspondence Circle of Quatuor Coronati Lodge No. 2076, and a Celebrant of Societas Rosicruciana in Anglia.

== Ancestry ==
Ancestors of Richard Charles Lowndes

4. The Rev. Edward Spencer Lowndes
2. The Rev. William Dobson Lowndes
10. The Rev. William Parker
1. Major Richard Charles Lowndes MC
24. Thomas Moody (1732, Arthuret – 1796) (who had fought for the Jacobites at the Battle of Culloden when he was aged only 13 years)
12. Colonel Thomas Moody ADC, CRE WI, Kt. (uncle of Clement Moody (clergyman))
25. Barbara Blamire (1740 – 1806)
6. Major-General Richard Clement Moody Kt.
26. Richard Clement (1754–1829)
13. Martha Clement (1784 – 1868) (sister-in-law of Philippa Cobham Alleyne and aunt of Richard Clement (cricketer) and Reynold Clement)
27. Susannah Dougan (first wife of Richard Clement)
3. Margaret Moody JP
28. George Hawks of Blackheath (1766 - 1820) (brother of Sir Robert Shafto Hawks)
14. Joseph Stanley Hawks, JP DL, Sheriff of Newcastle
29.
7. Mary Susannah Hawks
30. William Boyd Junior (1773 - 1855) (father of Edward Fenwick Boyd)
15. Mary Elizabeth Boyd (aunt of The Ven. Charles Twining Boyd)
31. Esther Locke (1777 - 1818)
