= Richard Stanley Hawks Moody =

British Army officer and military historian (1854–1930)

Colonel Richard Stanley Hawks Moody CB
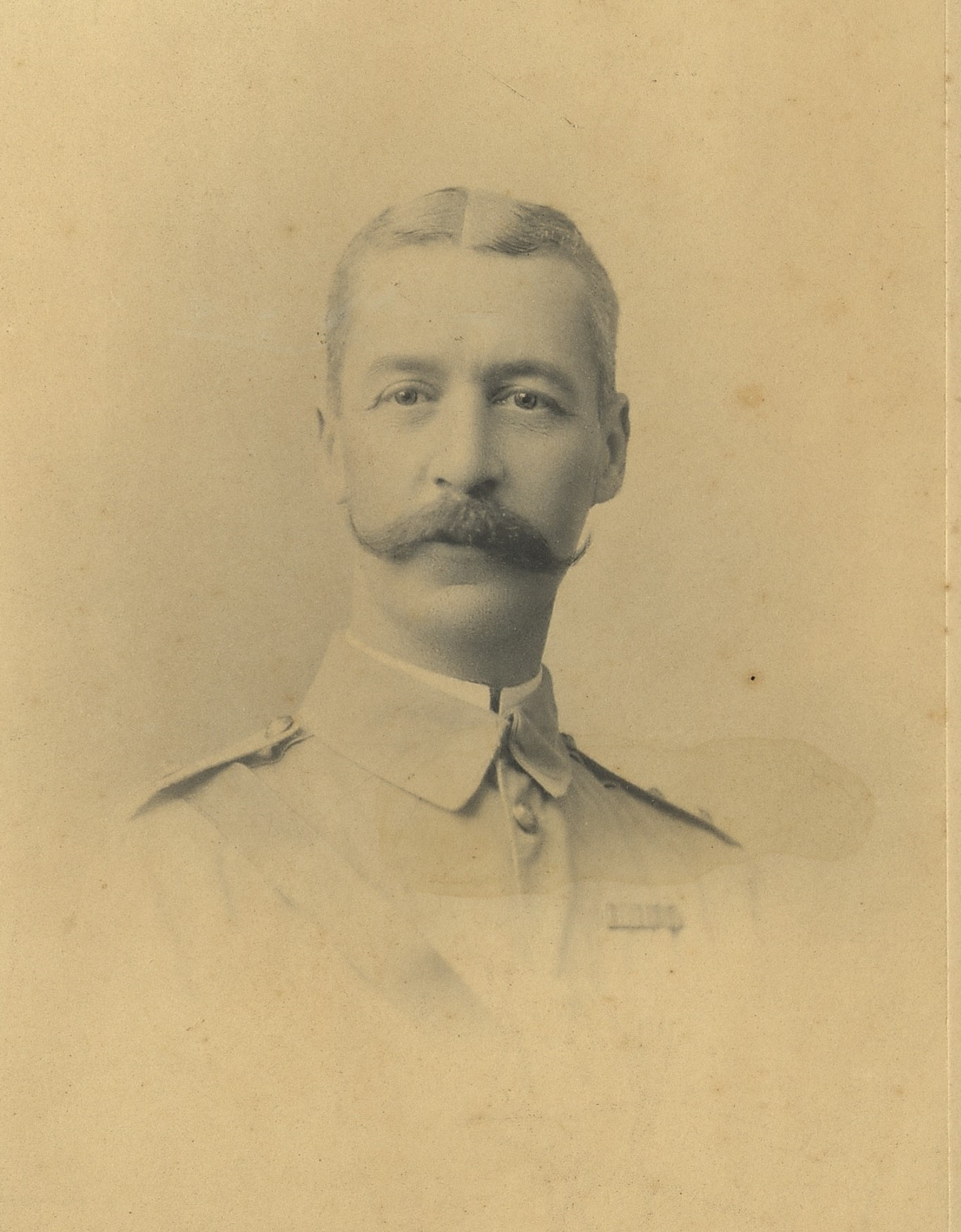
- R. S. H. Moody circa 1885
- Born: 23 October 1854; Strada Reale, Valletta, Malta
- Died: 10 March 1930 (aged 75); Windsor Castle, Berkshire
- Alma mater: Ludlow College; Cheltenham College; Staff College, Camberley
- Spouse(s): Mary Latimer R. R. C. (d. 1936), niece of Nichol Latimer. Married 1881.
- Relatives: Colonel Thomas Moody ADC Kt. (paternal grandfather); Joseph Stanley Hawks JP DL, Sheriff of Newcastle (maternal grandfather); Major-General Richard Clement Moody, Kt. (father); Colonel Hampden Clement Blamire Moody CB (uncle); Major Richard Charles Lowndes MC (nephew); Major-General James Fitzgerald Martin KStJ (son-in-law); James W. Webb-Jones (son-in-law)
- Military career
- Allegiance: United Kingdom
- Branch: British Army
- Rank: Colonel
- Commands: 7th battalion Royal Irish Fusiliers; 2nd battalion Royal Irish Fusiliers; Royal Pioneer Corps (Labour Corps); Buffs (Royal East Kent Regiment) (honorary)
- Conflicts: Anglo-Zulu War; Chitral Expedition; Second Boer War; World War I
- Awards: Companion of the Order of the Bath; Military Knight of Windsor

Colonel Richard Stanley Hawks Moody CB (23 October 1854 – 10 March 1930) was a distinguished British Army officer, military historian, and Military Knight of Windsor.

He was the eldest son of Major-General Richard Clement Moody, Kt. (who was the founder of British Columbia) and of Mary Susannah Hawks of the Hawks industrialist dynasty.

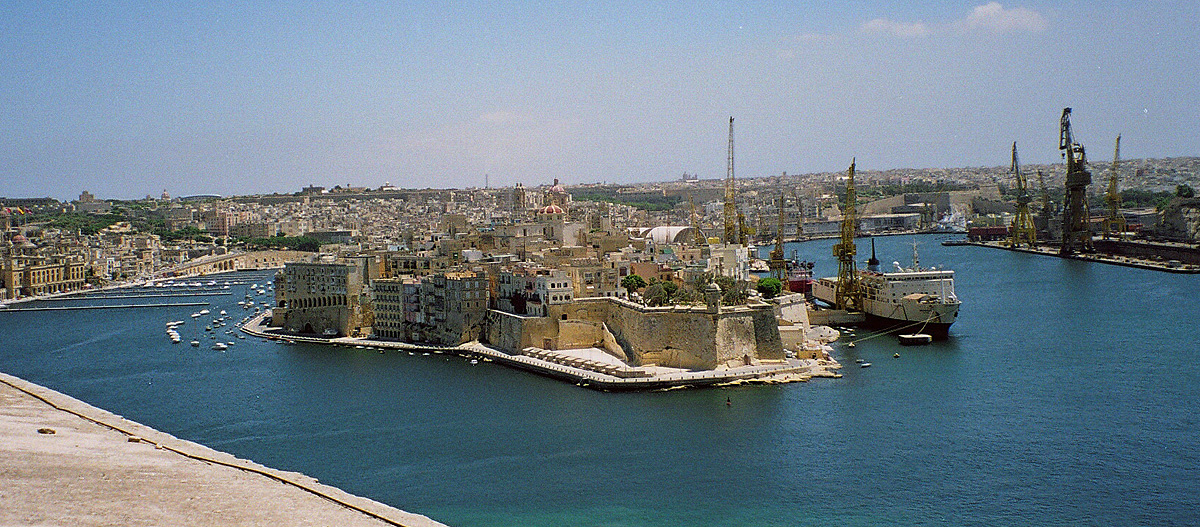
Moody was born in Valletta, Malta

== Birth and family ==
Moody was born in Strada Reale, Valletta, Malta, on 23 October 1854, into a high church landed gentry family of senior officers in the Royal Engineers. He was born whilst his father was Commanding Executive Officer of the Royal Engineers in Malta. He was the eldest son of Major-General Richard Clement Moody, Kt. (who was the founder of British Columbia) and of Mary Susannah Hawks of the Hawks industrialist dynasty.

His maternal grandparents were the merchant banker Joseph Stanley Hawks JP DL, Sheriff of Newcastle, (1791 - 1873), and Mary Boyd (d. 1884) of the armigerous Boyd merchant banking family of Newcastle.

Moody's paternal grandparents were the Colonial Office aide-de-camp Colonel Thomas Moody, ADC, CRE WI, Kt., and Martha Clement (1784 – 1868). Moody's uncles included The Rev. James Leith Moody (1816 -1896) (who was Chaplain to Royal Navy in China, and to the British Army in the Falkland Islands, and Gibraltar, and Malta, and Crimea); Colonel Hampden Clement Blamire Moody CB (1821 - 1869) (who was Commander of the Royal Engineers in China during the Second Opium War and the Taiping Rebellion); and the sugar-manufacture expert Shute Barrington Moody through whom his nephew was the artist Commander Thomas Barrington Moody (b. 1848) of the Royal Navy.

Moody was a second-cousin of the high church clergyman, theologian, classical scholar, and freemason, Clement Moody, Vicar of Newcastle. Moody's nephew was freemason Major Richard Charles Lowndes MC.

== Early life ==
Moody spent his infancy in British Columbia, of which his father was founder and first Lieutenant-Governor, and is mentioned in the letters that were written from there by his mother, Mary Susannah Hawks, to her sisters Juliana Stanley Hawks and Emily Stanley Hawks in England.

He was educated in England at Ludlow Grammar School and at Cheltenham College. He was commissioned, as a sub-lieutenant, in the 3rd Regiment of Foot, on 9 August 1873. He subsequently passed the Staff College, Camberley.

== Military service ==
=== Anglo-Zulu War ===
Moody served in the Anglo-Zulu War, in 1879, as an adjutant, in Zululand, with the 2nd battalion of the 3rd Regiment of Foot, for which he received the medal with clasp.

=== Malta ===
Moody was brigade major at Malta between 1885 and 1890. His father Major-General Richard Clement Moody, Kt. died on 31 March 1887 and left over £24,000 in money (about £1.6 million in 21st-century money) in addition to estates which included over 3049 acres in British Columbia.

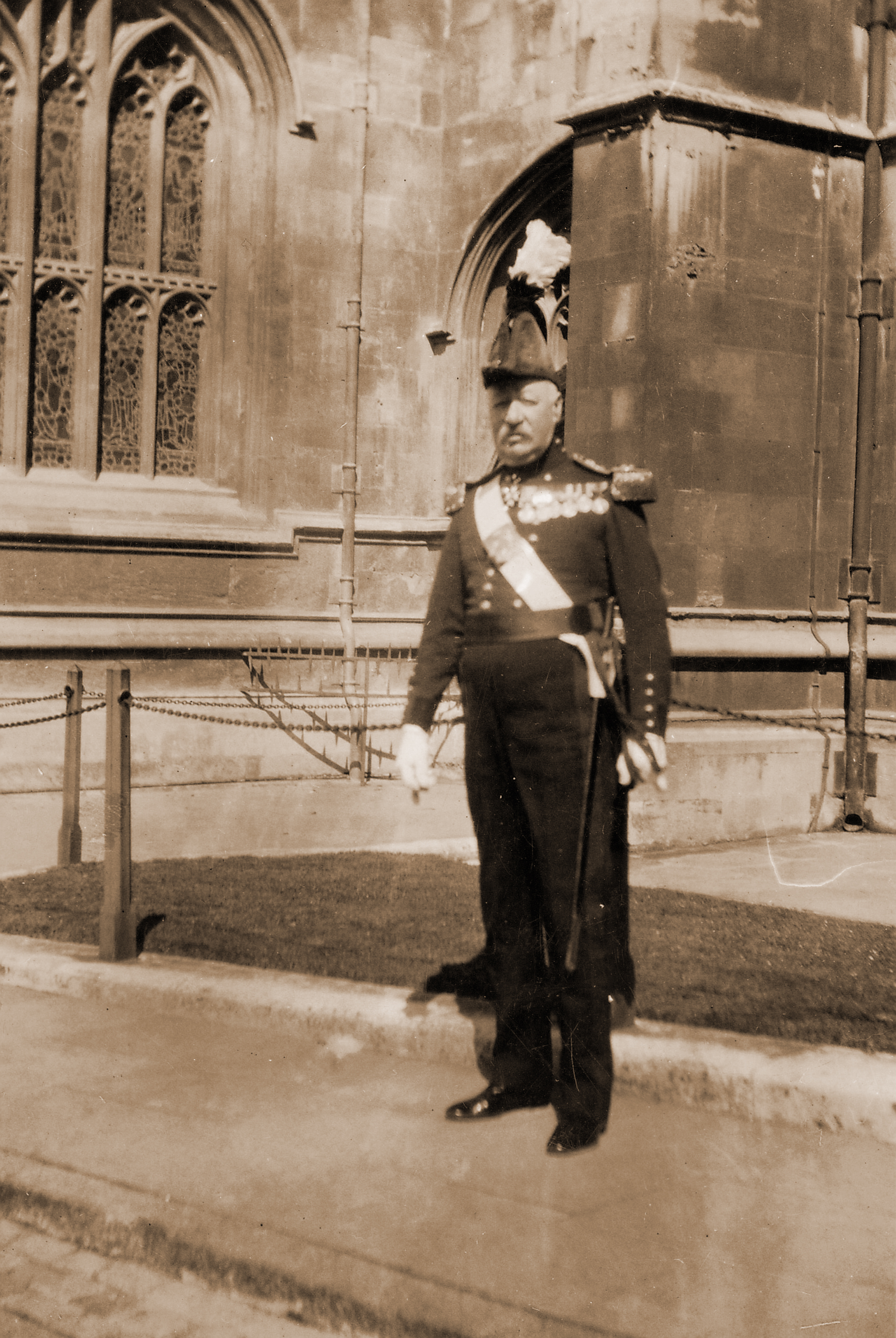
Colonel R. S. H. Moody (1854–1930) at Windsor Castle circa 1920

=== India ===
Between 1895 and 1897, Moody served in the Chitral Expedition, in which he was part of General William Forbes Gatacre's flying column, and served during 1895 under Sir Robert Low with the 1st battalion of the 3rd Regiment of Foot, including at Mamugai, for which he received the medal with clasp.

Moody was part of the Malakand Field Force in 1897, during which he was second-in-command of the 1st battalion of the 3rd Regiment of Foot under General Sir Bindon Blood (after whom he named his youngest daughter, Barbara Bindon), including at Bajaur and Mohmand. During this conflict, he was wounded, received the clasp, and was mentioned in dispatches. He there fought with Winston Churchill, who mentions him in Chapter XII (At Inayat Kila) of The Story of the Malakand Field Force.

=== Second Boer War ===
Moody lived at 2 Sydenham Grove, Sydenham Road, Cheltenham, in 1899.

Between 1899 and 1902, Moody served in the Second Boer War, for which he was mentioned in dispatches at least twice. He was promoted to lieutenant-colonel on 24 February 1900 to command a battalion of the Royal Munster Fusiliers. He went to South Africa to command the 2nd battalion of the Royal Irish Fusiliers, from January 1901 to end of campaign, for which he was again mentioned in despatches. He returned to England on the SS Custodian which landed at Southampton in August 1902.

He was appointed a Companion of the Order of the Bath (CB) in the South Africa honours list, which was published on 26 June 1902, and he received both the Queen's and the King's medals with 5 clasps. He received these honours from Edward VII at Buckingham Palace on 24 October 1902.

Moody was back in South Africa, in command of the 2nd battalion, from which he and about 640 officers and men left for Bombay, India, on the SS Soudan in January 1903, to be stationed in Rawalpindi, where his youngest daughter Barbara Bindon Moody was born.

=== World War I ===
Moody initially retired from the military during 1906, to serve as Commander of the Devon and Somerset Brigade of the Territorial Army until 1910. However, subsequent to the outbreak of World War I in 1914, Moody rejoined active service and raised the 7th battalion Royal Irish Fusiliers. He served also as Colonel of 2nd battalion Royal Irish Fusiliers and, during 1915, as Commandant of a School of Instruction for Officers at Dover. He during 1916 raised, from the Devonshire Regiment, and took to France, a battalion of the Labour Corps, of which he was the Commander from 1917 to 1918, after which he retired again.

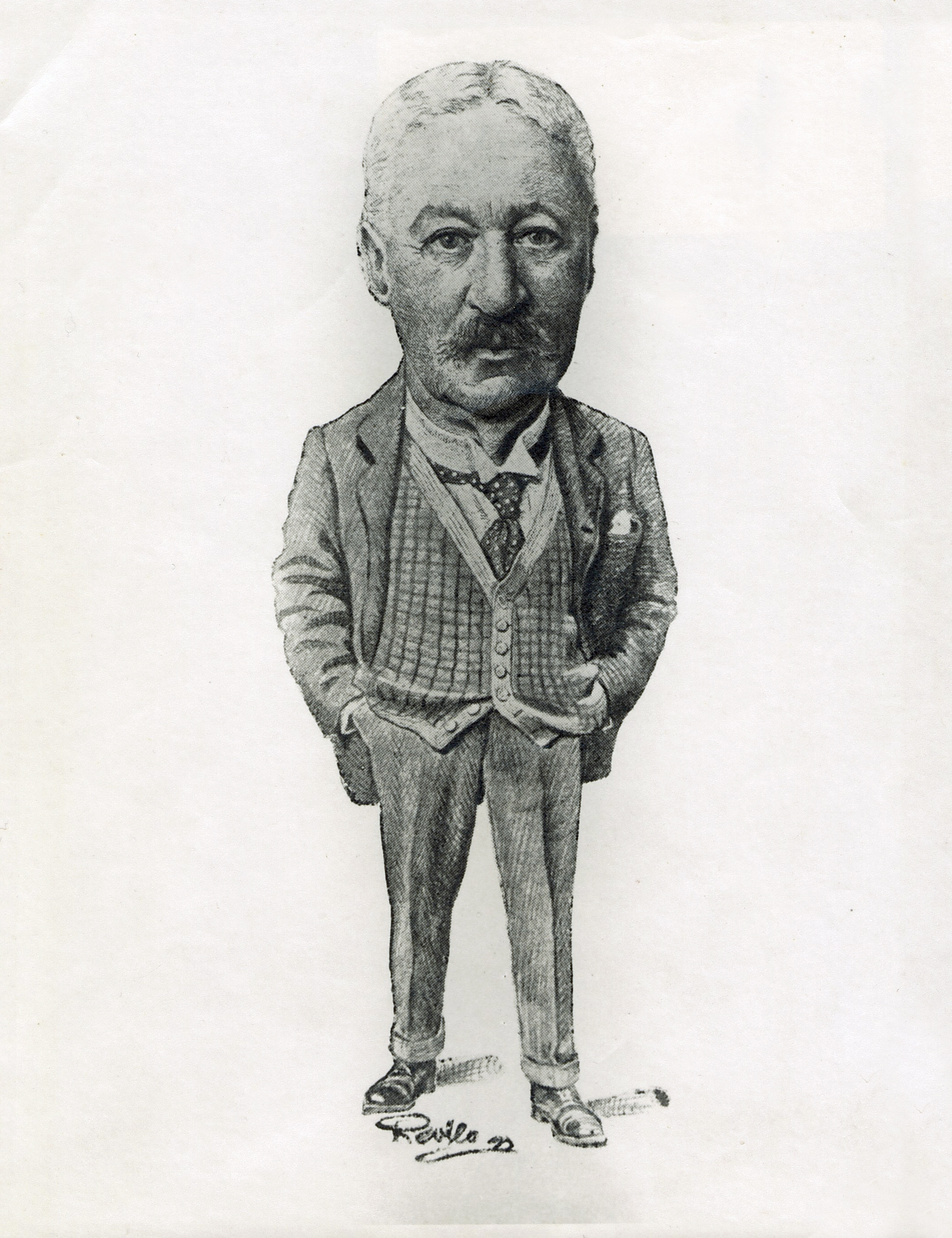
Caricature of Colonel R. S. H. Moody (1854 -1930) circa 1920

=== Military Knight of Windsor and Military Historian ===
Moody lost his brother, Henry de Clervaux Moody, in the Second Boer War in 1900, and his only son, Thomas Lewis Vyvian Moody, in World War I in 1918. Moody was appointed an honorary Colonel of the Buffs (East Kent Regiment) and a Military Knight of Windsor on 22 April 1921. He was a member of the Naval and Military Club, and lived at Cullompton, Devon.

Moody, at the request of The Buffs, wrote The Historical Records of The Buffs (East Kent Regiment), 3rd Regiment of Foot, 1914–1919, which was published during 1923. He during 1922 gave the first copy of the book to the Royal Library, Windsor.

Moody died on 11 March 1930 at Windsor Castle. His funeral at Windsor involved a guard-of-honour by the 1st battalion of the Scots Guards. His ashes are buried at All Saints' Churchyard in Monkland, Herefordshire, where at Plot 62 there is a memorial to him, and to his sister, Gertrude, and to his son, Thomas Lewis Vyvian Moody.

== Marriage ==
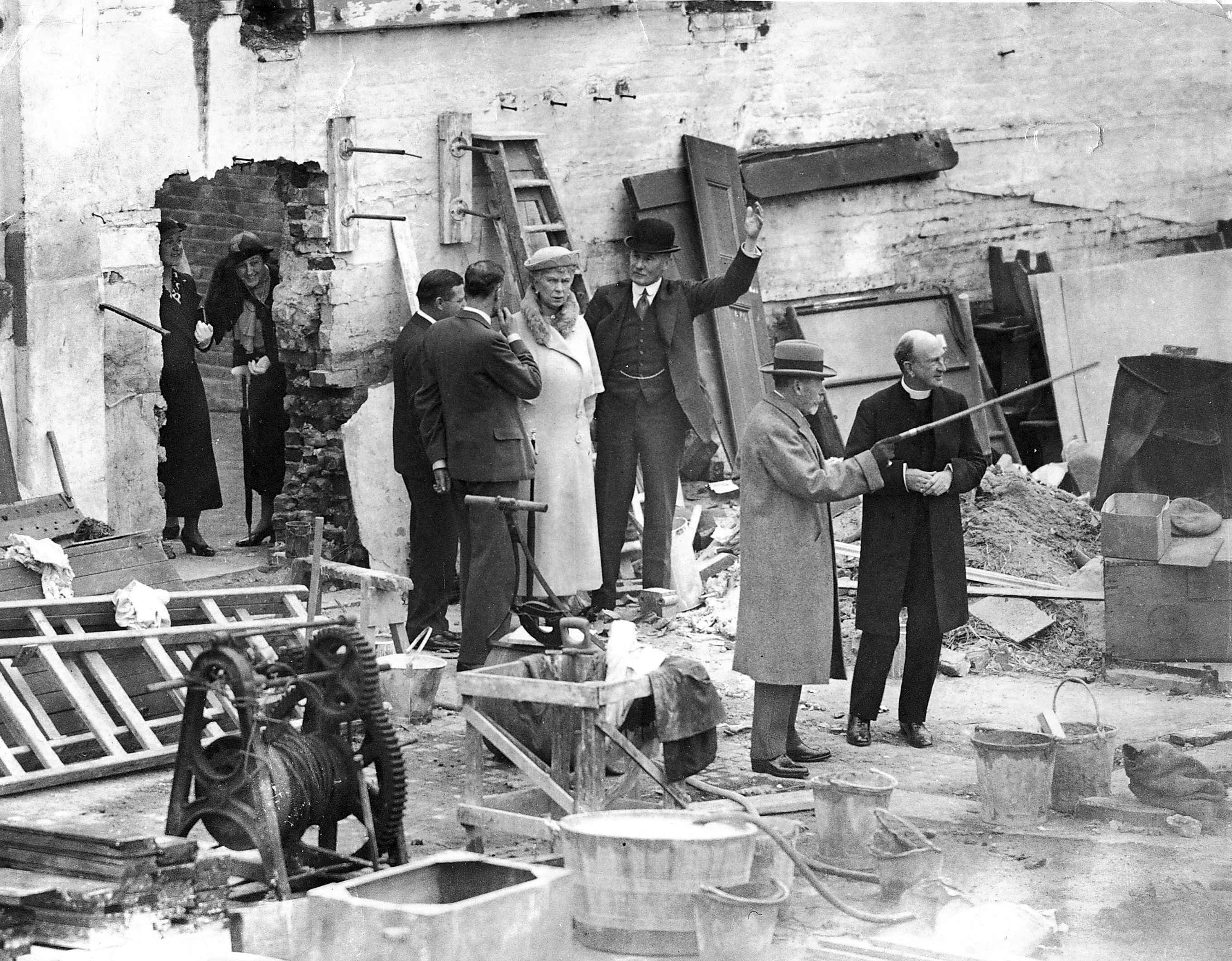
Moody's youngest daughter Barbara Bindon Webb-Jones (farthest left) with Queen Mary (centre) and King George V (second from right)

Moody in 1881 married, at Muston, Filey, Mary Latimer, Royal Red Cross, (d. 1936), who was the second of five children of the solicitor John Latimer (b. 1827, Kirklinton Hall, d. aged 54 years), of Horsfall and Latimer Solicitors, Park Row, and St. Mark's Villas, Leeds, and Hannah Maria Lawson (who was the daughter of James Lawson of Bramhope Manor).

Mary Latimer's paternal grandmother was Anne Moody who was the niece of Moody's grandfather Colonel Thomas Moody, CRE WI, ADC, Kt.. Mary Latimer's uncle was Nichol Latimer, who was the publisher of The North China Herald which was the most influential newspaper in China.

Mary Latimer's brother Hugh Graham Latimer (b. 1863) was articled to his father as a solicitor, served as a Lieutenant in 3rd battalion West Yorkshire Regiment and inherited his father's farming, before emigrating to Almyra, Arkansas, by 1904.

=== Issue ===
Moody and Mary Latimer had four children:

1. Mary Latimer ('Molly') (b. 1883, d. 1960). Married Major-General James Fitzgerald Martin on 5 June 1906, at Exeter Cathedral, and had one daughter, Mary Charlotte (b. 20 September 1909, The Court, Cullompton, Devon), who married, on 20 September 1929, at Holy Trinity Brompton, Gerald Dawson Kitchingman, Royal Engineers, by whom she had one son, Richard Martin Kitchingman (b. 1 March 1933).
2. Marjorie Brogden (b. 1886, d. 1962, Dennington, Suffolk). Married Arthur Graham Brown, in 1914, and had two sons, George Arthur and Thomas Lionel Vyvian. Thomas Lionel Vyvian was educated at Cheltenham College and at Royal Military Academy, Woolwich, before he was commissioned in the Royal Engineers, with whom he went to Egypt with the 1st Armoured Division. He received the George Medal for service during the Battle of El Aghelia 17 January 1942.
3. Thomas Lewis Vyvian (b. 4 November 1896, Peshawar, Bengal, d. 21 March 1918, killed in action, Lagnicourt, France). He was educated at Cheltenham College, at Eastbourne College, and at Royal Military Academy, Sandhurst. Subsequent to leaving Eastbourne, he served on HMS Worcester, with the Royal Indian Marine, until the outbreak of the First World War in 1914, whereupon, during 1915, he entered the Australian Army at Melbourne. He served with the 9th Service battalion and the 8th battalion of the Royal Warwickshire Regiment during the Gallipoli Campaign. Subsequent to his wounding, he entered Sandhurst, from which he was commissioned, as Lieutenant, in the 1st battalion of the Buffs (Royal East Kent Regiment), with which he served on the Western Front from July 1916. He was fatally shot, whilst he was in command of two platoons that were surrounded by German troops near Lagnicourt, by a German officer with a revolver. He is commemorated at the Arras Memorial, France, and at The Royal Memorial Chapel, Chapel Square, Royal Military Academy Sandhurst. He died unmarried and without issue, ending the eldest line of his eponymous great-grandfather.
4. Barbara Bindon (b. 14 June 1903, India, d. 1974). Her middle-name was that of her father's general Sir Bindon Blood. Barbara married the choral educator and RAF officer James William Webb-Jones on 20 December 1930 at Parish Church, Windsor, and had one daughter, Bridget who married the choral educator Peter Stanley Lyons at Wells Cathedral in 1957.

== Published works ==
- Moody, Colonel Richard Stanley Hawks (1922). The Historical Records of The Buffs (East Kent Regiment), (3rd Regiment of Foot), formerly designated the Holland Regiment and Prince George of Denmark's Regiment, 1914 – 1919. Medici Society, London.

== Ancestry ==
Ancestors of Richard Stanley Hawks Moody

16. Thomas Moody (1694, Alloway - 1732) (grandson of Henry Moody (fl. 1673) and his wife Hannah Washington)
8. Thomas Moody (1732, Arthuret – 1796) (who had fought for the Jacobites at the Battle of Culloden when he was aged only 13 years)
17. Janet Agnes Smith (married 1723, Dalrymple, as his second wife)
4. Colonel Thomas Moody ADC, CRE WI, Kt. (uncle of Clement Moody (clergyman))
18. John Blamire
Barbara Blamire (1740 – 1806)
2. Major-General Richard Clement Moody Kt.
10. Richard Clement (1754–1829)
5. Martha Clement (1784 – 1868) (sister-in-law of Philippa Cobham Alleyne and aunt of Richard Clement (cricketer) and Reynold Clement)
22. Thomas Dougan of Demerara
11. Susannah Dougan (first wife of Richard Clement)
1. Colonel Richard Stanley Hawks Moody CB (married Mary Latimer R. R. C., who was the niece of Nichol Latimer, in 1881)
24. William Hawks Junior (d. 1810)
12. George Hawks of Blackheath (1766 - 1820) (brother of Sir Robert Shafto Hawks)
6. Joseph Stanley Hawks, JP DL, Sheriff of Newcastle
3. Mary Susannah Hawks
28. William Boyd Senior
14. William Boyd Junior (1773 - 1855) (father of Edward Fenwick Boyd)
29. Juliana Peat
7. Mary Elizabeth Boyd (aunt of The Ven. Charles Twining Boyd)
30. Robert Locke
15. Esther Locke (1777 - 1818)
