= Thomas Moody (colonial officer) =

British Colonial Office expert

Colonel Thomas Moody Kt. JP

Aide-de-camp to the British Colonial Office (1806–1849); Home Secretary for Foreign Parliamentary Commissioners (1821–1828); Commander of the Royal Engineers (1829–1837); Director of the British Royal Gunpowder Manufactory (1832–1840); Inspector of British Gunpowder (1840–1849)
- Monarchs: George IV; William IV; Victoria

Personal details
- Born: 1779 Arthuret, Longtown, Cumbria
- Died: 5 September 1849 (aged 70 years) Berrywood House, Millbrook Road (now Freemantle), Hampshire (since demolished)
- Spouse: Martha Clement (1784–1868)
- Relations: Colonel Richard Stanley Hawks Moody CB (grandson); Commander Thomas Barrington Moody of the Royal Navy (grandson); Major Richard Charles Lowndes MC (great-grandson); Clement Moody, Vicar of Newcastle (nephew); Richard Clement (cousin); Reynold Clement (cousin)
- Children: 10 including: Major-General Richard Clement Moody; The Rev. James Leith Moody; Colonel Hampden Clement Blamire Moody CB
- Parent(s): Thomas Moody (b. 1732); Barbara Blamire
- Education: University of Oxford (DCL)
- Occupation: Royal Engineer (1806–1849); Colonial Office expert (1806–1849); Director of the British Royal Gunpowder Manufactory (1832–1849)
- Committees: British Parliamentary Commission on West Indian Slavery (1821–1828); Inspector of British Gunpowder (1840–1849)
- Awards: Knight of the Order of Military Merit of France (1820); Justice of the Peace (1826); DCL (Oxon); Knight of the Order of Glory (Ottoman Empire) (1839)

Military service
- Allegiance: United Kingdom
- Branch/service: Royal Engineers
- Years of service: 1806 – 1849
- Rank: Colonel
- Commands: Royal Engineers in West Indies (1829–1837)
- Battles/wars: Napoleonic Wars; Invasion of Guadeloupe

Colonel Thomas Moody JP (1779–1849) was a British Colonial Office expert on the West Indies; Commander of the Royal Engineers in the West Indies; Home Secretary for Foreign Parliamentary Commissioners; Director of the British Royal Gunpowder Manufactory; and Inspector of British Gunpowder.

Moody was knighted by France, by Louis XVIII, in their Order of Military Merit, and by the Ottoman Empire, in their Order of Glory. Moody and his friend Sir James Stirling offered to colonise Australia using their own capital, but were prohibited from doing so by the British Government.

Moody was the father of a Major-General Richard Clement Moody (who was the founder of British Columbia and first British Governor of the Falkland Islands); and of Colonel Hampden Clement Blamire Moody CB (who was the Commander of the Royal Engineers in China during the Taiping Rebellion and Second Opium War).

== Family ==
Thomas Moody (the fourth) was born in Arthuret, Longtown, Cumbria, into an armigerous high church landed gentry family that had a history of military service, and who had included Jacobites, and who had in-common ancestry with George Washington, the founder and first President of the United States of America.

His middle brother George (1773 - 1844), of Longtown and later of Leeds, was a surgeon whose sixth son was the high church clergyman and theologian Clement Moody, Vicar of Newcastle. George Moody's daughter Jane married Lewis Alexander of Hopwood Hall, Halifax, West Yorkshire, who was the father of the barrister Robert Alexander FRS FSA. The granddaughter of George Moody's other daughter Anne Moody married Thomas Moody's grandson Colonel Richard Stanley Hawks Moody.

Thomas Moody (the fourth)'s eldest brother Charles Senior (1771 – 1830), of Longtown, inherited the family's trade of foreign food-commodities. Charles Moody Senior married, on 19 November 1801, Jane Forster (1764 – 1841), and both are buried at Arthuret. They had two children, the West Indies planter Charles Moody Junior (1796 - 1818) who died at Demerara during January 1818, and Barbara (1803 – 1820), both of whom died unmarried and without issue.

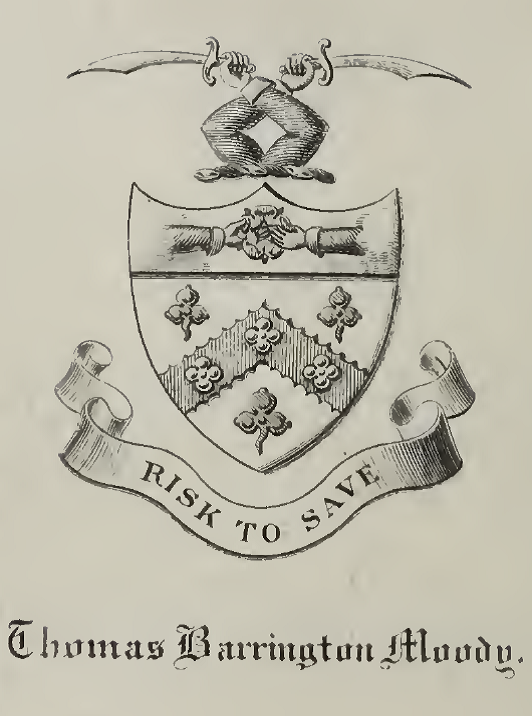
Arms of Colonel Thomas Moody (1779–1849), shown over the name of his grandson Commander Thomas Barrington Moody (b. 1848), Royal Navy.

=== Relation to Washington family ===
In 1649, subsequent to the defeat of the royalist cause in the English Civil War, Sir Henry Moody, 2nd Baronet, had sold the Wiltshire estate of Garsdon to Sir Lawrence Washington.

Thomas Moody (the fourth)'s great-great grandparents were Henry Moody, a London merchant who was listed as a member of the landed gentry in 1673, and Hannah Washington, who was the daughter of the merchant Robert Washington (b. 1616, Adwick le Street, Yorkshire, d. 1674, Rotterdam) of Austhorpe Hall, Leeds. Hannah Moody (née Washington)'s brother James, who worked in the London-Rotterdam trade, sailed to the USA with his cousin John Washington (1633 – 1677), who was the great-grandfather of the founder of the USA, in 1657, on Edward Prescott’s tobacco ship. However, whereas John stayed in North America, James subsequently returned to Europe on the ship.

His great-great grandmother Hannah Moody (née Washington)'s father Robert Washington's parents were Darcie Washington Senior (d. 1657), of University College, Oxford, and Anne Wentworth of Bretton. His ancestor Sir John Washington (d. 1331) was the brother of Sir Robert Washington (d. 1324) who was the progenitor of the branch of the Washington family of Sulgrave Manor, from whom the founder of the USA was descended. Her other brother was Joseph Washington (1660 - 1693) of Gray’s Inn, who was a translator of Lucian and of Milton, who is buried in the Bencher’s Vault of Temple Church.

== Character and society ==
=== Education ===
He was privately tutored by Westminster School-educated tutors from Edinburgh University. Like his sons, Moody was a polymath who was extensively read in history, economics, philosophy, climatology, physics, and surveillance, and was fluent in English, French, and Dutch. His primary influence were the works of Montesquieu; William Petty; William Robertson; Charles-Augustin de Coulomb (whom he knew personally); Johannes van den Bosch; and those of the Africans Toussaint Louverture and Henri Christophe, and he was read in abolitionist literature and influenced by the contemporary Jean-Pierre Boyer who was the African president of Haiti.

=== Society ===
Moody was described by Stapleton Cotton, 1st Viscount Combermere, to whom he served as aide-de-camp from 1817 to 1820, as 'a very intelligent person': and by 20th century historian D. J. Murray as 'an expert on West Indian affairs in general' who 'helped to provide an understanding in the [Colonial] Office of problems the existence of which was barely comprehended, [and] raised fundamental questions and explained the wider implications of the Government's course of action': and by Sir Humphrey Fleming Senhouse as 'an officer of high character and reputation' and 'an officer of high intelligence who examines and speaks cautiously'. He was employed by the Duke of Wellington to advise on defence. He had 'all [the London establishment]'s archives open to him' and was 'almost an obvious choice' to be 'Home Secretary for Foreign Parliamentary Commissioners'. He was invited to the Coronation of George IV in 1820 and to that of William IV in 1830.

He was also a freemason. He was a Director of the Crown Life Assurance Company, of 33 Bridge Street, Blackfriars, City of London; and a Director of the New Brunswick and Nova Scotia Land Company, of 5 Copthall Court, City of London. He was a member of Thomas Campbell's Conduit Street Club, and of London's United Service Club and Political Economy Club, at which he disputed the economics of James Mill, of John Ramsay McCulloch, and of Adam Smith, and admired the philosophy of Jean-Baptiste Say.

He invited the Whig chess champion Alexander McDonnell, whom he thought to have an 'unquestionably clever' 'cool and reasoning manner', to Downing Street to discuss economics. His other friends included Sir Robert Wilmot Horton (with whom he had an extensive correspondence, and after whom he named one of his sons); Shute Barrington, Bishop of Durham (after whom he named another of his sons); Sir James Leith (after whom he named another of his sons); Sir Humphrey Fleming Senhouse; Sir James Stirling (with whom he offered to colonise Australia using their own capital); the botanist James Mangles FRS (whom he advised about the Swan River Colony); Thomas Hyde Villiers; and the geographer James Macqueen (whom he contended to be 'a most unmanageable person').

== West Indies ==
=== Aide-de-camp (1797–1821) ===
'[Moody] being a very intelligent person, and having been employed in various situations, these gave him opportunities of acquiring a thorough knowledge of the local details, etc. of those islands and Colonies [the West Indies], and a great deal of useful information may be collected from him'.

— Stapleton Cotton, 1st Viscount Combermere about Thomas Moody, in a letter to Sir Robert Wilmot Horton that is dated 15 December 1821.

The first member of the Moody family to emigrate to Barbados had been Captain John Moody (d. 1673), who was the son of Sir Henry Moody, 2nd Baronet, and the grandson of Deborah, Lady Moody, and who has a memorial at St. Michael's Cathedral Church in St Michael, Barbados, in the cross-walk that runs from the south to the north porch.

Thomas Moody (the fourth) arrived in Barbados in 1797, to be mathematics master, writing master, and Assistant Headmaster, of the Anglican Codrington College, at which he served until 1805. Moody there demonstrated such aptitude for mathematics that Lord Seaforth, who was the British General in Barbados obtained for Moody a commission in the Royal Engineers, which Moody entered as a Lieutenant on 1 July 1806. The Royal Engineers during the 19th century were a socially exclusive elite land-marine force, whose officers were drawn from the upper middle class and landed gentry of British society, who performed, in addition to military engineering, 'reconnaissance work, led storming parties, demolished obstacles in assaults, carried out rear-guard actions in retreats and other hazardous tasks'.

Moody's first duty was to administer the Office of Ordinance in Demerara, after which he was promoted to the Government Secretaryships of Demerara and Berbice, as which he served for three years. Moody was promoted to Second Captain on 1 May 1811; to Captain on 20 December 1814; and to Brevet Major on 23 May 1816. He was put on half-pay by the Army, in 1815, after the cessation of the Napoleonic Wars, after which he worked for one year in Guiana as an attorney for the Bohemian Jew Wolfert Katz, who was its wealthiest planter.

Moody served as aide-de-camp to Sir James Leith, who was Governor of Barbados from May 1815 to October 1816, and as Superintendent of the Crown Plantations in Guadeloupe. Moody named his son James Leith Moody after Leith, of whom he was an admirer. Thomas was involved in the successful Invasion of Guadeloupe (1815), for which he was subsequently knighted, in 1820, by Louis XVIII, in the Order of Military Merit. He was permitted by George IV to wear the Cross of the Order, but not to use the title 'Sir'. In 1816, Moody was responsible for the transfer of Africans, whom the Royal Navy had rescued from slave-ships since the abolition of the slave-trade, to the Crown estates in Guadeloupe, where they were to be employed as apprentices.

Moody knew that the rescued Africans made an 'extremely useful' contribution to the British Empire. Moody witnessed the Barbados slave-rebellions of September and October 1816, which he described as an attempt 'by the mass of the slaves... to gain independence': and he during September 1816 endorsed a request that the Prince Regent 'recommend in the strongest manner to the local authorities in the respective colonies, to carry into effect every measure which may tend to promote the moral and religious improvement, as well as the comfort and happiness of the negroes'. Moody contended that blacks ought to be treated without partiality to whites.

Moody received the rank of Major in the Royal Engineers for his services in the West Indies. Moody then served as aide-de-camp to both the President of Tortola; and to Stapleton Cotton, 1st Viscount Combermere, who was Governor of Barbados from 1817 to 1820, after whom Moody named one of his sons. Moody was described by Stapleton Cotton, 1st Viscount Combermere in a letter from the same to Sir Robert Wilmot Horton that be dated 15 December 1821, as '[a] very intelligent person, and having been employed in various situations, these gave him opportunities of acquiring a thorough knowledge of the local details, etc. of those islands and Colonies [the West Indies], and a great deal of useful information may be collected from him'. Moody surveyed Berbice, including the Berbice River and Canje River in The Guianas, during 1820. Moody owned estates in Barbados, in Tortola, and in The Guianas: but he freed his and his wife's slaves without claiming any of the offered compensation except for one enslaved person, who was of British Guiana, whom he had trained to be a comptroller.

=== Appointment as Home Secretary for Foreign Parliamentary Commissioners (1821–1828) ===
In 1821, William Wilberforce proposed to the House of Commons that the Colonial Office create a Commission to investigate reports that the Slave Trade Act 1807 was violated by owners who had untruly redesignated their slaves as 'apprentices'. There were to be two commissioners who were to report to Lord Bathurst, Secretary of State for War and the Colonies. Moody and the Demerara planter and Tortola privateer John Dougan (29 November 1765 – 1826) volunteered for the commissionerships and were selected by Bathurst. They were appointed as Commissioners by letters patent of 6 November 1821.

'It is of infinitely great importance for Lord Bathurst to have laid before him clear statements of facts rather than mere opinions... It is so much easier to give an opinion than to describe carefully and accurately a tedious series of facts. It is, however, from these facts only that Lord Bathurst can form his own principles practically to guide his judgment'.

— Thomas Moody, in a letter to Sir Robert Wilmot Horton, 3 July 1826.

Sir Robert Wilmot Horton, Undersecretary of State for the Colonies, wrote to Moody, 'I do not know any man more competent (if so competent) to direct the application of labour as yourself'. Moody had improved the efficacy of the Colonial Office in London: he had improved the efficacy of the annual Blue Books, which had been introduced in 1821, and introduced, as his own invention, new Brown Books in which further statistical information from every colony was entered every six months for the London Colonial Office. The subjects of the analyses by Moody for the Colonial Office included: 'The duties and means of increasing the utility of naval officers in the West Indies'; the history of the Crown Estates of Berbice; and the conditions of labour on the sugar-plantations of the West Indies'. Moody also wrote the 1825 Considerations in Defence of the Orders in Council for the Melioration of Slavery in Trinidad: a copy of which is in the library of the Royal Commonwealth Society. Historian D. J. Murray provides a synopsis of Moody's contribution to the Colonial Office: 'He [Moody] helped to provide an understanding in the Office of problems the existence of which was barely comprehended, [and] he raised fundamental questions and explained the wider implications of the Government's course of action'. Moody considered his objective to be the identification of factual evidence that would enable Lord Bathurst and Wilmot Horton to make accurate decisions: and Moody was contemptuous of the inclusion of unproven assertions in political discourse: Moody wrote, on 3 July 1826, 'It is of infinitely great importance for Lord Bathurst to have laid before him clear statements of facts rather than mere opinions... It is so much easier to give an opinion than to describe carefully and accurately a tedious series of facts. It is, however, from these facts only that Lord Bathurst can form his own principles practically to guide his judgment'. Moody's contention that only factual evidence could be a valid determiner of practice was taught to his protégé Sir James Stephen.

Dougan (who was the maternal uncle of Moody's wife Martha Clement (1784–1868) was born and raised in Demerara where his father Thomas owned sugar-plantations: and stated, 'all my nearest relations and friends were either Planters or Owners of slaves'. Dougan had worked as a privateer and as a Prize Agent for the Royal Navy on Tortola. Dougan was influenced by the evangelical Whigs such as the Quaker John Barton, and by the Clapham Sect. Moody was influenced by Montesquieu, William Petty, William Robertson, Charles-Augustin de Coulomb, Johannes van den Bosch, and by the Africans Toussaint Louverture, Henri Christophe, and Jean-Pierre Boyer who was the President of Haiti. Moody's protégé's Stephen's recommendation, in 1802, of indenture created the basis for both the Act for the Abolition of the Slave Trade, and for the Orders in Council.

Moody and Dougan arrived on Tortola in May 1822 despite that Moody objected to the stipulated interview process in which masters and apprentices were to be interviewed together: because Moody thought that that practice were 'calculated to excite complaints of the servant against the master'. The slaveowners interviewed by Moody included Abraham Mendes Belisario, who was the Deputy Provost Marshal of Tortola, who owned 17 slaves. Moody insisted that the unreliable 'Character' reports that were provided by the masters ought not to be included in the Commission's report: and that rather he and Dougan ought to specify their assessment of the masters. The Commissioners recorded that African apprentices were employed by free black Africans. When apprentices employed by Hugh C. Maclean, who was Comptroller of the Customs on Tortola, stole livestock, Maclean had them beaten. Dougan objected to Moody's refusal to criticise Maclean: but did not receive any sympathy from the government of the islands. Dougan replied that Moody was an agent 'not of His Majesty's government, but of the colonial assemblies'; and complained of the 'state of Irritation and Disunion of the Commission'; and asserted that as a consequence of '[the] repeated attacks, [and] the State of Irritation of Major Moody's Mind... all hopes of Conciliation [were] ended'. Moody replied that Dougan '[had] for some time past obviously been affected by a termination of blood to his head'.

John Dougan resigned from the Commission in June 1822 and returned to England to submit to the House of Commons his report, which is dated 20 December 1823, in which he contends that 'free labour in the West Indies is preferable to compulsory labour'. Sir Robert Wilmot Horton (who had by 1824 written, with Charles Ellis, 1st Baron Seaford, an anti-abolitionist article for John Murray's Quarterly Review for which John Taylor Coleridge wrote anti-abolitionist articles) forwarded in 1824 one of Moody's papers to George Canning, who was then Secretary of State for Foreign Affairs, In April 1824, Moody received the official title of 'Home Secretary for Foreign Parliamentary Commissioners'. Moody believed that this title were inaccurate: he wrote in a letter to Robert William Hay, of 14 July 1828, 'my real duties have been more connected with the West India Department, the Colonial Finance Accounts, and the correspondence and details relative to emigration'. Moody, who had returned to London by 9 January 1824, in 1825 presented to the House of Commons the official Commission report, with an exposition of the reasons for his refusal to sign Dougan's report. Moody's first report, which is dated 2 March 1825 and consists of over 200 pages, contends that 'without some species of coercion African labour would be worthless'. Thomas Babington Macaulay described Moody's report as 'in substance, a defence of West Indian slavery' but Macaulay's description is inaccurate because Moody did not desire the Africans' employment as slaves, but as apprentices. Moody described his anti-slavery theory as a 'Philosophy of Labour', and himself as a 'practical philanthropist'. Moody, who was extensively read in abolitionist literature, contended that it were a 'physical fact' that only blacks could perform in the 'torrid zone'. Moody's conclusion was that the Africans in the West Indies should be taken back to Africa.

Moody submitted his second report, also of over 200 pages, in 1826. This analysed agricultural colonies in the Netherlands, the Bengal peasantry, slavery in India, prostitution in Sierra Leone during the African Institution, slavery in the United States, and the American Colonization Society for African-American settlement in West Africa. Moody also studied the agriculture and the commerce of Egypt, the commerce of Carthage, and the religions of Abyssinia. Moody's contentions were endorsed by the director of the Commission, Lord Bathurst; and by the same's Under-Secretary, Sir Robert Wilmot Horton; and by the British Parliament, which stated Moody's 'great experience in the control of labour, both slave and free, both African and European, in garrison, and in the field'. Moody's reports provoked ire in the evangelical Whig abolitionists, who desired a 'free black peasantry' rather than equality for Africans. Zachary Macaulay in the Anti-Slavery Reporter censured Moody's contentions; and Thomas Babington Macaulay in the Edinburgh Review in 1827, and in a series of anonymous letters to the Morning Chronicle newspaper, censured Moody's contentions and his rhetoric. Moody, in correspondences and in the newspapers, repudiated the assertions by his critics.

Sir Robert Wilmot Horton and Thomas Hyde Villiers MP consequently wrote articles (which were ascribed to the pseudonym 'Vindex', which Moody also used) to The Star newspaper, in which they refuted the objections to Moody's contentions and to the Government's policy. Moody testified before the Privy Council in November 1827, about the manumission of slaves in Berbice and Demerara, and in 1828. Moody's reports influenced Lord Bathurst; and Moody's protégé Sir James Stephen; and Moody's successor Sir Henry Taylor. Historian D. J. Murray contends that Hyde Villiers and Taylor were only advisors, rather than experts like Moody and Stephen.

John Dougan and Moody were each made a justice of the peace for their work as Commissioners. Dougan died indigent in Georgetown, Guyana, during September 1826, before he had completed his reply to Moody's second report that subsequently was completed by his daughter Mary Dougan (b. 1804) who inherited Dougan's 'protracted and unpleasant dispute' with Moody. Mary Dougan (b. 21 July 1804, West Indies) was the daughter of Clarissa Squire, whom John Dougan had married in 1798, and who was the daughter of merchant Joseph Squire by his second wife Elizabeth Spurrell. She had been baptised on 19 March 1806, at the Holy Trinity Church Clapham, by The Rev. John Venn, who was a member of the Clapham Sect, and her godfather was Mary Stephen Dougan godfather was the abolitionist lawyer James Stephen (1758-1832).

=== Moody's offer to colonise Australia (1828) ===
When the British Government renounced the former's plan to settle the Swan River Colony: Sir James Stirling and Moody, in August 1828, offered to form an association of private capitalists to use their own money settle Australia in fulfilment of the 'principles' of William Penn's settlement of Pennsylvania. Moody had previously advised Stirling's relation James Mangles about the settlement of the Swan River Colony at minimal cost to the British Government. Their proposal was rejected by the British Government.

=== West Indian Service; Director of Gunpowder; Civic Engineer (1828–1849) ===
Moody's office at the Colonial Office was abolished in 1828 whilst he, a high church Anglican like his nephew Clement Moody, Vicar of Newcastle, was 'unpopular with the Saints [evangelicals]'. Moody then was employed in London by the Duke of Wellington to advise on the defence of the West Indies, to which he returned in 1828 to perform special service in the Dutch colonies for Sir Robert Wilmot Horton, which he completed in 1829. Moody served as Commander of the Royal Engineers in the West Indies from 1829 to 1832. He was promoted to Lieutenant-Colonel in 1830.

The British Government consulted Moody for important engineering projects: including the Caledonian Railway, and the West Cumberland Railway, and the Furness Railway, and the embankments at Morecambe Bay and Duddon Sands. On 13 October 1832 he was appointed Director of the Royal Gunpowder Manufactory at Waltham Abbey, and of the Royal Small Arms Factory at Waltham Abbey. He received a DCL degree from the University of Oxford on 13 June 1834. He had been promoted to Superintendent of the Royal Gunpowder Manufactory at Waltham Abbey by 1835. He was a petitioner for the founding charter of the Colonial Bank of the West Indies in 1836 and a director of the Royal Polytechnic Institution in 1838. He was invested as a Knight of the Order of Glory (Ottoman Empire) on 6 July 1839, for his advice about the manufacture of gunpowder by the Ottoman Empire, and was appointed as British Inspector of Gunpowder on 2 July 1840. He had been posted to Government House, Guernsey, by 1841, and was promoted to Colonel in 1847.

Like his son Richard Clement Moody, Moody received from Britain only rank-promotions, rather than knighthoods, because its Government did not want to increase his social status above that of Sir Edward Bulwer-Lytton, whose father, although a General, was not even a knight. Moody's expertise contributed to the appointment his son Richard Clement Moody as Lieutenant-Governor of the Falkland Islands in 1841, when Richard Clement Moody was the unprecedentedly young age of 28 years.

=== Property and death ===
Moody's residences were: 7 Alfred Place, Bedford Square, Bloomsbury; and 23 Bolton Street, Mayfair; and 13 Curzon Street, Mayfair, where his son Wilmot Horton Moody was raised. He also owned Hortons Manor Farm, Hanley Castle, Worcestershire, from 1841. His wife's family owned three houses in Wilton Crescent, Belgravia, in addition to 13 Bolton Street, Mayfair. His final seat was the since demolished Berrywood House, Millbrook Road (now Freemantle), Hampshire, where he was frequently visited by his wife's relation Renn Hampden, Bishop of Hereford, and his wife's brother Hampden Clement. He died there on 5 September 1849.

On 2 June 1852, The Times of London advertised for a claimant of unclaimed property, of the value of £120, that had belonged to 'Lieutenant-Colonel [sic] Thomas Moody of Waltham Abbey', of which the dividends had not been claimed since 1839. His widow Martha was living at Bycroft Terrace, St. David, Exeter, during 1851, and died at Bournemouth on 30 March 1868.

== Marriage and issue ==
On 1 January 1809, Moody married Martha Clement (1784–1868), who was the daughter of the landowner Richard Clement (1754–1829) by the same's first wife Susannah Dougan (d. 1786) who was the sister of Moody's fellow Commissioner John Dougan (1765–1826).

His wife was the sister-in-law of Philippa Cobham Alleyne (1813–1889), who was the daughter of Sir Reynold Abel Alleyne, 2nd Baronet, and who was the mother of the cricketers Richard Clement and Reynold Clement of Belgravia.

Thomas Moody and Martha Clement had 10 children, 8 of whom outlived their father:

1. Thomas (b. 10 December 1809, Barbados, d. unmarried on 21 March 1839, Saint Vincent (Antilles)). Captain of the 70th (Surrey) Regiment of Foot and Major of The Buffs (Royal East Kent Regiment). His 1822 journal of his grand tour through France and Switzerland and Italy is now owned by the University of St Andrews.
2. Susannah (b. 29 August 1811, Barbados, d. unmarried 1884, St Leonards-on-Sea). She received an inheritance from her maternal grandfather Richard Clement.
3. Richard Clement (b. 18 February 1813, Barbados, d. 1887, Bournemouth). He was named after his maternal grandfather Richard Clement (1754–1829), from whom he received an inheritance. He was the first Governor of the Falkland Islands, where he founded Port Stanley, and the founder and first Lieutenant-Governor of British Columbia. He married Mary Susannah Hawks, who was the daughter of Joseph Stanley Hawks JP DL, Sheriff of Newcastle, on 6 July 1852, by whom he had 13 children including Colonel Richard Stanley Hawks Moody CB.
4. Sophia (b. 1 July 1814, Georgetown, Guyana, d. 1888, Royal Albert Hall Mansions, South Kensington, London). She accompanied her father to his posting to Guernsey, where she received a letter that her brother Richard Clement Moody had inserted into a bottle and thrown overboard on a journey to the Falkland Islands, from his ship the Hebe, from which it had been washed ashore, after 34 days in the water.
5. James Leith (b. 25 June 1816, Barbados, d. 1896). He was named after Sir James Leith, to whom his father had served as aide-de-camp during the Napoleonic Wars. James Leith Moody was educated at Tonbridge School and at St Mary Hall, Oxford. He served as Chaplain to Royal Navy and to the British Army. He married Mary Willan, who was the daughter of The Rev. Willan, on 15 October 1863, by whom he had 5 children including the lace- and elocution- expert Alice Penderel Moody and the soldier George Goldney Moody JP who married Anna Robertson.
6. Shute Barrington MICE (b. 21 February 1818, Teignmouth, d. 2 June 1851, Australia). He was named after Shute Barrington, Bishop of Durham. He was educated at Eton College, and subsequently studied engineering in Manchester and sugar-refinement in London. He resided at Burton Street (now South Eaton Place), Eaton Square, Belgravia, in 1843, when he was elected as a member of the Institution of Civil Engineers, and also owned property at No. 34, Fenchurch Street, London, and in Georgetown, Demerara, British Guiana. He from 1843 investigated sugar-manufacture in Demerara, and Barbados, and St. Kitts, and Saint Vincent and the Grenadines, and St. Croix, and Louisiana, and Cuba, for which he reported to Parliament in 1847 and in 1848. He married Sarah Blackburne, on 11 March 1847, at St. Michael's Church, Chester Square. Their son Thomas Barrington Moody (b. 29 March 1848: bapt. 5 May 1848 at St Botolph-without-Bishopsgate, London) was an artist and a Commander of the Royal Navy who served on HMS Boxer (1868) from 1871 to 1875, and on HMS Egeria (1873) from 1873 to 1881. His journal of his travels in Asia is held by the University of New South Wales, Canberra. Commander Thomas Barrington Moody married Mary Ellen ('Nellie') Dewrance by whom he had one daughter, Joan Barrington Moody (b. 26 February 1889, Blackheath, d. 4 May 1956, Nanyuki), who married, on 14 December 1914, Lieutenant-Colonel Allen Holford-Walker MC (1890– 1949) of the 2nd battalion of the Argyll and Sutherland Highlanders, who was involved in the first ever tank-battle during June 1916, with whom she had three children. Shute Barrington Moody died on 2 June 1851, in Australia, and is buried at the Cemetery of St. Matthew's Church, Kensington Road, Marryatville, Adelaide, South Australia.
7. Stapleton Cotton (b. March 1819, d. April 1820, Barbados). Named after Stapleton Cotton, 1st Viscount Combermere, to whom his father served as aide-de-camp from 1817 to 1820.
8. Hampden Clement Blamire CB (b. 20 January 1821, Bedford Square, Bloomsbury, d. 27 February 1869, Belfast). Colonel of the Royal Engineers, and Commander of the Royal Engineers in China and in Africa, and member of Hudson's Bay Company. He married, at Belfast in 1860, Louise Harriet Thompson, who was a daughter of Samuel Thomson. Their son Captain Hampden Lewis Clement (b. 28 February 1855, Hong Kong), of the Queen's Own Royal West Kent Regiment, served with the 2nd battalion in South Africa and in the Orange Free State and Orange River Colony, including at Biddulphsberg and Wittebergen, and in the Cape Colony, during 1900, before his retirement from the military in 1907.
9. Clementina Barbara (b. 1822, London, d. 26 July 1864)
10. Wilmot Horton (b. 6 June 1826, 23 Bolton Street, Mayfair, d. unmarried during December 1853, Kingston, Ontario). Wilmot Horton Moody was raised at 13 Curzon Street, Mayfair, and educated as a Gentleman Cadet at Royal Military Academy, Woolwich, from 1841 to 1845, and served from December 1845 as a Lieutenant in the Royal Artillery.
