= Pembroke Square, London =

Square in Kensington, London, England

Coordinates: 51.496787°N 0.198320°W

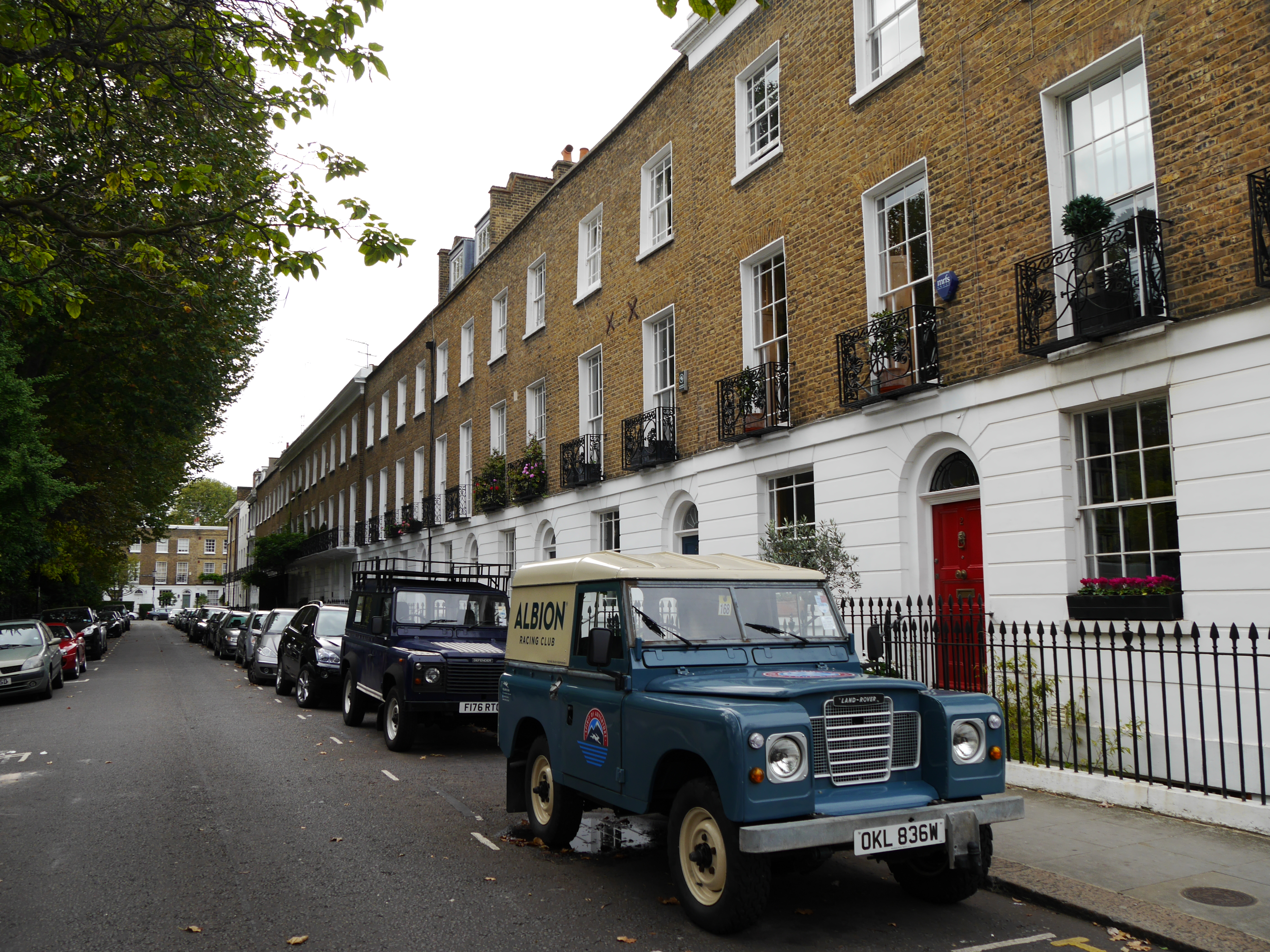
Pembroke Square

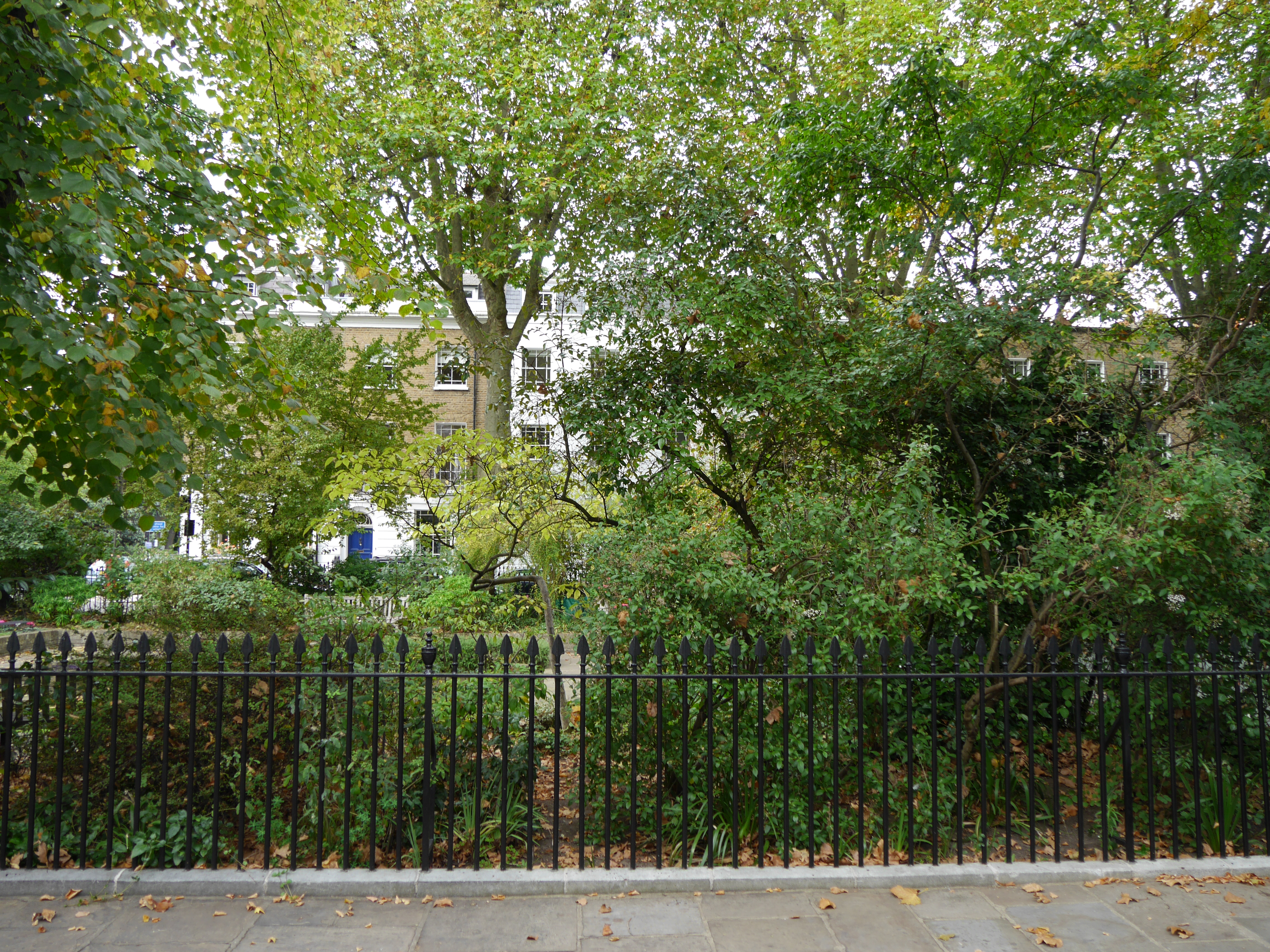
Pembroke Square

Pembroke Square is located in the Kensington area of southwest central London, England (postcode W8). The whole square is Grade II listed for its architectural merit. It was developed by the Hawks family.

The Hansom Cab is a Grade II listed public house on the corner with Earls Court Road.

38 Pembroke Square was the house used as the surgery of Dr Hirsh in the movie Sunday Bloody Sunday.

The novelist Vernon Lee lived at No.13. Immunologist Sir Almroth Wright lived at No.6 The playwright John McGrath (playwright) and his wife, the Scottish actress Elizabeth MacLennan lived at No 33a. The artist Alfred Leete died at his home No. 34 in 1933.

== Transport ==
There are two nearby underground stations, High Street Kensington and Earl's Court. Both stations are served by the District line which connects them to London's railway terminals.

There are also buses from High Street Kensington which go towards White City, Hammersmith and Wandsworth. London bus routes 9, 10, 27, 28, 49, 52, 70, 328, 452, C1, night routes N9, N28, N31, N52 and coach route 701/702.
