= The Hansom Cab =

Pub in Kensington, London

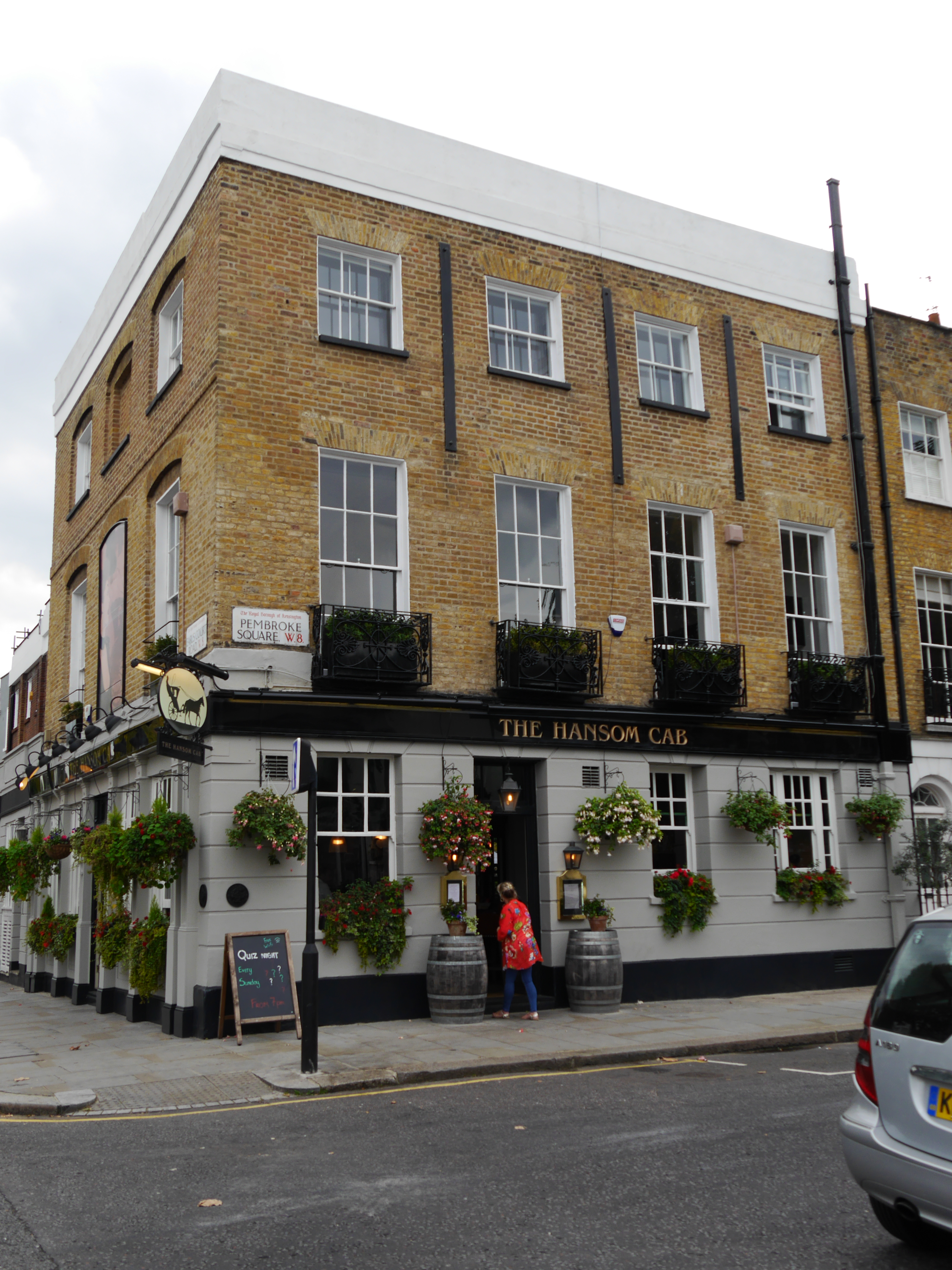
- The Hansom Cab

- Location within Royal Borough of Kensington and Chelsea Location within Greater London

General information
- Location: 84–86 Earls Court Road, Kensington, London W8 6EG, London, England
- Coordinates: 51.496437°N 0.197254°W

Design and construction
- Designations

Listed Building – Grade II
- Official name: The Hansom Cab Public House
- Designated: 15 April 1969
- Reference no.: 1225932

The Hansom Cab is a Grade II listed public house at 84–86 Earls Court Road, Kensington, London W8 6EG. It is on the corner with Pembroke Square.

A hansom cab is a kind of horse-drawn carriage, as illustrated on the pub's sign.
