= Bedlington Ironworks =

In Blyth Dene, Northumberland, England

- Location in Northumberland
- 55.122°N 1.586°W
- Location: Northumberland, England, UK
- OS grid reference: NZ265809

Bedlington Ironworks, in Blyth Dene, Northumberland, England, operated between 1736 and 1867. It is most remembered as the place where wrought iron rails were invented by John Birkinshaw in 1820, which triggered the railway age, with their first major use being in the Stockton and Darlington Railway opened in 1825, about 45 miles (72 km) to the south.

Blyth Dene, near Bedlington, was an idyllic location next to the River Blyth which had all the right ingredients for an ironworks at the time: there were nodules of ironstone in the coal-laden banks of the river, there was plenty of wood for the traditional approach of charcoal making, water for driving the hammers, and the port of Blyth was only two miles downriver for shipping of the products. At the time, a Shropshire man, Abraham Darby had started a revolution in ironmaking by using coke instead of charcoal. The Bedlington ironworks originally consisted of two elements – a mill in Bebside and a furnace at Bedlington Mill

== Bebside ==
A lease of 50 acres (20 ha) on the Bebside side of the river was taken in 1736 by William Thomlinson, an established ironmaster from Skinnerburn in Newcastle upon Tyne, though he died in 1737 before the works was properly established. By 1757, when it was sold again, there was a slitting mill which employed 40 nailers, a quay on the Bedlington side of the river and a "commodious dwelling house, fit for a gentleman's family consisting of ten fine rooms, four of which are hung with genteel papers, with good cellars, a stable, large garden and other conveniences". In 1782 (or 1792) the works, which by then were producing 500 long tons (510 t) of rod iron and iron hoops per year and exporting as far away as London. They introduced a rolling mill and the nailing business which had separated out steadily declined in importance.

== Bedlington ==
The ancient corn mill at Bedlington was taken over in 1759 by Malings & Co of Sunderland, who built a blast furnace for foundry work. However, they did not do well. Later there was a forge driven by a huge water wheel and a puddling furnace which needed the coal that was all around.

== The 19th century ==
By 1788, both works had passed to William Hawks (bapt. 1730 – d. 1810), brothers-in-law from Gateshead, who were both ironmasters. By 1809 the business had passed to Gordon and Biddulph, and by 1819 Michael Longridge, nephew of the previous co-owner, was in charge. One of his first acts was to make an agreement in 1819 with a coal mine at Choppington, 2 miles (3 km) away, for reduced prices on coal provided a wagonway was established to link the two works. Longridge, influenced by a report from Robert Stevenson of Edinburgh, decided on malleable iron rails and his agent John Birkinshaw developed a number of wedge-formed shapes to reduce the amount of iron, taking out a patent in 1820, and the rails were made with a swell or curvature in the middle.

The 2-mile (3 km) wagonway (which cost 15 shillings a yard or 16 shillings 4¾ pence a metre) was a great success and deeply impressed George Stephenson, a close friend of Longridge who went on to use Birkinshaw's invention in the Stockton and Darlington Railway and by 1822 the Bedlington Iron Company had delivered 1,200 long tons (1,200 t) of malleable iron rails to the venture. This level of production was far beyond that possible by the manual casting techniques used at the time and was an important factor in the success of the railways.

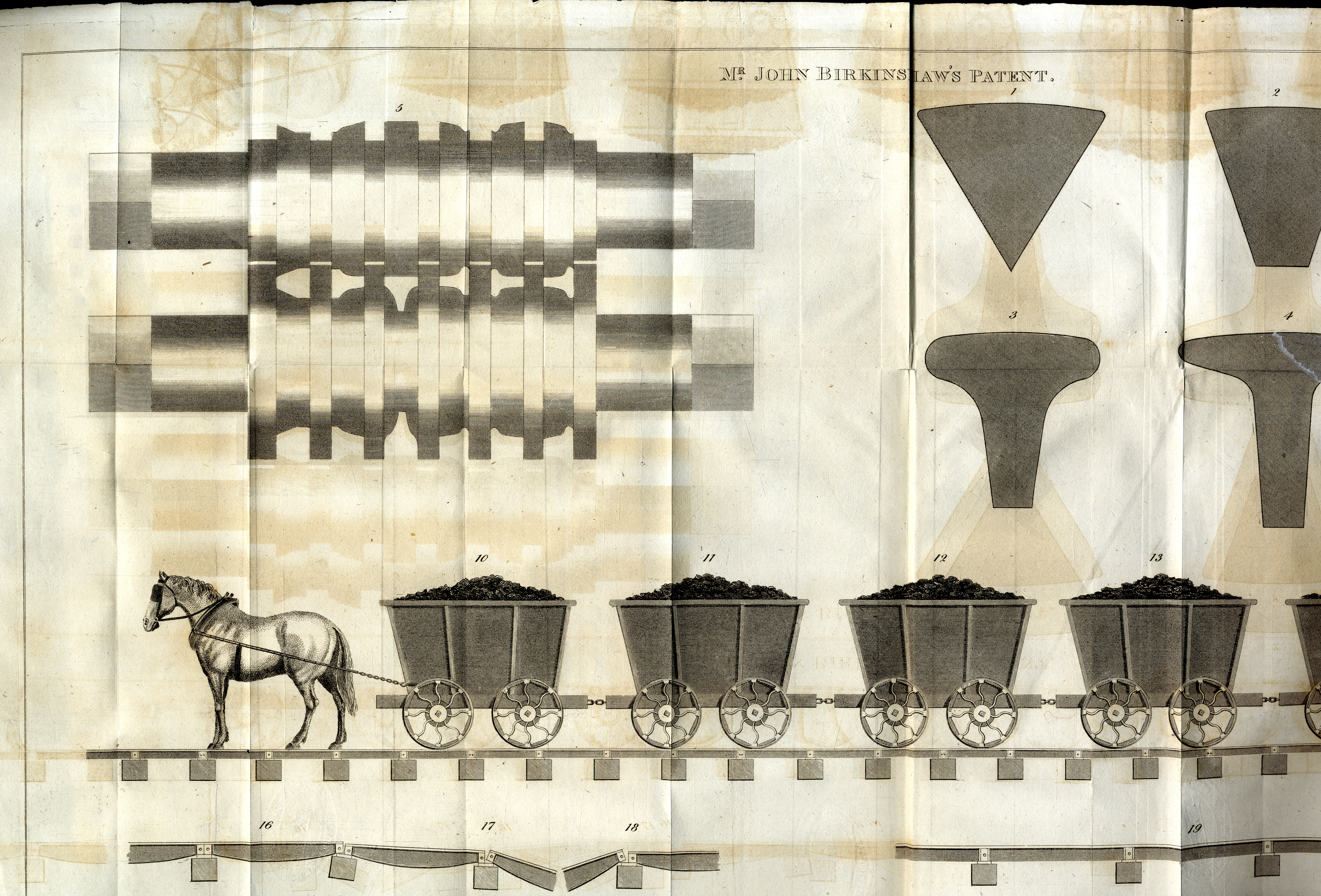
Drawing accompanying Birkinshaw's patent for Malleable Iron Rails in 1821.

By 1836, the ambitious Longridge was also making locomotives for the railways, despite the opposition of Robert Stephenson, George Stephenson's son, and the first locomotive, the "Michael Longridge", was delivered in 1837 to the Stanhope and Tyne Railway.

Though the locomotive plant closed in 1855, the Bedlington works exported both rails and locomotives to many parts of Europe and played a significant part in the explosive growth of the railway system. The works were at their peak in 1850 producing rails and castings for the Crimean War effort.

Longridge sold the works in 1853 and from there on it declined rapidly and was closed in 1867. The same year, Daniel Gooch, Isambard Kingdom Brunel's locomotive engineer on the Great Western Railway, who was brought up in Bedlington and spent his childhood playing around the works, found some rails on the GWR that had come from Bedlington still in very good order after 37 years of use.

== See also ==
- R. B. Longridge and Company
- Hawks family
