= R. B. Longridge and Company =

Early British locomotive manufacturer

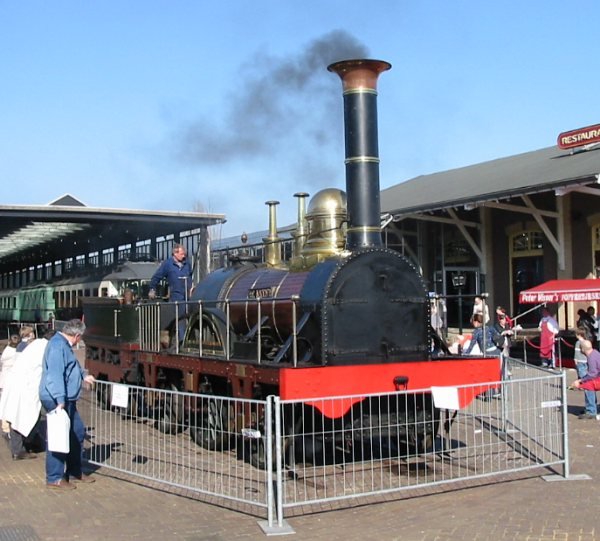
A 1939-built replica of the locomotive Arend. The original was built by R. B. Longridge and Company in about 1839

R. B. Longridge and Company was a steam locomotive works which was established in 1838 at Bedlington, Northumberland, England, by Michael Longridge (1785-1858). The firm was directed by Robert Bewick Longridge (1821-1914), who was Michael's fourth son. It was closely connected with the Bedlington Ironworks which had been bought between 1782 and 1788 (sources differ) by Thomas Longridge, (Michael's uncle) and William Hawks (bapt. 1730 – d. 1810) (Thomas's brother-in-law). The Bedlington Ironworks had been building locomotives since about 1827, but R. B. Longridge and Company was a new and up-to-date locomotive factory.

== Locomotives ==
The first locomotive was an 0-6-0 called Michael Longridge for the Stanhope and Tyne Railway. This was built in 1837 (the year before the company officially opened) so it was probably made by Bedlington Ironworks, rather than R. B. Longridge and Company.

It was followed by a number of 2-2-2 locomotives for several European railways, including De Arend the first locomotive to work on a public railway in the Netherlands, and Bayard for the kingdom of Naples. Some broad gauge singles – six members of the Firefly class – were also built in 1841 for Daniel Gooch of the Great Western Railway.

Business increased in 1846 with about sixty engines for the London and Birmingham Railway, the Midland Railway and the London, Brighton and South Coast Railway. While the export trade experienced a lull, orders continued to be fulfilled for the home railways, including ten 4-2-0 Crampton locomotives for the Great Northern Railway, which were later converted to 2-2-2s by Archibald Sturrock.

== Closure ==
The works closed in 1853. It has been estimated that it produced 209 locomotives between 1837 and 1852.
