= Hawks family =

Industrialist dynasty

Hawks
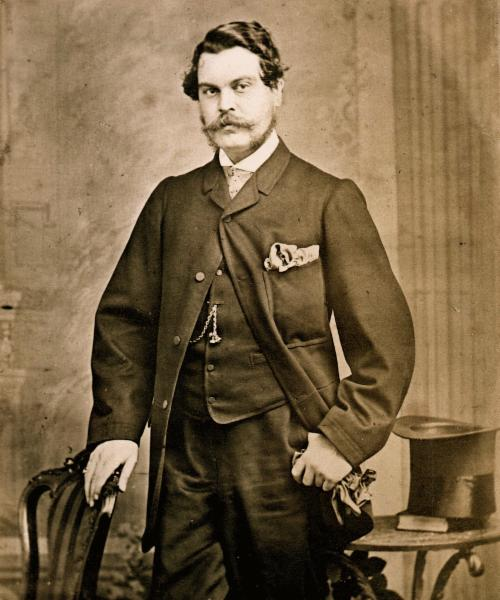
- Founded: 1740s
- Founder: William Hawks Senior (1708 – 1755)
- Historic seat: Redheugh Hall, Newcastle; Jesmond House, Newcastle; Clavering Place, Newcastle; Laverick Hall, Durham
- Members: Sir Robert Shafto Hawks (1768 - 1840); Joseph Stanley Hawks JP DL (1791–1873), Sheriff of Newcastle; George Hawks JP DL (1801–1863), Grand Master of the Grand Cross Chapter of Knights Templar (Freemasonry), and Mayor of Gateshead; Mary Susannah Hawks (1829 -1901), wife of Major-General Richard Clement Moody, Kt.; Colonel Richard Stanley Hawks Moody CB (1854 - 1930)
- Connected members: Thomas Longridge (by sibling's marriage); Major-General Richard Clement Moody, Kt. (by marriage); Edward Fenwick Boyd (by sibling's marriage)
- Connected families: Longridge; Gordon and Biddulph; Stanley; Boyd; Hutt; Moody; Knightley; Crawshay
- Estates: Beamish, County Durham (forge); Lumley, County Durham (forge); Bebside and Bedlington, River Blyth, Northumberland (mills); Hawks Cottages, Saltmeadows, Gateshead (workers' accommodation); New Greenwich, Gateshead (ironworks); New Deptford, Gateshead; New Woolwich, Gateshead; Pembroke Square, Kensington
- One of the most influential industrialist dynasties of the British Industrial Revolution, who owned iron manufacture and engineering companies in Northern England and in the City of London that employed over 2000 people and that exported worldwide using their own ships.

The Hawks family was one of the most influential industrialist dynasties of the British Industrial Revolution. They owned several iron-manufacture and engineering companies in Northern England and in the City of London (including Hawks and Co.; Hawks, Crawshay, and Stanley; and Hawks, Crawshay and Sons) all of which had the name Hawks in the company name, and exported worldwide using their own ships.

The Hawks reached the apogee of their success during the Victorian period, when they employed over 2000 people and their reputation was global. Their Gateshead factories were termed New Deptford and New Woolwich after the location of two of their warehouses on the River Thames. The company built the High Level Bridge across the River Tyne; and bridges worldwide including in Constantinople and India; and lighthouses in France; and ironclad warships and materials for the Royal Navy during the Napoleonic Wars; and contracts for the East India Company. They produced the first iron boat, the Vulcan, in 1821.

They were also involved in merchant banking, and in freemasonry, and in Whig free trade politics. They developed areas of West London, including Pembroke Square, Kensington.

Leading members included Sir Robert Shafto Hawks (1768–1840) who was their representative in London; Joseph Stanley Hawks JP DL (1791–1873), Sheriff of Newcastle; George Hawks (1801–1863), Grand Master of the Grand Cross Chapter of the Holy Temple of Jerusalem (Knights Templar) and Mayor of Gateshead; Mary Susannah Hawks (1829 -1901), the wife of Richard Clement Moody who was the founder of British Columbia; and Colonel Richard Stanley Hawks Moody CB (1854–1930), a distinguished British Army officer and historian.

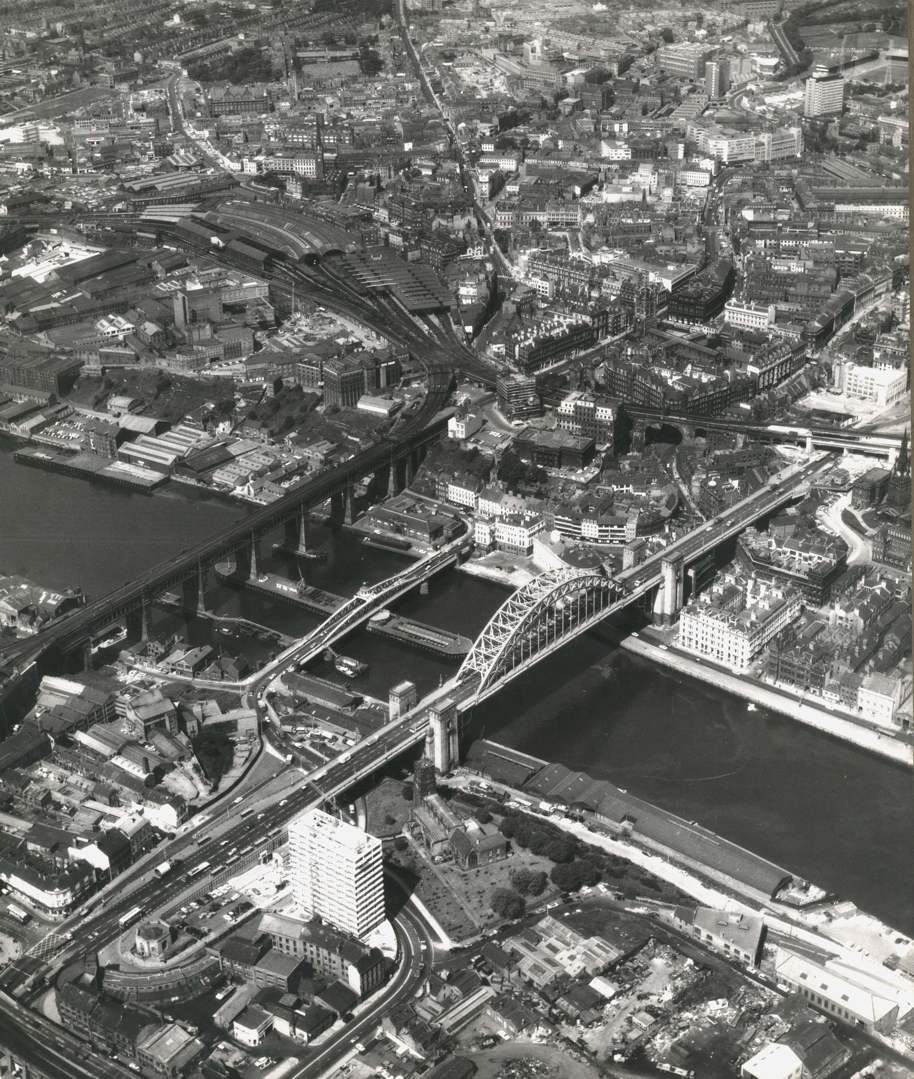
The High Level Bridge, River Tyne, (on the left) that was built by the Hawks dynasty

== Companies ==
The first Hawks company was established by William Hawks Senior (1708 – 1755) who was a foreman-smith at the iron-manufactory that had been established by Sir Ambrose Crowley (1658 - 1713) at Swalwell. He during the late 1740s established, along the ground of the river at Gateshead, a set of workshops that, when he died (at Gateshead on 23 February 1755), were inherited by his eldest son, William Hawks Junior (bapt. 1730 – d. 1810), who, with his first wife, Elizabeth Dixon, established the Hawks's industrial empire.

William Junior (d. 1810) in 1770 partnered with his brother-in-law Thomas Longridge (bapt. 1751 - d. 1803) to acquire a plating forge at Beamish, County Durham, which was the first of four separate metalworking-sites that were operated by Hawks and Longridge along Beamish Burn. In the 1780s, a forge at Lumley, in County Durham, and slitting and rolling mills, on the River Blyth, were acquired by the company.

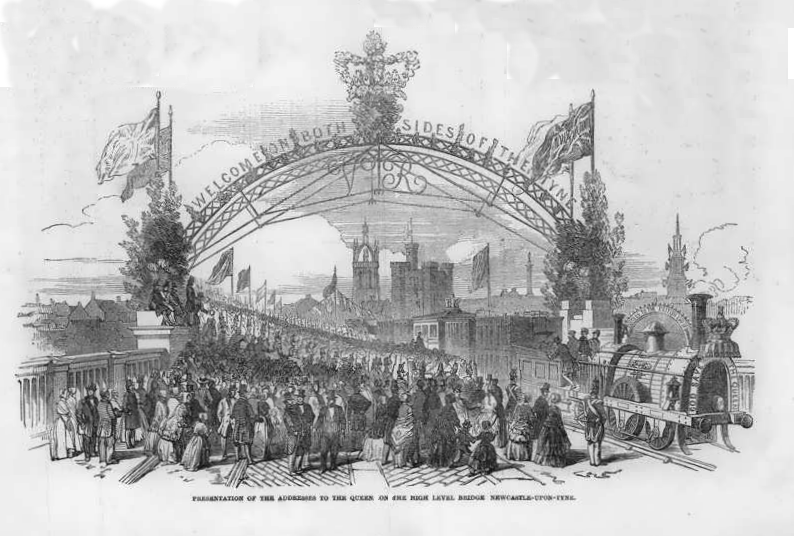
The inauguration of the High Level Bridge by Queen Victoria on 28 September 1849

By 1790, the works at Gateshead produced steel, anchors, heavy chains, steam-engine components, and a diversity of iron-wares, that were supplied to the Board of Admiralty and were transported by the Gordon and Stanley families, the latter of whom were associated with the ordnance industry of the Weald and with the dockyards of the River Thames and of the Medway. The Hawks also owned the Bedlington Ironworks during this period.

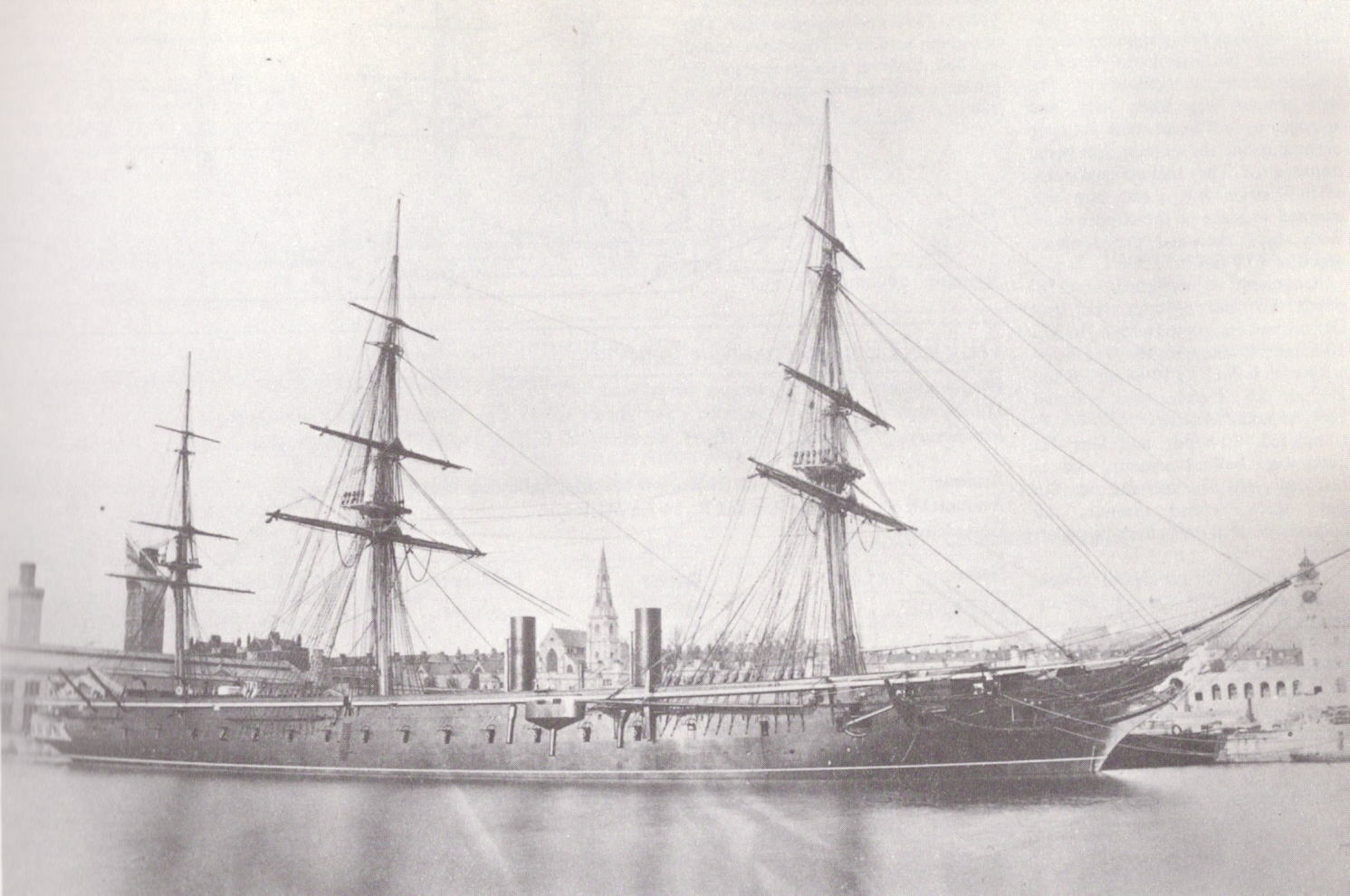
The Hawks company produced numerous ironclad warships (including HMS Warrior, which was the first armour-plated, iron-hulled warship) for the Royal Navy and for the East India Company.

William Junior (d. 1810) in 1809 married for a second time to Elizabeth (d. 1831), who was the widow of Joseph Atkinson. On 4 December 1810, his share, which was worth 'under 30,000' (about £1.4 million in 21st-century money), was inherited by his surviving sons: George Hawks (1766 – 1820) of Blackheath, London, and Sir Robert Shafto Hawks (1768 – 1840), and John Hawks (1770 – 1830) of Tavistock Square.

The Hawks built Hawks Cottages in the 1830s in the Saltmeadows district of Gateshead for its workers.

The Hawks' factories covered 44 acres by 1840 and employed between 800 and 900 people. At the time of the visit of the British Association to Newcastle in 1863, it employed 1500 people, and owned 92 marine-engines and 58 land-engines, which together provided 5000 horsepower, and 33 puddling furnaces. The poet Joseph Skipsey worked for the Hawks' Gateshead ironworks, from 1859 to 1863, until one of his children was killed in an accident at the works in 1863. The job was obtained for Skipsey by the James Thomas Clephan, who was the editor of the Whig sympathetic Gateshead Observer.

The Hawks' works at Gateshead was Newcastle's largest employer until its closure when Hawks, Crawshay, and Sons was liquidated in 1889.

== Specific Products ==
=== The Vulcan ===
The first iron-boat to be built, which was a rowing boat that was named the Vulcan, was built, in 1821, at the Hawks's ironworks. When Sir Robert Shafto Hawks was informed of the purpose for which Samuel Tyne, the boat's inventor, had purchased iron from the Hawks company, he proffered for free the iron that was required. Sir Robert arranged for cannons to be fired at the launch of the boat, which subsequently won races against wooden boats of the same capacity. However, on Ascension Day, 1826, when, laden with 12 persons, a boat that accompanied the Mayor's barge was hit by a steam-vessel, two of the Vulcan's rowers were killed, and the Vulcan was abandoned.

=== Products ===
The Hawks company during about 1842 erected a cast-iron bridge at York, which spans the river Ouse in one arch of 172 feet in width. The company also reconstructed the Rowland Burdon iron-bridge at Sunderland, County Durham, which consists of a single arch of a width of 237 feet. The company also constructed the wrought-iron gates for the Northumberland Docks; and the iron-lighthouses at Gunfleet, and at Harwich, and at Calais; and the iron pier at Madras. The company also built bridges in Constantinople. Sir Robert Shafto Hawks financed the construction of St John's Church, Gateshead Fell. The company built the High Level Bridge over the Tyne, which consisted of 5050 tons of iron, of which George Hawks drove in the last key on 7 June 1849, and which Queen Victoria opened later that year.

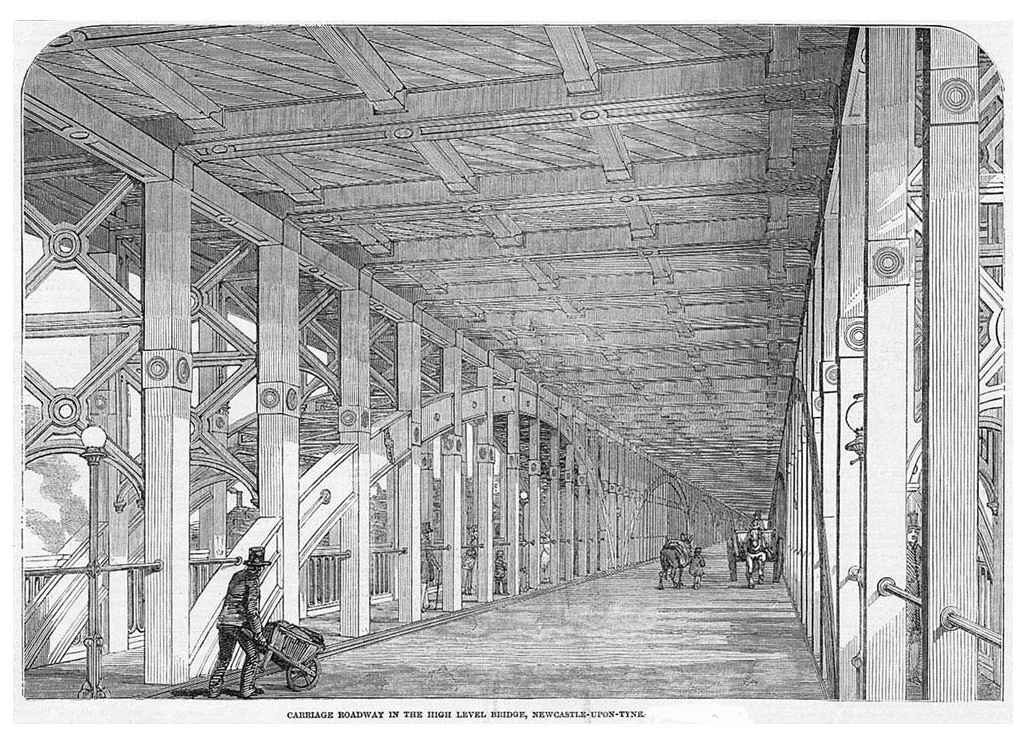
The carriageway level of the High Level Bridge

The company produced ironclad warships and other materials for the Royal Navy during the Napoleonic Wars, and large contracts for the East India Company, and paddle steamers and hydraulic dredgers for use within Britain.

=== Property ===
The Hawks family developed also developed areas of London, including Pembroke Square, Kensington.

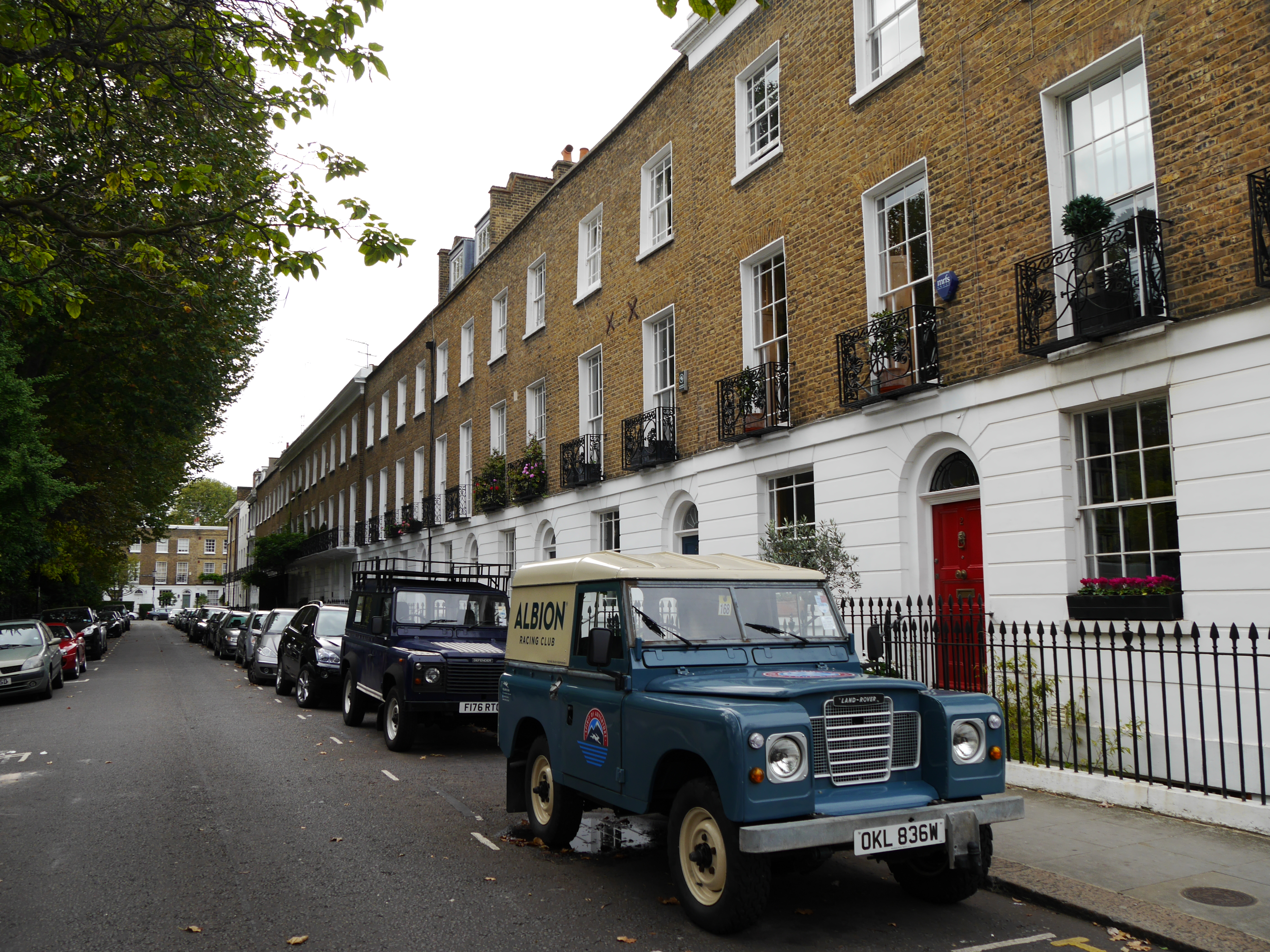
Pembroke Square, Kensington was developed by the Hawks dynasty

== Notable members ==
=== Sir Robert Shafto Hawks (1768–1840) ===
The armigerous Robert Shafto Hawks was the Hawks' companies' representative in London and became their director subsequent to the death of his father, of whom he was the eldest surviving son, in 1810. He was knighted by the Prince Regent, in 1817, for his dissipation of riots. He was involved in freemasonry in which he served as Worshipful Master of the oldest lodge in Northumberland.

He in 1790 married Hannah Pembroke Akenhead (1766–1863) by whom he had two sons. Their eldest son, The Rev. William, who received an L. L. B. degree from Trinity Hall, Cambridge, was the Vicar of St John's Church, Gateshead Fell, at the vicarage of which, Hawksbury House, which his father built, he lived.

Sir Robert's younger son, David Shafto, who was blind, was a musical prodigy who when aged 9 years composed marches for military bands, and composed Tyrolean, and Scottish, and Welsh airs. He was said to have 'a most amazing proof of musical genius and early proficiency' when he was 17 years of age, and to be a 'true musical genius'.

He died at 4 Clavering Place, Newcastle. There is a memorial to him, to his wife, and to his son The Rev. William and to his grandson David Shafto, at St Nicholas' Newcastle Cathedral. His portrait is in Shipley Art Gallery.

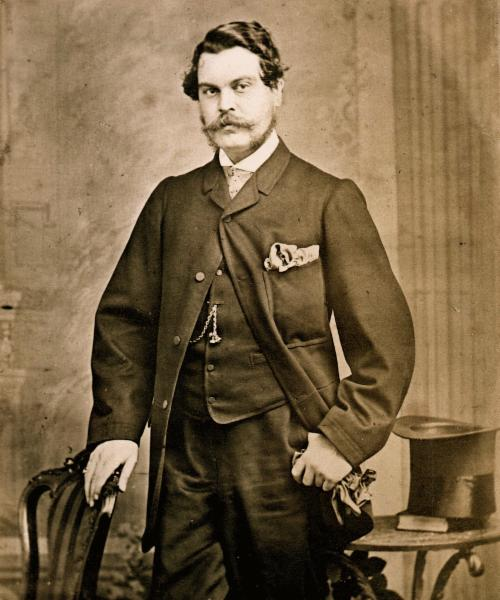
George Hawks (1801 - 1863), JP DL, Grand Master of the Grand Cross Chapter of Knights Templar (Freemasonry), and Mayor of Gateshead

=== George Hawks (1801–1863) ===
Sir Robert's nephew George Hawks (1801 – 1863), JP DL, of Redheugh Hall, who was the armigerous eldest son of John Hawks (1770 – 1830), of Tavistock Square, and Elizabeth Longridge, succeeded his uncle Sir Robert as director of the Hawks company. George Hawks was a supporter of Sir William Hutt MP, who was MP for Gateshead from 1841, and who campaigned to have George Hawks knighted. Redheugh Hall was one of the centres of Whiggism in the north-east of England. George Hawks served as the first Mayor of Gateshead in 1836, and, subsequently, in the same office again in 1848 and in 1849.

George Hawks was extensively involved in freemasonry, in which he served as Grand Master of the Grand Cross Chapter of the Holy Temple of Jerusalem (Knights Templar), and as Deputy and Provincial Grand Steward of the Provincial Grand Lodge of Northumberland (of which his relation Clement Moody, Vicar of Newcastle, was a member), and as Past Master of the Lodge of Newcastle upon Tyne, and as member of Borough Lodge No. 614, and as a Full Affiliated Member of The Celtic Lodge of Edinburgh and Leith No. 291. Hawks, who had been made a freemason in Guernsey, was described as 'an excellent mason'.

There is a statue of George Hawks (1801 – 1863) at Gateshead that was erected by public subscription in 1865.

=== Edward Hawks (1814 - 1895) and Jane Diana Hawks (b. 1839) ===
A younger son of John Hawks (1770 – 1830) was Edward Hawks (1814 – 1895), of Douglas, Isle of Man, who married Mary Anne Knightley, who was the daughter of The Rev. Henry Knightley (1786 - 1813). The Knightley family descended from the House of Plantagenet on several lines, including from Henry Pole, 1st Baron Montagu and through Valentine Knightley of Fawsley MP (1718 - 1754). Their daughter was Jane Diana Hawks (b. 1839) who married William Boyd (b. 1839) JP who was the eldest son of The Ven. William Boyd (1809 - 1893), of University College, Oxford, who was Archdeacon of Craven and Honorary Canon of Ripon from 1860, and the elder brother of The Ven. Charles Twining Boyd, Archdeacon of Columbo.

=== Joseph Stanley Hawks (1791–1873) ===
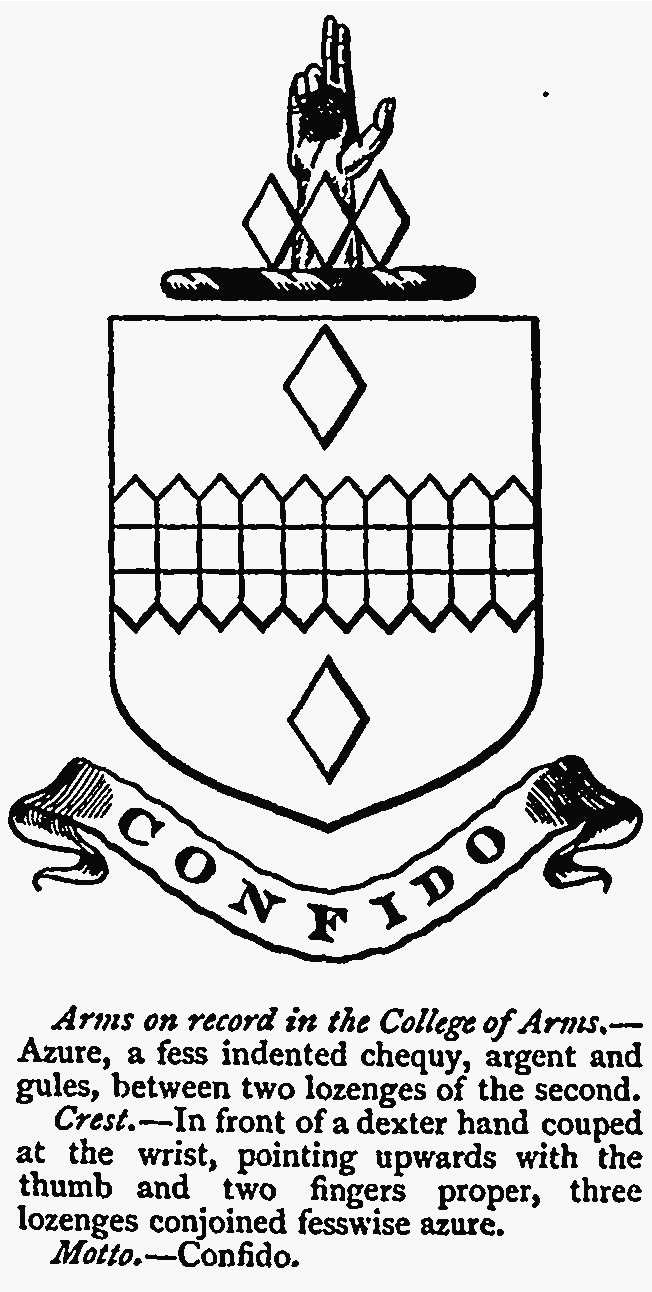
The coat-of-arms of Mary Susannah Hawks (1829 - 1901)'s mother Mary Elizabeth Boyd (d. 1884)

Joseph Stanley Hawks JP DL (1791 - 1873), of Jesmond House, Gateshead, Newcastle upon Tyne, and later of Cheltenham, was the son of George Hawks of Blackheath, London, (1766 - 1820), who was the brother of Sir Robert Shafto Hawks. Joseph Stanley Hawks was a merchant banker who served as Sheriff of Newcastle.

A biography of Joseph Stanley Hawks can be found in Nigel Tattersfield: 'Bookplates by Beilby & Bewick', The British Library and Oak Knoll Press, 1999, pp. 136–137.

He married the armiger Mary Elizabeth Boyd (d. 1884), who was the daughter of William Boyd Junior of the Boyd merchant banking family, which had founded the Bank of Newcastle, and who was the sister of the industrialist Edward Fenwick Boyd and of The Ven. William Boyd (1809 - 1893), of University College, Oxford, who was Archdeacon of Craven and Honorary Canon of Ripon from 1860, through whom her nephew was The Ven. Charles Twining Boyd, Archdeacon of Columbo. Through her great-grandfather Edward Fenwick, Vicar of Kirkwhelpington, Mary Elizabeth Boyd was a descendant on multiple lines of Edward III, and a descendant of Sir Thomas Liddell, 1st Baronet and of Sir William Chaytor of Croft.

Mary Elizabeth Boyd was also a descendant of Sir Hamon de Clervaulx [sic] who had accompanied William the Conqueror from Normandy to the Battle of Hastings of 1066, after whom her grandson Henry de Clervaux Moody (1864 – 1900), who was killed in the Second Boer War, was named.

Joseph Stanley Hawks died at Cheltenham on 7 November 1873, and his widow died at Cheltenham on 7 November 1884. Both are commemorated by a plaque at The Church of St. Thomas the Martyr, Barras Bridge, Newcastle.

=== Mary Susannah Hawks (later Moody) (1829–1901) ===
Joseph Stanley Hawks and Mary Elizabeth Boyd's daughter, Mary Susannah Hawks, married Major-General Richard Clement Moody, who was the founder of British Columbia, by whom her children included Colonel Richard Stanley Hawks Moody (b. 1854), Captain Henry de Clervaux Moody (b. 1864), and Major George Robert Boyd Moody (b. 1868); and her grandchildren included Major Richard Charles Lowndes MC (b. 1888), and the ethnographer of Aboriginal Australia and Stonehenge archaeologist Robert Stanley Newall (b. 1884). Mary Susannah Hawks died in 1901.

Richard Clement Moody named the 400-foot hill in Port Coquitlam, "Mary Hill", after his wife Mary Susannah. The Royal British Columbia Museum possesses a trove of 42 letters that were written by Mary Susannah Moody (née Hawks) from the Colony of British Columbia (1858–66) to her mother and to her sisters, Juliana Stanley Hawks (d. 1868) and Emily Stanley Hawks (d. 1865), who were in England, that have been of interest to scholars of the ruling class of the British Empire.

=== Richard Stanley Hawks Moody (1854–1930) ===
Colonel Richard Stanley Hawks Moody CB was a distinguished British Army officer, and historian, and Military Knight of Windsor.

== Decline ==
Hannah, Lady Hawks (d. 1863), who was the widow of Sir Robert Shafto Hawks, and her two sons, sold their third of the company, in 1840, to George Crawshay, who was a member of a prominent ironmaking family of South Wales. The business of William Hawks Junior had been divided between his three eldest surviving sons in 1810. George Crawshay obtained a second third of the company when he acquired the shares of Joseph Stanley Hawks, who was the only surviving son of George Hawks of Blackheath (1766 - 1820).

The Bedlington ironworks were subsequently inherited by a cousin of the Hawks, Michael Longridge (1785 – 1853), who was a pioneer of railway technology, and who was an associate of Robert Stephenson, under whose superintendence was trained a generation of engineers including Sir Daniel Gooch, 1st Baronet.

The manager of Hawks, Crawshay and Sons during its last years was George Crawshay (1821 – 1896), who was the son of the elder George Crawshay. Like George Hawks, George Crawshay became sociopolitically influential, but, unlike George Hawks, his management of the Hawks' company was incompetent: Crawshay failed to modernize the company, from manufacture of diverse products by diverse processes, to enable its successful competition with specialist companies, such as those owned by William Armstrong, 1st Baron Armstrong, and by the nail manufacturer William Galloway, both of whose profits increased as those of Hawks and Crawshay declined until it was liquidated in 1889, when all of its creditors were fully recompensed.
