= Edward Fenwick Boyd =

English industrialist

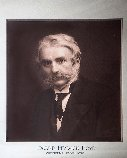
- Edward Fenwick Boyd
- Born: 30 August 1810; Moor House, Leamside, County Durham, England
- Died: 31 August 1889 (aged 79); Durham, England
- Education: University of Edinburgh
- Occupation: Mining industrialist
- Spouse: Ann Anderson
- Children: Juliana Boyd; George Fenwick Boyd; Robert Fenwick Boyd; and Hugh Fenwick Boyd
- Parent(s): William Boyd Junior (1773 - 1855), Esther Locke
- Relatives: Joseph Stanley Hawks JP DL, Sheriff of Newcastle (brother-in-law); The Ven. William Boyd (1809 - 1893) (brother); The Ven. Charles Twining Boyd (nephew); Janet Boyd, suffragette (daughter-in-law); Lieutenant Edward Fenwick Boyd (1890 - 1914) (grandson); Captain Hugh Lennox Fleming Boyd (1891 - 1917) (grandson).

Edward Fenwick Boyd (30 August 1810 – 31 August 1889) was an English mining industrialist, of the armigerous Boyd banking family of County Durham, who from 1869 served as the fourth President of the North of England Institute of Mining and Mechanical Engineers (NEIMME), as which he oversaw the opening of the Nicholas Wood Memorial Hall and the Newcastle College of Physical Science.

== Family ==
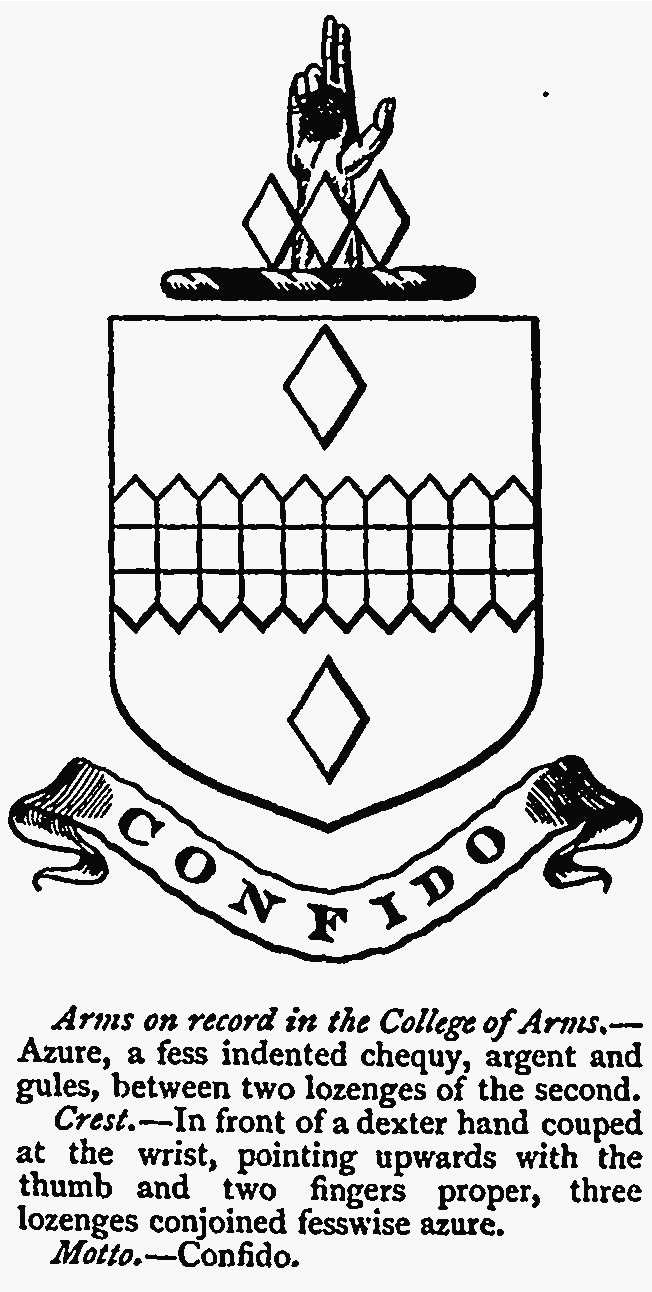
The coat-of-arms of Boyd of Moor House, County Durham

Edward Fenwick Boyd was born on 30 August 1810 at Moor House, Leamside, Durham. He was the third son of the armigerous banker William Boyd Junior (1773 - 1855), of Newcastle upon Tyne and Burfield Priory, Gloucester, who was a partner in the Newcastle Old Bank, and Esther (née Locke) Boyd (1777 - 1818).

His paternal grandparents were William Boyd Senior and Juliana Peat of Cumberland and Newcastle upon Tyne.

His brother was The Ven. William Boyd (1809 - 1893), of University College, Oxford, who was Archdeacon of Craven and Honorary Canon of Ripon from 1860, through whom his nephew was The Ven. Charles Twining Boyd. His sister Mary Elizabeth married Joseph Stanley Hawks JP DL, Sheriff of Newcastle.

== Early life ==
He was educated by Henry Atkinson at the High Bridge before he from 1821 attended Witton-le-Wear Grammar School for five years, during which he had a talent for art. He subsequently worked at Cocken White House Pit, and then at Bowes’ House Pit where he met Thomas Crawford, who was the manager of Lord Durham’s extensive collieries. Boyd subsequently, between October 1830 and May 1831, attended Edinburgh University whilst he maintained a connection with the mining industry at Towneley Main Colliery. He subsequent to his return from Edinburgh University accompanied Matthias Dunn, who was a mine inspector, on visitations to various collieries in Scotland including Prestongrange, Kilmarnock, Middleton and Dalmellington in Ayrshire.

Boyd obtained from Dunn his first appointment as underviewer and surveyor at Hetton-le-Hole Colliery in 1832. Boyd in 1837 moved to Urpeth to become resident viewer of Urpeth Colliery, and also became mineral agent to the Dean and Chapter of Durham, and manager of Wylam Colliery on behalf of the Blackett family.

== Issue ==
In 1841 he married Ann, daughter of George Anderson, with whom he had four children:

- Juliana (b. 1846).
- George Fenwick (1849 - 1909), of University College, Oxford, who was High Sheriff of Durham, who married the suffragette Janet Boyd.
- Robert Fenwick (b. 1851) of Rugby School, through whom he was the grandfather of Lieutenant Edward Fenwick Boyd (1890 - 1914). Lieutenant Edward Fenwick Boyd (1890 - 1914), of the 1st Battalion of the 5th Foot/Northumberland Fusiliers, was educated at Rugby School and University College, Oxford, where he was a master mason of Apollo University Lodge No. 357 and of the Vincent's Club. He was killed in action on 20 September 1914, at Vailly-sur-Aisne during the First Battle of the Aisne, for which he was mentioned in dispatches on 19 October 1914. He is buried at Vailly British Cemetery, France, and commemorated by a memorial at St. Mary the Virgin Church, West Rainton, Leamside.
- Hugh Fenwick QC (b. 1852), of Marlborough College and Brasenose College, Oxford, and Inner Temple, of 13 Evelyn Gardens, South Kensington, through whom he was the grandfather of Captain Hugh Lennox Fleming Boyd (1891 - 1917). Captain Hugh Lennox Fleming Boyd (1891 - 1917), of the 1st Battalion the Black Watch/Royal Highlanders, was educated at Marlborough College and New College, Oxford. He was killed in action at Passchendaele on 18 November 1917, who is buried at Poelcapple British Cemetery and also is commemorated by a memorial at St. Mary the Virgin Church, West Rainton, Leamside.

== Early Bankruptcy ==
In 1856 Boyd bought the estate of Moor House where he built his family a house. He resigned his position as manager of the Urpeth Colliery and was 'proposing to take life somewhat more easily' until the failure of the Northumberland and Durham District Bank during the financial crisis of 1857 reduced his inheritance from his father and his private savings to the extent to which he could not without a job educate his children. Therefore, in 1858, he became Chief Mining Engineer of the Consett Iron Company and until 1872 he superintended the working of their collieries.

== Formation of the North of England Institute of Mining and Mechanical Engineers ==
Disasters such as the explosion at St Hilda’s Colliery in 1839 brought about an awareness amongst miners and men working within this community of the need for a society to formalise rules within the mining community to prevent such disasters. As a result, the South Shields Committee recommended the introduction of the compulsory registration of mine plans, a system of government inspections, the prohibiting of the employment of women and children below ground and the need for a better scientific education of the Mining Engineers. However, it was not until 1850 that legislation was passed requiring collieries to appoint inspectors. Mine plans were expected to be kept and produced and all fatal accidents were to now be reported to the Home Office.

Similar to the disaster at St Hilda’s, an explosion at Seaton Colliery on 9 June 1852 acted as a catalyst for the founding of the NEIMME. Leading figures such as Nicholas Wood, T.E. Forster, Sir George Elliot, 1st Baronet and Edward Sinclair (all of which were present at the inquest of the Seaton explosion) joined forty four coal owners and subsequently founded ‘The North of England Society for the Prevention of Accidents and for other Purposes Connected with Mining’. At a second meeting the society changed its name to the more pointed ‘The North of England Institute of Mining Engineers’ and it was not until 1870 when it opened its doors to Engineers that its title was adapted again to ‘The North of England Institute of Mining & Mechanical Engineers’. The aims of the society ultimately were to search for the causes of mining accidents exemplified at Seaton and St. Hilda’s, improve the ventilation of mines and to generally improve the safety and conditions of mines.

Boyd played a significant role in the foundation of the North of England Institute of Mining and Mechanical Engineers and his reliability led to his appointment as Treasurer from the inauguration of the NEIMME until 1869. In addition to this role, Boyd worked closely alongside the first President, Nicholas Wood, in his efforts towards creating a schooling system for Mining Engineers as well as projects such as ‘On a "wash" or "drift" through a portion of the coal- field of Durham’ which they presented to the members of the Mining Institute in December 1863. His dedication and hard working ethic resulted in his election as the fourth President of the NEIMME in 1869 following that of George Elliot. During his time in office he worked excessively on the opening of the Nicholas Wood Memorial Hall, which was to become the home of the Mining Institute, and pursued the work of Nicholas Wood in the foundation of the College of Physical College.

== College of Physical Science ==
The foundation of the College of Physical Science in 1871, the fore-runner of Newcastle University, is considered to be one of Boyd’s most significant achievements during his presidency. Schooling was a hot topic amongst the leading members since the founding of the NEIMME and the formation of a college was desired by Nicholas Wood himself. It was believed by many that schooling was essential for men in this field as no other branch of engineering required such diversified training and practise as that of a Mining Engineer. With mines being sunk deeper, mining was growing increasingly more difficult and dangerous therefore the education and professionalization of this role was deemed to be more essential. Nicholas Wood drew up an outline for a possible course lasting three years, intending for it to be purely practical and industrial in character. It was hoped that the college would be independent, however due to costs this was not feasible, hence it was decided that the College of Mining and Engineering was to be located at Durham in connection with Durham University.

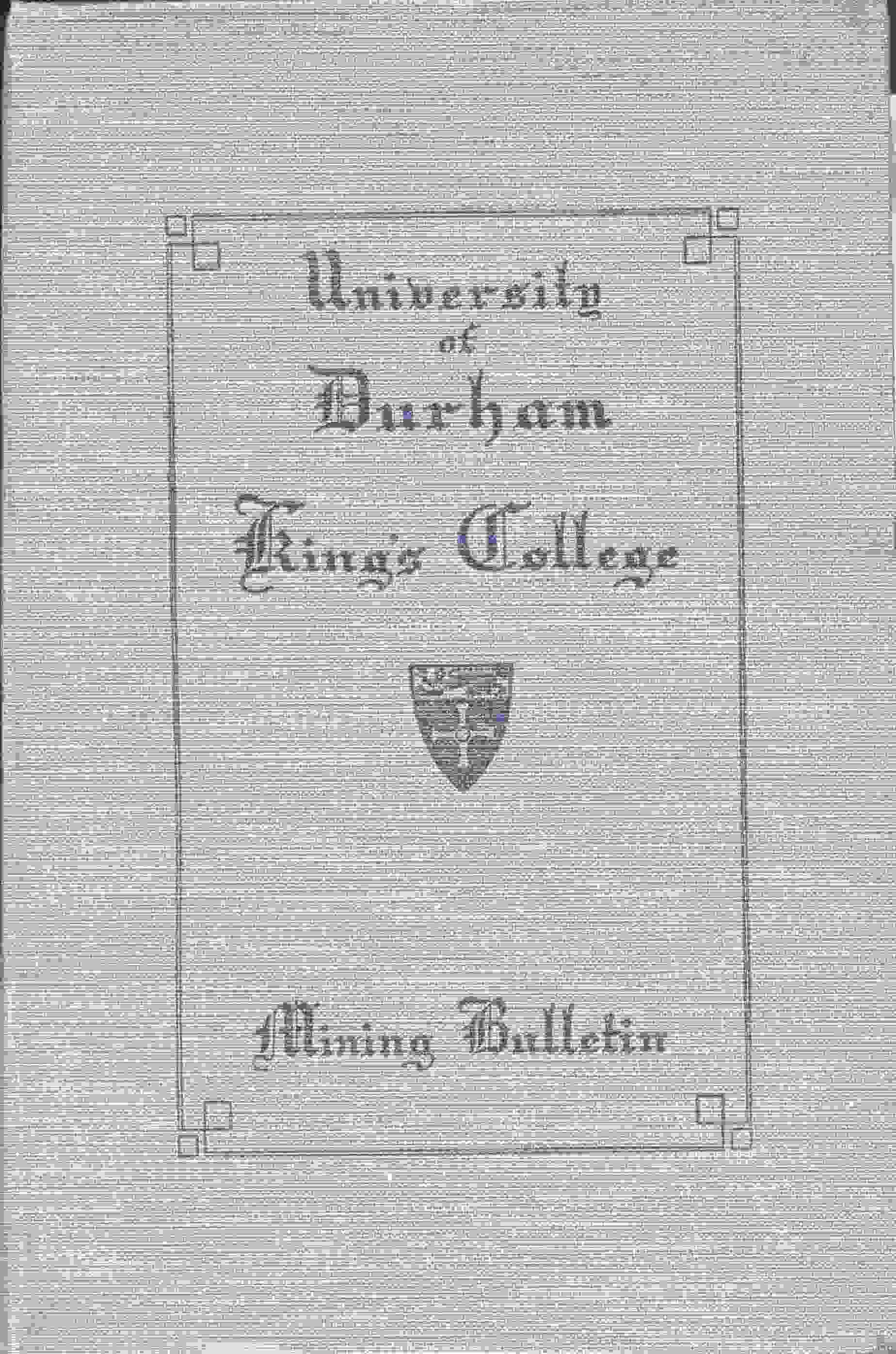
University of Durham King's College Mining Bulletin

The University would provide and pay two professors; one of mathematics and natural philosophy and the other of applied mechanics, on the grounds that their service would be useful to both institutions. The College itself was required to provide three more; professors of Chemistry, Geology and Mine Working and Surveying and plan-drawing and Practical Engineering. With such constraints, the Miners were required to raise money for both the building and the salaries of the remaining professors. This attempt was disappointing and ultimately led to the temporary abandonment of the project.

After the death of Nicholas Wood, the subsequent two presidents, T.E. Forster and George Elliot, made little effort to revive the project and it was not until the appointment of Edward Fenwick Boyd that the project was resurrected. He championed the importance of education and argued that workmen needed to be well directed. It was believed that managers would provide encouragement and direction, bring about punctuality, self-reliance, obedience and education,. He brought in a new initiative and successfully developed a connection with the Dean of Durham University. Boyd had been involved in the early talks regarding the formation of a College but he believed these were unsuccessful and unproductive due to a number of reasons, the most significant being the disagreements regarding the location of the College and the problems surrounding funding.

Fortunately, Boyd’s presidency fell during a period of flourishing trade in the district in which there was a strong demand for young men of ability and energy to manage the industries of the area. With a growth in prosperity and a demand for training in such industries, Boyd was led to believe that the community would be more forthcoming, economically and socially, with supporting the foundation of the college. Boyd believed education would ‘elevate the general tone of the community, and conduce to the honour and prosperity of the nation, and enable it to develop the vast industrial advantages which it possesses’.

With the appointment of the new Dean at Durham University, William Lake (Dean of Durham), Boyd, with help from Lowthian Bell, again attempted to lay a case for the College to be based in Newcastle upon Tyne. A committee was finally appointed on 9 November 1869 by the Mining Institute to confer with the Principals of Durham University. Many private discussions took place between Lake, Boyd and Lowthian Bell and a basic agreement was reached. A public meeting held in Newcastle on 25 March 1871 acted as the backdrop for the proposals from the Committee. Lake proposed that the University of Durham were to give £1000 per annum for six years towards the expenses of establishing a College at Newcastle, provided that a similar sum for the like term could be guaranteed from other sources.

The offer was accepted and advanced by the promise that aid would be made permanent if a sum to ensure the continuance of the support could be obtained. As previously stated, with the more prosperous nature of society, it was decided by the committee to appeal to the public for £30,000 with the desire that the College should be opened at its earliest opportunity, October 1871. In its first year of teaching the College had eight teaching staff, one hundred and seventy three students and offered instruction in four subjects; Mathematics, Physics, Chemistry and Geology, all of which expanded in the subsequent years.

Although it offered a wide variety of subjects, the College upon its opening did not offer Mining Engineering as an individual subject as it believed it could not be taught in the classroom but that practical experience was as vital as a good general and scientific education. Numerous influential figures commented on the importance of the education of a Mining Engineer and the advantages of Physical Science upon the opening of the College. The Dean of Durham commented on these advantages in a speech to the Institute regarding the inauguration of the Newcastle College of Physical Science expressing that the teaching of Physical Science trains to observe and inquire, shorten the gap between ideas and actual facts about nature and it also has a direct bearing on the business life. A student of such a discipline is trained to those rules of induction, of experiment and of verification and it gives a large knowledge of the immense world of material truth which nature can reveal.

Likewise, Professor John Young of the University of Glasgow commented on the education of a Mining Engineer as ‘one whom is credited sufficient knowledge of the conditions under which minerals occur in the earth and render him a reliable advisor, know the qualities of mineral so as to decide on the worth of any that maybe found, sufficient mechanical skills to conduct all the operations connected with the extraction of the mineral from the earth. They should be a Geologist and a Mineralogist as well as a Civil Engineer’ hence, the addition of Mining Engineering to the syllabus.

== Opening of the Nicholas Wood Memorial Hall ==
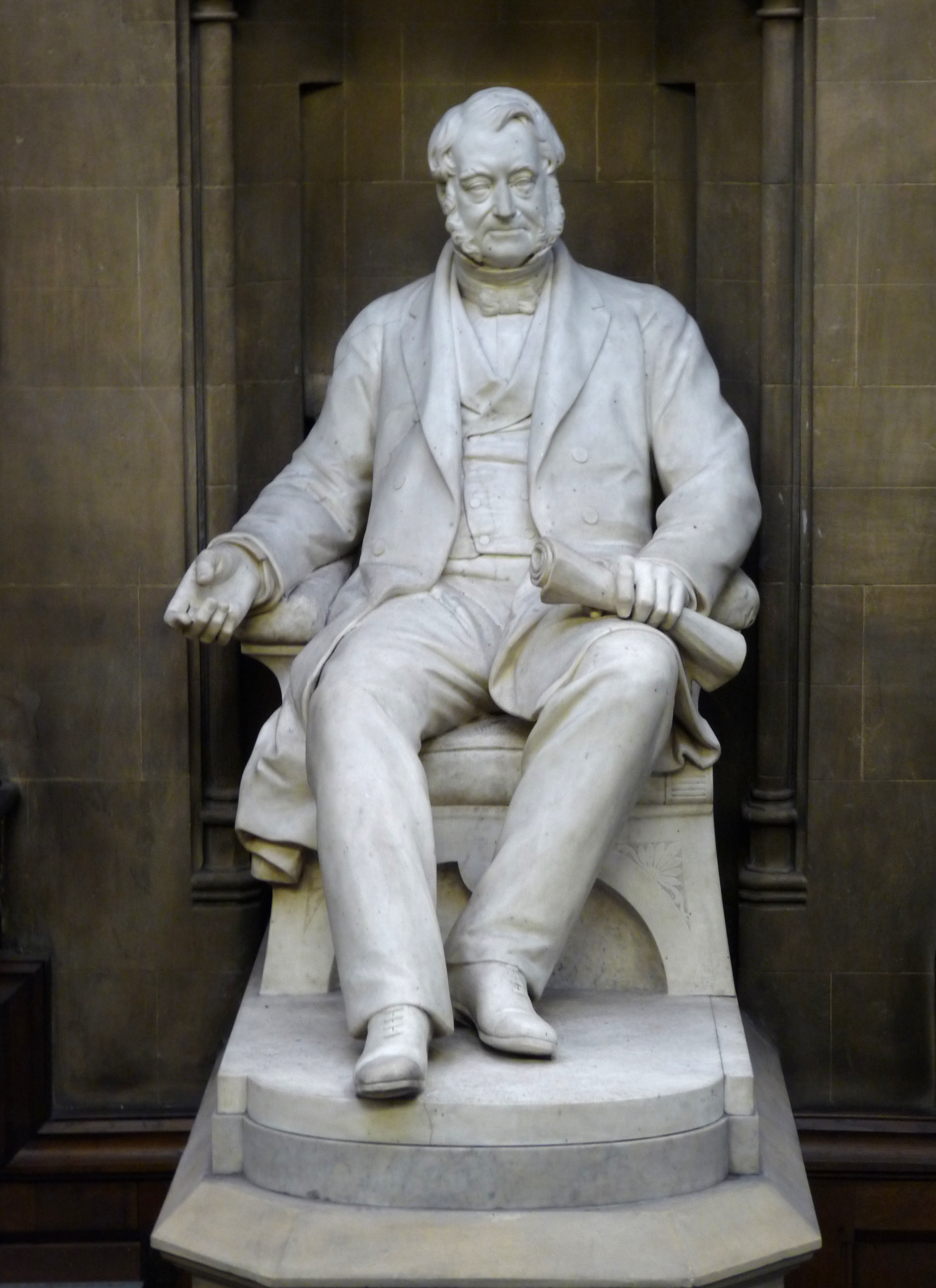
The statue to Nicolas Wood

Alongside the opening of the College of Physical Science, Boyd’s presidency was also recognised for his involvement in the opening of the Nicholas Wood Memorial Hall. The hall was erected in 1870, by public subscription, as a memorial to Nicholas Wood, the first President of the North of England Institute of Mining and Mechanical Engineers, after his death in December 1865. It was opened in July 1872 by the then President of the Mining Institute, Edward Fenwick Boyd, The Very Rev. the Dean of the Durham, the Mayor of Newcastle and numerous members of the town council.

It was erected primarily for the accommodation of the members of the coal trade as well as mining and Mechanical Engineers of the North of England and it has been the home of the Mining Institute ever since. It was designed and built in the height of the Gothic revival by architect A.M. Dunn and it contains a large marble statue of a seated Nicholas Wood, created by Mr Wyon, overlooking the library. Today it continues to be of educational importance. It houses numerous documents, transactions, maps and books stemming from its origins in 1852. The addition of the lecture theatre in 1902 expanded this educational element and is used to host speakers and lectures based on numerous elements related to the mining industry ranging from ‘Migrant Miners’ to ‘Colliers Viewers, Engineers and the Making of the Modern World’.

== Later life ==
The ending of Boyd’s presidency in 1872 did not see the end of him as a member of the Institution; he continued as a member of the council until 1882. In 1875, he joined forces with his son Robert Fenwick Boyd to produce a paper on "The Coal- Measures and Oil Produce of the United States of America". This venture took them to the United States of America to gather information on the origins and production of the mineral oil. This paper was the last of Edward Fenwick Boyd’s work to be read and disputed before the members of the Mining Institute before turning his focus and the remainder of his life to serving as a magistrate for the county. He devoted the rest of his time and health to the law and to county business. However, as his physical health began to deteriorate in 1883 he was forced to retire back to Moor House ending all activity in both the court room and the Institute and he was put under the care of his daughter until his death on 31 August 1889.

In addition to the published work of Edward Fenwick Boyd, his time as President of the Institute saw the opening of the College of Physical Science and the Nicholas Wood Memorial Hall; both of which were highly influential and significant projects. His involvement in projects such as these demonstrates his dedication and passion for the North of England Institute of Mining and Mechanical Engineers.
