= Charles Twining Boyd =

Archdeacon of Colombo from 1891 to 1901

The Ven Charles Twining Boyd
- Anglican Archdeacon of Colombo
- Church: Anglican Church of Ceylon
- See: Anglican Diocese of Colombo
- In office: 1891 — 1901

Personal details
- Born: 19 February 1842
- Died: 3 May 1914 (aged 72)

The Venerable Charles Twining Boyd (19 February 1842 - 3 May 1914) was Archdeacon of Colombo from 1891 until 1901.

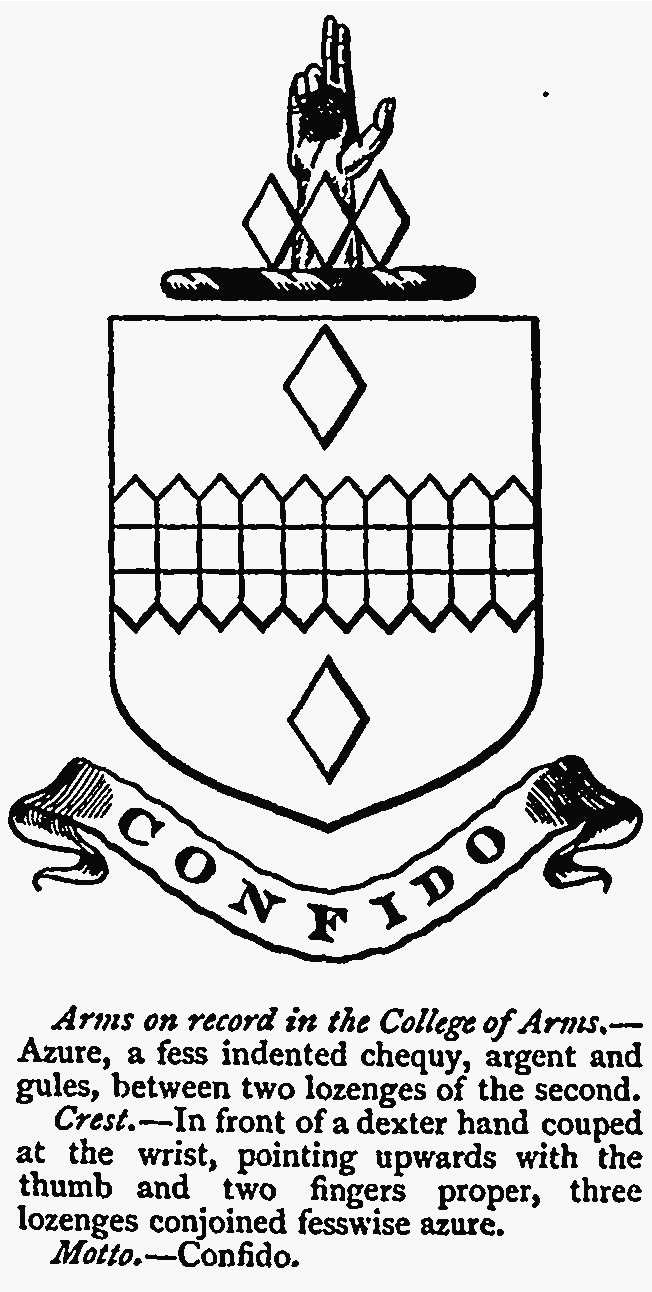
The coat-of-arms of Boyd of Moor House, County Durham

His father was The Ven. William Boyd (1809 - 1893), of University College, Oxford, who was Archdeacon of Craven and Honorary Canon of Ripon from 1860, and his mother was Isabella Twining (1805 - 1880), the eldest daughter of George Twining of Sheen, Surrey. His uncle was the mining industrialist Edward Fenwick Boyd and his aunt Mary married Joseph Stanley Hawks JP DL, Sheriff of Newcastle.

His elder brother William Boyd (b. 1839) married Jane Diana Hawks (b. 1839) who was the niece of George Hawks, Mayor of Gateshead, and the daughter of Mary Anne Knightley, through whom she descended from the House of Plantagenet on several lines, including from Henry Pole, 1st Baron Montagu and through Valentine Knightley of Fawsley MP (1718 - 1754).

His paternal grandfather was the armigerous banker William Boyd Junior (1773 - 1855), of Newcastle upon Tyne and Burfield Priory, Gloucester, who was a partner in the Newcastle Old Bank. His paternal grandmother was Esther (née Locke) Boyd (1777 - 1818).

He was educated at Rugby School and University College, Oxford. After a curacy in Newbury he was Rector of Princes Risborough from 1877 to 1879. He was Chaplain of St. Peter's Church, Colombo, and to the British Armed Forces in Sri Lanka, from 1879 until his appointment as Archdeacon.
