= Sir John Alleyne, 1st Baronet =

British baronet, Barbadian politician (1724–1801)

Sir John Gay Alleyne, 1st Baronet (28 April 1724 – 1801) was a British baronet, Barbados landowner, and Barbadian politician.

== Family ==
Sir John Gay Alleyne was born at Saint James, Barbados, the second son of John Alleyne and his wife Mary Terrill, who was the daughter of William Terrill. The Alleyne family (like the Clement family, Codrington family, Drax family, and Terrill family) were amongst the 17th century colonisers of Barbados. The first Alleyne to emigrate to Barbados was Reynold Alleyne, who was the son of The Rev. Richard Alleyne D. D., Rector of St. Mary's, Stowting, Kent, and who emigrated to Barbados between 1628 and 1630.

On 19 October 1746 at St James Church, Barbados, John Gay Alleyne married Cristen Dottin, who was the fourth daughter of Anne Jordan Dottin and Joseph Dottin. His marriage brought him ownership of the estate of the Jacobean mansion St Nicholas Abbey in Saint Peter, Barbados, which became one of the most successful sugar-plantations in Barbados before (after the death of their only son, at Eton College when aged 12 years) its ownership reverted to his wife's relations on her death during 1782.

Alleyne married, secondly, on 29 June 1786, first cousin Jane Abel Alleyne, who was the daughter of Major Abel Gay Alleyne (1699–1747), of Mount Steadfast and later of Braintree, Massachusetts, by his wife Mary (née Woodbridge), who lived out her days at what is now known as the Dorothy Q. Homestead in Massachusetts, which is now a museum that is managed by the Massachusetts Society of Colonial Dames. She was forty years his junior. They had five daughters and two sons.

== Career ==
In 1757, Alleyne was elected for the Parish of St. Andrew to the Parliament of Barbados, a seat he held for the next forty years, with only a break in 1771. Already after a decade in the Parliament, he became Speaker of the House of Assembly of Barbados, serving until 1770 and after another two years was reappointed until 1779. Despite being a slaveowner, Alleyne expressed opinions unpopular to the planter class, such as his declaration in the House of Assembly that slavery were "an unhappy sight which leaves an immense debt upon us to clear the obligation of human nature". Alleyne was created a baronet, of Four Hills, in the Island of Barbados on 6 April 1769.

== Legacy ==
In 1770, Alleyne funded the establishment of The Seminary, a school for "the maintenance, support, and education of poor boys" that received permission to admit young boys of colour. It was later renamed The Alleyne School, as which it continues today, and was the first government co-educational secondary school in Barbados.

Alleyne introduced mahogany to Barbados and planted the impressive mahogany avenue leading to Cherry Tree Hill.

Mount Gay Distilleries Ltd., who are the world's oldest known rum brand to continue to exist, was on Alleyne's death renamed, from its earlier name of Mount Gilboa Plantation and Distillery, by his close friend John Sober who had employed him as manager of the company.

== Death ==
Alleyne's wife died in 1800 and he survived her until the following year. His two elder sons had predeceased him and he was succeeded in the baronetcy by his third son Reynold Abel Alleyne (1789–1870), by whose daughter he was the great-grandfather of the Belgravia cricketers Richard Clement (cricketer) and Reynold Clement.

== Notes ==
Political offices
Parliament of Barbados
Preceded by	Member of Parliament for Saint Andrew; 1757 – 1797	Succeeded by
Preceded by John Lyte	Speaker of the House of Assembly of Barbados; 1767 – 1770	Succeeded by Samson Wood
Preceded by Samson Wood	Speaker of the House of Assembly of Barbados; 1772 – 1779	Succeeded by Samson Wood
Baronetage of Great Britain
New creation	Baronet (of Four Hills); 1769 – 1801	Succeeded by Reynold Abel Alleyne
