= List of plantations in Barbados =

Barbados has a number of plantations and great house properties that were instrumental in the islands' booming sugar trade. Families often owned several plantations and the acreage of each often changed when owners bought and/or sold plots of nearby land. The sizes quoted here had been recorded as of 1915. After emancipation, more than half of the near 1000 plantation-estates became tenantry villages and remain villages to this day. Many of the remaining properties are now protected by the Barbados National Trust and very few may have been passed down to current family members.

Name	Parish	Photo	Acres*	Description
Balls Plantation	Christ Church		384	Once owned by the Balls family, by 1913 it passed to the Yearwoods, before finally becoming the home of the Barbados Horticultural Society.
Brighton Plantation	St. George		393	Once owned by George Clarke Pile, today it is still owned by the Pile family.
Byde Mill Plantation House	St. George		324	As recently as 1913 it was owned by the Skeete family.
Drax Hall Plantation	St. George		957	Once owned by Colonel James Drax, it is one of the oldest remaining buildings with a Jacobean-style of architecture in Barbados. By 1913 it was owned by Dunsany. As of 2017, owned by Richard Drax MP.
Francia Plantation	St. George			A relatively modern plantation built in 1913 by Rene Mourraille, it currently houses a private school. It is a designated property of the Barbados National Trust.
Babbs	St. Lucy		81	By 1913 the owner was Pedder
Barrows	St. Lucy		85	By 1913 the owner was Bovell
Bourbon	St. Lucy		191	By 1913 the owner was Skeete
Bright Hall	St. Lucy		177	By 1913 the owner was Boyce
Bromefield	St. Lucy		381	By 1913 the owner was Bashford et al.
Cane Garden	St. Lucy		33	By 1913 the owner was St. John et al.
Chance Hall	St. Lucy		110	By 1913 the owner was Pilgrim
Checker Hall	St. Lucy		320	By 1913 the owner was Harris
Collyns	St. Lucy		198	By 1913 the owner was Gibbons
Cottage	St. Lucy		85	By 1913 the owner was Skinner & Perkins
Cove	St. Lucy		119	By 1913 the owner was Springer
Cluffs	St. Lucy		103	By 1913 the owner was Kellman
Crab Hill	St. Lucy		329	By 1913 the owner was Skinner
Fairfield	St. Lucy		157	By 1913 the owner was Ward
Friendship	St. Lucy		332	By 1913 the owner was O’Neal
Friendly Hall	St. Lucy		53	By 1913 the owner was Cox
Flatfield	St. Lucy		40	By 1913 the owner was Bowen
Hannays	St. Lucy		181	By 1913 the owner was Bashford et al.
Harrisons	St. Lucy		381	By 1913 the owner was Ward et al.
Hope	St. Lucy		284	By 1913 the owner was Allan & Skinner
Hopeville	St. Lucy		35	By 1913 the owner was Johnson
Husbands	St. Lucy		258	By 1913 the owner was Shepheard & Poyer
Lamberts	St. Lucy		518	By 1913 the owner was Phillips
Lowland	St. Lucy		175	By 1913 the owner was Skeete
Mountgay	St. Lucy		385	By 1913 the owner was Thornhill
Mount Pleasant	St. Lucy		38	By 1913 the owner was O’Neal
Mount Poyer	St. Lucy		205	By 1913 the owner was Fellowes
Pickerings	St. Lucy		383	By 1913 the owner was Fenwick
Risk	St. Lucy		87	By 1913 the owner was Seale
Spring Garden	St. Lucy		170	By 1913 the owner was Fellowes
Spring Hall	St. Lucy		384	By 1913 the owner was Fellowes
Trents	St. Lucy		189	By 1913 the owner was Boyce
Union	St. Lucy		30	By 1913 the owner was Johnson
Whiteheads	St. Lucy		72	By 1913 the owner was Kellman
Andrews	St. Joseph		310	By 1913 the owner was Gibbs
Auburn	St. Joseph		26	By 1913 the owner was Evelyn
Bissex Hill	St. Joseph		230	By 1913 the owner was Haynes
Blackmans	St. Joseph		378	By 1913 the owner was Colvin
Buckden	St. Joseph		96	By 1913 the owner was Sealy
Cambridge	St. Joseph		295	By 1913 the owner was Roach
Castle Grant	St. Joseph		272	By 1913 the owner was Cox
Chimborazo	St. Joseph		38	By 1913 the owner was Gill
Clement Rock	St. Joseph		40	By 1913 the owner was Elliott
Easy Hall & Saltram	St. Joseph		354	By 1913 the owner was Haynes
Forster Hall	St. Joseph		433	By 1913 the owner was Walcott & Wood
Frizers	St. Joseph		404	By 1913 the owner was Wood
Fruitful Hill	St. Joseph		13	By 1913 the owner was Haynes
Horse Hill	St. Joseph		42	By 1913 the owner was Niccolls
Indian Pond	St. Joseph		43	By 1913 the owner was Massiah
Joes River	St. Joseph		554	By 1913 the owner was Williams et al.
Lammings	St. Joseph		141	By 1913 the owner was McClean
Little Diamond	St. Joseph		3	By 1913 the owner was Gill
Little Island	St. Joseph		16	By 1913 the owner was Walton
Malvern	St. Joseph		315	By 1913 the owner was Austin
Mellowes	St. Joseph		250	By 1913 the owner was Haynes
Mount Dacres	St. Joseph		86	By 1913 the owner was Williams
Overtons	St. Joseph		10	By 1913 the owner was Niccolls
Parks	St. Joseph		262	By 1913 the owner was Haynes
Retreat	St. Joseph		132	By 1913 the owner was Carrington
Richmond	St. Joseph		36	By 1913 the owner was Boyce
Spa	St. Joseph		101	By 1913 the owner was Gill
Springfield	St. Joseph		395	By 1913 the owner was Williams
Tamarind Grove	St. Joseph		7	By 1913 the owner was Browne
Vale	St. Joseph		12	By 1913 the owner was Haynes
Union	St. Joseph		7	By 1913 the owner was Mayers
Vaughans	St. Joseph		129	By 1913 the owner was Robinson
Airy Cot	St. Thomas		33	By 1913 the owner was Nurse
Applewhaites	St. Thomas		456	By 1913 the owner was Cobham
Arthur Seat	St. Thomas		5	By 1913 the owner was Williams
Ayshford	St. Thomas		165	By 1913 the owner was Parris
Bagatelle	St. Thomas		213	By 1913 the owner was Bascom
Barnwell	St. Thomas		16	By 1913 the owner was Smith
Bennetts	St. Thomas		279	By 1913 the owner was Forte
Bucks	St. Thomas		60	By 1913 the owner was Ward
Bushy Park	St. Thomas		72	By 1913 the owner was Gooding
Bloomsbury	St. Thomas		131	By 1913 the owner was Greaves
Cane Field	St. Thomas		240	By 1913 the owner was Clarke Executors
Cane Garden	St. Thomas		238	By 1913 the owner was Pile
Clifton	St. Thomas		240	By 1913 the owner was King
Cleveland	St. Thomas		59	By 1913 the owner was Mottley
Content	St. Thomas		211	By 1913 the owner was Layne
Dukes	St. Thomas		181	By 1913 the owner was Manning & Sealy
Dunscombe & Lewis	St. Thomas		382	By 1913 the owner was Rose
Edgehill	St. Thomas		234	By 1913 the owner was Yearwood (Trustee)
Endeavour & Hopefield	St. Thomas		105	By 1913 the owner was Parris
Exchange	St. Thomas		97	By 1913 the owner was Tryhane
Farmers	St. Thomas		308	By 1913 the owner was Harris
Fisher Pond	St. Thomas		314	By 1913 the owner was Fisherpond Est. Company
Fortress	St. Thomas		87	By 1913 the owner was Manning & Sealy
Grand View	St. Thomas		97	By 1913 the owner was Hawkins
Hopewell	St. Thomas		306	By 1913 the owner was Inniss
Highland	St. Thomas		161	By 1913 the owner was Mahon
Hilloby	St. Thomas		271	By 1913 the owner was Hinkson et al.
Lion Castle	St. Thomas		236	By 1913 the owner was Mahon
Mangrove Pond	St. Thomas		234	By 1913 the owner was Lynch
Mount Wilton & Maynards	St. Thomas		534	By 1913 the owner was Harris
Olive Branch	St. Thomas		110	By 1913 the owner was Yearwood
Pleasant Vale	St. Thomas		27	By 1913 the owner was Dash
Plum Tree	St. Thomas		154	By 1913 the owner was Parris et al.
Ridgeway	St. Thomas		209	By 1913 the owner was Packer
Rugby	St. Thomas		141	By 1913 the owner was Bagot
Selmans	St. Thomas		51	By 1913 the owner was Edghill
Strong Hope	St. Thomas		150	By 1913 the owner was Roach
Sturges	St. Thomas		150	By 1913 the owner was Parris
Vaucluse	St. Thomas		584	By 1913 the owner was Ashby
Walkes Spring	St. Thomas		328	By 1913 the owner was Flemming
Welches	St. Thomas		153	By 1913 the owner was Hutson
Welchmanhall	St. Thomas		224	By 1913 the owner was Carrington
Bank Hall	St. Michael		145	By 1913 the owner was Murphy
Bay	St. Michael		128	By 1913 the owner was Hunte
Belle & Little Simmonds	St. Michael		583	By 1913 the owner was Earl of Harewood
Belle View	St. Michael		41	By 1913 the owner was Barclay
Brighton	St. Michael		36	By 1913 the owner was Taylor
Bush Hall & Kew Plantation	St. Michael		147	By 1913 the owner was Haynes
Cane Wood	St. Michael		114	By 1913 the owner was Dear
Dayrells	St. Michael		66	By 1913 the owner was West
Fairfield	St. Michael		95	By 1913 the owner was Lawrence Trustees
Friendship	St. Michael		164	By 1913 the owner was Lynch
Goodland	St. Michael		107	By 1913 the owner was Springer
Grazettes	St. Michael		181	By 1913 the owner was Thorne
Haggatt Hall	St. Michael		364	By 1913 the owner was Ashby
Kensington	St. Michael		73	By 1913 the owner was Alleyne
Lears	St. Michael		626	By 1913 the owner was Lears Estate Company
Lodge	St. Michael		170	By 1913 the owner was McConney
Lower Birney	St. Michael		218	By 1913 the owner was Mahon
Lower Estate	St. Michael		474	By 1913 the owner was Frere et al.
Mount Clapham	St. Michael		343	By 1913 the owner was Evelyn
Neils	St. Michael		213	By 1913 the owner was Gibbs
Pine	St. Michael		452	By 1913 the owner was Lynch
Rock Dundo	St. Michael		30	By 1913 the owner was Mayers
Salters	St. Michael		294	By 1913 the owner was Horne
Spring Garden	St. Michael		72	By 1913 the owner was D’Albuquerque
Upton	St. Michael		241	By 1913 the owner was Arthur
Warrens	St. Michael		316	By 1913 the owner was Trotman
Waterford	St. Michael		532	By 1913 the owner was Collymore
Wildey	St. Michael		174	By 1913 the owner was Hinkson
Whitehall	St. Michael		132	By 1913 the owner was Barnes
Bayleys Plantation	St. Philip		449	By 1913 the owners were Cyril G. Sisnett and his Brother
Briggs	St. Philip		118	By 1913 the owner was Briggs
Cane Garden	St. Philip		15	By 1913 the owner was Clarke
Carringtons & Chapel	St. Philip		939	By 1913 the owner was Carrington
Congo Road	St. Philip		281	By 1913 the owner was Ward
Diamond	St. Philip		19	By 1913 the owner was Greenidge
Eastbourne	St. Philip		88	By 1913 the owner was Shepherd
Edgecumbe	St. Philip		305	By 1913 the owner was Skeete
Fairfield	St. Philip		92	By 1913 the owner was Walcott
Foursquare, Grove, Brewsters, Sandy Hill & Thurban	St. Philip		1067	By 1913 the owner was Hawkins et al.
Golden Grove	St. Philip		206	By 1913 the owner was Browne et al.
Grand View	St. Philip		17	By 1913 the owner was Rolstone
Halton	St. Philip		307	By 1913 the owner was Mayers
Hampton, Bushy Park & Sunbury	St. Philip		1112	By 1913 the owner was Cameron
Harmony Lodge	St. Philip		84	By 1913 the owner was Boxill
Harrow	St. Philip		375	During the 18th century the owner was John Allen Olton. By 1913 the owner was Olton's grandson Sir John Alleyne, 3rd Baronet
Jezreel	St. Philip		48	By 1913 the owner was Lashley
Kirton	St. Philip		416	By 1913 the owner was Browne
Mangrove	St. Philip		451	By 1913 the owner was Weekes
Mapps	St. Philip		250	By 1913 the owner was Johnson
Mount Pleasant	St. Philip		317	By 1913 the owner was Image et al.
Oldbury	St. Philip		350	By 1913 the owner was Ward
Oughterson	St. Philip		188	By 1913 the owner was Farmer
Pollards	St. Philip		111	By 1913 the owner was Bourne
River	St. Philip		405	By 1913 the owner was Farmer
Ruby	St. Philip		436	By 1913 the owner was Clarke
Sandfords	St. Philip		169	By 1913 the owner was Hughes et al.
Shepherds Cot	St. Philip		73	By 1913 the owner was Gooding
Stirling	St. Philip		219	By 1913 the owner was Gooding
Thicket & Fortescue	St. Philip		720	By 1913 the owner was Earl of Harewood
Three Houses	St. Philip		444	By 1913 the owner was Browne et al.
Union Hall	St. Philip		70	By 1913 the owner was Gooding
Vineyard	St. Philip		209	By 1913 the owner was Farmer
Wiltshire	St. Philip		230	By 1913 the owner was Skeete
Alleynedale (previously called Cabbage Tree Hall)	St. Peter		350	Owned by Alleyne baronets from 1810 to 1895.
Ashton Hall	St. Peter		213	By 1913 the owner was Ward et al.
Bakers	St. Peter		289	By 1913 the owner was Durant
Battalleys	St. Peter		64	By 1913 the owner was Kellman
Bayfield/Sweetfield	St. Peter		72	By 1913 the owner was Clarke
Black Bess	St. Peter		328	Richard Clement (1754 – 1829) and then his son John Clement. By 1913 the owner was Parris
Castle (Sober Castle, Ellis Castle, Clement Castle)	St. Peter		520	Richard Clement (1754 – 1829) and then his son Hampden Clement (1807 – 1880). By 1913 the owner was Ashby
Colleton	St. Peter		230	By 1913 the owner was Packer
Ebworth	St. Peter		260	By 1913 the owner was Cave
Farm	St. Peter		137	By 1913 the owner was Trimingham
Gibbes	St. Peter		219	By 1913 the owner was Pilgrim
Haymans	St. Peter		228	By 1913 the owner was Pile
Heywoods	St. Peter		153	By 1913 the owner was Leacock
Hopeland	St. Peter		111	By 1913 the owner was Johnson
Mangrove	St. Peter		215	By 1913 the owner was McAndrew
Maynards	St. Peter		234	By 1913 the owner was Corbin. Owned for a short period by the Webster family. Owned since 1962 by the Edwards family
Mount Brevitor	St. Peter		243	By 1913 the owner was Skinner & Perkins
Mount Prospect	St. Peter		206	By 1913 the owner was O’Neal
Mullins	St. Peter		22	By 1913 the owner was Edwards
Orange Hill	St. Peter		355	By 1913 the owner was McConney
Oxford	St. Peter		223	By 1913 the owner was Gill
Pleasant Hall	St. Peter		168	By 1913 the owner was Gill
Portland	St. Peter		308	By 1913 the owner was Chandler
Richmond Hill	St. Peter		132	By 1913 the owner was Hendy
Rock Hall	St. Peter		486	By 1913 the owner was McAndrew
Rock & Four Hills	St. Peter		486	Owned by John Alleyne (1695 - 1718), and his father, and his son Sir John Gay Alleyne, 1st Baronet. By 1913 the owner was Whittaker et al.
Rockless	St. Peter		54	By 1913 the owner was Emtage
Rose Hill	St. Peter		67	By 1913 the owner was Greaves
Six Men's	St. Peter		240	By 1913 the owner was Chandler
St.Nicholas Abbey	St. Peter		409	Acquired by Sir John Gay Alleyne, 1st Baronet by his first marriage to Christian Dottin during 1746. By 1913 the owner was Cave
Warleigh	St. Peter		146	By 1913 the owner was Pile
Welch Town	St. Peter		427	By 1913 the owner was Briggs
Whitehall	St. Peter		182	By 1913 the owner was Eckstein
Bawdens & River	St. Andrew		521	Originally built in 1650 by John Parris it consisted of 247 acres. In 1674 it was owned by John Bawden and John Sparke, then in 1690 by Timothy Thornhill, in 1694 by Reynold Alleyne, in 1800 by Sir John Gay Alleyne, 1st Baronet, and by 1913 Johnson & Hinkson
Baxters	St. Andrew		295	In 1671 built by Sir John Yeamans, William Cox, William Dottinge, Reynold Kelsall the 281 acres were sold to James Harding and then to John Merricke. By 1685 it had grown to 420 acres passed to William Merricke. The in 1691 the owner was William Dottin, in 1704 John Dottin, 1826 John A. Beckles, 1820 James Dottin Maycock and by 1913 the owner was Haynes
Belleplaine	St. Andrew			1817 owned by John Marshall Morris
Boscobelle aka Jeeves	St. Andrew			On the border the estate also lay partly in St. Peter the estate was built in 1721 by John Jeeves. By 1757 owned by Henry Bishop, 1817 by John Marshall Morris and 1820 the 250 Acres owned by James Thomas Rogers and William Marshall Morris.
Breedies & Cleland	St. Andrew		442	In 1817 the estate was owned by William Murray and then by 1913 the owner was Denison et al.
Bruce Vale	St. Andrew		225	By 1913 the owner was Inniss
Burnt House	St. Andrew		166	By 1913 the owner was Pedder
Cane Garden	St. Andrew		22	By 1913 the owner was Sealy
Chalky Mount	St. Andrew		Built in 1680 by Bartholomew Reece, in 1803 the owners Thomas Williams & John Parrot Devonish sold it to David Hall.	
Cheltenham	St. Andrew		30	By 1913 the owner was Medford
Crab Hill	St. Andrew			Owned in 1817 by Thomas Cadogan
Friendship & Barrows	St. Andrew		269	By 1913 the owner was Manning
Groves	St. Andrew		123	By 1913 the owner was Haynes
Greenland & Overhill	St. Andrew		644	Built in 1717 by Abel Dottin and passed in 1783 to Abel Rous Dottin. In 1825, John Rycroft Best owned 403 acres. By 1913 the owner was Greenland Industries Co.
Gregg Farm	St. Andrew		215	Built in 1715 by John Whetstone, by 1817 the owner was Joseph Lowe, by 1844 the owner was James Holder Alleyne, and then by 1913 the owner was still an Alleyne
Haggatts	St. Andrew		506	By 1913 the owner was Hutson
Hill	St. Andrew		150	By 1913 the owner was Hutson
Hopewell	St. Andrew		62	By 1913 the owner was Haynes
Lakes	St. Andrew			1817 owned by Elizabeth S. Vaughan
Less Beholden	St. Andrew		4	By 1913 the owner was Pollard
Mallards	St. Andrew			1820 the owner was Edward Lake Hinds
Merrick	St. Andrew		266	The 266 acres was built in 1674 by John Merrick.
Morgan Lewis	St. Andrew		354	Built in 1721 by John Hannis and by 1913 the owner was Pile
Mount All	St. Andrew		159	Just 149 acres in 1817 when it was owned by Sarah Hacket Straghan, by 1913 the owner was West Indian Estates Ltd.
Overhill	St. Andrew			One of the earliest estates, in 1649 the owner William Gibbs sold its 130 acres to Thomas Merricke. Then in 1659 bought by Col John Yeamans, Capt Henry Wills, Major Symon Lambert & John Foster Clarke. The same year, Thomas Gibbs sold 48 acres to Renold Kellsall and 20 acres to Robert Gibbs, who still owned it in 1675. Consisting of 105 acres by 1680 and owned by Henry Kelsall then in 1736 passed to Thomas Harrison, then 1756 to Mary Harrison Walke and 1800 from Thomas Walke to Harrison Walke Sober.
Sedge Pond	St. Andrew		216	By 1913 the owner was Gill
Spring Vale & Mallards	St. Andrew		187	By 1913 the owner was Parris et al.
Seniors	St. Andrew		150	By 1913 the owner was Haynes
Sunbeam	St. Andrew		5	By 1913 the owner was Taylor & Walkes
Swans	St. Andrew		152	By 1913 the owner was Fitzherbert
Turners Hall	St. Andrew		386	By 1913 the owner was Fitzherbert
Ashford	St. John		198	By 1913 the owner was Hart
Bath	St. John		627	By 1913 the owner was Yearwood
Belle Farm	St. John		15	By 1913 the owner was Greenidge et al.
Bowmanston	St. John		245	By 1913 the owner was Birch, Collymore & Douglas
Claybury	St. John		303	By 1913 the owner was Pile et al.
Cliff	St. John		236	By 1913 the owner was O’Neal
Clifton Hall	St. John		401	By 1913 the owner was Pile
College	St. John		438	By 1913 the owner was The Society for Propagation of the Gospel Trustees
Colleton	St. John		540	By 1913 the owner was Godsal
Eastmont	St. John		44	By 1913 the owner was Austin
Edge Cliff	St. John		102	By 1913 the owner was Greaves
Guinea & Clifden	St. John		585	By 1913 the owner was Simpson
Haynes Hill	St. John		121	By 1913 the owner was Greenidge
Henley	St. John		338	By 1913 the owner was Shepheard & Poyer
Hill View	St. John		38	By 1913 the owner was Sealy
Hothersal	St. John		405	By 1913 the owner was Godsal
Kendal	St. John		151	By 1913 the owner was Fellowes
Lemon Arbor	St. John		170	By 1913 the owner was Sealy
Moncrieffe	St. John		203	By 1913 the owner was Gale
Newcastle	St. John		680	By 1913 the owner was Haynes
Palmer	St. John		266	By 1913 the owner was Herbert
P00l & Risque	St. John		423	By 1913 the owner was Trollope
Queensland	St. John		120	By 1913 the owner was Greenidge
Small Hope	St. John		29	By 1913 the owner was White & Walcott
Rose Gate	St. John		30	By 1913 the owner was Sealy
Sherbourne	St. John		51	By 1913 the owner was Greaves
Society	St. John		336	By 1913 the owner was S.P.G. Trustees
Todds	St. John		255	By 1913 the owner was Forte
Venture	St. John		120	By 1913 the owner was Haynes
Wakefield	St. John		293	By 1913 the owner was Taylor
Adams Castle	Christ Church		287	By 1913 the owner was Ward
Amity Lodge	Christ Church		42	By 1913 the owner was Bonyun Executors
Bannatyne	Christ Church		191	By 1913 the owner was Boyle
Balls	Christ Church		384	By 1913 the owner was Yearwood et al.
Bentley	Christ Church		308	By 1913 the owner was Skeete
Callendars	Christ Church		51	By 1913 the owner was Kirton
Cane Vale	Christ Church		111	By 1913 the owner was Ward
Charnocks	Christ Church		220	By 1913 the owner was Baeza
Chancerylane	Christ Church		353	By 1913 the owner was Yearwood
Coverley	Christ Church		319	By 1913 the owner was Clarke Executors
Durants	Christ Church		206	By 1913 the owner was Ward
Ealing Grove	Christ Church		150	By 1913 the owner was Legall
Enterprise	Christ Church		315	By 1913 the owner was Watson
Fairy Valley	Christ Church		400	By 1913 the owner was Jackman
Frere Pilgrim	Christ Church		226	By 1913 the owner was Hutson
Graeme Hall	Christ Church		276	By 1913 the owner was Clarke
Gibbons	Christ Church		324	By 1913 the owner was Chase
Goodland	Christ Church		63	By 1913 the owner was Clarke. Owned by the Edwards family up to 1962
Hannays & The Ridge	Christ Church		691	By 1913 the owner was Wright & Mahon
Hope	Christ Church		200	By 1913 the owner was Evelyn Bros
Hopefield	Christ Church		201	By 1913 the owner was Ince Executor
Hopewell	Christ Church		70	By 1913 the owner was Deane
Kent	Christ Church		240	By 1913 the owner was Grant
Lower Greys & Sugarland	Christ Church		257	By 1913 the owner was Senhouse
Lowthers	Christ Church		332	By 1913 the owner was Watson
Lowland	Christ Church		110	By 1913 the owner was Seale et al.
Maxwell	Christ Church		430	By 1913 the owner was Jackman
Newton	Christ Church		458	By 1913 the owner was Pemberton For Lane
Pegwell	Christ Church		130	By 1913 the owner was Mahon
Pilgrim Place	Christ Church		274	By 1913 the owner was Leacock Executors
Rycrofts	Christ Church		226	By 1913 the owner was Chaderton
Seawell	Christ Church		343	By 1913 the owner was Lane
Searles & Dayrells	Christ Church		654	By 1913 the owner was Briggs
Small Ridge	Christ Church		206	By 1913 the owner was Evelyn et al.
Spencers	Christ Church		526	By 1913 the owner was Hinkson Executors
Staple Grove	Christ Church		345	By 1913 the owner was Burton
Ventnor	Christ Church		138	By 1913 the owner was Haynes
Warners	Christ Church		118	By 1913 the owner was Ward
Wilcox	Christ Church		212	By 1913 the owner was Watson
Woodburne & Valley Hill	Christ Church		226	By 1913 the owner was Carrington
Worthing View	Christ Church		61	By 1913 the owner was Eversley
Wotton, Kingsland, Maynard	Christ Church		484	By 1913 the owner was Evelyn et al.
Yorkshire & Little Foursquare	Christ Church		363	By 1913 the owner was Arthur
Ashbury	St. George		315	By 1913 the owner was Nurse
Brighton	St. George		393	By 1913 the owner was Pile
Boarded Hall	St. George		313	By 1913 the owner was Pile
Bulkeley	St. George		390	By 1913 the owner was Pile
Buttals	St. George		209	By 1913 the owner was Boxill
Bydemill	St. George		324	By 1913 the owner was Skeete
Carmichaels	St. George		257	By 1913 the owner was Pile
Constant	St. George		480	By 1913 the owner was Robinson
Cottage	St. George		216	By 1913 the owner was Yard
Drax Hall	St. George		957	By 1913 the owner was Dunsany
Egerton	St. George		163	By 1913 the owner was Horne
Ellesmere	St. George		120	By 1913 the owner was Knight
Fairview	St. George		171	By 1913 the owner was Frost Executors
Farm	St. George		183	By 1913 the owner was St. John
Frenches	St. George		245	By 1913 the owner was Skeete et al.
Groves	St. George		160	By 1913 the owner was Yard
Golden Ridge	St. George		178	By 1913 the owner was Yearwood
Hanson	St. George		274	By 1913 the owner was Grayfoot et al.
Hope	St. George		140	By 1913 the owner was Chandler
Jordans	St. George		235	By 1913 the owner was Walcott & Wood
Jehovah Jirah	St. George		15	By 1913 the owner was Marshall
Locust Hall	St. George		340	By 1913 the owner was Hinkson
Market Hill	St. George		34	By 1913 the owner was Murphy
Mount	St. George		287	By 1913 the owner was Earl of Harewood
Monshine Hall	St. George		215	By 1913 the owner was Bancroft
New Market	St. George		50	By 1913 the owner was Hendy Trustee
Prerogative	St. George		107	By 1913 the owner was Hoppin
Redland Cottage	St. George		24	By 1913 the owner was Waterman et al.
Redland	St. George		202	By 1913 the owner was Mahon
Rose Hill	St. George		65	By 1913 the owner was Croney
Rowans	St. George		165	By 1913 the owner was Packer
Rural Cottage	St. George		18	By 1913 the owner was Jones
Stepney	St. George		365	By 1913 the owner was Greenidge
Valley	St. George		250	By 1913 the owner was Williams
Walkers	St. George		264	By 1913 the owner was Yearwood
Windsor	St. George		250	By 1913 the owner was Pile
Woodland	St. George		147	By 1913 the owner was Sealy
Appleby	St. James		37	By 1913 the owner was Greaves
Apes Hill	St. James		453	By 1913 the owner was Austin
Blowers	St. James		433	By 1913 the owner was Sunbury Sugar Est. Co. Ltd
Carlton, Mt. Standfast, Sion Hill, Westmoreland, Weston	St. James		1495	By 1913 the owner was Pilgrim
Clermont	St. James		247	By 1913 the owner was Skinner
Endeavour	St. James		26	By 1913 the owner was Boyle et al.
Holders	St. James		190	By 1913 the owner was Archer
Hope	St. James		40	By 1913 the owner was McKenzie
Husbands	St. James		25	By 1913 the owner was Waite
Lancaster	St. James		480	By 1913 the owner was Wilkinson & Rutherford
Lascelles	St. James		196	By 1913 the owner was Dear
Mullineux	St. James		250	By 1913 the owner was Thorne
Norwood	St. James		307	By 1913 the owner was Clarke
Oxnards	St. James		156	By 1913 the owner was Waith
Prior Park	St. James		207	By 1913 the owner was Skinner
Porters	St. James		285	Once owned by John Forster Alleyne, and his son Charles Thomas, and Thomas Harbin Alleyne. By 1913 the owner was Pilgrim
Prospect	St. James		150	By 1913 the owner was Chare
Rock Pleasant	St. James		24	By 1913 the owner was West
Spring	St. James		532	By 1913 the owner was Walcott
Springhead	St. James		311	By 1913 the owner was Birch et al. Today it is owned by Edward Walcott Senior with his son Edward Walcott Junior (who is now also a husband and a father to Alison Hinds and her daughter) being the trainer for its sister company Springhead Stables Stud Farms
Sandy Lane	St. James		436	By 1913 the owner was Thorne Trustees
Taits	St. James		312	By 1913 the owner was Skinner
Trents	St. James		312	By 1913 the owner was Inniss
Thorpes	St. James		87	By 1913 the owner was Haynes

== See also ==
- List of plantations
