= James Leith Moody =

British clergyman

The Reverend James Leith Moody JP
- Born: 25 June 1816; St. Ann's Garrison, Bridgetown, Barbados
- Died: 1896 (aged 79–80)
- Education: Tonbridge School
- Alma mater: St. Mary Hall, Oxford (BA, 1840; MA, 1842)
- Occupation: Clergyman
- Known for: First priest of the Falkland Islands
- Relatives: Colonel Thomas Moody, Kt. (father); Major-General Richard Clement Moody (brother); Colonel Hampden Clement Blamire Moody CB (brother); Clement Moody, Vicar of Newcastle (paternal cousin); Colonel Richard S. Hawks Moody CB (nephew); The Rev. Canon William James Moody (d. 1927) (son); The Rev. Reginald Frederick Moody (1872 - 1955) (son); Alice Penderel Moody (1868 - 1959) (daughter); Lieutenant George Goldney Moody (d. 1962) JP (son); Anna Robertson (daughter-in-law).

James Leith Moody (1816–1896) JP was a British clergyman who was the first priest of the Falklands Islands, where he was a member of the first Legislative and of the first Executive Council.

== Family ==
James Leith Moody was born at St. Ann's Garrison, Barbados, on 25 June 1816, into a high church landed gentry family that had a history of military service. He was named after Sir James Leith, to whom his father had served as aide-de-camp during the Napoleonic Wars.

He was the fifth child and third son, of ten children, of Colonel Thomas Moody, CRE WI, Kt., by Martha Clement (1784 - 1868) who was the daughter of the Napoleonic Wars veteran and Barbados landowner Richard Clement (1754 – 1829), and the aunt of the Belgravia cricketers Reynold Clement and Richard Clement.

His paternal grandmother was Barbara Blamire of Cumberland who was a cousin of the MP William Blamire and of the poet Susanna Blamire. His first cousin was the high church clergyman, theologian, classical scholar, and freemason, Clement Moody, Vicar of Newcastle.

=== Siblings ===
James Leith Moody's siblings included: Major Thomas Moody (1809 - 1839); Major-General Richard Clement Moody (1813 – 1887) (who was the first British Governor of the Falkland Islands, and the founder of British Columbia); Colonel Hampden Clement Blamire Moody CB (1821 - 1869) (who was Commander of the Royal Engineers in China during the Second Opium War and the Taiping Rebellion); and the sugar-manufacture expert Shute Barrington Moody through whom his nephew was Commander Thomas Barrington Moody (b. 1848) of the Royal Navy.

== Career ==
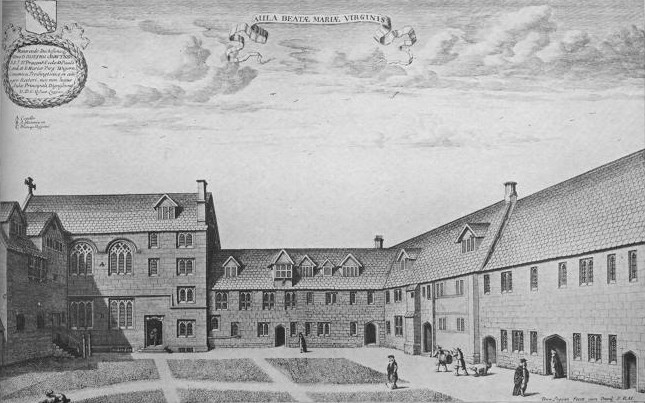
James Leith Moody was educated at St. Mary Hall, Oxford

James Leith was educated at Tonbridge School, from 1827 to 1835, from which he won a Smythe Exhibition, and at St. Mary Hall, Oxford (BA, 1840; MA, 1842). He was ordained as a priest, by John Kaye, Bishop of Lincoln, in 1841.

He served as chaplain to the Royal Navy in China; and to the British Army in Gibraltar, Malta, and Crimea.

He had spent five months at sea in 1845 in HMS Thalia before arrived in the Falkland Islands in October 1845, after a harsh voyage from Rio de Janeiro. In The Falkland Islands, he was found to be 'querulous and eccentric', by his brother Richard Clement Moody, the Governor of the Falkland Islands, whom he accused of breaking the sabbath; and also by his brother's successor as Governor, George Rennie. He was a member of the first Legislative and of the first Executive Council of the Falkland Islands. He opened the Falkland Islands' first school on 1 January 1846 with 12 children. His sermons censured drunkenness and authoritarian governors, and his ministry was accepted by Catholics in addition to Protestants. He left the Falkland Islands in 1854.

He was Assistant Chaplain to the British Armed Forces at Aldershot in 1859. He during 1865 lived at Walmer in Kent. He was Rector of Virginstow, Launceston, Cornwall, from 1876 to 1879, and Vicar of St. John the Baptist, Clay Hill, Enfield, from 1879 to 1885. He retired to West Dulwich where he died on 28 May 1896 whilst living at Clinton House. He left chattels that were worth £4000 (about £200,000 in 21st-century money).

He and his wife Mary, who died on 28 July 1930 at the age of 99 years, are buried at Beckenham Cemetery, England. He is commemorated on a 1994 stamp of the 'Foundation of Stanley Series' that was issued in the Falkland Islands.

== Marriage and Issue ==
On 15 October 1863 at Trinity Church, Winchester, Moody married Mary Longlands, who was the second daughter of The Rev. William David Longlands, who had been educated at Exeter College, Oxford, Lincoln's Inn, and The Queen's College, Oxford, and had been a fellow of Balliol College, Oxford, and Rector of St. Gerran's, Cornwall. They had five children.

=== Issue ===
His youngest son The Rev. Reginald Frederick Moody (13 March 1872 - 9 June 1955, Bromley, Kent) who was educated at Dulwich College and at Queens' College, Cambridge between 1895 and 1901, and at Sarum Theological College. Reginald Frederick was ordained in Durham as a deacon in 1896 and as a priest in 1897. Reginald Frederick worked in the church in America between 1907 and 1909 and was appointed as Chaplain to the British Embassy at Vienna in 1929, and became Vicar of St. Stithians, Cornwall, and Rector of Spennithorne, Leyburn, Yorkshire. Reginald Frederick also worked as chaplain to the British community in Bordighera until Italy entered World War II. He during 1912 married Helen Miriam Stuart Collins, who was the daughter of Joseph Henry Collins FGS and the sister of William Collins, Bishop of Gibraltar.

His other sons included The Rev. Canon William James Moody (d. 1927), formerly Rector and Sub-Dean of the Cathedral, Georgetown, British Guiana, and latterly of St. Paul's, Yelverton, who married Annie Valentine Courtney Ward, who was the daughter of Alexander Valentine Ward (d. 1874, Bombay) who was the surgeon-major of Bombay.

His second son George Goldney Moody (d. 1962) JP, who was born at Walmer, Kent, and was latterly of County Londonderry, Northern Ireland, served in the Boer War, as a machine-gunner of the Imperial Yeomanry, under James Craig, 1st Viscount Craigavon, in which he was captured by the Boers, at Lindley during May 1900, and until September 1900 imprisoned in a camp. George Goldney Moody received the Queen's South Africa Medal with three clasps for his service in that conflict. He during 1903 married Anna Robertson, of Dog Leap, Limavady, who was the sister of the biologist Muriel Robertson, and with whom he returned to South Africa where he farmed until 1920 when he returned to Britain, where he became a member of the Scout movement.

His other children included Alice Penderel Moody (b. c. 1868, Malta, d. 1959, St. Albans), a lace-expert who taught lacemaking on St. Helena and at 54 Sloane Square, as the Principal of the Revival Pillow Lace School. She was the author of Devon Pillow Lace: Its History and How to Make It (Cassell & Co., 1907); and of Lacemaking and Collecting: An Elementary Handbook (Cassell & Co., 1909). She later lived at 115 Ebury Street, from which she gave elocution lessons, and her recitals to music were praised by Queen Victoria. She later lived at 23 Buckingham Palace Road, London.

== Ancestry ==
Ancestors of James Leith Moody

16. Thomas Moody (b. 1650, Moss, Campsall) (son of Henry Moody (fl. 1673) and his wife Hannah Washington)
8. Thomas Moody (1694, Alloway - 1732)
17. Elizabeth (surname unrecorded)
4. Thomas Moody (1732, Arthuret – 1796) (who had fought for the Jacobites at the Battle of Culloden when he was aged only 13 years)
9. Janet Agnes Smith (married 1723, Dalrymple, as his second wife)
2. Colonel Thomas Moody ADC, CRE WI, Kt. (uncle of Clement Moody (clergyman))
10. John Blamire
5. Barbara Blamire (1740 – 1806)
1. The Rev. James Leith Moody (married Mary Longlands, at Winchester, in 1863)
6. Richard Clement (1754–1829)
3. Martha Clement (1784 – 1868) (sister-in-law of Philippa Cobham Alleyne and aunt of Richard Clement (cricketer) and Reynold Clement)
14. Thomas Dougan of Demerara
7. Susannah Dougan (first wife of Richard Clement)
