= Hampden Clement Blamire Moody =

British senior Royal Engineer

Colonel Hampden Clement Blamire Moody CB
- Born: 20 January 1821; 7 Alfred Place, Bedford Square, London
- Died: 27 February 1869 (aged 47–48); 1 Lower Crescent, Belfast, Ireland
- Education: Royal Military Academy, Woolwich
- Relatives: Colonel Thomas Moody, Kt. (father); Martha Clement (1784 – 1868) (mother); Major-General Richard Clement Moody, Kt., Founder of British Columbia (brother); The Rev. James Leith Moody (brother); Colonel Richard Stanley Hawks Moody CB (nephew); Clement Moody, Vicar of Newcastle (paternal cousin)
- Military career
- Allegiance: United Kingdom
- Branch: Royal Engineers
- Rank: Colonel
- Commands: Hong Kong; China; Belfast.
- Conflicts: Kaffir War of 1851 to 1853; Transkei expedition; Waterkloof expedition; Second Opium War; Taiping Rebellion
- Awards: Companion of the Order of the Bath
- Memorials: Balmoral Cemetery, Belfast

Colonel Hampden Clement Blamire Moody CB (20 January 1821 – 27 February 1869) was the Commander of the Royal Engineers in China throughout the Second Opium War and the Taiping Rebellion.

In 1869, he was assassinated by an Irish revolutionary whilst he was serving as Commanding Royal Engineer and as a senior freemason at Belfast. His subsequent funeral was one of the largest to have been held at Belfast.

He was a son of Colonel Thomas Moody, Kt., Commander of the Royal Engineers in the West Indies, and a brother of Major-General Richard Clement Moody, the founder of British Columbia.

== Personal life ==
Hampden Clement Blamire Moody was born on 20 January 1821, at 7 Alfred Place, Bedford Square, London, into a high church landed gentry family that had a history of military service. He was eighth of ten children of Colonel Thomas Moody, ADC, CRE WI, Kt., and of Martha Clement (1784–1868) who was the daughter of the landowner Richard Clement (1754 – 1829) and the aunt of the Belgravia cricketers Reynold Clement and Richard Clement.

He was named after his maternal uncle Hampden Clement (1808 - 1880) who was the joint owner of the estates Black Bess (197 slaves) and Clement Castle (231 slaves) (formerly Sober Castle, latterly Ellis Castle) in Saint Peter, Barbados. His mother Martha Clement descended from the Hampden family.

His paternal grandmother was Barbara Blamire of Cumberland who was a cousin of the MP William Blamire and of the poet Susanna Blamire. His first cousin was the high church clergyman, theologian, classical scholar, and freemason, Clement Moody, Vicar of Newcastle.

=== Siblings ===
Hampden Clement Blamire Moody's siblings included Major Thomas Moody (1809–1839); and Major-General Richard Clement Moody (1813–1887) (who was the first British Governor of the Falkland Islands, and the founder of British Columbia); and The Rev. James Leith Moody (1816–1896) (who was Chaplain to Royal Navy in China, and to the British Army in the Falkland Islands, and Gibraltar, and Malta, and Crimea); and the sugar-manufacture expert Shute Barrington Moody through whom his nephew was Commander Thomas Barrington Moody (b. 1848) of the Royal Navy.

=== Issue ===
Hampden Clement Blamire Moody married Louise Harriet Thomson, who was the daughter of Samuel Thomson, at Belfast, in 1860. They had two daughters, Nea Sophia Louise (b. 14 October 1862), who married O'Donnell Grimshaw, and Harriet Maud Maria (b. 12 February 1867), and one son.

Their son Captain Hampden Lewis Clement (b. 28 February 1865, Hong Kong, d. 19 December 1924), who was educated at Royal Military Academy, Sandhurst, and resided at The Red House, Brockenhurst, Southampton, served, with the 2nd Battalion of the Queen's Own Royal West Kent Regiment, in South Africa and in the Orange Free State and Orange River Colony, including at Biddulphsberg and Wittebergen, and in the Cape Colony, during 1900, before his retirement from the military on 28 August 1907. He was a member of the Army and Navy Club, Pall Mall.

== Career ==
=== Canada ===
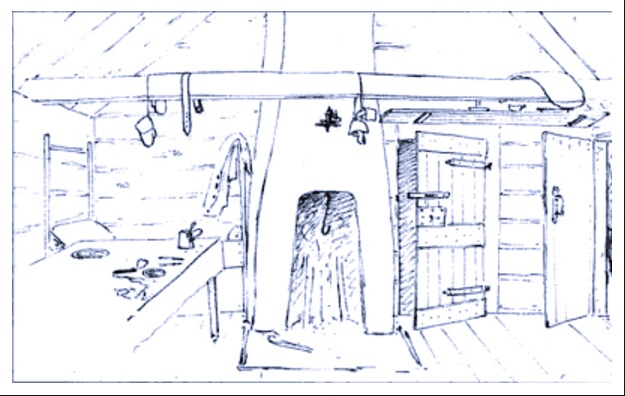
Hampden Clement Blamire Moody, 'Interior of Hudson's Bay Company Post at Pembina' (Pen and ink sketch, Circa 1847) (C-35062 of Public Archives of Canada)

Moody was educated at Royal Military Academy, Woolwich, as a Gentleman Cadet, and commissioned into the Royal Engineers in 1837. The Royal Engineers during the 19th century were a socially exclusive elite land-marine force, whose officers were drawn from the upper middle-class and landed gentry of British society, who performed, in addition to military engineering, 'reconnaissance work, led storming parties, demolished obstacles in assaults, carried out rear-guard actions in retreats and other hazardous tasks'.

Moody was promoted to lieutenant in 1839. He served in Canada from 1840 to 1848, for which he was based at Fort Garry (which later became Winnipeg) which was a trade-base of the Hudson's Bay Company, of which he was a member. Between 1844 and 1846, he performed confidential service behind the United States' border. In 1845, he assisted Edward Boxer and Lieutenant-General William Cuthbert Elphinstone Holloway to investigate Canada's defences and communications against the United States. He during 1846 was promoted to captain and began two years of special service in Hudson Bay Territory, for which he received 'favourable notice' of the British Secretary of State and of the Commander-in-Chief.

Moody was a freemason of St. Paul's Lodge (Ancient York Masons) in Montreal, which was No. 12 on the Registry of Lower Canada and No. 374 on the Registry of England, under the United Grand Lodge of England.

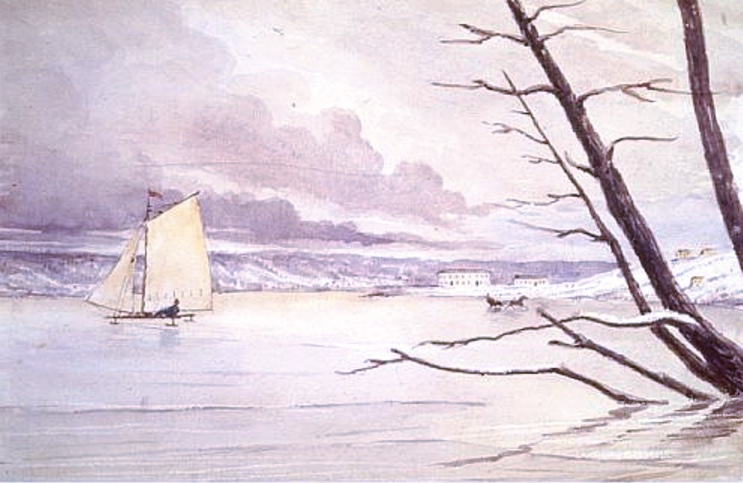
Hampden Clement Blamire Moody, 'An Ice Boat at Penetanguishene, Lake Huron, Upper Canada, From Bainbrigge Sketch' (Watercolour, Circa 1845) (National Archives of Canada, C-11914)

Moody was an accomplished artist whose typical paintings depict Canadian landscapes, and are in The National Archives of the United Kingdom, the Public Archives of Canada, and the Provincial Archives of Manitoba.

=== Kaffir War ===
Moody fought in the Kaffir War of 1851 to 1853, for which he received a medal and a notice for his conduct on 12 and 13 June 1852, on which he had led a much outnumbered group of Royal Engineers in the Koonap Pass during a shootout against rebel Khoekhoe between wagons and dwellings. He was the commander of the 9th Field Company Royal Engineers during 1852 and was Senior Royal Engineer on the 1852 Waterkloof and Transkei expeditions with Sir George Cathcart.

=== Hong Kong and China ===
Moody was the commander of the Royal Engineers across all of Hong Kong and China during the Second Opium War (1856 – 1860) and, from April and May 1862, during the Taiping Rebellion, near Shanghai. He was Commanding Royal Engineer during the Taiping Rebellion until he became unwell and was replaced by 'Chinese Gordon'. He was promoted to major in October 1858, and to lieutenant-colonel on 28 November 1859, and to colonel in November 1864. He was invested as a Companion of the Order of the Bath.

=== Belfast and Death ===
Moody was serving as Commanding Royal Engineer at Belfast when he died on 27 February 1869, at his residence 1 Lower Crescent, from a kidney infection that he had contracted from his assault by an Irish revolutionary. His funeral in Belfast was attended by 240 soldiers of the 54th Regiment and their brass band, and the Royal Engineers and their band, and a troop of the 12th Lancers, and the band of the Antrim Rifles, and the members of Ark Masonic Lodge X/No. 10, of which he had served as Past Master and as Senior Warden.

He was buried at Malone Cemetery, Belfast, which was later renamed Balmoral Cemetery, Belfast. His diverse collection of Chinese ornaments was sold in Belfast during March 1869.

His widow was living at 41 West Cromwell Road, South Kensington, in 1903, and died during December 1908, when she left an estate of £15,449 (over £1.2 million in 21st-century money).

== Ancestry ==
Ancestors of Hampden Clement Blamire Moody

16. Thomas Moody (b. 1650, Moss, Campsall) (son of Henry Moody (fl. 1673) and his wife Hannah Washington)
8. Thomas Moody (1694, Alloway - 1732)
17. Elizabeth (surname unrecorded)
4. Thomas Moody (1732, Arthuret – 1796) (who had fought for the Jacobites at the Battle of Culloden when he was aged only 13 years)
9. Janet Agnes Smith (married 1723, Dalrymple, as his second wife)
2. Colonel Thomas Moody ADC, CRE WI, Kt. (uncle of Clement Moody (clergyman))
10. John Blamire
5. Barbara Blamire (1740 – 1806)
1. Colonel Hampden Clement Blamire Moody CB (married Louise Harriet Thomson, at Belfast, in 1860)
6. Richard Clement (1754–1829)
3. Martha Clement (1784 – 1868) (sister-in-law of Philippa Cobham Alleyne and aunt of Richard Clement (cricketer) and Reynold Clement)
14. Thomas Dougan of Demerara
7. Susannah Dougan (first wife of Richard Clement)

== Sources ==
- Vetch, Robert Hamilton (1894). "Moody, Richard Clement" . Dictionary of National Biography. Vol. 38. p. 332-333.
