= Sir John Alleyne, 3rd Baronet =

Sir John Gay Newton Alleyne, 3rd Baronet (8 September 1820 – 20 February 1912) was a British baronet, Barbados landowner, and industrial engineer in England, who designed the roof of St Pancras Railway Station, London, which was then the largest steel surface ever built.

== Family ==
Alleyne was born in Alleynedale Hall, formerly Cabbage Tree Hall, in Saint Peter, Barbados, the son of Sir Reynold Abel Alleyne, 2nd Baronet, and his wife Rebecca Olton (1794–1860). His parents were married on 6 July 1831 in St. Peter, Barbados. His maternal grandfather was John Allen Olton who owned the Harrow estate in Saint Philip, Barbados, that he inherited.

The Alleyne family (like the Clement family, Codrington family, Drax family, and Terrill family) were amongst the 17th century colonisers of Barbados. The first Alleyne to emigrate to Barbados was Reynold Alleyne, who was the son of The Rev. Richard Alleyne D. D., Rector of St. Mary’s, Stowting, Kent, who had emigrated to Barbados between 1628 and 1630.

His sister Philippa Cobham Alleyne (1813–1889) married the Barbados landowner Hampden Clement (1807–1880) who inherited the estates Black Bess (196 slaves) and Clement Castle (220 slaves) (formerly Sober Castle, latterly Ellis Castle) in Saint Peter, Barbados. He therefore was the maternal uncle of the Belgravia cricketers Richard Clement and Reynold Clement.

== Early years ==
He was educated at Harrow School and Bonn University. His first work was in the sugar industry in Barbados. His father received compensation for slaves after the abolition of slavery that John inherited.

== Career in England ==
He was Warden of Dulwich College between 1845 and 1851, and President of the Steel and Iron Institute. Alleyne had joined the Butterley Company in 1852 as its first manager at a time when highly paid professionals were being brought into the industry. He served as manager and chief engineer of the ironworks for 28 years. He designed the roof of St Pancras Railway Station, which has a span of 240 feet (73 m), which was then the largest steel surface ever built, of which he forged the girders at Butterley. He also carried out the project of a two-track railway bridge over the Maas at Dordrecht in the Netherlands. His addresses were given as Belper in Derbyshire and Falmouth.

Alleyne patented a method in 1861 which allowed hot ingots to be moved around a roller after it had passed by just one person. During the production of steel sections the bar has to be repeatedly put through rollers. Allowing this to happen using just one person provided a substantial increase in productivity. However his most notable invention was probably the two high reversing steel mill patented in 1870, which used two steam engines to allow metal ingots to be repeatedly rolled in order to get the correct size and section. With this technique the steel did not have to be moved to re-enter the rolling process but merely had to be moved back into the rolling machine once it had passed through. He also devised a method of determining the percentages of phosphorus in steel using a spectroscope.

== Personal life ==
In his spare time he was an amateur astronomer and metalworker in his workshop at home.

Alleyne married Augusta Isabella, who was the daughter of Sir Henry FitzHerbert, 3rd Baronet, in 1851. He died on 20 February 1912, aged 91.

Baronetage of Great Britain
Preceded by Reynold Abel Alleyne	Baronet (of Four Hills); 1870–1912	Succeeded by John Meynell Alleyne
