= St Nicholas Abbey =

17th century plantation home in Barbados

Coordinates: 13.2775386°N 59.5920475°W

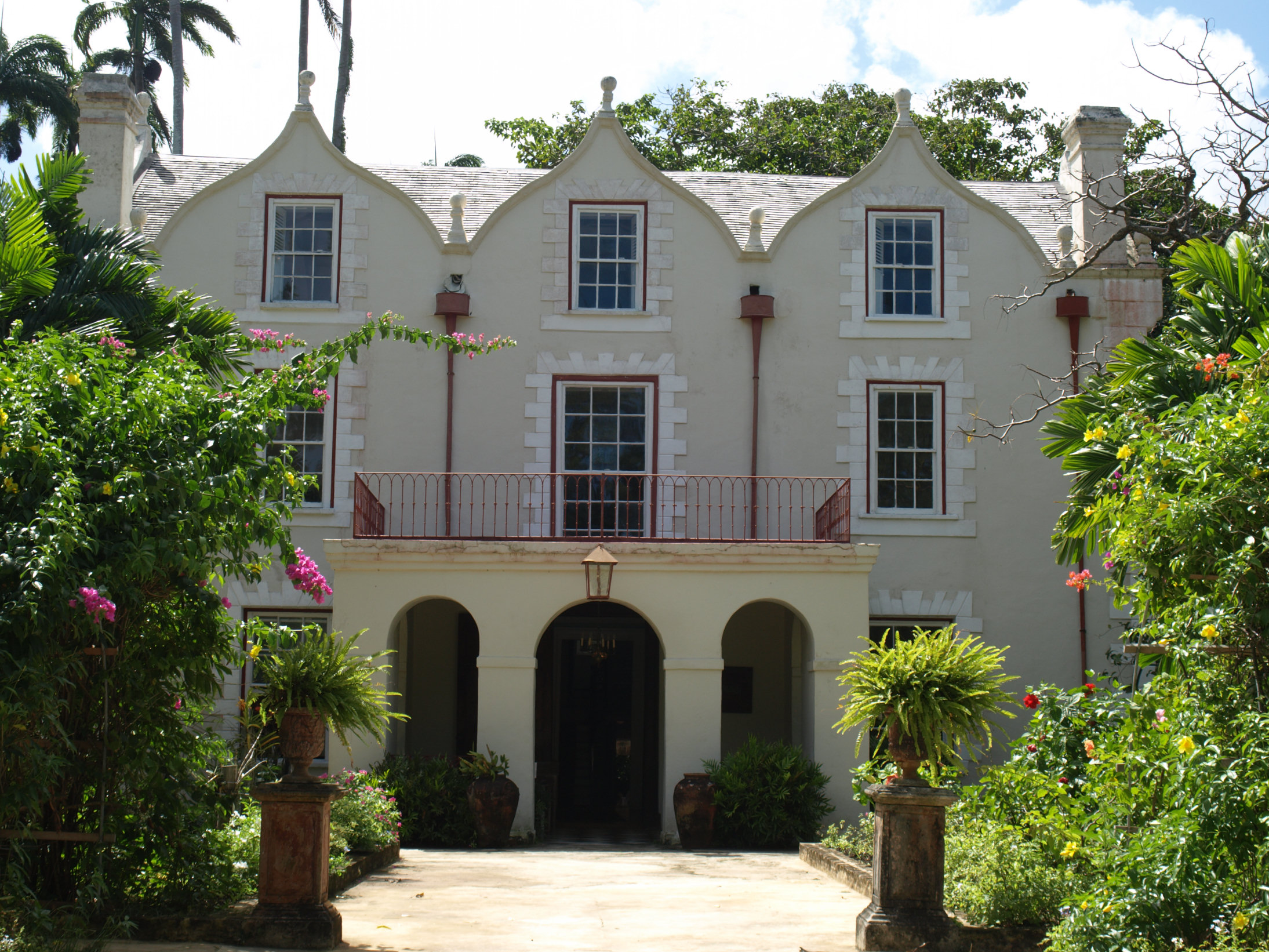
St Nicholas Abbey front elevation

St Nicholas Abbey is located in Saint Peter, Barbados, and is a plantation house, museum and rum distillery. Colonel Benjamin Berringer built the house in 1658. This house is one of only three genuine Jacobean mansions in the Western Hemisphere. It is similar to the English Jacobean-era manor houses of the first half of the seventeenth century, the period between the Tudor and Georgian styles, beginning in the reign of James I.

== History ==
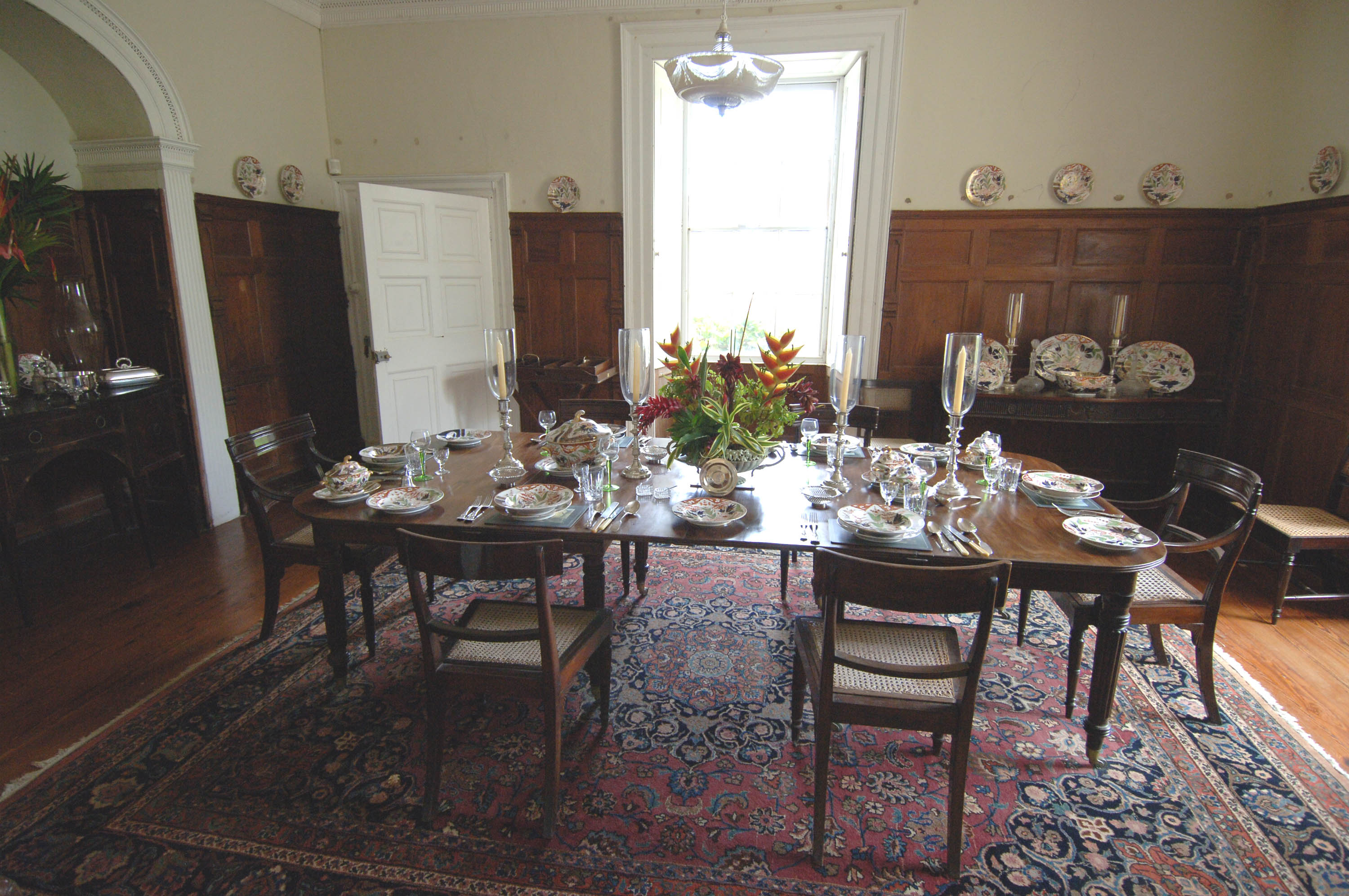
Dining Room at St Nicholas Abbey

St Nicholas Abbey has no church connection, it has always been a sugarcane plantation house. The exact origin of its name is not known but rumour has it that it was named after George Nicholas, husband to Berringer's granddaughter, Susanna.

Berringer was killed in a duel with his neighbor, Sir John Yeamans, who then married Berringer's widow and claimed the abbey as his property. In 1669, the Colonel's children took the matter to court and were awarded ownership of the property. Sir John and his wife then moved to British America, where they helped found South Carolina.

The house and estate was acquired by Sir John Gay Alleyne, 1st Baronet, who descended from one of the earliest English emigrants to Barbados, by his first marriage to Christian Dottin during 1746, and became one of the most successful sugar plantations in Barbados. Sir John introduced mahogany to Barbados and planted the impressive mahogany avenue leading to Cherry Tree Hill.

St Nicholas Abbey was briefly owned by the slave-owning ancestors of Britain’s Oscar-nominated actor Benedict Cumberbatch from 1810 through 1824 after his son Edward Cumberbatch Jr married female British Barbadian singer Mary Ashé although some references dispute the duration of Cumberbatch ownership.

The house passed by marriage to Charles Cave in 1824.

The abbey was no longer a functioning plantation after 1947. Sugar has been grown on the plantation since 1640 and there is still the evidence of the mill and sugar making edifices. Sugar was processed on the property until 1947, the cane is now trucked eight miles to the Portvale Sugar Factory for processing.

His great-great-grandson Lt. Col. Stephen Cave OBE lived there from 1978 until his death in November 2003.

Since 2006, the abbey is owned by local Barbadian architect, Larry Warren. Warren built the St. Nicholas Abbey Heritage Railway on his estate, which was completed by the end of 2018.

== Museum ==
St Nicholas Abbey is currently a museum, successfully recreating 18th-century plantation life complete with; Wedgwood pottery, Chippendale furniture, curvilinear Dutch gables with tall finials of carved coral stone and corner chimneys. The entrance portico, Chinese Chippendale staircase and cedar panelling are later additions to the home. The fireplaces and walled Medieval herb garden were almost certainly included in the original plans brought from England, and copied faithfully.

There is a rare 1930s film of life on a sugar plantation that is available for viewing in the museum. Listed by the Barbados Tourism Marketing Inc as one of the "Seven Wonders of Barbados," the property has attracted several thousand visitors a year. Amongst the mahogany trees are box, cabbage palm, silk cotton, and avocado trees.

== Literature ==
- St. Nicholas Abbey. Tour guide. 350 years of heritage preserved for future generations., [16 pages without numbers], preface from Larry Warren, St. Peter, Barbados, [without date, 2018?]
