= Clement Moody =

Clement Moody may refer to:

- Clement Moody (clergyman) (1809–1871), British high church Anglican clergyman
- Clement Moody (Royal Navy officer) (1891–1960), Royal Navy officer

== See also ==
- Richard Clement Moody (1813–1887), Royal Engineer and founder of British Columbia
