= Archibald Pile =

Lawyer and landowner in Barbados

Archibald Jones Pile (died 1898) was lawyer and landowner in Barbados. He owned the Greens Estate, Saint George estate and part owned two others. Through acting as an attorney via his legal practice he controlled thirty estates in total.

He was murdered when returning home after paying his labourers on Planter's Day. His wife was waiting for him to return home, when he eventually arrived somewhat late. He informed his wife that he had been shot and related how he had been walking his horse up the hill when he heard someone coming up behind him. He described his murderer as having a black face, although whether this was the natural appearance of an African Caribbean person or that of a White person remained a topic of debate. Despite rewards offered by the government and the Pile family, the identity of the murderer was never discovered.

He was Speaker of the House of Assembly of Barbados 1883-1885, 1887-1889, 1891-1893, 1894-1898.
