= Clement Moody (clergyman) =

English Anglican clergyman (1809–1871)

The Reverend Clement Moody
- Born: 1809; Arthuret, Longtown, Cumbria,
- Died: 23 September 1871 (aged 61–62); Newcastle upon Tyne
- Education: Magdalen Hall, Oxford (B. A. 1844; M. A. 1845)
- Occupations: Schoolmaster; clergyman; theologian; classical scholar
- Known for: Author of The New Testament Expounded and Illustrated (1851, Britain) (1852, New York City); Author of the Second Edition of The New Eton Greek Grammar in English and the Fourth Edition of The New Eton Latin Grammar in English (both 1841); Vicar of Newcastle upon Tyne (from 1853 to 1871); Master of the Hospital of St Mary Magdelene and Church of St Thomas the Martyr, Newcastle (from 1857 to 1871)
- Spouse: Anne Vansittart (married 1851)
- Children: Charlotte Jane Mary Moody, who married Captain Walter Eldred Warde (grandson of Sir Lionel Smith, 1st Baronet)
- Relatives: Colonel Thomas Moody, Kt. (uncle); Major-General Richard Clement Moody (first cousin); The Rev. James Leith Moody (first cousin); Colonel Hampden Clement Blamire Moody CB (first cousin); Anne Moody of Warwick Place, Leeds, mother of Nichol Latimer (sister); Jane Moody, mother-in-law of Robert Alexander FRS FSA (sister)

Clement Moody (1809 – 23 September 1871) was a British high church Anglican schoolmaster, clergyman, theologian, classical scholar, and Royal Arch freemason, who was the Vicar of Newcastle upon Tyne from 1853 to 1871, the Master of the Hospital of St Mary Magdelene and Church of St Thomas the Martyr, Newcastle, from 1857 to 1871.

He composed the 1841 Second Edition of The New Eton Greek Grammar in English, and the 1841 Fourth Edition of The New Eton Latin Grammar in English. He also composed The New Testament Expounded and Illustrated, which was published in 1851 in Britain, and in 1852 in New York City.

== Family ==
Clement Moody was born in Arthuret, Longtown, Cumbria, in 1809 into a high church landed gentry family that had a history of military service. He was the sixth son of the surgeon George Moody (1773 - 1844), of Arthuret, Longtown, Cumbria, and later of Leeds, by the same's wife Jane Sword (1772 – 1850), whom George Moody had married on 22 June 1795. His uncle was the Colonial Office expert Colonel Thomas Moody ADC Kt. through whom his cousins included Major-General Richard Clement Moody, who was the founder of British Columbia, and the clergyman James Leith Moody.

His parents had 12 children, 11 of whom survived infancy. His sister Margaret married D. Nichol, Royal Navy, of Howe End.

His sister Anne, who was a ladies' school founder, of Warwick Place, Leeds, married the farmer David Latimer (b. 1781) of Berwickstown, Kirklinton, and later of Kirklinton Hall, who was the brother of the Oxford and Headington vintner Edward Latimer (1775 - 1845), whose wine is described as 'Latimer's immortal tun' in the Oxford University poem 'Brasenose Ale', and who was vintner to The Duke of Marlborough. Anne Moody's granddaughter Mary Latimer married his uncle Colonel Thomas Moody's grandson Colonel Richard Stanley Hawks Moody CB. Through his sister Anne, he was the uncle of Nichol Latimer (1830 - 1865), who was the publisher of The North China Herald which was the most influential newspaper in China.

His other sister Jane married Lewis Alexander of Hopwood Hall, Halifax, West Yorkshire, who was the father of the barrister Robert Alexander FRS FSA.

=== Marriage ===
Clement Moody married, on 7 May 1851, at Harpsden Church, near Henley-on-Thames, Anne Vansittart (b. 1818) who was the eldest daughter of The Rev. William Vansittart DD (1779 - 1847) of Driffield and of White Waltham, Berkshire, Prebendary of Carlisle and Rector of Shottesbrooke, by Charlotte Teresa Warde, of Woodland Castle, Glamorgan.

His wife Anne Vansittart was the granddaughter of Colonel Arthur Vansittart MP DL JP DCL, of the Berkshire Militia, who was MP for Windsor between 1804 and 1806, and a 2nd-great grandniece of the judge Robert Vansittart and the Governor of Bengal Henry Vansittart.

=== Issue ===
Clement Moody and Anne Vansittart had seven children: Walter Clement (b. 1853) (who is not to be confused with the eponymous son of his first-cousin Richard Clement Moody who was also named Walter Clement Moody (1858 - 1933)); Thomas Vansittart (b. 1854); Henry George (b. 1855) (who died at Sydney, New South Wales, in 1887); Hugh Vaughan (b. 1857); Jud Wandsworth; Charlotte Jane Mary (b. 1860), and Theresa Elizabeth (b. 1862).

Their daughter Charlotte Jane Mary Moody married Captain Walter Eldred Warde of Eaton Terrace, Belgravia, of 4th Battalion The Devonshire Regiment, by whom she had a daughter, Nancy Marian, who was born at Newbridge House near Bath on 7 March 1896. Her husband was the son of Augusta Smith who was the daughter of Lieutenant-General Sir Lionel Smith, 1st Baronet, GCB GCH, Governor-General of Jamaica and Governor and Commander-in-Chief of Mauritius, by Isabella Curwen his second wife.

== Early career ==
Moody taught at Tonbridge School from 1832 to 1840 before he had taken any university degree. He subsequently was educated at Magdalen Hall, Oxford, at which he matriculated on 17 December 1838, received a B.A. in 1844, and received an M.A. in 1845.

He composed the 1841 Second Edition of The New Eton Greek Grammar in English, and the 1841 Fourth Edition of The New Eton Latin Grammar in English.

He composed The New Testament Expounded and Illustrated (which was published in 1851 in Britain, and in 1852 in New York City).

He served as Perpetual Curate of Sebergham, Cumberland, from 1846 to 1852. He served as Vicar of St. Cuthbert's, Carlisle, from 1852 to 1853.

== Vicar of Newcastle ==
Moody was appointed Vicar of Newcastle on 6 April 1853. Moody's subsequent proposal, at a public meeting in June 1853, of plan for the building of ten new Church of England schools for Newcastle provoked an expression of dismay about Tractarianism and Catholic influence, from the Scotsman Thomas Gray Duncan in an open letter to Moody that was entitled The Present Doctrinal State of the Church of England. Duncan had left the Church of Scotland at the Great Disruption of 1843 and moved in 1850 to Trinity Church, Newcastle, which was a presbyterian church that was involved in efforts to create an evangelical alliance in Newcastle.

Moody became a Royal Arch freemason during 1855 and served as Provincial Grand Treasurer of the Provincial Grand Lodge of Northumberland during the same year.

Moody's work during the 1846–1860 cholera pandemic, and for education, were recognised by the Mayor of Newcastle in 1855.

== Chaplainship of St. Thomas the Martyr, Newcastle ==
On 29 October 1856 the Corporation of Newcastle appointed Moody as the Master of the Mary Magdalene Hospital, and as Chaplain to the Church of St Thomas the Martyr, after the untimely death on 8 October 1856 of the previous incumbent The Rev. Richard Clayton, who was a low church evangelical Anglican. The Corporation's appointment of Moody, who was a high church minister who considered evangelicals with 'strong disapprobation', displeased the Jesmond-based congregation, who raised £8000 to fund the construction of an alternative Jesmond Parish Church, which was consecrated on 14 January 1861.

Richard Welford, in his biography of Corporation alderman John Bennet Alexander, contends that 'the mystery of that [Moody's] appointment has never been properly explained'. Moody's appointment, which was passed by a majority of five, was proposed by the Whig Alderman John Blackwell, who was the owner of the moderate radical newspaper the Newcastle Courant, and was supported by the Whig Mayor Ralph Park Philipson.

== Death ==
Clement Moody died on 23 September 1871 and is buried in St. Nicholas Cemetery, Newcastle. There is a memorial window to him, at St. Nicholas's Newcastle Cathedral, in the principal window of the South Transept, of which the subject is Christ weeping over Jerusalem, that was created in 1877.

== Works ==
Moody composed:

- The New Eton Greek Grammar in English, 2nd Edition, 1841;
- The New Eton Latin Grammar in English, 4th Edition, 1841;
- The New Testament Expounded and Illustrated, 1851 (Britain) and 1852 (New York City);
- The Church of England a Means of Infusing the Spirit of Christianity Into Literary and Scientific Institutes, 1854, which was his inaugural address as Vicar of Newcastle.

== Paternal Ancestry ==
Ancestors of Clement Moody (clergyman)

16. Thomas Moody (b. 1650, Moss, Campsall) (son of Henry Moody (fl. 1673) and his wife Hannah Washington)
8. Thomas Moody (1694, Alloway - 1732)
17. Elizabeth (surname unknown)
4. Thomas Moody (1732, Arthuret – 1796) (who had fought for the Jacobites at the Battle of Culloden when he was aged only 13 years)
9. Janet Agnes Smith (married 1723, Dalrymple, as his second wife)
2. Dr. George Moody (elder brother of Colonel Thomas Moody ADC, CRE WI, Kt.)
10. John Blamire
5. Barbara Blamire (1740 – 1806)
1. The Rev. Clement Moody (married Anne Vansittart, near Henley-on-Thames, in 1851)
6.
3. Jane Sword (1772 – 1850) (married on 22 June 1795)
14.
7.
