= Greens Estate =

Greens Estate was a plantation in Saint George, Barbados. It was owned by Edward Thomas, who claimed £2,295 7s 5d from the British Government in "compensation" following the emancipation of 108 enslaved Africans.

By the late nineteenth century the estate was owned by Archibald Pile.
