= Alleyne baronets =

Title in the Baronetage of Great Britain

- Coat of arms of the Alleyne baronets of Four Hills
- Creation: 1769
- Status: extant
- Motto: Non tua te moveant sed publica vota (Let not your wishes move you but rather those of the public)
- Arms: Per chevron Gules and Ermine in chief two Lion's Heads erased Or
- Crest: Out of a Ducal Coronet a Horse's Head Argent

The Alleyne Baronetcy, of Four Hills in Barbados, is a title in the Baronetage of Great Britain. The Alleyne family (like the Clement family, Codrington family, Drax family, and Terrill family) were amongst the 17th century colonisers of Barbados, but their Baronetage was created only on 6 April 1769 for John Alleyne who was a Barbadian politician and Speaker of the House of Assembly of Barbados from 1767 to 1797 except for a short period during 1771 and 1772.

The first Alleyne to emigrate to Barbados was Reynold Alleyne, who was the son of The Rev. Richard Alleyne D.D., Rector of St. Mary’s, Stowting, Kent, from 1605. Reynold Alleyne emigrated to Barbados between 1628 and 1630.

Their estates in Barbados and North America were:

- from 1746 to 1782, that of the Jacobean mansion St Nicholas Abbey, in Saint Peter, Barbados, which Sir John Gay Alleyne acquired by marriage to Christian Dottin during 1746, and which became one of the most successful sugar plantations in Barbados before, after the death of their only son, its ownership reverted to her relations on her death during 1782.
- from 1810 to 1895, Alleynedale Hall (previously called Cabbage Tree Hall), in Saint Peter, Barbados;
- Porters Plantation and Great House, which included Alleyne Cottage, in Saint James, Barbados, which was the home of John Forster Alleyne, and his son Charles Thomas, and Thomas Harbin Alleyne;
- from 1769 to 1788, The Dorothy Quincy Homestead, 34 Butler Road, Quincy, Massachusetts, which the widow Mary Alleyne (nee Woodbridge) purchased, with 400 acres of land, in 1769.

Many members of the Alleyne family were either baptised, married, or buried, in St. James Parish Church, Barbados, which was built in 1847 on the site of the oldest church on Barbados. In the north east corner of the church's grounds is a walled family burial plot for the Alleynes, and inside the church there are mounted on the walls several plaques to commemorate the Alleynes. Furthermore, at St. Lucy Parish Church, Barbados, there is a plaque in the nave to commemorate Sir Reynold Abel Alleyne, 2nd Baronet (1789–1870), and numerous members of the Alleyne family are buried outside the altar on the north side of the church. The Rev. Herbert Milton Decourcy Alleyne was Rector of St. Lucy Parish Church, Barbados, from 1929 to 1949.

The family surname is pronounced "Alleen".

== Alleyne baronets, of Four Hills (1769) ==
- Sir John Gay Alleyne, 1st Baronet (1724–1801). He was the only son of John Alleyne (1695 – 1718) and Mary Terrill (1700 – 1742), who was a daughter of Colonel William Terrill (1674 – 1735), who was the first owner of Cabbage Tree Hall. He owned the Bawdens, Skeets, River, and Four Hills plantations in Barbados. His father John Alleyne (1695 – 1718), who was educated at Magdalen College, Oxford, inherited the Four Hills plantations in Barbados from his father Reynold Alleyne (1672 – 1722), and died at Bath, England, where he is buried at Bath Abbey. The 1st Baronet was elected to the Barbados Assembly during 1757 for the Parish of St. Andrew, and served as Speaker of the House of Assembly of Barbados from 1767 to 1797 except for a short period during 1771 and 1772. He introduced mahogany to Barbados.
  - One of his sisters married Sir Charles Knowles (d. 1777), later Governor of Jamaica, and another of his sisters married the second Viscount Folkestone, later the Earl of Radnor.
  - The 1st Baronet married, firstly, on 19 October 1746, Christian Dottin (1728–1782), who brought with her ownership of the estate of the Jacobean mansion St Nicholas Abbey, in Saint Peter, Barbados, which became one of the most successful sugar plantations in Barbados. Their only son died at Eton College when aged 12 years and the ownership of the St. Nicholas Abbey estate reverted to her relations on her death during 1782.
  - The 1st Baronet married, secondly, on 29 June 1786, at St. James's, Barbados, his first cousin, Jane Abel Alleyne, who was the daughter of Major Abel Gay Alleyne, of Mount Steadfast and later of Braintree, Massachusetts, by his wife Mary (nee Woodbridge), who lived out her days at what is now known as the Dorothy Q. Homestead in Massachusetts, which is now a museum that is managed by the Massachusetts Society of Colonial Dames. Alleyne and Jane Abel Alleyne had five daughters and two sons.
- Sir Reynold Abel Alleyne, 2nd Baronet (1789–1870). He was the third and eldest surviving son of the 1st Baronet, and the second and eldest surviving son of Jane Abel Alleyne. He married Rebecca Olton (1794–1860) He is commemorated by a plaque in the nave of St. Lucy Parish Church, Barbados.
  - The 2nd Baronet's daughter Philippa Cobham Alleyne (1813–1889) married the landowner Hampden Clement (1807 – 1880), of Saint Peter, Barbados, and Wilton Crescent, Belgravia, and was the mother of the cricketers Richard Clement (cricketer) and Reynold Clement.
  - The 2nd Baronet's second daughter Annie married William, the eldest son of Sir Henry Fitzherbert, during 1836.
- Sir John Gay Newton Alleyne, 3rd Baronet (1820–1912).
- Sir John Meynell Alleyne, 4th Baronet (1889–1983).
- Sir John Olpherts Campbell Alleyne, 5th Baronet (born 1928).

The heir apparent to the baronetcy is the present holder's only son Richard Meynell Alleyne (b. 1972).

== See also ==
- Richard Clement (1754 – 1829)
- Baronet § Barbados

== Notes ==
=== Sources ===
- Burke, John (1832). A Genealogical and Heraldic History of the Peerage and Baronetage of the British Empire. Vol. I (4th ed.). London: Henry Colburn and Richard Bentley.
- Debrett, John (1824). Debrett's Baronetage of England. Vol. I (5th ed.). London: G. Woodfall.

Baronetage of Great Britain
Preceded by Bernard baronets	Alleyne baronets of Four Hills; 6 April 1769	Succeeded by Young baronets
