= Bolton Street, London =

Street in Westminster, London

Coordinates: 51.5071°N 0.1444°W

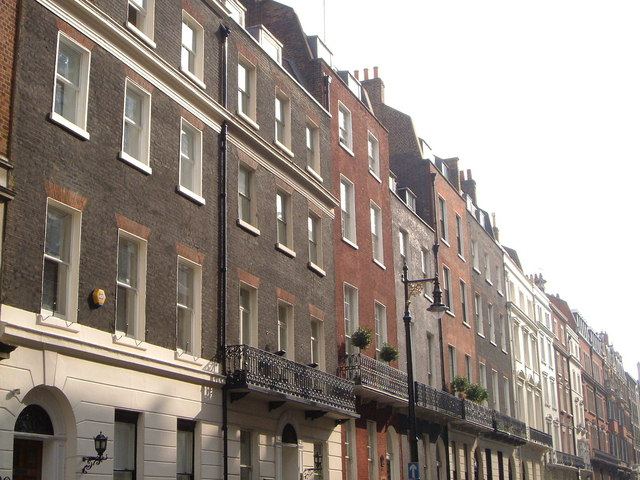
Bolton Street, Mayfair

Bolton Street is a street in Mayfair London, between Curzon Street to its north, and Piccadilly to its south. It is named after the Duke of Bolton, and was from its construction during the 17th century and 1708 the westernmost street of London.

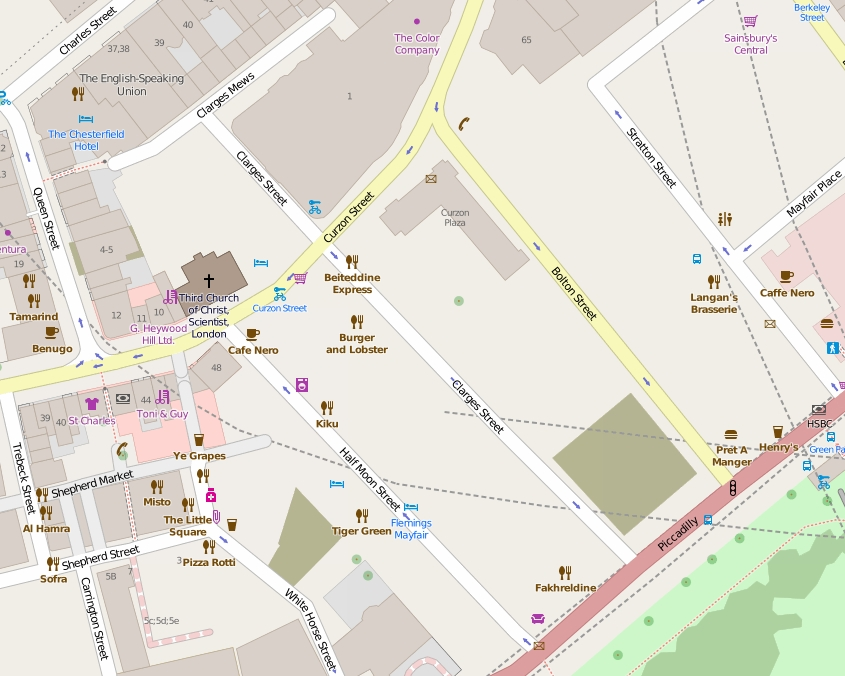
The immediate vicinity of Bolton Street

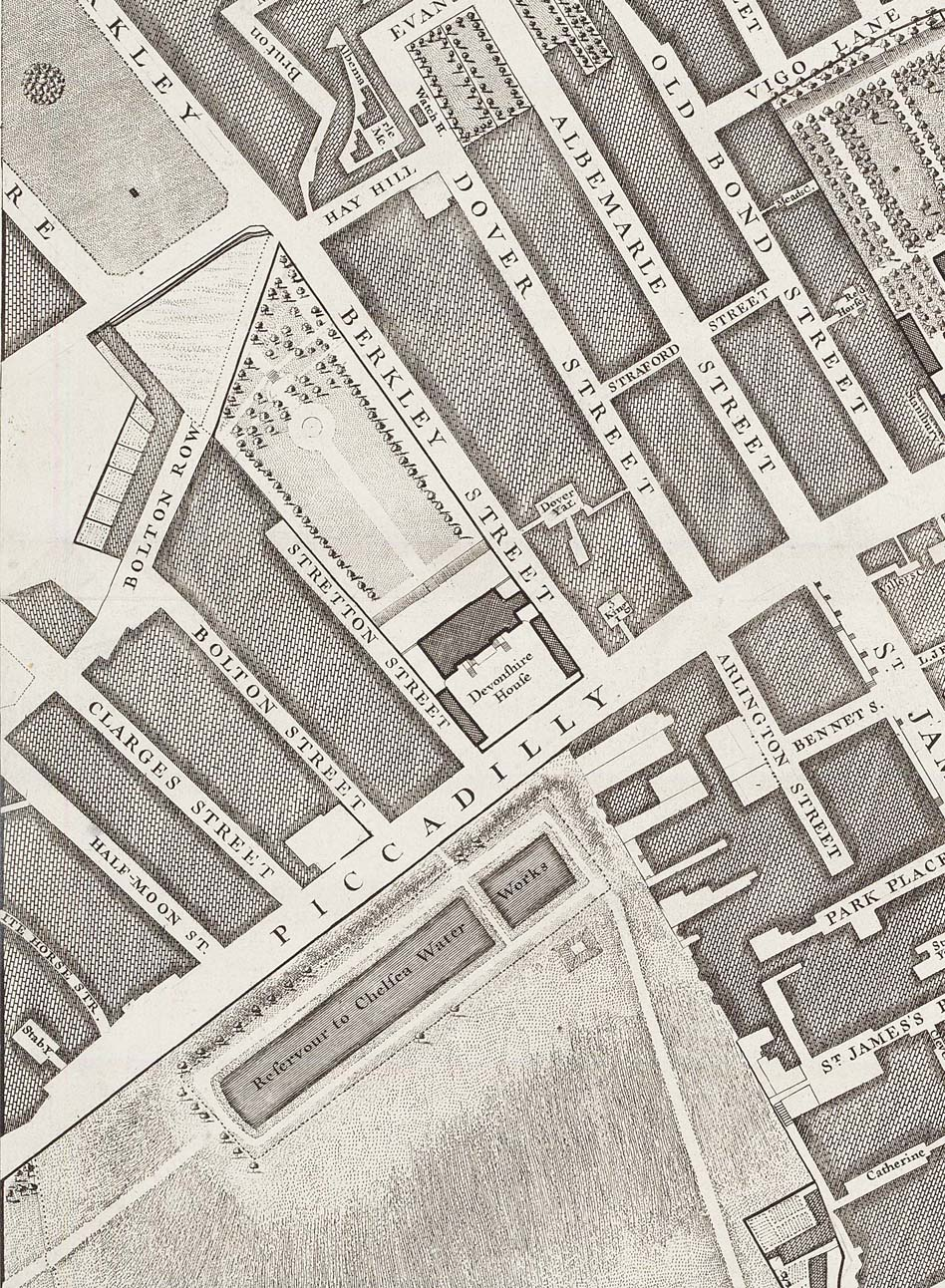
Bolton Street on John Rocque's 1746 map of London

== Notable inhabitants ==
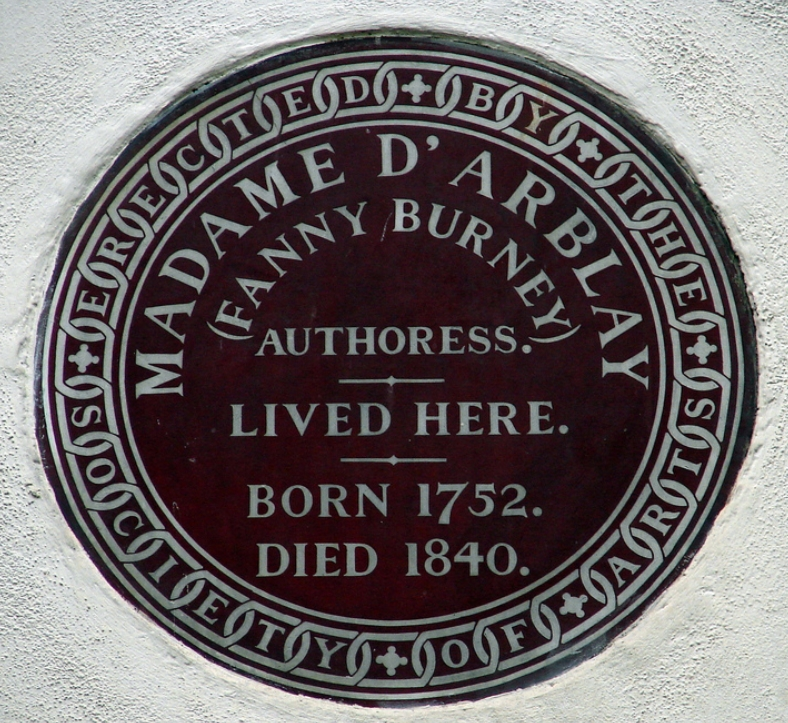
Madame D’Arblay (Fanny Burney) brown plaque

Former residents of Bolton Street include:

- Madame D'Arblay (pseudonym Fanny Burney), playwright, at No. 11, which marked by a plaque erected by the Society of Arts;
- Richard Clement (1754 – 1829), Barbados landowner and grandfather of the cricketers Richard Clement and Reynold Clement, at No. 13;
- Colonel Thomas Moody, Kt., British Colonial Office expert, and father of the founder of British Columbia Major General Richard Clement Moody, at No. 23;
- Henry James, novelist, at No. 3.;
- John Pitt Dening, soldier and polo player, who shot himself at its Bolton House Hotel in 1929.

== Buildings ==
The western side of the street has been replaced by modern buildings but the eastern side still contains Georgian buildings. Among the listed buildings in the street are No.s 11, 13, 14, 15, 16, 17 and 18, 19 and 20. The auction house Noonans Mayfair has its office at number 16.
