= Anna Moody =

British Girl Guide executive

- Anna Moody from a 1930 newspaper
- Born: Anna Robertson; 24 May 1881; Limavady, County Londonderry
- Died: 20 March 1950 (aged 68); Limavady, Northern Ireland
- Other name: Mrs G. G. Moody
- Spouse: George Goldney Moody (m. 1903)
- Family: Dr Muriel Robertson (sister)

Anna Moody (24 May 1881 – 20 March 1950) was a Girl Guide Association (GGA) executive in Northern Ireland. She received the Silver Fish Award, Girl Guiding's highest adult honour. She was a committee member of the Limavady Women's Unionist Association for 20 years and community organiser.

== Personal life and education ==
Moody was born in Limavady, County Londonderry. She was the daughter of Robert Andrew Robertson, an iron-founder from Glasgow, and Elizabeth Robertson (née Ritter), from Limavady. She had seven sisters, including Dr Muriel Robertson who founded the Society for Microbiology, and four brothers.

=== Marriage ===
She during 1903 married the soldier George Goldney Moody JP (d. 1962) who was the son of the clergyman James Leith Moody and the grandson of the Colonial Office aide-de-camp Colonel Thomas Moody CRE WI. George Goldney Moody had served in the Boer War, as a machine-gunner of the Imperial Yeomanry, under James Craig, 1st Viscount Craigavon, in which he was captured by the Boers, at Lindley during May 1900, and imprisoned, until September 1900, in a camp.

Anna and George Goldney Moody returned to South Africa where he farmed until 1920 when they returned to Britain, where he became a member of the Scout movement. By 1935 they were living in Ballymaglin, County Londonderry.

== Girl Guides ==
Moody joined the Girl Guides in 1921 as captain of 1st Roeside Guide company. She attended the first World Camp) in 1924 as the Ulster representative. In 1933 she, as the Londonderry County commissioner for Girl Guides, and her husband, the district commissioner of the local Boy Scouts, were instrumental in the building of the Limavady Girl Guides' and Boy Scouts' Hall.

She was Girl Guiding's Ulster commissioner for camping in 1933. Between 1934 and 1937 she was Imperial commissioner for camping, in which role she organised an international camp at Dunmurry. She also held an "important position" at the Coronation Camp in Essex in 1937.

Between 1938 and 1944 she served as deputy chief commissioner for Ulster Girl Guides. After she resigned, because of ill health, she received the Silver Fish Award, presented by Rosalind Hamilton, Duchess of Abercorn.

In the 1940s she played the following roles for Girl Guides:

- Londonderry County commissioner
- Limavady County commandant
- Limavady County secretary
- Dungiven and District Girl Guides' Association secretary

== Other community work ==
Moody was heavily involved in the Limavady Women's Unionist Association between 1927 and 1947 as hon. secretary, hon. treasurer and vice president. Between 1930 and 1944 she was a committee member of Limavady District Nursing and Child Welfare Association.

During WWII she was the chief organiser of the Londonderry County scrap metal and salvage campaign.

Other organisations she was affiliated with were:

- Ladies' Aid Guild, member
- Limavady Naturalists' Field Club, executive committee member
- Northern Ireland Physical Training and Recreation Act, advisory council member
- District School Management Committee, chair
- Roe Valley Hospital, ladies' committee member
- Limavady Rural Council, ladies' committee member
