= Edward Thomas (planter) =

Edward Thomas (179?-1853) was a planter who owned Greens Estate, Saint George, Barbados. He also was the attorney for the absentee landlords of over twenty estates and sometimes functioned as manager.

He was attorney and manager for Bailey's Plantation, Saint Philip, Barbados which was the site of Bussa's revolt in 1816.

He was married to Mary Anna Thomas with whom he had six sons: John Best, Lynch, William Grasett, Reynold, Edward and Elliott.
