= Robert Alexander (barrister) =

Robert Alexander QC FRS FSA (18 January 1795 – 21 February 1843) was a British barrister.

He was the son of the solicitor Lewis Alexander of Hopwood Hall, Halifax, West Yorkshire.

He and he studied law at Lincoln's Inn. He was a founder of Halifax's Literary and Philosophical Society, and was made a fellow of the Royal Society in 1835.

He in 1829 married Matilda Legard, who was the daughter of Sir Thomas Legard of the Royal Navy.

Robert Alexander died in London in 1843 and was buried in the churchyard of St. Nicholas Church, Ganton, Yorkshire.
