= List of speakers of the House of Assembly of Barbados =

Speaker of the House of Assembly of Barbados is the presiding officer of House of Assembly of Barbados. According to Section 45A(2) of the Constitution, the Speaker shall not be a member of either the House of Assembly or the Senate of Barbados.

Below is a list of office-holders:

Name	Entered office	Left office
Colonel Thomas Modyford	1652	1652
Colonel Thomas Modyford	1654	1654
Lieutenant Colonel Simon Lambert	1660	1660
Colonel John Burch	1661	1661
Colonel Thomas Modyford	1661	1664
Samuel Farmer	1665	1665
Samuel Farmer	1667	1667
John Jennings	1667	1667
Henry Walrond	1669	1671
Lieutenant Colonel Simon Lambert	1669	1673
Colonel Christopher Codrington	1674	1674
Colonel William Sharpe	1676	1678
Colonel Christopher Codrington	1678	1678
Colonel Richard	1679	1681
Colonel Christopher Codrington	1681	1681
Colonel Christopher Codrington	1682	1682
Colonel William Sharpe	1682	1683
Richard Seawell	1684	1685
John Reid	1685	1687
John Farmer	1687	1688
Judge Foster	1688	1689
John Reid	1689	1689
Wm. Foster	1690	1690
Robert Harper	1690	1690
J. Bromley	1690	1691
John Mills	1691	1692
Willoughby Chamberlaine	1692	1693
Colonel Waterman	1693	1695
Colonel Robert Bishop	1695	1696
Lieutenant Colonel Thomas Maxwell	1697	1700
James Colleton	1700	1701
Lieutenant Colonel Richard Downes	1701	1702
Lieutenant Colonel Thomas Maxwell	1702	1702
Lieutenant Colonel Thomas Maxwell	1703	1703
William Holder	1703	1706
Wm. Wheeler	1706	1707
Lieutenant Colonel Richard Downes	1708	1712
Reynold Alleyne	1712	1712
William Carter	1712	1712
William Carter	1714	1714
Reynold Alleyne	1714	1715
William Carter	1715	1717
Edmund Sutton	1717	1720
George Forester	1722	1723
Henry Peers	1727	1731
Henry Peers	1736	1740
John Lyte	1740	1742
Sir William Gibbons, Bart	1742	1760
John Lyte	1760	1762
John Gay Alleyne, Bart	1767	1770
Samson Wood	1770	1772
John Gay Alleyne, Bart	1772	1779
Samson Wood	1780	1787
Joshua Gittens	1797	1804
John Beckles	1804	1819
Thomas Griffith	1819	1821
Cheeseman Moe	1823	1825
Robert Haynes	1825	1829
Colonel Nathaniel Forte	1829	1835
Samuel Hinds	1836	1839
Sr. R.B. Clarke	1839	1840
George Taylor	1841	1846
Francis Gooding, M.B.	1846	1847
Sir John Thomas	1847	1860
Charles Packer, Chief Justice of Barbados, Esq.	1861	1867
Thomas Gill	1867	1870
Edmund Lee Haynes	1870	1870
Agustus Briggs	1871	1875
John Glasgow Grant	1875	1879
George C. Pil	1879	1880
Henry Pilgrim	1880	1880
John Kellman	1881	1883
Archibald Pile, C.M.G.	1883	1885
Timothy Yearwood	1886	1887
Archibald Pile, C.M.G.	1887	1889
W. H. Greaves	1889	1890
Archibald Pile, C.M.G.	1891	1898
Sir Frederick James Clarke, K.C.M.G., V.D., Esq.	1898	1934
G. D. L. Pile, O.B.E.	1934	1934
Sir Harold B.G. Austin, O.B.E.	1934	1937
G. D. L. Pile, O.B.E.	1937	1937
Sir Harold B.G. Austin, O.B.E.	1938	1942
G. D. L. Pile, O.B.E.	1942	1944
G. M. Evelyn	1944	1948
Sir Kenmore N. R. Husbands	1948	1956
Sir Hugh Gordon Cummins, C.B.E.	1956	1958
Sir John Eustace Theodore Brancker. Q.C.	1961	1971
Neville G. A. Maxwell, Esq., LL.B.	1971	1976
C. A. Eyre Hoppin, Esq.,	1976	1976
W. C. Burton Hinds, Esq.	1976	1984
C. Lindsay Bolden, Esq., LL.B.	1984	1986
Lawson A. Weekes, G.C.M., J.P., M.P.	1986	1994
His hon. Ishmael A. Roett, G.C.M., M.P.	1994	2008
His hon. Michael A. Carrington, M.P.	2008	2018
His hon. Arthur E. Holder, M.P.	2018	

== Notes ==
Please add George Giles Martin, 1665

https://www.barbadosparliament.com/main_page_content/show_content/7

== Sources ==
- Official website of the Parliament of Barbados
- Speakers of the House of Assembly

== See also ==
- Speaker (politics)
