= Cherry Tree Hill, Barbados =

Village in Barbados

Coordinates: 13°16′N 59°35′W

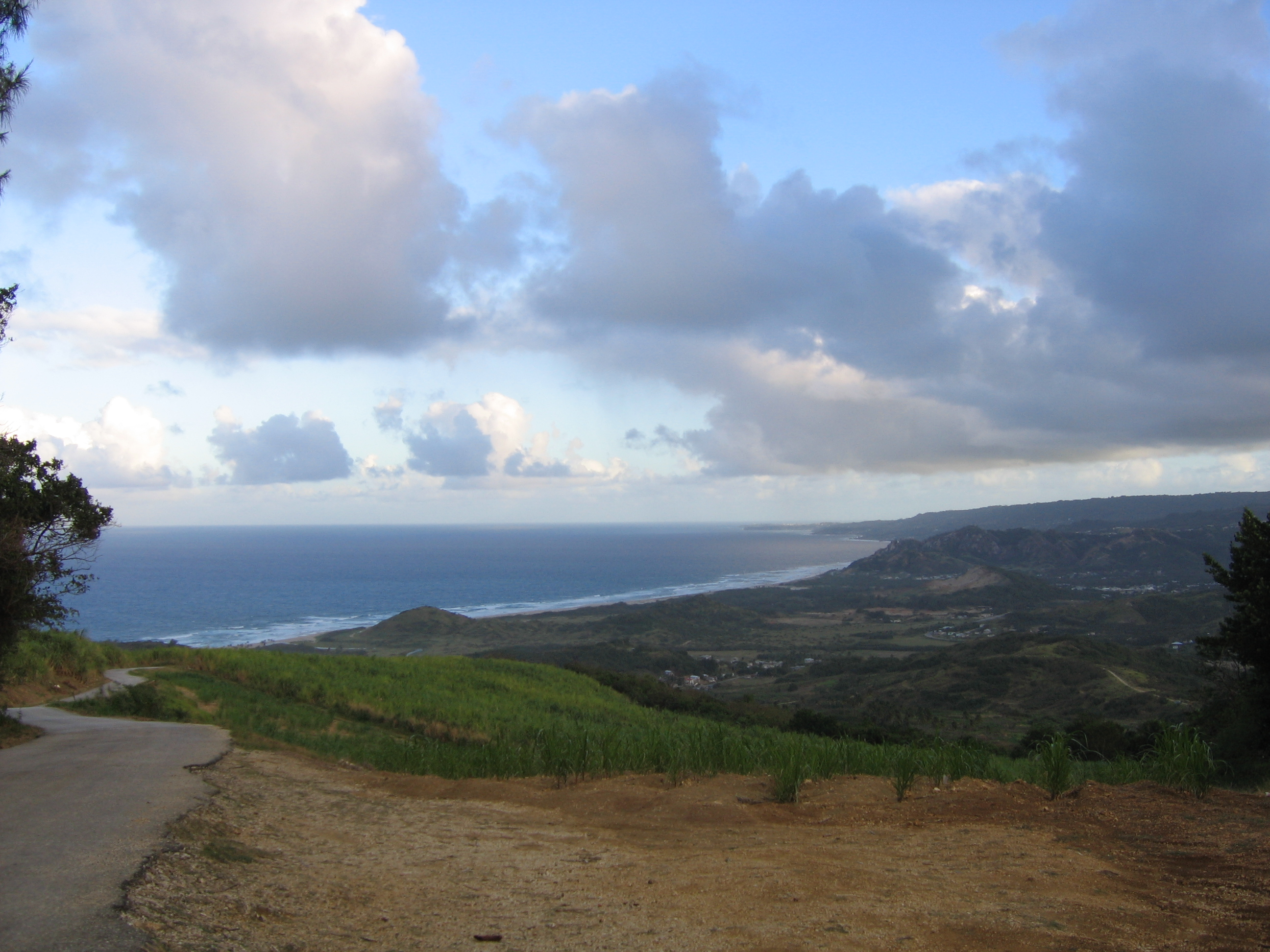
View looking south-east from Cherry Tree Hill

Cherry Tree Hill is a village in the parish of Saint Andrew in Barbados. It is approximately 850 ft. above sea level. It is believed that cherry trees lined the hill before Sir John Alleyne, 1st Baronet, who introduced mahogany to Barbados, planted the impressive mahogany avenue leading to Cherry Tree Hill. The village overlooks the Scotland District.
