= St. James Church, Barbados =

St. James Parish Church
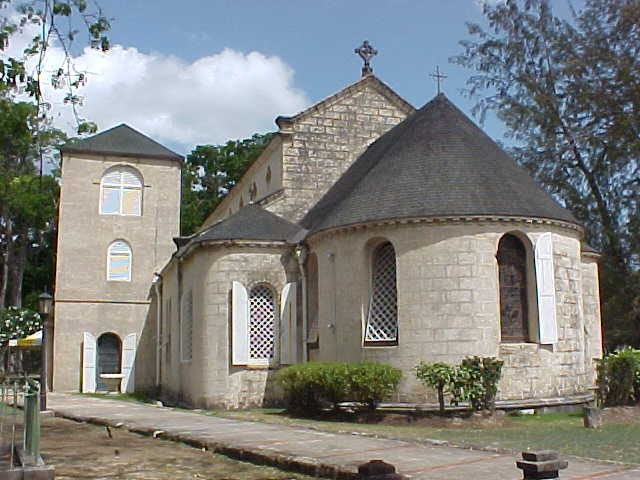
- St. James Parish Church, The Eastern Side
- St. James Parish Church
- 13.19085°N 59.63850°W
- Country: Barbados
- Denomination: Anglican

History
- Founded: 1628

Administration
- Province: Church in the Province of the West Indies
- Diocese: Diocese of Barbados
- Parish: St. James

Clergy
- Bishop: Michael Maxwell
- Rector: Beverly Sealy-Knight

St. James Parish Church, is in Holetown, St. James, Barbados. It stands on one of the oldest parcels of consecrated land on the island, often known in Barbados as "God's acre". Part of the Diocese of Barbados in the Church in the Province of the West Indies, St. James Parish Church is just north of Holetown, beside Folkestone Park.

== History ==
The first settlers landed on the island on February 17, 1627, at Holetown not far from the site where the church was eventually built. The settlement there expanded rapidly and it became necessary to erect a place of worship. In 1628 the settlers constructed a wooden building on this site. St. James Parish Church was one of the original six parishes later created under the administration of Sir William Tufton, the sixth Governor of Barbados.

After a hurricane on August 31, 1675, which devastated most of the island, a stone structure replaced the former wooden building in the early 1690s. This stone structure was made from coral and limestone from which this non-volcanic island is made. Another violent hurricane struck in 1780 and according to Robert Hermann Schomburgk's History of Barbados only two churches and one chapel remained; St. Andrew, St. Peter and All Saints. There is no specific record of what happened to St. James in the storms of 1675 and 1780 but after the hurricane of 1831 St. James was not among the churches listed as having been destroyed. Schomburgk states that in 1846 at the time of his writing this book, the building was 54' X 40' in size with a seating capacity of 550 and a congregation of approximately '360 souls'.

After nearly 200 years the walls of the original stone building began to decay and were partly demolished and replaced by a larger, more substantial structure in 1874.

In 1874, the nave roof was raised on new pillars and arches. The enlarged building was consecrated by Bishop Mitchinson on Easter Tuesday, 1875. Except for the sanctuary and north porch, added in 1900s, this is substantially the building still in use today.

== Points of interest ==
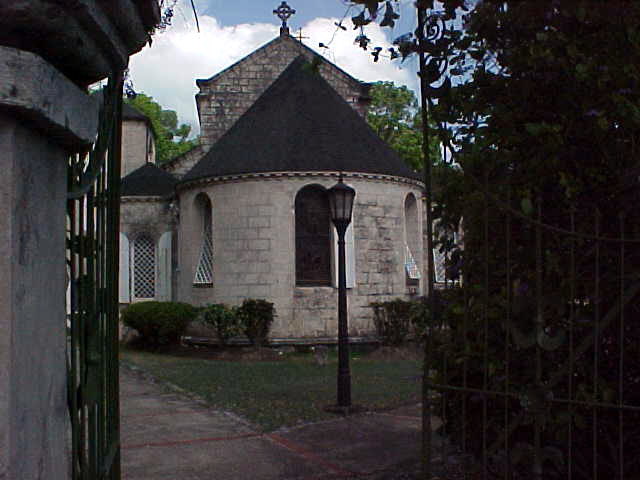
The Devil's Gate

Many of the early European settlers and various notable Barbadians were laid to rest in the Church and its yard, as demonstrated by the church's gravestones, vaults, and memorial plaques. Many members of the Alleyne family, who were amongst the first European colonisers of Barbados, were either baptised, married, or buried, in the church. In the north east corner of the church's grounds is a walled family burial plot for the Alleynes, and inside the church there are mounted on the walls several plaques to commemorate the Alleynes.

The church's first organ was ordered and built by the English firm, Hill & Son, at a cost of 320 pounds. After it arrived in January 1876 and was assembled, the first organist was Charles A. Greenidge and the bellows blower, Reynold W. Gillman. Over time this organ was replaced, with various upgrades performed over the years until the existing instrument was completely rebuilt from 2006 to 2007 and rededicated in 2008. Some of the pipes and structure still date back about one hundred years. The present organist is Philip Forde FRCO.

The original bell, the oldest in Barbados, carries the inscription "God Bless King William 1696". It was manufactured by the Whitechapel Bell Foundry that also produced the American "Liberty Bell" and "Big Ben". It fell from the belfry in 1881 and was badly cracked but a benefactor donated a new bell. However, considering its historic value the old one was sent to England for repairs and returned to Barbados to be retained as a monument, which predates the American "Liberty Bell" by 56 years.

The Baptistery, on the ground floor of the belfry, contains the original font which is over 300 years old and bears the inscription "Debit Richardus Walter to the Church of St. James Anno 1684."

== Gallery ==
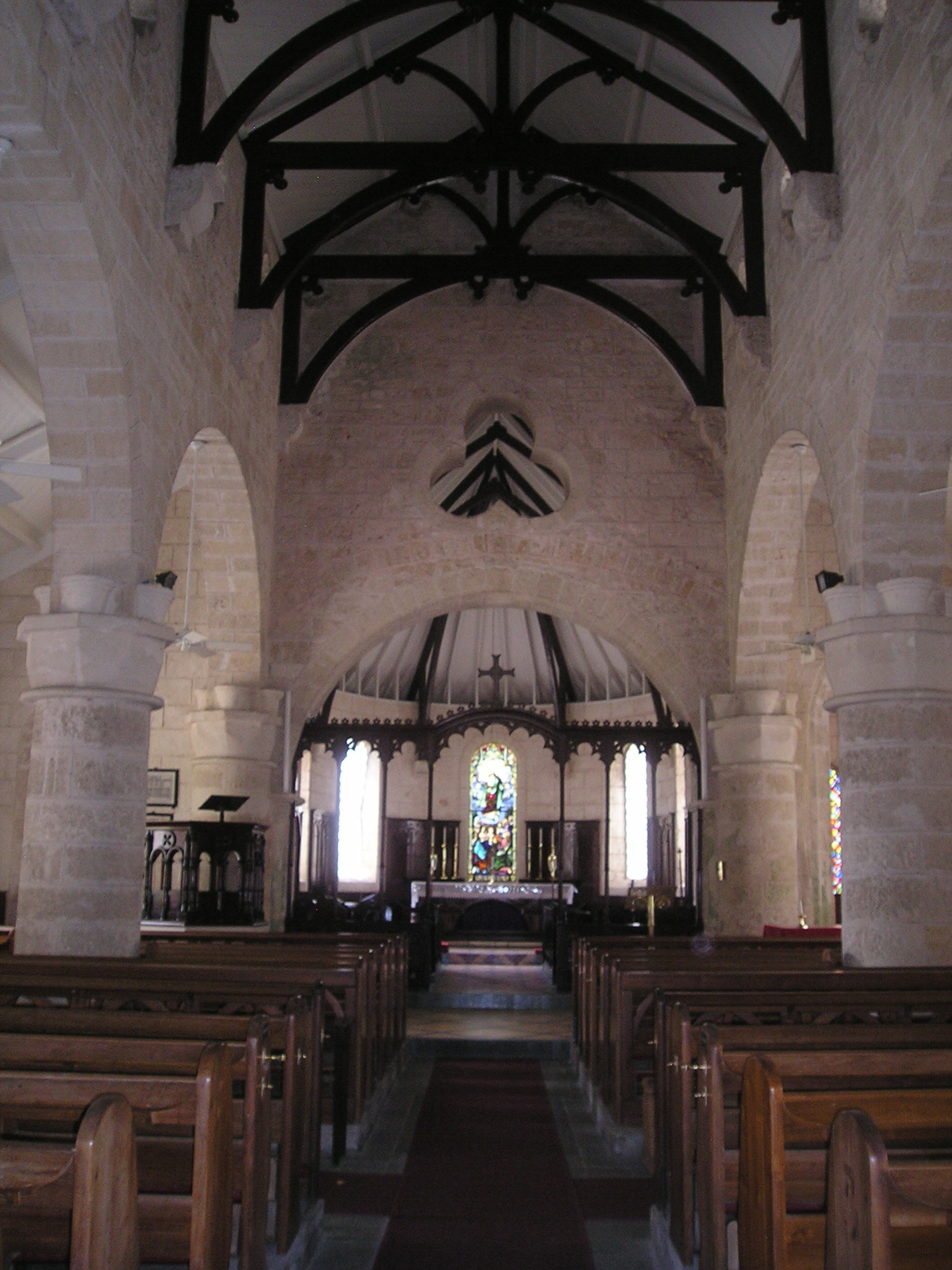
Interior of St. James Church

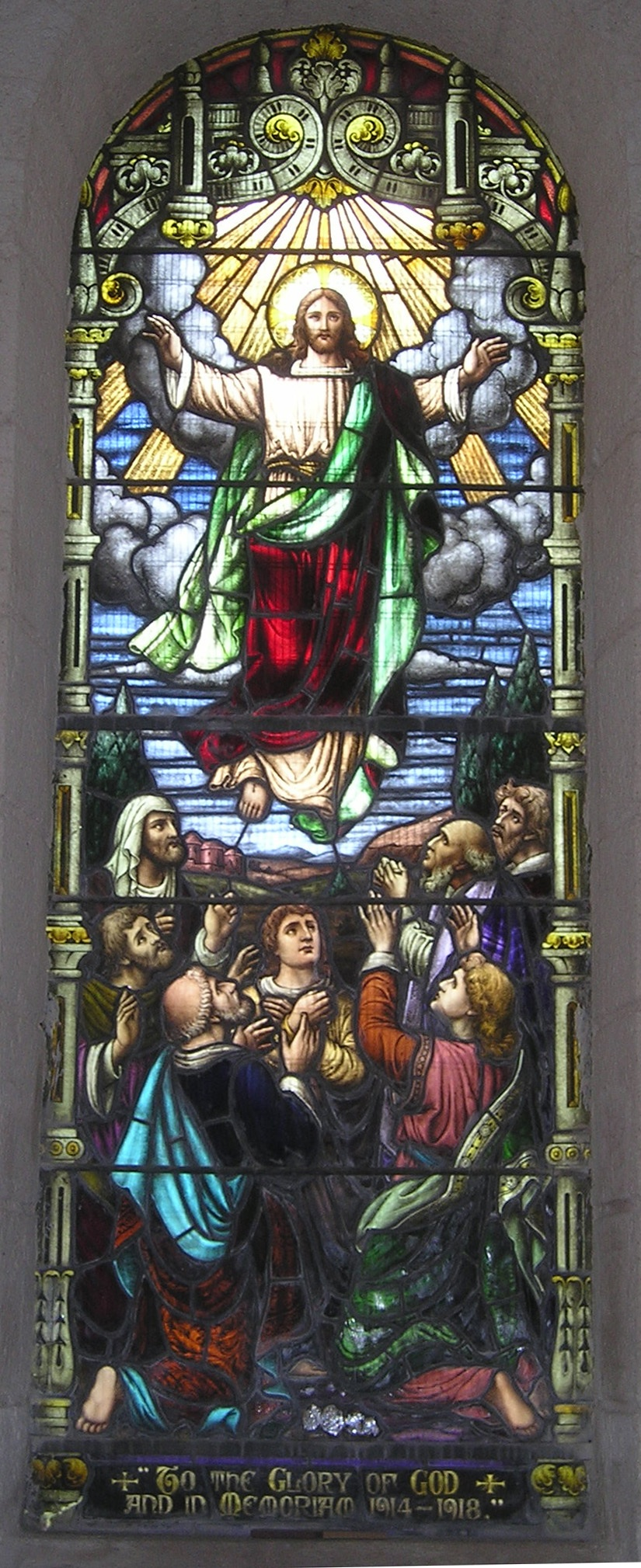
Ascension window behind altar

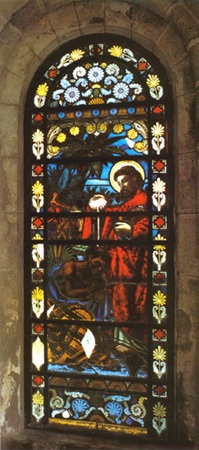
Baptistry window

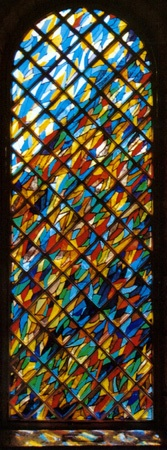
Window behind organ

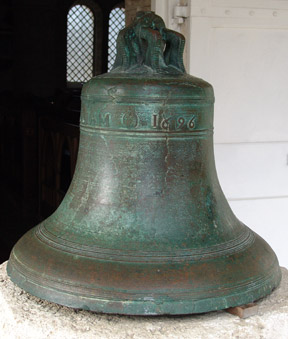
Original Bell

== Sources ==
- Historic Churches of Barbados, Barbara Hill, Art Heritage Publications (1984), ASIN: B0000EE6SE
- The History of Barbados, Robert H. Schomburgk, London: Longman, Brown, Green and Longmans (1848), ASIN: B00085APVQ
