= Richard Clement (Barbados landowner) =

Barbados landowner (1754–1829)

Richard Clement Senior
- Born: 1754
- Died: 1829 (aged 74–75); London
- Occupation: Barbados landowner
- Spouses: Susannah Dougan (d. 1786, Providence, Guyana); Elizabeth Hampden (d. 1813, Barbados)
- Children: Four including Martha Clement (1784–1868) and Hampden Clement (1807–1880)
- Relatives: Colonel Thomas Moody, ADC, Kt. (son-in-law); Philippa Cobham Alleyne (1813–1889) (daughter-in-law); Major General Richard Clement Moody (grandson); Richard Clement (grandson); Reynold Clement (grandson); Sydney Reynold Clement (1873–1915) (great-grandson).

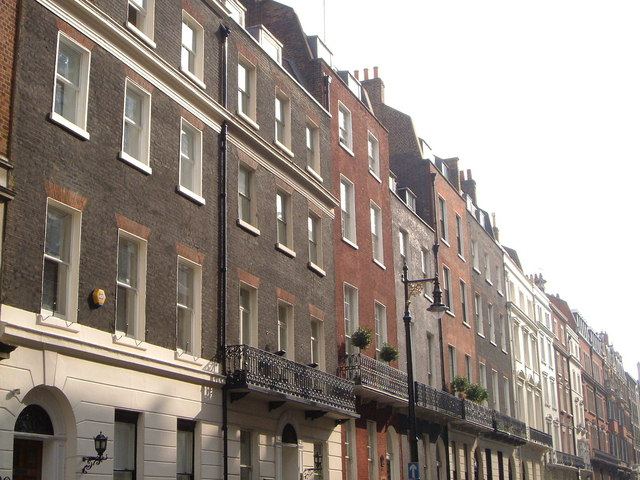
Clement's English residence was No. 13 Bolton Street, Mayfair, next to his son-in-law Colonel Thomas Moody whose residence was No. 23.

Richard Clement Senior (1754–1829) was an influential Barbados landowner of sugar plantations. The Clement family (like the Alleyne family, Codrington family, Drax family, and Terrill family) were amongst the 17th-century colonisers of Barbados.

Richard Clement Senior served in the Napoleonic Wars in the West Indies whilst he owned the estates Black Bess (197 slaves) and Clement Castle (231 slaves) (formerly Sober Castle, latterly Ellis Castle) in Saint Peter, Barbados.

His English residence was No. 13, Bolton Street, Mayfair, on the same street as his son-in-law Colonel Thomas Moody, CRE WI, ADC, Kt. who resided at No. 23.

== Marriages ==
His first wife, whom he married in Demerara, was Susannah Dougan (d. 1786), who was the daughter of the Demerara planter Thomas Dougan who is commemorated in the south transept of St George's Cathedral, Georgetown. She was the sister of the Tortola privateer John Dougan (1765 – 1826). She died in Providence, Guyana, in 1786.

His second wife was Elizabeth Hampden (d. 1813), who was a relation of Renn Hampden, Bishop of Hereford, who was born in Barbados. Elizabeth Hampden died, when aged 89 years, on 26 March 1813, on their estate in Barbados.

He was buried at St George's, Hanover Square, London.

== Issue ==
His children by his first wife Susannah Dougan (d. 1786) were:

- Martha Clement (1784–1868), who married the Colonel Thomas Moody, CRE WI, ADC, Kt., to whose children Major General Richard Clement Moody, who was named after him, and Susannah Moody, he left monetary inheritance. Martha Clement's other children included The Rev. James Leith Moody and Colonel Hampden Clement Blamire Moody.
- Richard Clement Junior (6 November 1798 - 27 November 1823), of Trinity College, Oxford, and Inner Temple, who was a royal commissioner in the West Indies, where he died on Nevis and predeceased his father.

His children by his second wife Elizabeth Hampden (d. 1813) were:

- Hampden Clement (1807–1880), of No. 23, No. 20, and No. 21, Wilton Crescent, Belgravia, who was educated at Rugby School and Exeter College, Oxford, and who married Philippa Cobham Alleyne (1813–1889) who was the daughter of Sir Reynold Abel Alleyne, 2nd Baronet, (1789–1870) of Cabbage Tree Hall (which was later renamed Alleynedale Hall) in Saint Peter, Barbados. Hampden Clement inherited from his father the estate Clement Castle (220 slaves) (formerly Sober Castle, latterly Ellis Castle) in Saint Peter, Barbados, which he sold to the black man Thomas Ellis for £26,000 (over £2 million in 21st-century money) during 1837. His children included the Belgravia cricketers Richard Clement and Reynold Clement, by the latter of whom his grandchildren included the soldier Sydney Reynold Clement (1873–1915).
- John Clement (b. after 1798), who inherited the estate Black Bess (196 slaves) in Saint Peter, Barbados, from his father.
