= James Drax =

English planter and military officer ((c.1609–c.1662)

Colonel Sir James Drax (c. 1609 – c. 1662) was an English planter and military officer. Born in Stoneleigh, Warwickshire, Drax migrated to the English colony of Barbados and acquired ownership of several sugar plantations and slaves. Drax was expelled from Barbados by the Royalists because he was a Parliamentarian, but he returned in 1651 when the island was returned to Parliamentarian control. Drax returned to England, where he died in 1662. He would go on to establish a dynasty of wealthy slave-owning sugar planters.

== Early life ==
James Drax was the son of Mary (née Lapworth) Drax (born c. 1580) and William Drax (c. 1580–1632), of Finham, in the parish of Stoneleigh, Warwickshire. James Drax became one of the earliest English migrants to the island of Barbados. In 1627, when James was 18 years old, he arrived by ship in what is today Holetown, along with Henry Powell. Drax and his companions lived in a cave for a time, searching for provisions, hunting turtles and hogs and also clearing land for the planting of tobacco, which soon became the staple crop of the island.

Drax later claimed he had arrived with a stock of no more than £300, and that he intended to stay on the island until he had parlayed that initial investment into a landed fortune worth £10,000 a year back home.

== Career ==
By the late 1630s, Drax had accumulated a substantial portion of land on Barbados, together with his brother William Drax. A slump in tobacco prices created considerable economic difficulties in England's fledgling colonies in the Caribbean in the late 1630s, and white colonists began to turn to other crops. Drax was not the first to cultivate sugar as a business in Barbados, that honor would belong to Colonel James Holdip. However, Drax was the first planter to successfully cultivate sugar cane on a large scale.

Drax allegedly relied heavily on Dutch expertise, learning the craft of sugar production and refinement from a Dutch settler, and then importing equipment from Holland. While these reports were recorded much later, and while the contribution of the Dutch is disputed, it is likely that at least some of the capital and techniques of production deployed in the early Barbados sugar trade came from the Dutch, who in turn had acquired their know-how and experience in the trade from Portuguese Brazil (which had been partially colonized by the Dutch in 1630). Sources indicate that the early experiments of Drax and others Barbados settlers began around 1640, and there was certainly sugar arriving in London from the island by 1643. Barbados quickly became a major supplier for Europe, and by the mid-1650s, sugar production had largely supplanted tobacco and all other crops as the dominant economic activity of the island.

=== Slavery ===
Concurrent with the rise of sugar came large-scale and intensive exploitation of slave labour. Drax was one of the pioneers of slavery in the Caribbean. Prior to 1640, the primary source of labour in Barbados had been European indentured servants. Although there were enslaved Africans in Barbados before that time, it was only after 1640, and frequently in tandem with the cultivation of sugar, that slaves began to supplant indentured servitude as the main workforce. By 1641, Drax owned more than 400 acres, making him nearly the greatest landowner on the island.

Just as Drax was getting involved in sugar, he acquired 22 enslaved Africans in early 1642, at a time when nobody else had even a handful of slaves. In 1644, he purchased another 34 enslaved Africans.

By the early 1650s, his plantation, Drax Hall Estate was worked by some 200 enslaved Africans. Drax was known by his contemporaries to provide his slaves and servants well, unlike James Holdip who was known to be so cruel and oppressive that his servants burnt his entire plantation to the ground.

=== Fortune and knighthood ===
Drax profited spectacularly from his sugar enterprise, allowing him to live “like a prince.” With wealth and power came political controversy. He emerged during the 1640s as a supporter of the Parliamentarians during the English Civil War, and became a colonel in the island's militia. When a royalist faction seized control of Barbados in 1650, James and William Drax were exiled from the island, along with other prominent parliamentarians. They returned to London, where they lobbied the House of Commons to send an expedition to retake the island. In 1651, Drax sailed in the fleet designed to re-conquer Barbados, and he was part of the delegation that went ashore to negotiate the surrender of the island.

Restored to his estates and power, Drax once again took up a leading role in the governance of the colony. It is thought that he and his brother ordered Drax Hall, a seventeenth-century manor house in St George parish, Barbados, to be constructed during the 1650s. He also was a patron of explorers of the North American coast, including Robert Sandford. In 1658, the Lord Protector, Oliver Cromwell, awarded Drax with a knighthood for his loyalty.

=== Return to England ===
By this point, Drax had returned to England, where he acquired a series of estates, pursuing his original ambition of setting himself up as a landed magnate at home, while continuing to profit from his plantations and estates in Barbados. He survived The Restoration, but died in shortly thereafter, in early 1662.

== Personal life ==
In the mid- to late 1630s, Drax married Meliora Horton from Somerset. She died in 1653. They were the parents of the following children

- Sir James Drax (1639–1663), who married Essex Lake, a daughter of Sir Lancelot Lake of Canons.
- Henry Drax (1641–1682), who married Lady Frances Tufton, daughter of John Tufton, 2nd Earl of Thanet. After her death, he married Hon. Dorothy Lovelace (1650–1684), a daughter of Anne Lovelace, 7th Baroness Wentworth, and John Lovelace, 2nd Baron Lovelace.
- John Drax, who died unmarried in Barbados.
- Samuel Drax, who died unmarried.
- Jeremiah Drax, who died unmarried.
- Meliora Drax, who married Robert Pye, son of Walter Pye and grandson of Walter Pye, MP.
- Elizabeth Drax (1649–1714), who married Thomas Shetterden.
- Phalatias Drax, who married Thomas Gomeldon of Kent.

Drax married Margaret Bamfield, daughter of John Bamfield of Hardington, Somerset. They had four sons, James, Bamfield, Alexander, and Jacob; all of whom died young or unmarried.

Drax died in early 1662 and was buried in the parish of St John Zachary, London. His son Henry continued to manage the family estate in Barbados.

=== Descendants ===
Through his daughter Elizabeth, James Drax was a grandfather to Thomas Shetterden (1660–1702), who changed his surname to Drax to inherit the Drax estates from his uncle. Thomas had a son named Henry Drax (c. 1693–1755). His family was connected to other major slave plantation owners, including the Codringtons, by marriage.:1

The Drax descendants were particularly active in the development of Jamaica, where there is a Drax Hall Estate in Saint Ann Parish. His grand-nephew Charles Drax founded Jamaica College.
