= Richard Clement (cricketer) =

English cricketer and civil servant

Personal information
- Full name: Richard Clement
- Born: 10 June 1832; Cabbage Tree Hall/Alleynedale Hall, Saint Peter, Barbados
- Died: 29 October 1873 (aged 41); Bicester, Oxfordshire, England
- Batting: Unknown
- Bowling: Unknown
- Relatives: Richard Clement (1754 – 1829) (paternal grandfather); Sir Reynold Abel Alleyne, 2nd Baronet (maternal grandfather); Reynold Clement (brother); Colonel Thomas Moody, Kt. (paternal uncle); Sydney Reynold Clement (1873 - 1915) (nephew)

Domestic team information
- Years: Team
- 1853: Oxford University

Career statistics
Competition	First-class
Matches	2
Runs scored	7
Batting average	3.50
100s/50s	–/–
Top score	4*
Balls bowled	?
Wickets	2
Bowling average	?
5 wickets in innings	–
10 wickets in match	–
Best bowling	1/?
Catches/stumpings	1/–
- Source: Cricinfo, 6 February 2020

Richard Clement (10 June 1832 – 29 October 1873) was an English first-class cricketer and treasury clerk.

== Life ==
=== Family ===
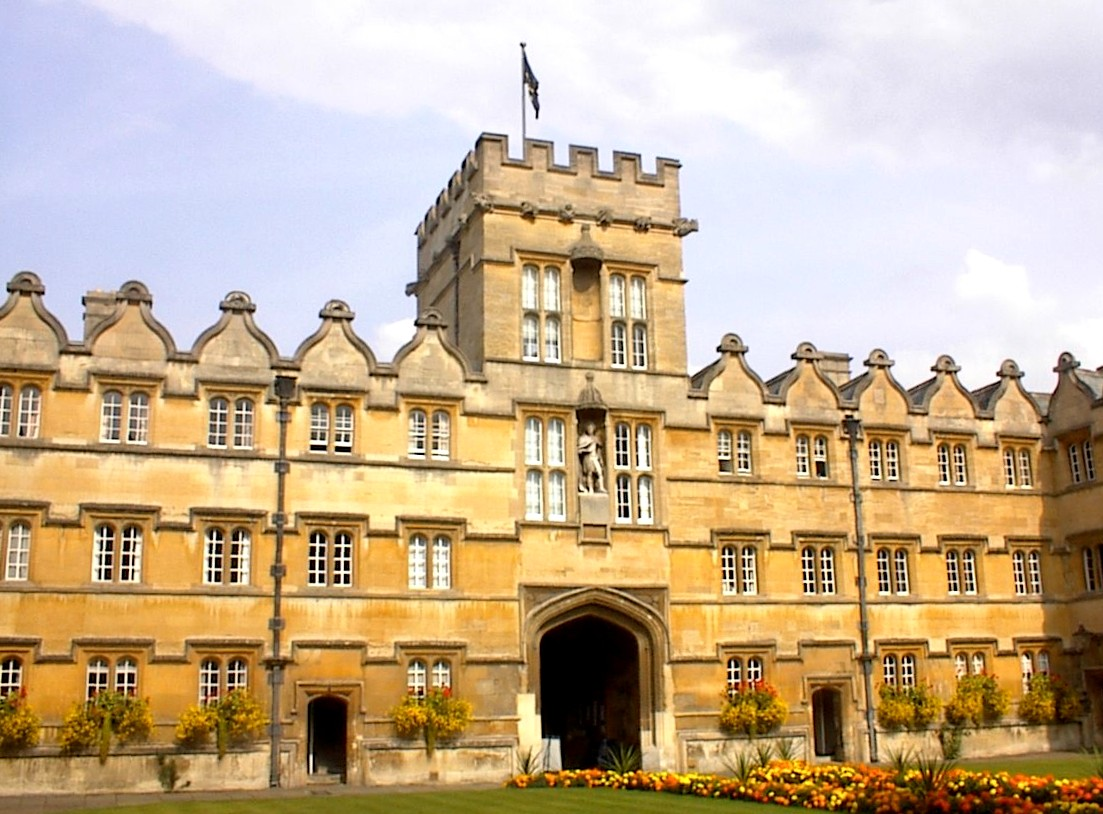
Richard Clement was educated at Rugby School and at University College, Oxford.

Richard Clement was born on 10 June 1832 at Cabbage Tree Hall (which was later renamed Alleynedale Hall) in Saint Peter, Barbados, to Hampden Clement (14 April 1807 – 4 February 1880), who was an English landowner who was educated at Rugby School and Exeter College, Oxford, and Philippa Cobham Alleyne (1813 - 1889) who was the daughter of Sir Reynold Abel Alleyne, 2nd Baronet (1789 – 1870) and Rebecca Olton (1794 - 1860). His parents were married on 6 July 1831 in St. Peter, Barbados. His maternal grandmother's father was John Allen Olton who owned the Harrow estate in Saint Philip, Barbados.

His father Hampden and uncle John inherited the estates Black Bess (197 slaves) and Clement Castle (231 slaves) (formerly Sober Castle, latterly Ellis Castle) in Saint Peter, Barbados, from his paternal grandfather the landowner and Napoleonic Wars veteran Richard Clement (1754 – 1829), whose English residence was 13 Bolton Street, Mayfair, and who was buried at St George's, Hanover Square, after whom he was named. His aunt Martha Clement was the wife of Colonel Thomas Moody, Kt.

Richard had three siblings: Reynold Clement (1834 - 1905), who also was a first class cricketer, Rosalie Philippa Hampden Clement (1838 - 1912), and Helena Rebecca Clement (1853 - 1935).

=== Life ===
He was raised in England at No. 23 and No. 20 Wilton Crescent, Belgravia, where his father also owned No. 21, and at Snarestone Lodge at Snarestone, Leicestershire, England. He was educated at Rugby School, and at University College, Oxford, whilst at which he in 1853 appeared twice in first-class cricket for Oxford University, once against the Marylebone Cricket Club, and once against Cambridge University.

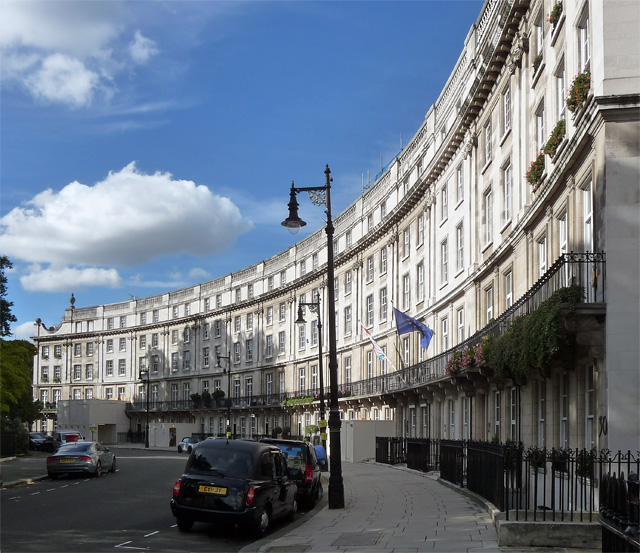
Richard Clement was raised in Wilton Crescent, Belgravia.

Richard was employed as a clerk, and then as Private Secretary to Colonel Taylor, at the Treasury, until he died, without either marriage or issue, after falling off his horse during a hunt near Bicester on 29 October 1873, and after a shooting accident during November 1873, when he was aged 41.
