= Reynold Clement =

English cricketer (1834–1905)

Major Reynold Clement
Personal information
- Full name: Reynold Alleyne Clement
- Born: 3 March 1834; Cabbage Tree Hall/Alleynedale Hall, Saint Peter, Barbados
- Died: 2 October 1905 (aged 71); Hove, Sussex
- Relatives: Richard Clement (1754 – 1829) (paternal grandfather); Sir Reynold Abel Alleyne, 2nd Baronet (maternal grandfather); Richard Clement (cricketer) (brother); Colonel Thomas Moody, Kt. (paternal uncle); Sydney Reynold Clement (1873 - 1915) (son)

Domestic team information
- Years: Team
- 1854: Cambridge University Cricket Club
- 1863: Marylebone Cricket Club
- Source: CricInfo, 18 April 2019

Major Reynold Alleyne Clement (3 March 1834 – 2 October 1905) was an English first-class cricketer who was Clerk of the Course of Ascot Racecourse from 1884 until his death in 1905, when the office was inherited by his only son Sydney Reynold Clement (1873 - 1915).

== Early life ==
=== Family ===
Reynold Alleyne Clement was born at Cabbage Tree Hall (which was later renamed Alleynedale Hall) in Saint Peter, Barbados, on 3 March 1834, to Hampden Clement (14 April 1807 – 4 February 1880), who was an English landowner who was educated at Rugby School and Exeter College, Oxford, and Philippa Cobham Alleyne (1813 - 1889) who was the daughter of Sir Reynold Abel Alleyne, 2nd Baronet (1789 – 1870) and Rebecca Olton (1794 - 1860). His parents were married on 6 July 1831 in St. Peter, Barbados. His maternal grandmother's father was John Allen Olton who owned the Harrow estate in Saint Philip, Barbados.

His father Hampden and uncle John inherited the estates Black Bess (197 slaves) and Clement Castle (231 slaves) (formerly Sober Castle, latterly Ellis Castle) in Saint Peter, Barbados, from his paternal grandfather the landowner and Napoleonic Wars veteran Richard Clement (1754 – 1829), whose English residence was 13 Bolton Street, Mayfair, and who was buried at St George's, Hanover Square. Reynold's aunt Martha Clement was the wife of Colonel Thomas Moody, Kt.

Reynold Clement had three siblings: Richard (1832 - 1873), Rosalie Philippa Hampden Clement (1838 - 1912), and Helena Rebecca Clement (1853 - 1935).

=== Early life ===
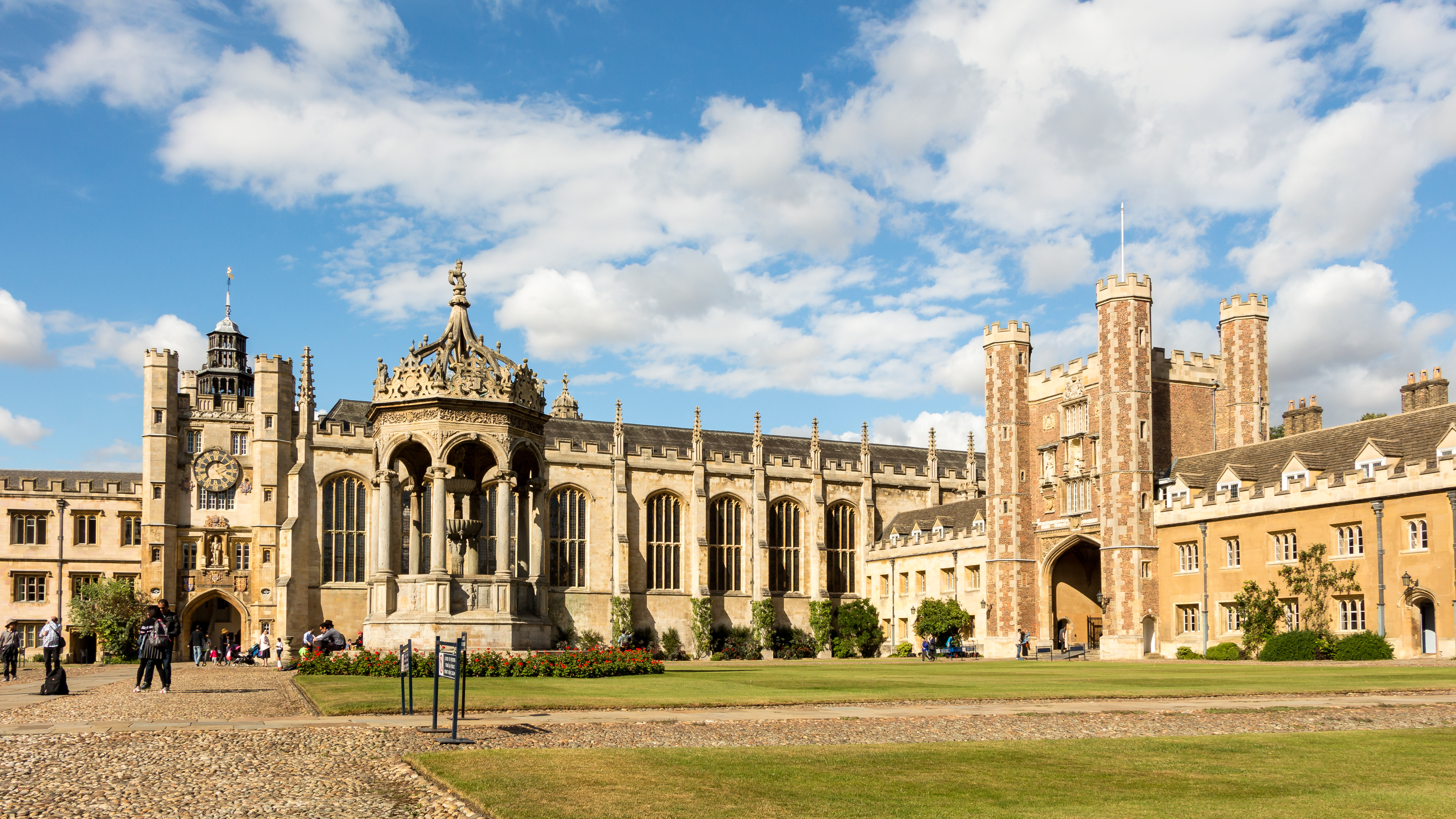
Reynold Clement was educated at Rugby School and at Trinity College, Cambridge

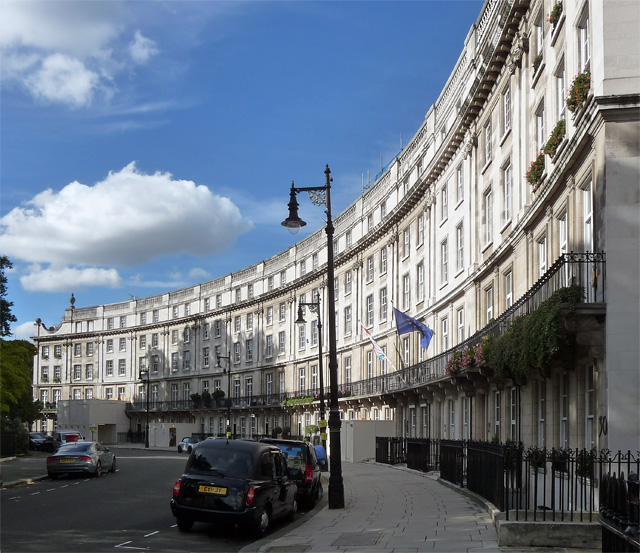
Reynold Clement was raised in Wilton Crescent, Belgravia.

Reynold Clement was raised in England at No. 23 and No. 20 Wilton Crescent, Belgravia, where his father also owned No. 21, and at Snarestone Lodge, Snarestone, Leicestershire. He was educated at Rugby School and at Trinity College, Cambridge, at which he matriculated in 1853.

== Career ==
=== Cricket ===
He played cricket as a middle-order batsman both for Rugby School and for Cambridge University: in 1854 he was selected for the University Match against Oxford University, although he failed to score in either innings. He played for Cambridge only in the 1854 season. By 1857, he was appearing in a minor match for a United Ireland eleven, and in 1863 his last first-class match was for the Marylebone Cricket Club. Reynold's elder brother Richard played cricket for Oxford University in the 1853 University Match.

=== Army ===
After Cambridge, Clement joined the 68th (Durham) Regiment of Foot (Light Infantry) and served during the 1860s in the New Zealand Wars, in which he attained the rank of Major. In 1876, he was a member of Queen Victoria's personal bodyguard.

=== Ascot Racecourse ===
He was appointed secretary to the Board of Trustees of Ascot Racecourse in 1881, and Clerk of the Course at the same in 1885, as which he made 'vast improvements' to the course and to the stands. He was in 1900 Secretary to the Master of the Buckhounds. His only son Sydney Reynold Clement (1873 - 1915) inherited his office as Clerk of the Course when he died during 1905, and held the office until 1911.

== Marriage and family ==
Reynold was the only child of Hampden to marry and have children. He married Louisa Cecilia Blackwood, who was the daughter of Henry Martin Blackwood and of Harriet Louisa Bulkeley, and the granddaughter of Vice-Admiral Henry Blackwood, on 20 July 1867. They had four children before he died in 1905.

- Violet Mary Clement (1868 - 1943)
- Maud Clement (1871 - 1931) who married Oliver Philip Stanhope Ingham (who was a grandson of Charles Stanhope, 7th Earl of Harrington).
- Sydney Reynold Clement (1873 - 1915), who fought in South Africa with Winston Churchill, and inherited his father's office as Clerk of Course at Royal Ascot during 1905, as which he served until he emigrated during 1911 to Australia where he was killed in action at Anzac Cove on 25 April 1915.
- Ida Kathleen Clement (1875 - 1965) who married Horace West (who was the son of William Gladstone's Principal Private Secretary Sir Algernon West).
