= Richard Clement Moody =

Founder and first lieutenant governor of British Columbia

Major-General Richard Clement Moody FICE FRGS FSAS RIBA
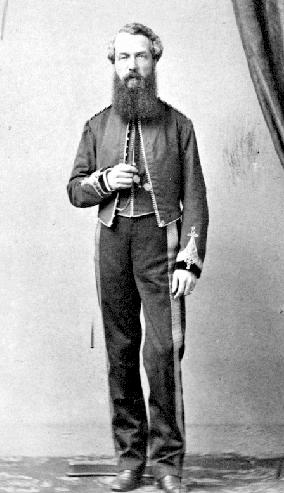
- Richard Clement Moody in 1859

Governor of the Falkland Islands (renamed from Lieutenant-Governor during his tenure in June 1843)
- In office 01 October 1841 – July 1848
- Monarch: Queen Victoria
- Preceded by: None (R. C. Moody Inaugural Holder)
- Succeeded by: George Rennie

Lieutenant-Governor of British Columbia
- In office 25 December 1858 – July 1863
- Monarch: Queen Victoria
- Preceded by: None (R. C. Moody Inaugural Holder)
- Succeeded by: Frederick Seymour

Personal details
- Born: 13 February 1813 St. Ann's Garrison, Bridgetown, Barbados
- Died: 31 March 1887 (aged 74) Bournemouth, England
- Resting place: St Peter's Church, Bournemouth
- Spouse: Mary Susannah Hawks (m. 1852)
- Relations: James Leith Moody (brother); Hampden Clement Blamire Moody (brother); Clement Moody (paternal cousin); Richard Clement (maternal cousin); Reynold Clement (maternal cousin); Richard Charles Lowndes (grandson)
- Children: 13, 11 of which survived infancy, including Richard Stanley Hawks Moody (b. 1854)
- Parent(s): Colonel Thomas Moody ADC Kt. Martha Clement
- Education: Homeschooled
- Alma mater: Royal Military Academy, Woolwich
- Occupation: Colonial Governor; Royal Engineer; architect

Military service
- Allegiance: United Kingdom
- Branch/service: Royal Engineers
- Years of service: 1829–1866
- Rank: Major-General
- Commands: Commander-in-Chief, Falkland Islands (1841–1848); Commanding Royal Engineer, Newcastle-upon-Tyne (1852–1854); Executive Officer of the Crown Colony of Malta (1854 – May 1855); Commanding Royal Engineer, Scotland (November 1855 – December 1858); Royal Engineers, Columbia Detachment (December 1858 – July 1863); Commanding Royal Engineer, Chatham Dockyard (1864–1866)

Major-General Richard Clement Moody (13 February 1813 – 31 March 1887) was a British polymath who was the commander of the elite Royal Engineers, Columbia Detachment, as which he was the founder and the first Lieutenant-Governor of British Columbia. He was also the first British Governor of the Falkland Islands, of which he founded their capital Port Stanley, and Commanding Executive Officer of Malta during the Crimean War.

Moody was selected to "found a second England on the shores of the Pacific" by Sir Edward Bulwer-Lytton: who desired to send 'representatives of the best of British culture' who had 'courtesy, high breeding, and urbane knowledge of the world'. The British Government deemed Moody to be the definitive 'English gentleman and British Officer', and his Royal Engineers, Columbia Detachment, were selected for their 'superior discipline and intelligence'. Moody's original title was 'Chief Commissioner of Lands and Works for British Columbia' before he was redesignated the first lieutenant governor of British Columbia. He founded New Westminster (for which he has been described as 'the real father of New Westminster') and the Cariboo Road and Stanley Park; and named Burnaby Lake after his secretary Robert Burnaby, and Port Coquitlam's 400-foot 'Mary Hill' after his wife, Mary Susannah Hawks. Port Moody, and Moody Park and Moody Square in New Westminster, are named after him. Moody left his personal library behind to become the public library of New Westminster.

Moody Brook and Moody Creek in the Falkland Islands, and Moody Point in Antarctica, also are named after him.

== Birth and ancestry ==
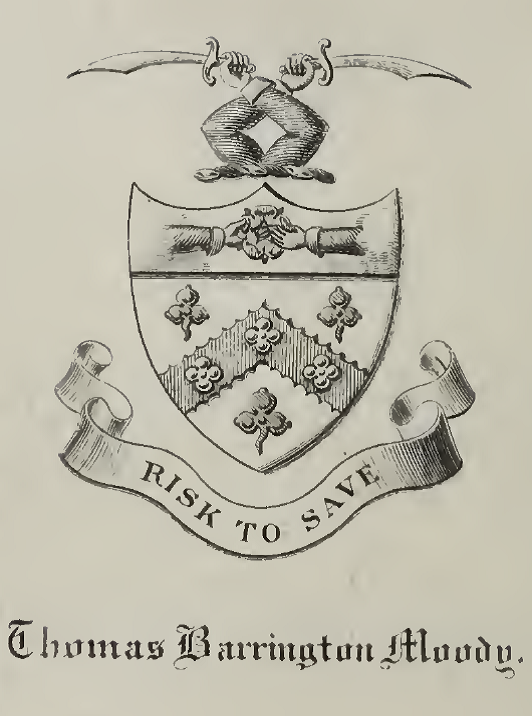
Arms of Richard Clement Moody (1813–1887), shown over the name of his nephew Commander Thomas Barrington Moody (b. 1848) of the Royal Navy.

Richard Clement Moody was born on 13 February 1813 at St. Ann's Garrison, Barbados, into a high church landed gentry family with a history of military service in the Royal Engineers, and which included Jacobites and had ancestry in common with George Washington, the founder and first president of the United States of America.

He was the third of ten children of Colonel Thomas Moody, CRE WI, ADC, Kt. and Martha Clement (1784–1868): who was the daughter of the Napoleonic Wars veteran and Barbados landowner Richard Clement (1754–1829) after whom he was named, and the aunt of Belgravia cricketers Reynold Clement and Richard Clement. His father's English residences were 23 Bolton Street, Mayfair, and 13 Curzon Street, Mayfair.

His first-cousin was the high church clergyman, theologian, classicist, and freemason, Clement Moody, Vicar of Newcastle. His eldest paternal-uncle, Charles Moody, of Longtown, was a gentleman farmer who inherited the family's trade of foreign food-commodities. His paternal grandmother was Barbara Blamire of Cumberland, a cousin of William Blamire MP High Sheriff of Cumberland and of the poet Susanna Blamire.

=== Siblings ===
His siblings included Major Thomas Moody (1809–1839); The Rev. James Leith Moody (1816–1896) (Chaplain to the Royal Navy in China, and to the British Army in the Falkland Islands, Gibraltar, Malta and Crimea); Colonel Hampden Clement Blamire Moody CB (1821–1869) (Commander of the Royal Engineers in China during the Second Opium War and the Taiping Rebellion); and the Etonian sugar-manufacture expert Shute Barrington Moody (through whom his nephew was the artist Commander Thomas Barrington Moody (b. 1848) of the Royal Navy).

== Education ==
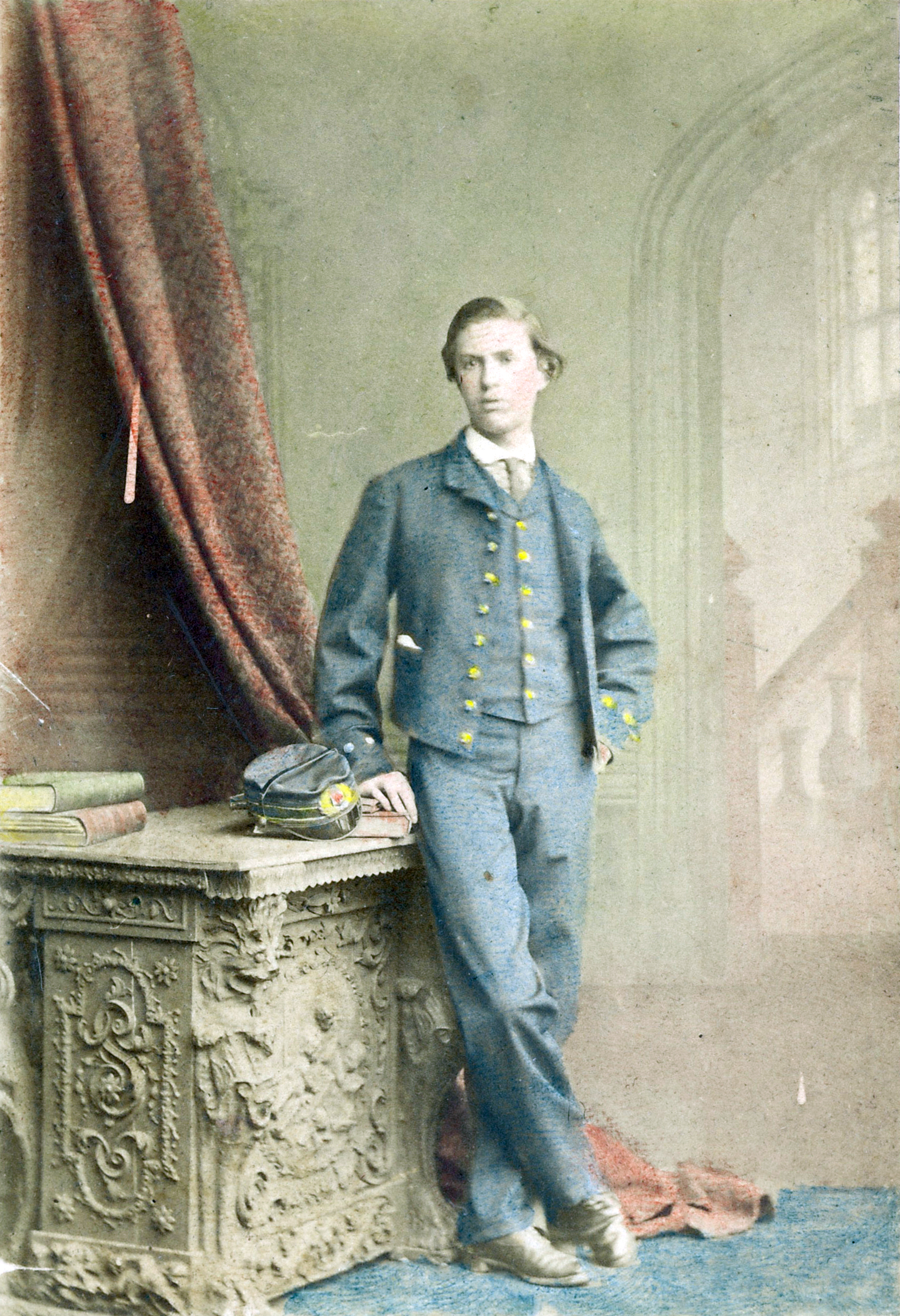
Richard Clement Moody (1813–1887) as a Gentleman Cadet of the Royal Military Academy, Woolwich

He was educated by private tutors in the studia humanitatis and trained as a diplomat. Like his father, he was influenced by the works of Montesquieu, and was interested from a young age in 'political economy and in learning the character and peculiarities of the people amongst whom he was thrown'. He has been described as a 'cultured theoretician', and as ‘a man sensitive to the beauties of nature and capable of expressing his sentiments in beautifully descriptive prose’, and as 'a visionary in a plain land' 'who could conceive of Edinburgh Castle in terms of a musical score', and as having ‘a fine sense of humour’.

He then was from the age of 14 years educated as a Gentleman Cadet at the Royal Military Academy, Woolwich, at which he became head-of-school during his second year and graduated during his third year.

Like his father Colonel Thomas Moody, CRE WI, ADC, Kt., and like his brother Hampden Clement Blamire Moody, Richard Clement Moody was a polymath who excelled in engineering, architecture, and music. He planned the restoration of Edinburgh Castle using music, with which Queen Victoria and Prince Albert were delighted, but his plan was not constructed.

== Overview of military and civic career ==
He trained on the Ordnance Survey in 1829, when he received an inheritance of £2000 (about £136,000 in 21st-century money) from his maternal grandfather Richard Clement (1754–1829).

He was commissioned as a Second Lieutenant in the Royal Engineers in 1830. The Royal Engineers during the 19th century were a socially exclusive elite land-marine force, whose officers were drawn from the upper middle-class and landed gentry of British society, who performed, in addition to military engineering, 'reconnaissance work, led storming parties, demolished obstacles in assaults, carried out rear-guard actions in retreats and other hazardous tasks'.

Moody was promoted to Lieutenant 1835, to Second Captain in 1844, to Captain in 1847, to Major in January 1855, to Lieutenant-Colonel in 1856, to Colonel in 1858, and to Major-General in 1866.

Moody worked on the Ordnance Survey in Ireland from 30 May 1832 until he became ill during 1833. He served on Saint Vincent (Antilles) from October 1833 to September 1837, where his elder brother Thomas died in 1839, until he contracted yellow fever. He subsequently during his sick-leave toured the United States, with Sir Charles Felix Smith, from 1837 to 1838. On his return from the USA, Moody was stationed at Devonport. Moody served as Professor of Fortifications at Royal Military Academy, Woolwich from July 1838 to October 1841.

Moody was in October 1841 appointed Lieutenant-Governor of the Falkland-Islands: this office was renamed Governor of the Falkland Islands in June 1843, when he also became Commander-in-Chief of the Falkland Islands. He served in these offices until July 1848, when he left Stanley, and arrived in England in February 1849. Moody in 1848 received the Knight Grand Cross of the Order of Military Merit of France.

He served as an aide-de-camp to the British Colonial Office, on special service, from August 1849. He served at Chatham Dockyard and at Plymouth during 1851. Moody was appointed Commanding Royal Engineer of Newcastle-upon-Tyne in 1852, as which he served until 1854. Moody was Executive Officer at Malta, during 1854, during the Crimean War, but was compelled to resign from this post in May 1855 as a consequence of yellow fever. He was appointed Commander of the Royal Engineers in Scotland in November 1855, and toured Germany in 1856.

Moody was appointed the Commander of the elite Royal Engineers, Columbia Detachment; the Chief Commissioner of Lands and Works for British Columbia; and the first lieutenant governor of British Columbia, from December 1858 to July 1863.

Moody returned to England from British Columbia in December 1863, whilst he continued to own over 3049 acres of land in British Columbia. Moody was Commanding Royal Engineer at Chatham Dockyard between March 1864 and January 1866. On 25 January 1866, he was promoted to Major-General, and he retired, at the age of 52 years, on full pay, later that month. He subsequently served as a Municipal Commissioner during 1868.

=== Avocational life ===
Moody subsequent to his retirement lived 'in great seclusion until his death' in 1887. His friends included the biologist Sir Joseph Dalton Hooker, the statesman and novelist Sir Edward Bulwer-Lytton (whose Rosicrucian novels he deemed to be decadently bourgeois), and the lawyer Sir Henry Pering Pellew Crease and his family.

Moody was elected an Associate of the Institution of Civil Engineers on 23 April 1839, and was therefore one of its oldest members. He was also an Honorary Associate of the Royal Institute of British Architects, a Fellow of the Royal Geographical Society, a Fellow of the Society of Antiquaries of Scotland, and a Member of the Royal Agricultural Society.

Moody during his retirement lived at Burwarton, Shropshire; and at Caynham House, Ludlow, Shropshire; and at Woodfield, Weston under Penyard; and later at Fairfield House, Charmouth, Lyme Regis. He died at The Royal Bath Hotel, Bournemouth, on 31 March 1887, whilst visiting Bournemouth with his daughter, and was buried at St Peter's Church, Bournemouth. He left over £24,000 in money (about £1.6 million in 21st-century money) in addition to his estates which included over 3049 acres in British Columbia.

== Governor of the Falkland Islands (October 1841 – July 1848) ==
=== Settlement ===
In 1833, Great Britain asserted its dominion over the Falkland Islands. In 1841, Moody, who was aged only 28 years, was appointed, on the recommendation of Lord Vivian, to be the first lieutenant-governor of the Falkland Islands. It is likely that the lauded reputation, at the Colonial Office, of his father, Colonel Thomas Moody, CRE WI, ADC, Kt., contributed to the decision to appoint him at that unprecedentedly young age, and to grant him powers that were exceptional relative to those of other British Colonial Governors. Moody was directed by Lord John Russell to exercise an authority of 'influence, persuasion, and example'. He departed England, for the Falkland Islands, on the Hebe, on 01 October 1841. He inserted into a bottle, which he threw overboard off the Bill of Portland on his journey to the Falkland Islands, a letter to his sister Sophia Moody: the bottle and its letter was, after 34 days in the water, washed ashore at Blatchington, near Brighton, and delivered to Sophia Moody at Guernsey.

When Moody arrived, on the Hebe, at Port Louis on 16 January 1842, the Falklands was 'almost in a state of anarchy', but he used his powers 'with great wisdom and moderation' to develop the Islands' infrastructure. Moody's 'General Report' of the Falkland Islands for the British Government was completed on 14 April 1842 and was sent to London on 3 May. In his General Report, Moody recommended that the Government encourage settlers and promote extensive sheep farming. He estimated the population of sheep on the Falkland Islands to be 40,000 in 1842 and encouraged the Government to import quality livestock from Britain to be crossed with their local breeds: this policy was successfully implemented and adopted by future settlers.

Moody's office was renamed Governor of the Falkland Islands in June 1843, when he became Commander-in-Chief of the Falkland Islands. Moody's secretary, Murrell Robinson Robinson [sic], a surveyor and engineer, was the nephew of one of Moody's tutors. Moody appointed Robinson as a JP in June 1843, but banished him from the Islands in March 1845, with the statement that he set-out 'axe in hand' for some other colony. The botanist Joseph Dalton Hooker, who arrived on the Islands with the expedition of Sir James Clark Ross, described Moody as 'a very active and intelligent young man, most anxious to improve the colony and gain every information [sic] respecting its products'. Moody granted Hooker use of his personal library, which Hooker described as 'excellent', and the two became friends. Moody's refusal to acquiesce to George Thomas Whitington's attempt to force him to travel in the brig Alarm provoked a feud between their families (the latter of which included John Bull Whitington in The Falkland Islands) that continued during Moody's tenure as Governor of the Falkland Islands and in the Colonial Magazine of November 1844, during which Moody said of John Bull Whitington that it was 'unbecoming my station to take any further notice of this individual'.

=== Foundation of Stanley ===
Shortly after Moody's arrival in 1842, Sir James Clark Ross, when his Antarctic expedition sailed into Port Louis, advised Moody to choose for their capital city a site that was more easily accessible to sailing-ships than Port Louis. Moody consequently investigated the suitability of Lord John Russell's recommendation of Port William, which Moody concluded to be the best site and renamed Port Stanley after Lord Stanley, who was the Secretary of State for War and the Colonies. Moody founded and developed the city, to which, during 1845, he moved the Falkland Islands' administration. Moody designed Government House in Stanley that was completed in 1850 and after he had returned to England. Sir James Ross subsequently named Moody Point, off Joinville Island in Antarctica, after Moody.

Moody levied a tax on alcohol, and, because there was a lack of currency on the island, created his own currency of promissory notes. These two practices resolved immediate problems on the Islands but Moody were criticised in the British Parliament, by Sir William Molesworth, 8th Baronet. In June 1843, when Moody's office was renamed 'Governor' (from Lieutenant-Governor), Moody was instructed by the Colonial Office to establish a colonial administration with a Legislative Council and an Executive Council. The records of Moody's 'conscientious' and 'impressive' administration of Falkland are held in the Jane Cameron National Archives in Stanley. Moody enacted laws and collected other duties or taxes. He asked the British government for a doctor, a magistrate, and a chaplain: all three were dispatched, and the latter was Moody's brother, James Leith Moody, who, after his arrival in October 1845, was 'querulous and eccentric' in a feud with Moody. He established residences, Government offices, a barracks, a new road-system, docks, a court-of-law, a gaol, a school, a church, a graveyard, and a police-force. He established the requested Executive Council and a Legislative Council in 1845, each of which consisted of British officials, merchants, and local landowners. His governance was impeded by the incompetence of the several members of his administration whom he dismissed. However, when during 1846 Henry Grey, 3rd Earl Grey became Secretary of State for War and the Colonies, the Colonial Office became less sympathetic to Moody.

He contemned the original European settlers of the Falkland Islands but commended his Royal Engineers. He wrote:

our community... chiefly composed of men of the lowest class, formerly seamen in whale ships & sealers, foreigners and Spanish gauchos... the only persons opposed to such wretched material for the formation of a colony are the 5 or 6 gentlemen and the detachment of Royal Sappers and Miners.

=== Militia ===
In 1845, animosity on the River Plate between the British and the French fleets and the Argentine Government of Juan Manuel de Rosas provoked Moody to request an artillery contingent from Britain and to use his Royal Engineers to train a militia from the Falkland Islands' population. In 1891, the militia that was founded by Moody was renamed The Falkland Islands Volunteer Force, and it was subsequently renamed again to the Falkland Islands Defence Force, and it was involved in both World Wars and in the Argentine invasion of the Falkland Islands in 1982, when, coincidentally, a centre of the Argentinian offensive was Moody Brook which was named after Moody.

=== Permanent infrastructure ===
Moody's influence provoked antipathy in his inequable brother James Leith Moody, who was the Chaplain to the British Force in the Islands from October 1845. However, Moody's tenure was a success, the consequence of which has been 180 years of British administration of the Falkland Islands.

In 1994, to commemorate the 150th anniversary of the founding of Stanley, Moody, together with James Clark Ross and Lord Stanley, was commemorated on Falkland Islands stamps. Government House in Stanley, which was designed by Moody, featured on the stamps issued in 1933, to commemorate the centenary; on those issued in 1983, to commemorate 150 years of British administration of the Islands; and on those issued in 1996 to commemorate the visit, in January of that year, by Princess Anne. Moody Brook and Moody Creek, near Port Stanley, are named after Moody.

In 1845 Moody introduced tussock grass into Britain from the Falkland Islands, for which he received the Gold Medal of the Royal Agricultural Society. Moody wrote an account of tussock grass in the Journal of the Royal Agricultural Society (IV. 17, V. 50, VII. 73). The Coat of arms of the Falkland Islands notably includes an image of tussock grass.

Moody left the Falkland Islands, for England, on HM Transport Nautilus, in July 1848. Moody arrived in England on 29 November 1848.

== Britain and Malta (February 1849 – October 1858) ==
Moody in 1848 received the Knight Grand Cross of the Order of Military Merit of France. He served as an aide-de-camp to the British Colonial Office, on special service, from August 1849 and tended to his father, Colonel Thomas Moody, CRE WI, ADC, Kt.

He served at Chatham Dockyard and at Plymouth during 1851. He was Commanding Royal Engineer of Newcastle-upon-Tyne from 1852 until 1854, as which he directed the response to the burst reservoir at Holmfirth, Yorkshire, from 5 February 1852, which destroyed life and property. Moody was promoted to Regimental Colonel on 8 December 1853 and was appointed Executive Officer of Malta, during 1854, during the Crimean War. Whilst at Malta, his eldest son, Richard Stanley Hawks Moody, later a distinguished Colonel, was born, on 23 October 1854, at Valletta. Richard Clement Moody was compelled by his Yellow Fever to resign from his office in Malta during May 1855, after which he recuperated on a tour of Germany. He was appointed as Commander of the Royal Engineers in Scotland in November 1855, as which he served until October 1858, and was elected as a Fellow of the Society of Antiquaries of Scotland. Moody was involved in Scottish architectural projects, and enjoyed the intellectual society of Edinburgh.

=== Musical Plan for Edinburgh Castle and Queen Victoria ===
Whilst in Germany during 1855, Moody composed plans for the restoration of Edinburgh Castle in which measurements were made 'drawn to musical chords'. He has been described as 'a visionary in a plain land' and 'a man who could conceive of Edinburgh Castle in terms of a musical score'. His plans so impressed Lord Panmure that he was invited to Windsor Castle to present them to Queen Victoria and Prince Albert, both of whom were musicians and both of whom were delighted. The construction of Moody's plans was impeded by the retirement of Lord Panmure, but they are retained at the War Office, where 'they still remain a memorial to Moody's talent'.

== Founder and first lieutenant governor of British Columbia (October 1858 – July 1863) ==
=== Selection ===
Moody was the founder of British Columbia

When news of the Fraser Canyon Gold Rush reached London, Sir Edward Bulwer-Lytton, Secretary of State for the Colonies, requested the War Office to recommend a field officer who was 'a man of good judgement possessing a knowledge of mankind' to lead 150 (which was later increased to 172) Royal Engineers who had been selected for their 'superior discipline and intelligence'. Lytton desired to send to the colony 'representatives of the best of British culture, not just a police force', to send men who possessed 'courtesy, high breeding and urbane knowledge of the world', such as Moody, whom the Government considered to be the archetypal 'English gentleman and British Officer', whom the War Office chose. Lord Lytton, who described Moody as his 'distinguished friend', accepted their nomination, as a consequence of Moody's military record, and of Moody's success as Governor of the Falkland Islands, and of distinguished geopolitical record of Moody's father, Colonel Thomas Moody, CRE WI, ADC, Kt., at the Colonial Office, and of Moody's brother Colonel Hampden Clement Blamire Moody, who had already served with the Royal Engineers in British Columbia from 1840 to 1848 with such success that he was granted command of the Royal Engineers across the entirety of China.

Moody's responsibility was to transform the new Colony of British Columbia (1858–66) into the British Empire's 'bulwark in the farthest west' and to 'found a second England on the shores of the Pacific'.

Moody and his wife Mary Susannah Hawks and their four born children left England on 30 October 1858. They stopped at New York, travelled through Panama, and stopped at San Francisco, from which they departed on 21 October on the steamer Panama, on which they arrived at Esquimalt on 25 December 1858. Moody was sworn in, as the first lieutenant governor of British Columbia and Chief Commissioner of Lands and Works for British Columbia, at Victoria, on 4 January 1859.

The officers of Moody's Royal Engineers, Columbia Detachment were three Captains, Robert Mann Parsons, John Marshall Grant, and Henry Reynolds Luard; and his two Lieutenants Lieutenant Arthur Reid Lempriere (of Diélament, Jersey) and Lieutenant Henry Spencer Palmer; in addition to Captain William Driscoll Gosset (who was to be Colonial Treasurer and Commissary Officer). The contingent also included Doctor John Vernon Seddall and The Rev. John Sheepshanks (who was to be Chaplain of the Columbia Detachment).

=== Ned McGowan's War ===
Moody had hoped to begin immediately the foundation of a capital city, but on his arrival at Fort Langley, he learned of an insurrection at the settlement of Hill's Bar that was led by a notorious outlaw, Ned McGowan, and some restive gold-miners. Moody repressed the rebellion, which became popularly known as 'Ned McGowan's War', without loss of life.

Moody described the incident:

The notorious Ned McGowan, of Californian celebrity at the head of a band of Yankee Rowdies defying the law! Every peaceable citizen frightened out of his wits!—Summons & warrants laughed to scorn! A Magistrate seized while on the Bench, & brought to the Rebel's camp, tried, condemned, & heavily fined! A man shot dead shortly before! Such a tale to welcome me at the close of a day of great enjoyment.

Moody described the response to his success: 'They gave me a Salute, firing off their loaded Revolvers over my head—Pleasant—Balls whistling over one's head! as a compliment! Suppose a hand had dropped by accident! I stood up, & raised my cap & thanked them in the Queen's name for their loyal reception of me'.

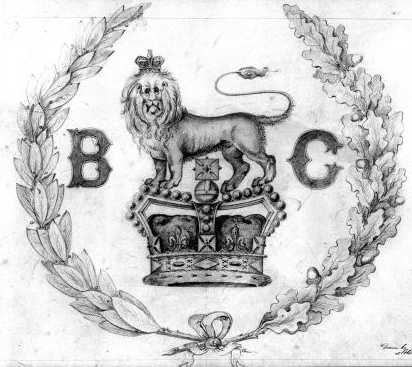
Moody designed the first Coat of arms of British Columbia

=== Foundation of New Westminster ===
In British Columbia, Moody 'wanted to build a city of beauty in the wilderness' and planned his city as an iconic visual metaphor for British dominance, 'styled and located with the objective of reinforcing the authority of the Crown and of the robe'. His choice for the name of the new capital city was 'Queensborough', but the British Government instead chose the name 'New Westminster' in July 1859. He founded New Westminster at a site of dense forest of Douglas pine that he selected for its strategic excellence, including the quality of its port. He, in his letter to his friend Arthur Blackwood of the Colonial Office, dated 1 February 1859, described the majestic beauty of the site:

The entrance to the Frazer is very striking—Extending miles to the right & left are low marsh lands (apparently of very rich qualities) & yet fr the Background of Superb Mountains- Swiss in outline, dark in woods, grandly towering into the clouds there is a sublimity that deeply impresses you. Everything is large and magnificent, worthy of the entrance to the Queen of England's dominions on the Pacific mainland. [...] My imagination converted the silent marshes into Cuyp-like pictures of horses and cattle lazily fattening in rich meadows in a glowing sunset. [...] The water of the deep clear Frazer was of a glassy stillness, not a ripple before us, except when a fish rose to the surface or broods of wild ducks fluttered away.

Moody planned the settlements of New Westminster: and his Royal Engineers, under Captain John Marshall Grant, built an extensive amount of infrastructure, including the road which became Kingsway, to connect New Westminster to False Creek; the North Road, between Port Moody and New Westminster; the Pacific terminus, at Burrard's Inlet, of the Canadian and Pacific Railway (which was subsequently extended to the mouth of the Inlet and now terminates at Vancouver); and the Cariboo Road; and Stanley Park, which were invaluable premises to defend against any invasion by the United States. He named Burnaby Lake after his secretary Robert Burnaby, and he named Port Coquitlam's 400-foot 'Mary Hill' after his wife Mary Susannah Hawks. He designed the first Coat of Arms of British Columbia. Moody designed the first Coat of arms of British Columbia. He established Port Moody, which was subsequently named after him, to defend New Westminster from any attack from the United States. Moody also established a town at Hastings which was later incorporated into Vancouver.

Subsequent to the enactment of the Pre-Emption Act of 1860, Moody settled the Lower Mainland, much of which the British government designated as protected government reserve. The Act did not specify conditions for the distribution of the protected government reserve, and, consequently, many of them were bought by speculators. Moody bought 3750 acres (sc. 1517 hectares) for himself, and there built, and owned, Mayfield, a model-farm near New Westminster. Moody was criticised by journalists for land grabbing, but his requisitions were ordered by the Colonial Office, and throughout his tenure in British Columbia he received the approbation of the British authorities, and was in British Columbia described as 'the real father of New Westminster'. However, Lord Lytton, then Secretary of State for the Colonies, 'forgot the practicalities of paying for clearing and developing the site and the town' and Moody's attempts to build infrastructure were continually impeded by insufficient funds: which, together with the continuous jealous opposition of Governor Douglas (whom Sir Thomas Frederick Elliot (1808–1880) described as 'like any other fraud') 'made it impossible for [Moody's] design to be fulfilled'.

Moody's fifth, sixth, and seventh children, all daughters, were born at Government House, New Westminster. He is also believed to have fathered at least two illegitimate children with his Native American housekeeper. He was also associated with the 16-year-old Hawaiian actress Lulu Sweet (b. c. 1844), from Victoria, with whom he toured the Fraser River, and after whom he named Lulu Island to the south of Vancouver.

=== Feud with Governor Douglas ===
Throughout his tenure in British Columbia, Moody feuded with Sir James Douglas Governor of Vancouver Island, whose jurisdiction overlapped with his own. Moody's offices of chief commissioner and lieutenant governor were of "higher prestige [and] lesser authority" than the office of Douglas despite Moody's superior social position in the judgement of the settlers. Lord Lytton had selected Moody to "out manoeuvre the old Hudson's Bay Factor [Governor Douglas]". Sir Thomas Frederick Elliot (1808–1880) described Governor Douglas as "like any other fraud", whereas Moody had been selected by Lord Lytton for his qualities of the archetypal 'English gentleman and British Officer', and because his family was 'eminently respectable': he was the son of Colonel Thomas Moody, CRE WI, ADC, Kt. and of Martha Clement (1784–1868) who was a socially superior member of the planter class of the West Indies, including Demerara and The Guianas, in which Douglas's father and brothers owned less land and from which Douglas's 'a half-breed' mother originated. Governor Douglas's ethnicity was 'an affront to Victorian society'.

Mary Susannah Moody, who was a member of the Hawks industrialist dynasty and of the armigerous Boyd merchant banking family, wrote, on 4 August 1859, "it is not pleasant to serve under a Hudson's Bay Factor", and that the "Governor and Richard can never get on". John Robson, who was the editor of the British Columbian and future Premier of British Columbia, wanted Moody's office to include that of Governor of British Columbia, to make Douglas obsolete. In letter to the Colonial Office of 27 December 1858, Moody stated that he had "entirely disarmed [Douglas] of all jealousy". Douglas repeatedly insulted the Royal Engineers by attempting to assume their command and refusing to acknowledge their contribution to the nascent colony.

Margaret A. Ormsby, the author of the Dictionary of Canadian Biography entry for Moody (2002), unsupportedly censures Moody for the abortive development of New Westminster. Most historians commend Moody's contribution and exonerate Moody from responsibility the abortive development of New Westminster, because of Governor Douglas's jealous indifference to the development of the mainland colony, in preference for the increase of the power of his Hudson's Bay Company associates in Victoria. Robert Burnaby observed that Douglas proceeded with "muddling [Moody's] work and doubling his expenditure" and with employing administrators to "work a crooked policy against Moody" to "retard British Columbia and build up... the stronghold of Hudson's Bay interests" and their own "landed stake". Therefore, Robert Edgar Cail, Don W. Thomson, Laura Ishiguro, and Laura Elaine Scott commended Moody for his contribution, and Scott accused Ormsby of being "adamant in her dislike of Colonel Moody" despite the majority of the evidence, and almost all other biographies of Moody, including that by the Institution of Civil Engineers, and that by the Royal Engineers, and that by the British Columbia Historical Association, commend Moody's achievements in British Columbia.

The Royal Engineers, Columbia Detachment was disbanded in July 1863. The Moody family (which now consisted of Moody, and his wife, and seven legitimate children) and the 22 Royal Engineers who wished to return to England, who included 15 non-officers and had 8 wives between them, departed on 11 November 1863 on the steamer Enterprise. 130 of the original Columbia Detachment remained in British Columbia. Scott contends that the dissolution of the elite Columbia Detachment, and the consequent departure of Moody, "doomed" the development of the settlement and the realisation of Lord Lytton's dream. A vast congregation of New Westminster citizens gathered at the dock to bid farewell to Moody as his boat departed for England. Moody left his personal library behind, in New Westminster, to become the public library of New Westminster. Moody wanted to return to British Columbia, but he died before he was able to do so.

In April 1863, the Councillors of New Westminster decreed that 20 acres should be reserved and named Moody Square after Moody. The area around Moody Square that was completed only in 1889 also has been named Moody Park after Moody. Numerous developments occurred in and around Moody Park, including Century House, which was opened by Princess Margaret on 23 July 1958. In 1984, on the occasion of the 125th anniversary of New Westminster, a monument of Moody, at the entrance of the park, was unveiled by Mayor Tom Baker. For Moody's achievements in the Falkland Islands and in British Columbia, British diplomat David Tatham CMG, who served as Governor of the Falkland Islands, described Moody as an "Empire builder". In January 2014, with the support of the Friends of the British Columbia Archives and of the Royal British Columbia Museum Foundation, The Royal British Columbia Museum purchased a photograph album that had belonged to Moody. The album contains over 100 photographs of the early settlement of British Columbia, including some of the earliest known photographs of First Nations peoples.

His mother Martha was living at Bycroft Terrace, St. David, Exeter, during 1851, and died at Bournemouth on the 30 March 1868.

== Marriage and issue ==
On 6 July 1852, at St Andrew's Church, Newcastle upon Tyne, Moody married Mary Susannah Hawks (22 April 1829 – 12 January 1901) of the Hawks industrialist dynasty, who was the daughter of Joseph Stanley Hawks JP DL, Sheriff of Newcastle, and of Mary Boyd of the armigerous Boyd merchant banking family which had founded the Bank of Newcastle. Mary Susannah Hawks's maternal uncles included Admiral Benedictus Marwood Kelly; industrialist Edward Fenwick Boyd; and The Ven. William Boyd (1809–1893), of University College, Oxford, who was Archdeacon of Craven and Honorary Canon of Ripon from 1860, through whom her first cousin was The Ven. Charles Twining Boyd, Archdeacon of Columbo.

Mary Susannah Hawks was a descendant on several lines of Edward III, and a descendant of Sir Thomas Liddell, 1st Baronet, Sir William Chaytor of Croft, and of Sir Hamon de Clervaulx [sic], after whom she named her son Henry de Clervaux Moody (1864–1900). After their marriage, Moody and his wife Mary embarked on a grand tour of Europe, including France, Switzerland, and Germany.

Moody named the 400-foot hill in Port Coquitlam, British Columbia, 'Mary Hill', after his wife, who described living in British Columbia as 'roughing it in the bush' relative to living in England. The Royal British Columbia Museum has 42 letters written by Mary Susannah Moody from the British Empire, mostly from the Colony of British Columbia (1858–66), to her mother and to her sisters, Juliana Stanley Hawks (d. 1868) and Emily Stanley Hawks (d. 1865), who were in England. Mary Susannah Moody was erudite in English and in French literature and the letters have been of interest to scholars of the ruling class of the British Empire.

Mary Susannah Moody, who after her husband's death lived at The Chantry, Foy, Herefordshire, died at Woodfield, Weston-under-Penyard, on 12 January 1901, when she was aged 72 years.

=== Issue ===
Moody and Mary Susannah Hawks had 13 children, the youngest two of whom died in infancy. He also is believed to have fathered at least two illegitimate children with his Native American housekeeper whom he left with her in British Columbia. The 13 children of Moody and Mary Susannah Hawks were:

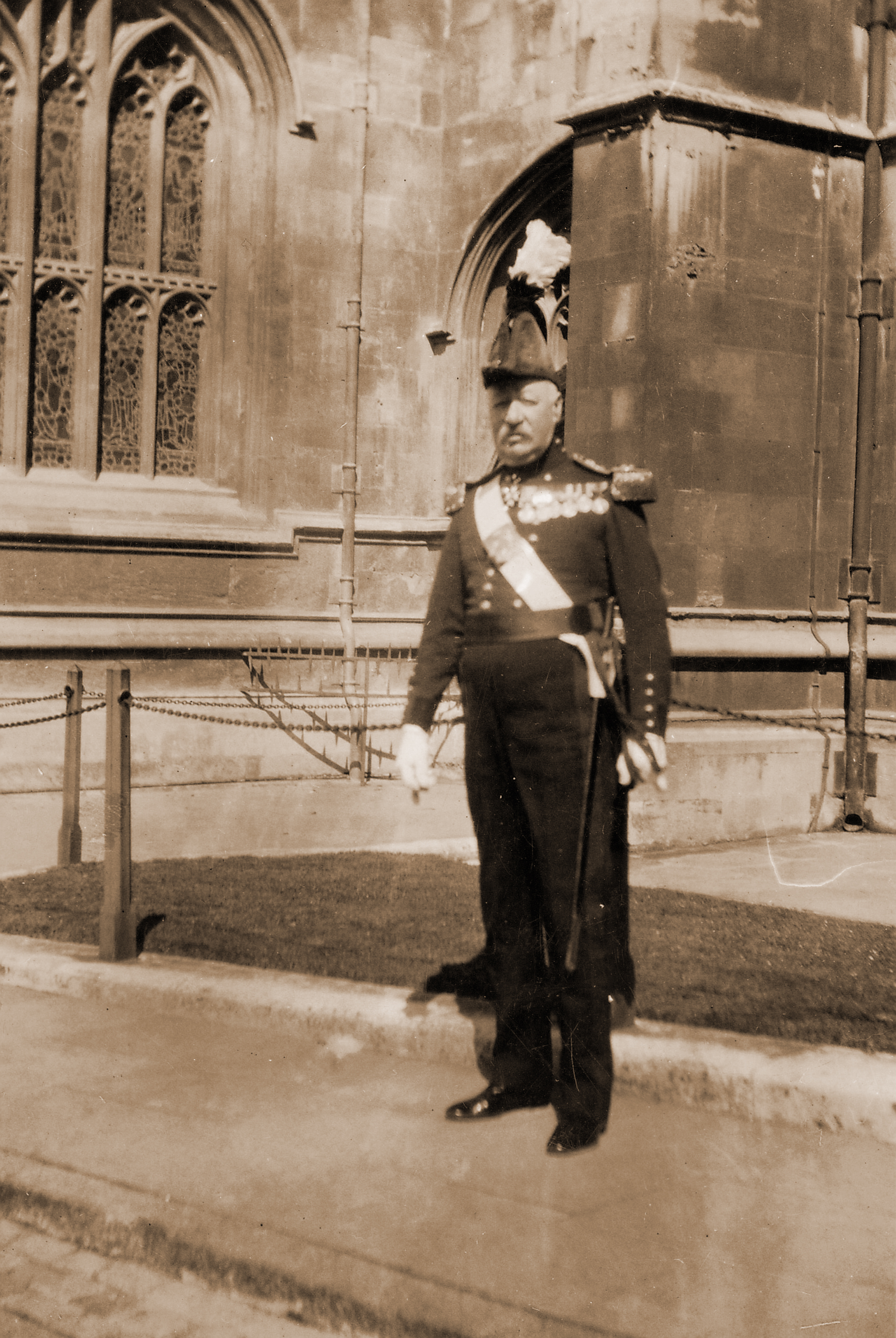
Richard Clement Moody and Mary Susannah Hawks's eldest son, Colonel Richard Stanley Hawks Moody CB, at Windsor Castle

1. Josephine ('Zeffie') Mary (b. 1853, Newcastle, d. 1923). A fabric embroiderer of Fisherton House, Fisherton de la Mere, Wiltshire. She married Arthur Newall, who was the eldest son of Robert Stirling Newall FRS FRAS, at St James's Church, Piccadilly, on 20 July 1883, by whom she had two sons. Their eldest son Robert Stanley FSA (1884–1987) of Little Cottage Street, Westminster, was an ethnographer of Aboriginal Australia and an archaeologist for the Commissioners of Woods and Forests who made excavations at Stonehenge with Lieutenant-Colonel William Hawley between 1919 and 1926, and was Vice President of Salisbury Museum from 1971. Her second son was named Basil (b. 1885).
2. Colonel Richard Stanley Hawks Moody CB, Military Knight of Windsor (b. 23 October 1854, Valletta, Malta – d. 10 March 1930, Windsor Castle). He married, in 1881, Mary Latimer, Royal Red Cross, (d. 1936). Mary Latimer's paternal grandmother was Anne Moody who was the first cousin of Richard Clement Moody. Mary Latimer's uncle was Nichol Latimer, who was the publisher of The North China Herald which was the most influential newspaper in China. The eldest daughter of Richard Stanley Hawks Moody and Mary Latimer was Mary Latimer ('Molly') Moody, who married Major-General James Fitzgerald Martin KStJ.
3. Charles Edmund (b. 1856, Edinburgh). He was educated at Cheltenham College, and was a flannel manufacturer. He later lived at Springfield, Breinton, Herefordshire. He married Kate Ellershaw, who was the daughter of Frederick Ellershaw, in 1885, by whom he had three daughters, the eldest of whom, Kathleen (b. 1886), married Sir Donald Kingdon, Chief Justice of the Gold Coast.
4. Walter Clement (b. 1858, Edinburgh, d. 25 December 1933, Cheltenham). He played rugby for Northumberland before he emigrated to California in which he owned vineyards. He later lived at Ross-on-Wye, Herefordshire, and at Broxted House, Cheltenham. He married Laura Evelyn Rynd (d. 1934), who was the sister of Captain G. C. Rynd, of the Manchester Regiment, in 1888. His wife left an estate of £12,643 (about £643,000 in 21st-century money).
5. Susan (b. 1860, Government House, New Westminster, British Columbia, d. 1940).
6. Mary (b. 1861, Government House, New Westminster, British Columbia, d. 1938).
7. Margaret JP (b. 14 January 1863, Government House, New Westminster, British Columbia, d. 16 December 1943, Pershore, Worcestershire). She was a Pershore District Councillor. She married The Rev. William Dobson Lowndes, of Christ's College, Cambridge, of Little Comberton Rectory, Pershore, in 1884, with whom she had two sons and two daughters. Their youngest daughter was Mary de Clervaux, who married Alan Edgar Lester, of Birmingham and Harborne, and who drowned in 1950; and their elder daughter was Margaret Alice, who was a missionary at Zanzibar with the Universities' Mission to South Africa. Their younger son was The Rev. William Parker Lowndes, of St. Pancras Church, Ipswich, of the Royal Artillery, who died during 1929 after a fall from his horse exacerbated wounds that he had received in World War I. Their elder son was the Royal Arch freemason Major Richard Charles Lowndes MC (1888–1960), of the Royal Artillery, who was captured and imprisoned by the Turkish after the Siege of Kut in World War I. He is buried, with his mother and wife and son, at St. Peter's, Little Comberton, Worcestershire.
8. Captain Henry de Clervaux (b. 8 February 1864, Bournemouth, d. 13 December 1900, killed in action at Battle of Nooitgedacht, Second Boer War). He was named after his ancestor Sir Hamon de Clervaulx [sic] who had accompanied William the Conqueror from Normandy to the Battle of Hastings in 1066. Henry de Clervaux was educated at Rugby School and at Royal Military Academy, Sandhurst, after which he joined the Queen's Royal West Surrey Regiment in 1883. He served, between 1885 and 1887, in the Burmese Expedition with the 2nd Battalion the Queen's Own Royal West Kent Regiment, under Sir W. S. A. Lockhart, for which he received the medal with clasp. He joined the South Wales Borderers/2nd Battalion 24th Regiment in 1894. He served in the Second Boer War as aide-de-camp to Major-General Clements, who was the Commander of the 12th Infantry Brigade from December 1899, and he was mentioned in despatches on 10 September 1900. He married, on 15 January 1895, Flora Leighton, who was the daughter of Edmund Thomas Leighton, of London, by whom he did not have issue. He was greatly interested in sport and riding. He is buried at Krugersdorp Garden of Remembrance, in South Africa, and commemorated at Hereford Cathedral, and at St Mary's Church, Foy, Herefordshire, and at Brecon Cathedral, Powys, Wales, and at Holy Trinity Church, Guildford, Surrey, and at Rugby School Chapel Memorial, Warwickshire.
9. Grace (b. 1865, d. 1947).
10. Gertrude (b. 20 May 1867, d. 23 April 1913, Cadenabbia, Switzerland). She resided at Horkesley House, Monkland, Herefordshire. She died unmarried and is buried and commemorated with her nephew Thomas Lewis Vyvian Moody (d. 1918) and his father Richard Stanley Hawks Moody (d. 1930) at All Saints' Churchyard in Monkland, Herefordshire.
11. Major George Robert Boyd (b. 1868, d. 1936). He was educated at Haileybury and Imperial Service College, and at Royal Military Academy, Sandhurst, and was commissioned into the King's Shropshire Light Infantry. He during 1918 was found guilty of indecent assault of two drivers of the Army Service Corps, and was cashiered by court-martial on 3 April 1918. He lived at Batchcroft, Richard's Castle, near Ludlow. He married, on 27 August 1902, Dorothy Whinfield, who was the youngest daughter of Lieutenant-Colonel Charles William Whinfield (1840–1893), Royal Engineers, of Wyeville, Bridstow, Ross, and sister of Lieutenant H. C. Whinfield of the Queen’s Foot. Their only daughter Rosemary Moody (1903–1982) married Richard Edward Holford (1909–1983), of Duntish Court, Dorset, who was the eldest son of Captain Charles Frederick Holford OBE DSO, on 10 August 1935, at All Saints' Parish Church, Richard's Castle, near Ludlow.
12. Ruth and Rachel (Twins b. 20 April 1870, Rachel d. 20 April 1870, Ruth d. 21 April 1870, both at Caynham House, Ludlow, Shropshire).

== Ancestry ==
Ancestors of Richard Clement Moody

16. Thomas Moody (b. 1650, Moss, Campsall) (son of Henry Moody (fl. 1673) and his wife Hannah Washington)
8. Thomas Moody (1694, Alloway – 1732)
17. Elizabeth (surname unknown)
4. Thomas Moody (1732, Arthuret – 1796) (who had fought for the Jacobites at the Battle of Culloden when he was aged only 13 years)
9. Janet Agnes Smith (married 1723, Dalrymple, as his second wife)
2. Colonel Thomas Moody ADC, CRE WI, Kt. (uncle of Clement Moody (clergyman))
10. John Blamire
5. Barbara Blamire (1740–1806)
1. Major-General Richard Clement Moody Kt. (married Mary Susannah Hawks, at Newcastle upon Tyne, 1852)
6. Richard Clement (1754–1829)
3. Martha Clement (1784–1868) (sister-in-law of Philippa Cobham Alleyne and aunt of Richard Clement (cricketer) and Reynold Clement)
14. Thomas Dougan of Demerara
7. Susannah Dougan (first wife of Richard Clement)

== Sources ==
- "The Photographic Album of Richard Clement Moody, Royal British Columbia Museum Archives" (PDF).
- Mary Susannah Moody letters, MS-0060, The Royal British Columbia Museum Archives
- Minutes of the Proceedings of the Institution of Civil Engineers, Volume 90, Issue 1887, 1887, pp. 453–455, OBITUARY. MAJOR-GENERAL RICHARD CLEMENT MOODY, R.E., 1813–1887.
- Tatham, David. "Entry for Moody, Richard Clement". Dictionary of Falklands Biography.
- Sweetman, John. "Entry for Moody, Richard Clement". Oxford Dictionary of National Biography (online ed.). Oxford University Press. doi:10.1093/ref:odnb/19085. (Subscription, Wikipedia Library access or UK public library membership required.)
- Vetch, Robert Hamilton (1894). "Entry for Moody, Richard Clement" . Dictionary of National Biography. Vol. 38. p. 332-333.
- Cleall, Esme; Ishiguro, Laura; Manktelow, Emily J. (Spring 2013). "Imperial Relations: Histories of Family in the British Empire". Journal of Colonialism and Colonial History. 14 (1). doi:10.1353/cch.2013.0006. S2CID 162030654.
- Scott, Laura Elaine (1983). The Imposition of British Culture as Portrayed in the New Westminster Capital Plan of 1859 to 1862 (PDF) (M. A. Thesis). Simon Fraser University.
- Daniel Francis, ed. (1999). Encyclopedia of British Columbia. Harbour Publishing. ISBN 1-55017-200-X.
- Derek Hayes (2005). Historical Atlas of Vancouver and the Lower Fraser Valley. Douglas & McIntyre. pp. 26–29. ISBN 978-1-55365-283-0.
- Arthur S. Morton (1973) [1939]. A History of the Canadian West to 1870-71, Second Edition. University of Toronto Press. p. 775f. ISBN 0-8020-0253-6.
- Moody, Richard Clement (January–April 1951). Willard E. Ireland (ed.). "Letter of Colonel Richard Clement Moody, R.E., to Arthur Blackwood, February 1, 1859". British Columbia Historical Quarterly. XV (1 & 2): 85–107.
- Ormsby, Margaret A. (1982). "Entry for Moody, Richard Clement". In Halpenny, Francess G. (ed.). Dictionary of Canadian Biography. Vol. XI (1881–1890) (online ed.). University of Toronto Press.

Government offices
| Preceded by None (R. C. Moody Inaugural Holder) | Governor of the Falkland Islands (renamed from 'Lieutenant-Governor' in June 1843) and Commander-in-Chief of the Falkland Islands; 01 October 1841 – July 1848 | Succeeded by George Rennie |
| Preceded by None (R. C. Moody Inaugural Holder) | Lieutenant-Governor of British Columbia and Chief Commissioner of Lands and Works for British Columbia; 25 December 1858 – July 1863 | Succeeded by Frederick Seymour |
