= Colony of British Columbia (1858–1866) =

British crown colony in North America

- 1858–1866
- Flag
- Anthem: God Save the Queen
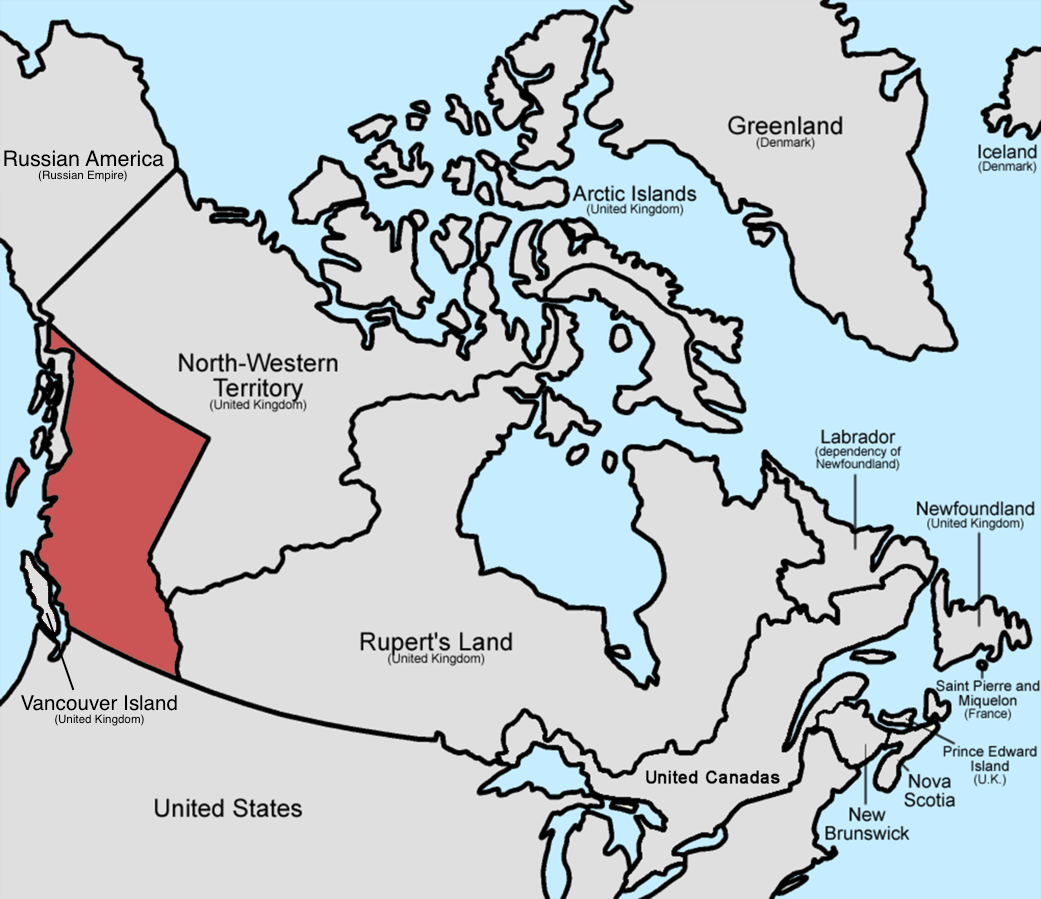
- The Colony of British Columbia in 1863
- Status: British colony
- Capital: Fort Langley (1858–1859); New Westminster (1859–1866)
- Common languages: English (official); Northern Athabaskan languages; Salishan languages
- Religion: Christianity, Indigenous beliefs
- Government: Constitutional monarchy
- Queen
  - 1858-1866: Queen Victoria
- Historical era: British Era
  - Established: 2 August 1858
  - Incorporated with Colony of Vancouver Island to form Colony of British Columbia (1866-1871): 6 August 1866
- Currency: Pound sterling (to 1865); British Columbia dollar (1865–1866)
Preceded by
New Caledonia (Canada)
North-Western Territory
Colony of the Queen Charlotte Islands
Stickeen Territories
Russian America
Succeeded by
Colony of British Columbia (1866–1871)

The Colony of British Columbia was a crown colony in British North America from 1858 until 1866 that was founded by Richard Clement Moody, who was selected to 'found a second England on the shores of the Pacific'. Moody was Chief Commissioner of Lands and Works for British Columbia and the first Lieutenant-Governor of British Columbia.

Prior to Moody's arrival, the colony's highest authority was James Douglas, governor of the neighbouring colony of Vancouver Island.

British Columbia Boundaries Act 1863
- Act of Parliament
- Parliament of the United Kingdom
- Long title: An Act to define the Boundaries of the Colony of British Columbia, and to continue an Act to provide for the Government of the said Colony.
- Citation: 26 & 27 Vict. c. 83
- Territorial extent: United Kingdom

Dates
- Royal assent: 28 July 1863
- Commencement: 28 July 1863 (Note: The Acts of Parliament (Commencement) Act 1793.)
- Repealed: 6 August 1866
Other legislation
Amends	British Columbia Government Act 1858
Repealed by	British Columbia Act 1866

Status: Repealed

Text of statute as originally enacted

This first colony of British Columbia did not originally include the Colony of Vancouver Island, or the regions north of the Nass and Finlay rivers or east of the Rocky Mountains, or any of the coastal islands, but it did include the Colony of the Queen Charlotte Islands, and was enlarged in 1863 in the north and northeast up to the 60th parallel and the 120th meridian by the British Columbia Boundaries Act 1863 (26 & 27 Vict. c. 83). In 1866, the colony was effectively merged with the Colony of Vancouver Island to create the new Colony of British Columbia (1866–1871).

== Background ==
The explorations of James Cook and George Vancouver, and the concessions of Spain in 1794 established British claims over the coastal area north of California. Similar claims were established inland via the explorations of John Finlay, Sir Alexander Mackenzie, Simon Fraser, Samuel Black, and David Thompson, and by the subsequent establishment of fur trading posts by the North West Company and the Hudson's Bay Company (HBC). However, until 1858 the region which now constitutes the mainland of the Province of British Columbia was an unorganised area of British North America comprising two fur trading districts: New Caledonia, north of the Thompson River drainage; and the Columbia District, located south of the Thompson and throughout the basin of the Columbia River.

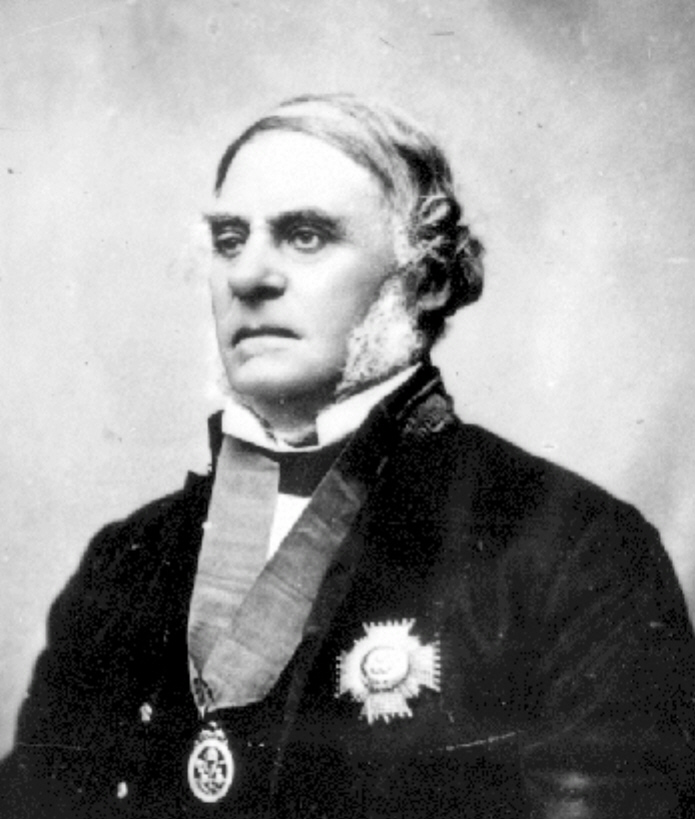
Sir James Douglas, first governor of the Colony of British Columbia

With the signing of the Treaty of Washington in 1846, which established the U.S. border along the 49th parallel, the HBC moved the headquarters of its western operations from Fort Vancouver on the Columbia River (present day Vancouver, Washington) to the newly established Fort Victoria, on the southern tip of Vancouver Island. Vancouver Island and the surrounding Gulf Islands in the Strait of Georgia were organized as a crown colony in 1849. Meanwhile, the mainland continued to function under the de facto administration of the HBC, whose chief executive, James Douglas, was also governor of Vancouver Island. The non-Indigenous mainland population during this time never exceeded about 150 at Fort Victoria, mostly HBC employees and their families.

== Governorship of James Douglas ==
By 1857, Americans and British were beginning to respond to rumors of gold in the Thompson River area. Almost overnight, some ten to twenty thousand men moved into the region around present-day Yale, British Columbia, sparking the Fraser Canyon Gold Rush. Governor Douglas - who had no legal authority over New Caledonia – stationed a gunboat at the entrance of the Fraser River to exert such authority by collecting licences from prospectors attempting to make their way upstream. To normalize its jurisdiction, and undercut any HBC claims to the resource wealth of the mainland, the district was converted to a Crown colony on 2 August 1858 by the Parliament of the United Kingdom, and given the name British Columbia. Douglas was offered the governorship of the new colony by the British colonial secretary, Sir Edward Bulwer-Lytton, provided that he sever his employment with the Hudson's Bay Company, which Douglas agreed to do, and received a knighthood.

Immigration into the new colony obliged Douglas to act quickly to define regulations and create infrastructure. Magistrates and constables were hired, mining regulations drawn up, and town sites surveyed at Yale, Hope and Fort Langley to discourage squatting on crown land. In addition, roads were constructed into the areas of greatest mining exploration around Lillooet and Lytton. The colony, however, was not immediately granted a representative colonial assembly because of uncertainty as to whether the gold rush would yield a stable, settled population. Douglas, who had conflicted with the assembly on Vancouver Island, was relieved.

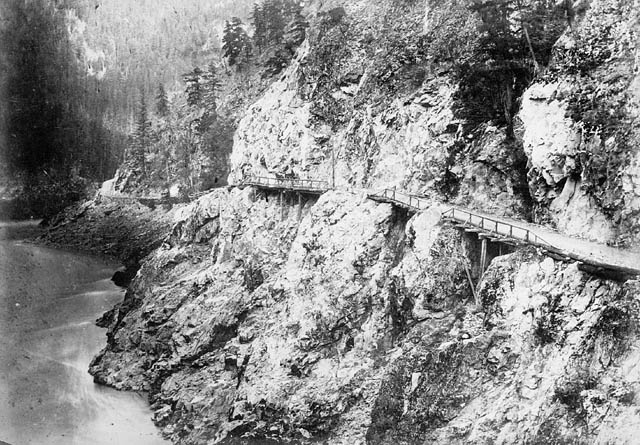
A portion of the Cariboo Road in the Fraser Canyon, c. 1867

The rush indeed was short lived, and the exodus of miners, speculators, and merchants was already underway by the time the Royal Engineers had laid out the colony's new capital at New Westminster. Prospecting continued, however, and additional finds farther inland in the Cariboo region in 1860 signalled an impending second gold rush. Provisioning was already proving to be an acute problem, and with more distant finds it became clear that wagon trains would have to replace pack horses, necessitating new infrastructure.

Douglas negotiated several treaties with the natives present on Vancouver Island on behalf of the Crown, establishing reserves. These treaties continue to this day. The vast majority of First Nations traditional territory was absorbed into the new colony of British Columbia, without treaty.

== Foundation by Richard Clement Moody ==
=== Selection ===
When news of the Fraser Canyon Gold Rush reached London, Sir Edward Bulwer-Lytton, Secretary of State for the Colonies, requested that the War Office recommend a field officer who was "a man of good judgment possessing a knowledge of mankind" to lead a corps of 150 (later increased to 172) Royal Engineers who had been selected for their "superior discipline and intelligence". The War Office chose Moody. Lord Lytton, who described Moody as his "distinguished friend", accepted their nomination as a consequence of Moody's military record, his success as Governor of the Falkland Islands, and the distinguished record of his father, Colonel Thomas Moody, at the Colonial Office. Moody was charged to establish British order and to transform the new Colony of British Columbia into the British Empire's "bulwark in the farthest west" and "found a second England on the shores of the Pacific". Lytton desired to send to the colony "representatives of the best of British culture, not just a police force", men who possessed "courtesy, high breeding and urbane knowledge of the world" such as Moody, whom the government considered to be the archetypal "English gentleman and British Officer" to command the Royal Engineers, Columbia Detachment. Moody's brother, Colonel Hampden Clement Blamire Moody, had already served with the Royal Engineers in British North America (mainly at Fort Garry), from 1840 to 1848, to such success that he was subsequently granted command of the regiment across the entirety of China.

Richard Clement Moody, his wife Mary, and their four children left England for British Columbia in October 1858 and arrived in December with the 172 Royal Engineers of the Royal Engineers, Columbia Detachment, and Moody's secretary, the freemason Robert Burnaby (after whom he subsequently named Burnaby Lake). The original Columbia Detachment consisted of 150 Royal Engineers, both sappers and officers, before it was increased to 172. The 'gentlemen' Royal Engineers defined by Moody were his three captains (Robert Mann Parsons, John Marshall Grant, and Henry Reynolds Luard) and his two lieutenants (Arthur Reid Lempriere and Henry Spencer Palmer), in addition to Captain William Driscoll Gosset (who was to be Colonial Treasurer and Commissary Officer). The contingent also included Doctor John Vernon Seddall and John Sheepshanks (who was to be Chaplain of the Columbia Detachment). Moody was sworn in as the first lieutenant-governor of British Columbia and appointed Chief Commissioner of Lands and Works for British Columbia.

=== Ned McGowan's War ===
Moody had hoped to begin immediately the foundation of a capital city, but on his arrival at Fort Langley, he learned of an insurrection at the settlement of Hill's Bar by a notorious outlaw, Ned McGowan, and some restive gold miners. Moody repressed the rebellion, which became popularly known as 'Ned McGowan's War', without loss of life. Moody described the incident: The notorious Ned McGowan, of Californian celebrity at the head of a band of Yankee Rowdies defying the law! Every peaceable citizen frightened out of his wits!—Summons & warrants laughed to scorn! A Magistrate seized while on the Bench, & brought to the Rebel's camp, tried, condemned, & heavily fined! A man shot dead shortly before! Such a tale to welcome me at the close of a day of great enjoyment. Moody described the response to his success: 'They gave me a Salute, firing off their loaded Revolvers over my head—Pleasant—Balls whistling over one's head! as a compliment! Suppose a hand had dropped by accident! I stood up, & raised my cap & thanked them in the Queen's name for their loyal reception of me'.

=== The founding of British Columbia ===
In British Columbia, Moody 'wanted to build a city of beauty in the wilderness' and planned his city as an iconic visual metaphor for British dominance, 'styled and located with the objective of reinforcing the authority of the Crown and of the robe'. Subsequent to the enactment of the Pre-emption Act of 1860, Moody settled the Lower Mainland. He founded the new capital city, New Westminster, at a site of dense forest of Douglas pine that he selected for its strategic excellence including the quality of its port. In a letter to his friend Arthur Blackwood of the Colonial Office on 1 February 1859 Moody described the majestic beauty of the site:

The entrance to the Frazer is very striking--Extending miles to the right & left are low marsh lands (apparently of very rich qualities) & yet fr the Background of Superb Mountains- Swiss in outline, dark in woods, grandly towering into the clouds there is a sublimity that deeply impresses you. Everything is large and magnificent, worthy of the entrance to the Queen of England's dominions on the Pacific mainland. [...] My imagination converted the silent marshes into Cuyp-like pictures of horses and cattle lazily fattening in rich meadows in a glowing sunset. [...] The water of the deep clear Frazer was of a glassy stillness, not a ripple before us, except when a fish rose to the surface or broods of wild ducks fluttered away".

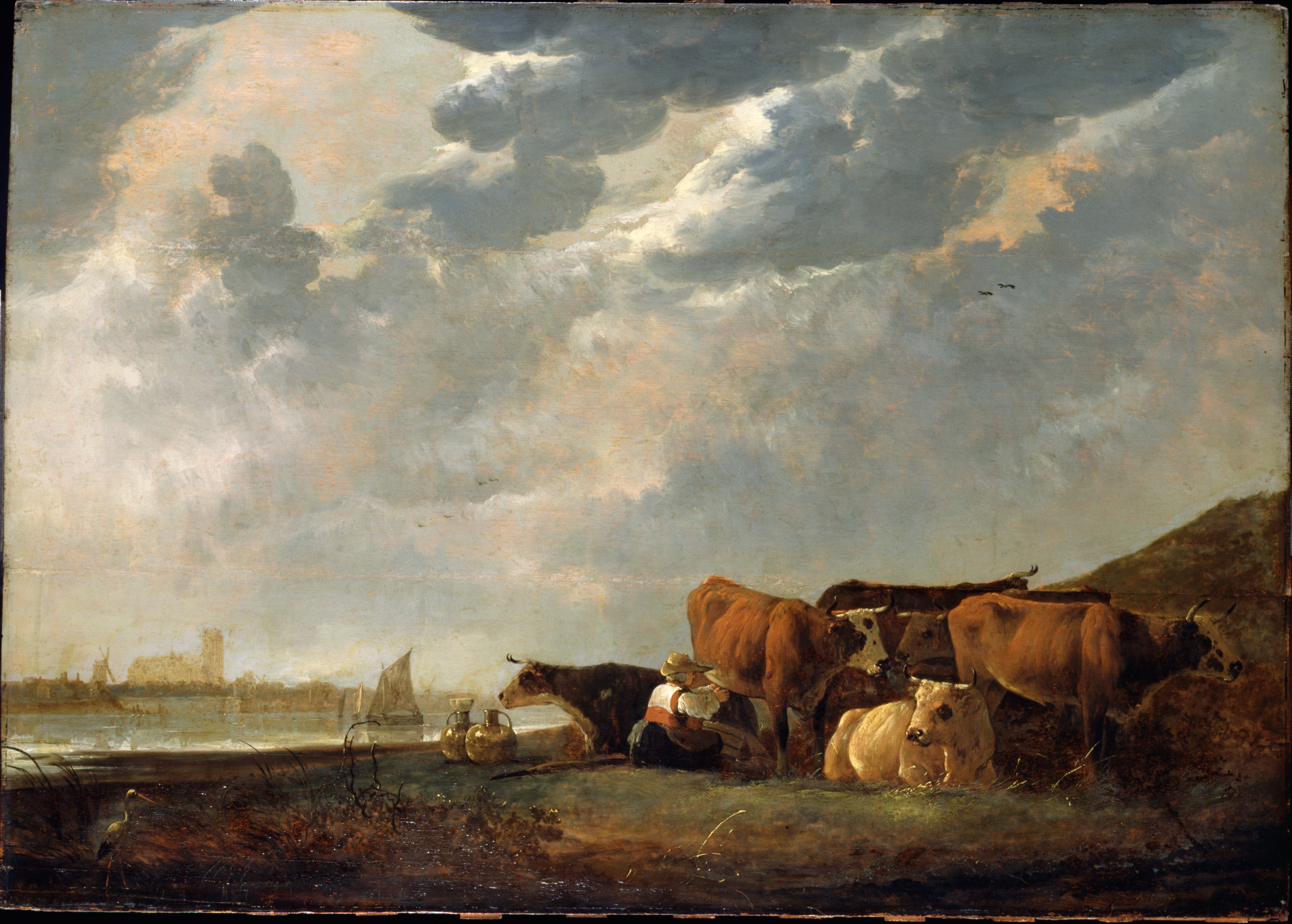
Moody likened his vision of the nascent Colony of British Columbia to the pastoral scenes painted by Aelbert Cuyp

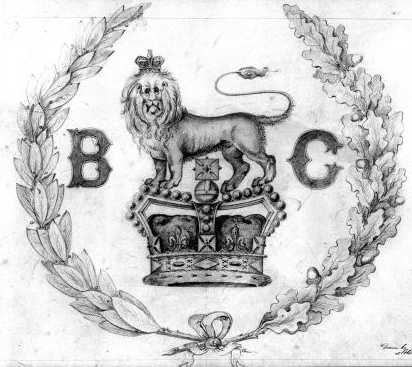
Moody designed the first coat of arms of British Columbia

Moody designed the roads and the settlements of New Westminster, and his Royal Engineers, under Captain John Marshall Grant, built an extensive road network, including that which became Kingsway, which connected New Westminster to False Creek; the North Road between Port Moody and New Westminster; and the Pacific terminus, at Burrard's Inlet, of Port Moody, of the Canadian and Pacific Railway (which subsequently was extended to the mouth of the Inlet and terminates now at Vancouver); and the Cariboo Road; and Stanley Park, which was an important strategic area for the anticipated invasion by the United States. He named Burnaby Lake after his secretary, Robert Burnaby, and named Port Coquitlam's 400-foot (120 m) 'Mary Hill' after his wife Mary Susannah Hawks. Moody designed the first coat of arms of British Columbia. He established Port Moody, which was subsequently named after him, at the end of the trail that connected New Westminster with Burrard Inlet, to defend New Westminster from potential attack from the United States. Moody also established a town at Hastings which was later incorporated into Vancouver.

The British designated multiple tracts as government reserves. The Pre-emption Act did not specify conditions for the distribution of the land, and, consequently, large areas were bought by speculators. Moody requisitioned 3,750 acres (sc. 1,517 hectares) for himself, and on this land subsequently built for himself Mayfield, a model farm near New Westminster. Moody was criticised by journalists for land grabbing, but his requisitions were ordered by the Colonial Office, and throughout his tenure in British Columbia he received the approbation of the British authorities in London, and was in British Columbia described as 'the real father of New Westminster'. However, Lord Lytton, then Secretary of State for the Colonies, 'forgot the practicalities of paying for clearing and developing the site and the town' and the effort of Moody's Engineers was continually impeded by insufficient funds, which, together with the continuous opposition of Governor Douglas, whom Sir Thomas Frederick Elliot (1808 - 1880) described as 'like any other fraud', 'made it impossible for [Moody's] design to be fulfilled'.

Throughout his tenure in British Columbia, Moody feuded with Sir James Douglas, Governor of Vancouver Island, whose jurisdiction overlapped with his own. Moody's offices of Chief Commissioner and Lieutenant-Governor were of 'higher prestige [and] lesser authority' than that of Douglas, despite Moody's superior social position in the judgment of the Royal Engineers and of the British Government which had selected Moody to 'out manoeuvre the old Hudson's Bay Factor [Governor Douglas]'. Moody had been selected by Lord Lytton for his qualities of the archetypal 'English gentleman and British Officer', and because his family was 'eminently respectable'. He was the son of Colonel Thomas Moody and of Martha Clement, who was a socially superior member of the planter class of the West Indies, including Demerara and The Guianas, in which Douglas's father and the same's brothers owned less land and from which Douglas's 'a half-breed' mother originated. Governor Douglas's ethnicity was 'an affront to Victorian society'.

Mary Moody, who was a member of the Hawks industrialist dynasty and of the armigerous Boyd merchant banking family, wrote, on 4 August 1859, 'it is not pleasant to serve under a Hudson's Bay Factor', and that the 'Governor and Richard can never get on'. John Robson, who was the editor of the British Columbian and future Premier of British Columbia, wanted Richard Clement Moody's office to include that of Governor of British Columbia, and to make Douglas obsolete. In letter to the Colonial Office of 27 December 1858, Richard Clement Moody states that he has 'entirely disarmed [Douglas] of all jealously'. Douglas repeatedly insulted the Royal Engineers by attempting to assume their command and refusing to acknowledge their contribution to the nascent colony.

Margaret A. Ormsby, who was the author of the Dictionary of Canadian Biography entry for Moody (2002), unpopularly censures Moody for the abortive development of New Westminster. However, most significant historians commend Moody's contribution and exonerate Moody from culpability for the abortive development of New Westminster, especially with regard to the perpetual insufficiency of funds and of the personally motivated opposition by Douglas that continually retarded the development of British Columbia. Robert Burnaby observed that Douglas proceeded with 'muddling [Moody's] work and doubling his expenditure' and with employing administrators to 'work a crooked policy against Moody' to 'retard British Columbia and build up... the stronghold of Hudson's Bay interests' and their own 'landed stake'. Robert Edgar Cail, Don W. Thomson, Laura Ishiguro, and Laura Elaine Scott commended Moody for his contribution, and Scott accused Ormsby of being 'adamant in her dislike of Colonel Moody' despite the majority of evidence. Almost all other biographies of Moody, including those of the Institution of Civil Engineers, the Royal Engineers, and the British Columbia Historical Association commend Moody's achievements in British Columbia.

The Royal Engineers, Columbia Detachment was disbanded in July 1863. The Moody family (which now consisted of Moody, and his wife, and seven legitimate children) and the 22 Royal Engineers who wished to return to England, who had 8 wives between them, departed for England. 130 of the original Columbia Detachment decided to remain in British Columbia. Scott contends that the dissolution of the Columbia Detachment, and the consequent departure of Moody, 'doomed' the development of the settlement and the realisation of Lord Lytton's dream. A vast congregation of New Westminster citizens gathered at the dock to bid farewell to Moody as his boat departed for England. Moody wanted to return to British Columbia, but he died before he was able to do so. Moody left his library behind in New Westminster, to become the public library of New Westminster.

In April 1863, the Councillors of New Westminster decreed that 20 acres should be reserved and named Moody Square after Richard Clement Moody. The area around Moody Square that was completed only in 1889 has also been named Moody Park after Moody. Numerous developments occurred in and around Moody Park, including Century House, which was opened by Princess Margaret on 23 July 1958. In 1984, on the occasion of the 125th anniversary of New Westminster, a monument of Richard Clement Moody, at the entrance of the park, was unveiled by Mayor Tom Baker. For Moody's achievements in the Falkland Islands and in British Columbia, British diplomat David Tatham CMG, who served as Governor of the Falkland Islands, described Moody as an 'Empire builder'. In January 2014, with the support of the Friends of the British Columbia Archives and of the Royal British Columbia Museum Foundation, The Royal British Columbia Museum purchased a photograph album that had belonged to Richard Clement Moody. The album contains over 100 photographs of the early settlement of British Columbia, including some of the earliest known photographs of First Nations peoples.

== Governorship of Frederick Seymour ==
Douglas's successor was Frederick Seymour, who came to the colony with twenty years of colonial experience in Van Diemen's Land, the British West Indies, and British Honduras. The creation of an assembly and Seymour's appointment in April 1864 signalled a new era for the colony, now out of the shadow of Vancouver Island and free of a governor suspicious of sharing power with elected representatives. Douglas's wagon road project was still underway, presenting huge engineering challenges, as it made its way up the narrow Fraser Canyon. Successive loans authorised by Seymour's predecessor, largely for the purpose of completing the road, had put the colony £200,000 in debt; and the Chilcotin War of 1864 cost an additional £18,000 to suppress. Seymour himself made the difficult journey through the Great Canyon of the Homathko and Rainbow Range as a show of force and participation in the hunt for Klatsassin, the Tsilhqot'in war leader, but the armed expedition reached a denouement when Klatsassin surrendered on terms of amnesty in times of war, only to be tried and hanged for murder, as Seymour had not endorsed the terms.

On Seymour's return overland, he made a tour of the Cariboo minefields, and along the Fraser Canyon, which made him increasingly convinced of the colony's future prosperity. On returning to the capital, however, fiscal reality set in as it became clear that British Columbia's indebtedness was getting worse. Even as the colonial administration took drastic measures to augment revenues and improve the road system to attract prospectors and settlers, the economic situation grew increasingly dire, and agitation grew for an amalgamation of the two colonies. Seymour opposed this proposal, but with pressure from various quarters of the colonial government, he eventually relented, recommending that British Columbia be the dominant partner, and (unsuccessfully) that the capital be located at New Westminster. The two colonies were united by an Act of the British Parliament, and proclaimed on 6 August 1866 (see Colony of British Columbia (1866-1871)).

== Governors ==
- Sir James Douglas, 1858–1864
- Frederick Seymour, 1864–1866

=== Colonial Assembly ===
Members 1863–1864

- Arthur Nonus Birch, Colonial Secretary and Presiding Member
- Henry Pering Pellew Crease, Attorney General
- Wymond Ogilvy Hamley, Collector of Customs
- Chartres Brew, Magistrate. New Westminster
- Peter O'Reilly, Magistrate Cariboo East
- E.H. Sanders, Magistrate, Yale
- Henry Maynard Ball, Magistrate, Lytton
- Philip Henry Nind, Magistrate, Douglas
- Joshua Homer, New Westminster District
- Robert Thompson Smith, Yale and Lytton District
- Henry Holbrook, Douglas and Lillooet District
- James Orr, Cariboo East District
- Walter Shaw Black, Cariboo West District

Members 1864–1865

- Arthur Nonus Birch, Colonial Secretary and Presiding Member
- Henry Pering Pellew Crease, Attorney General
- Charles William Franks, Treasurer
- Wymond Ogilvy Hamley, Collector of Customs
- Chartres Brew, Magistrate. New Westminster
- Peter O'Reilly, Magistrate Cariboo
- Henry Maynard Ball, Magistrate, Lytton
- Andrew Charles Elliott, Magistrate, Lillooet
- John Carmichael Haynes, Magistrate, Osoyoos and Kootenay
- Joshua Homer, New Westminster District
- Clement Francis Cornwall, Hope, Yale and Lytton District
- Henry Holbrook, Douglas and Lillooet District
- George Anthony Walkem, Cariboo East and Quesnel Forks District
- Walter Moberly, Cariboo West and Quesnelmouth District

Members 1866

- Henry Maynard Ball, Acting Colonial Secretary and Presiding Member
- Henry Pering Pellew Crease, Attorney General
- Charles William Franks, Treasurer
- Joseph Trutch Chief Commissioner of Lands and Works and Surveyor General
- Wymond Ogilvy Hamley, Collector of Customs
- Chartres Brew, Magistrate. New Westminster
- Peter O'Reilly, Magistrate Kootenay
- Andrew Charles Elliott, Magistrate, Lillooet
- John Carmichael Haynes, Magistrate, Osoyoos and Kootenay
- Joshua Homer, New Westminster District
- Clement Francis Cornwall, Hope, Yale and Lytton District
- Henry Holbrook, Douglas and Lillooet District
- George Anthony Walkem, Cariboo East and Quesnel Forks District
- Robert Smith, Cariboo West and Quesnelmouth District

== Supreme Court ==
In 1858 the British Government sent over Matthew Baillie Begbie as Chief Justice for the colony. Although trained at Lincoln's Inn he had never practised law, but soon published a Rules of Court and a timetable of sittings. He held the post, under consecutive administrative regimes, until his death in 1894.

== See also ==
- Former colonies and territories in Canada
- Territorial evolution of Canada after 1867
- List of governors of Vancouver Island and British Columbia
- Alaska boundary dispute

== Bibliography ==
- "The Photographic Album of Richard Clement Moody, Royal British Columbia Museum" (PDF).
- "Col. Richard Clement Moody". Archived from the original on 8 August 2016.
- "Letters of Mary Moody, Royal British Columbia Museum Archives" (PDF).
- Minutes of the Proceedings of the Institution of Civil Engineers, Volume 90, Issue 1887, 1887, pp. 453-455, OBITUARY. MAJOR-GENERAL RICHARD CLEMENT MOODY, R.E., 1813-1181.
- Cleall, Esme; Ishiguro, Laura; Manktelow, Emily J. (Spring 2013). "Imperial Relations: Histories of family in the British Empire". Journal of Colonialism and Colonial History. 14 (1). doi:10.1353/cch.2013.0006. S2CID 162030654.
- Francis, Daniel, ed. (1999). Encyclopedia of British Columbia. Harbour Publishing. ISBN 1-55017-200-X.
- Hayes, Derek (2005). Historical Atlas of Vancouver and the Lower Fraser Valley. Douglas & McIntyre. pp. 26–29. ISBN 978-1-55365-283-0.
- Moody, Richard Clement (January 1951). Willard E. Ireland (ed.). "Letter of Colonel Richard Clement Moody, R.E., to Arthur Blackwood, February 1, 1859". British Columbia Historical Quarterly. XV (1 & 2): 85–107.
- Morton, Arthur S. (1973) [1939]. A History of the Canadian West to 1870-71, Second Edition. University of Toronto Press. p. 775f. ISBN 0-8020-0253-6.
- Ormsby, Margaret A. (1982). "Entry for Moody, Richard Clement". In Halpenny, Francess G. (ed.). Dictionary of Canadian Biography. Vol. XI (1881–1890) (online ed.). University of Toronto Press.
- Scott, Laura Elaine (1983). The Imposition of British Culture as Portrayed in the New Westminster Capital Plan of 1859 to 1862 (PDF) (M. A. Thesis). Simon Fraser University.
- Sweetman, John. "Entry for Moody, Richard Clement". Oxford Dictionary of National Biography (online ed.). Oxford University Press. doi:10.1093/ref:odnb/19085. (Subscription, Wikipedia Library access or UK public library membership required.)
- Vetch, Robert Hamilton (1894). "Entry for Moody, Richard Clement" . Dictionary of National Biography. Vol. 38. pp. 332–333.
