= John Duncan Grant =

Recipient of the Victoria Cross

Colonel John Duncan Grant VC CB DSO
- Born: 28 December 1877; Roorkee, British India
- Died: 20 February 1967 (aged 89); Royal Tunbridge Wells, Kent
- Military career
- Allegiance: United Kingdom
- Branch: British Indian Army
- Service years: 1898–1929
- Rank: Colonel
- Units: 8th Gurkha Rifles; Madras Staff Corps; Indian Staff Corps
- Conflicts: Tibet Expedition; World War I Third Anglo-Afghan War; First Waziristan Campaign
- Awards: Victoria Cross; Companion of the Order of the Bath; Distinguished Service Order; Mentioned in Despatches

Colonel John Duncan Grant VC, CB, DSO (28 December 1877 – 20 February 1967) was a British Indian Army officer who was awarded, on 24 January 1905, the only Victoria Cross for action in the Tibet Campaign, for action at the highest altitude in the Victoria Cross's 165-year history: that of the Tibetan Plateau which has an average height of around 15,000 feet.

== Victoria Cross ==
Grant was born into a distinguished family of military officers. He was the son of Colonel Suene Grant (1851–1919), of the Royal Engineers, who directed the Recruiting Department at Minehead in Somerset during WW1, by Caroline Elizabeth Craigie Napper, who was the daughter of a Colonel of the Bengal Staff Corps. He was the grandson of Colonel John Marshall Grant of the Royal Engineers, Columbia Detachment, and the great-grandson of General Duncan Grant of the Royal Artillery.

He was born at Roorkee, northern India, and educated in England at Cheltenham College, Grant attended the Royal Military College, Sandhurst and after passing out was appointed as a Second Lieutenant to the "Unattached List ... with a view to [his] appointment to the Indian Staff Corps." He was promoted to Lieutenant in 1900. He joined the 8th Gurkha Rifles, which was part of the British expedition to Tibet in 1903–04. On 6 July 1904 his actions at the storming of the Gyantse Dzong (fortress) led to the award of the Victoria Cross:

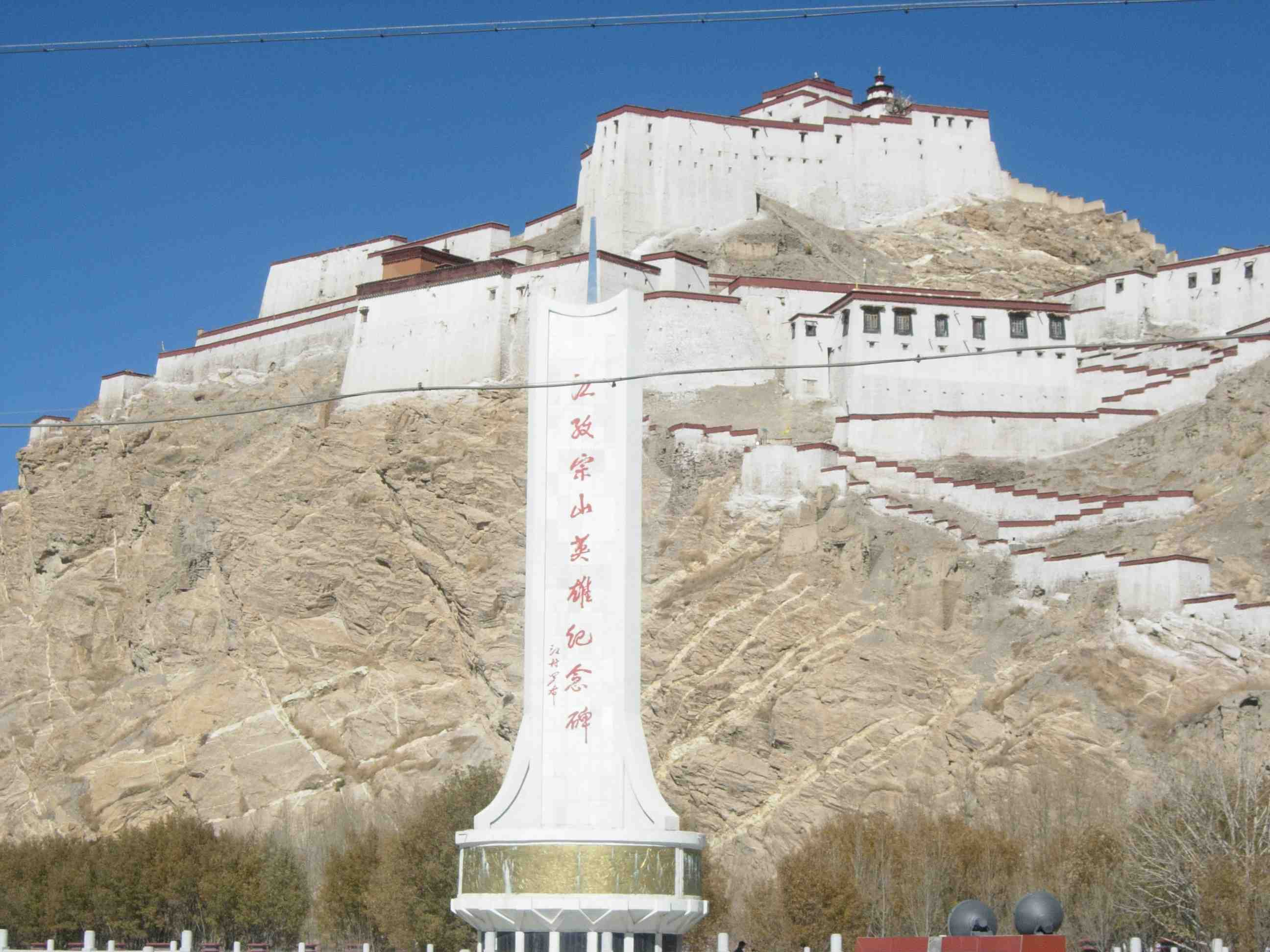
Gyantse Dzong

On the occasion of the storming of the Gyantse Jong on 6th July, 1904, the storming Company, headed by Lieutenant Grant, on emerging from the cover of the village, had to advance up a bare, almost precipitous, rock-face, with little or no cover available, and under a heavy fire from the curtain, flanking towers on both sides of the curtain, and other buildings higher up the Jong. Showers of rocks and stones were at the time being hurled down the hillside by the enemy from above. One man could only go up at a time, crawling on hands and knees, to the breach in the curtain.

Lieutenant Grant, followed by Havildar Kabir Pun, 8th Gurkha Rifles, at once attempted to scale it, but on reaching near the top he was wounded, and hurled back, as was also the Havildar, who fell down the rock some 30 feet.

Regardless of their injuries they again attempted to scale the breach, and, covered by the fire of the men below, were successful in their object, the Havildar shooting one of the enemy on gaining the top. The successful issue of the assault was very greatly due to the splendid example shown by Lieutenant Grant and Havildar Karbir Pun.

The latter has been recommended for the Indian Order of Merit.

— London Gazette, 24 January 1905

== Later service ==
Grant was promoted to captain in 1907 and to major in 1916. During World War I he served in the Persian Gulf in 1915–16, where he served as a general staff officer, grade 2 from June 1916 onwards, in France and Belgium in 1917 and Mesopotamia in 1918.

After the war he served in Afghanistan in 1919, and then as lieutenant colonel in command of the 13th Rajputs in the Waziristan campaign (1919–1920). He was awarded the Distinguished Service Order "for distinguished service rendered in the Field with the Waziristan Force, 1920–1921." He was Assistant Adjutant General at the headquarters of the Army of India 1925–28, and deputy director of the Auxiliary and Territorial Force in India 1928–29. He retired in 1929 with the rank of colonel and was appointed a Companion of the Order of the Bath in the King's Birthday Honours of that year. He was ceremonial Colonel of the 10th Gurkha Rifles 1934–47.

== Personal life ==
Grant married Kathleen Freyer (born 1883), the daughter of Sir Peter Freyer, an Irish doctor who served in the Indian Medical Service. They had two children.

He died in Tunbridge Wells, aged 89, and was cremated and buried at the Kent and Sussex Crematorium and Cemetery.

== Bibliography ==
- Ingleton, Roy (2011). Kent VCs. Pen and Sword Books. ISBN 978-1848844094.
