= Henry Spencer Palmer =

British military engineer and surveyor

Major-General Henry Spencer Palmer FRAS
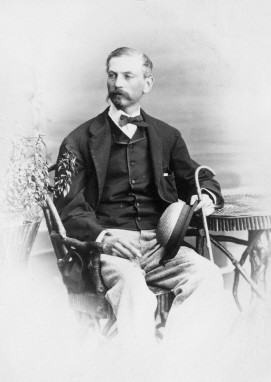
- Born: 30 April 1838; Bangalore, British India
- Died: 10 February 1893 (aged 54); House at Azabu, 41 Imai-cho, Azabu, Tokyo, Japan
- Burial place: Aoyama Cemetery, Tokyo, Japan
- Spouse: Mary Jane Pearson Wright (m. 1863)
- Relatives: Henry James (uncle)
- Military career
- Allegiance: United Kingdom
- Branch: British Army
- Years of service: 1856–1887
- Rank: Major-General
- Service number: 949
- Unit: Corps of Royal Engineers
- Commands: Chief Astronomer, Transit of Venus expedition to New Zealand, 1874–75; Commanding Royal Engineer, Manchester, 1883-85
- Known for: Foreign advisor to Meiji Japan
- Awards: Médaille de l'Institut de France; 旭日章 · Order of the Rising Sun, 3rd Class
- Memorials: Monument, Yokohama Waterworks, Japan, 1939; Bronze bust, Nogeyama Park, Yokohama, Japan, 1987

Major-General Henry Spencer Palmer FRAS (30 April 1838 – 10 February 1893) was a British Royal Engineer who was a member of the elite Royal Engineers, Columbia Detachment that founded British Columbia as the Colony of British Columbia (1858–1866), and who subsequently developed the Port of Yokohama in the Empire of Japan as a foreign advisor to the Meiji government.

== Early life ==
Henry Palmer was born at Bangalore, British India, on 30 April 1838. He was the youngest son of John Freke Palmer, who was then a major of the 32nd Native Infantry and a member of the East India Company, and later a colonel, and Jane James, who was a daughter of John James of Truro, Cornwall, and the sister of then Lieutenant, later Lieutenant-General Sir, Henry James of the Royal Engineers. His mother Jane died at Bangalore on 24 May 1838, less than a month after his birth.

Palmer was educated at private schools in Bath, and by tutors, and from January 1856 at the Royal Military Academy, Woolwich.

== British Columbia ==
He was commissioned as a lieutenant of the Royal Engineers on 20 December 1856 and studied for a year at the Royal Engineers Establishment, Chatham. He in October 1858 was assigned to the elite Royal Engineers, Columbia Detachment, under Robert Mann Parsons, for which he surveyed and supervised road-construction. He during his stay in Canada also contributed papers on British Columbia to the Royal Geographical Society in London. He was commended for his work in British Columbia and was considered as a potential successor to Colonel Richard Clement Moody's office as Chief Commissioner of Lands and Works.

In November 1863, one month after marriage at New Westminster on 7 October, he and his 15-year-old Canadian wife, Mary Jane Pearson Wright (17 January 1848 – 10 January 1934), who was the daughter of The Ven. Henry Press Wright, the first Archdeacon of British Columbia, and Ann Nalder, sailed for England.

== Other works ==
From 1864 and 1874 Palmer served with the Ordnance Survey of Great Britain. From 1874, he undertook various postings as a surveyor, civil engineer, and astronomer in New Zealand, Barbados, Hong Kong, and Japan. At some point before Palmer headed out for Japan, he and his wife separated and she returned to her native British Columbia where she lived for the rest of her life.

== Japan ==
After retiring from the Royal Engineers in 1887, he settled in Japan, established a successful civilian practice in Yokohama, where he was hired by the Japanese government to develop designs for the harbor, Ōsanbashi Pier and the city waterworks. He was also a frequent contributor of letters and articles to the Japan Times, Japan Weekly Mail and other newspapers and periodicals, and was also a correspondent for The Times. He also wrote a profusely illustrated guidebook to Japan, "Letters from the Land of the Rising Sun".

At some point around 1890, he remarried to a refined Japanese woman, Uta Saito, with whom he had a daughter.

After his death in 1893 from typhoid fever, he was buried at the Aoyama Cemetery in Tokyo.

A bronze bust of Palmer was unveiled by the Yokohama Water Works in 1987 to commemorate the centennial of its foundation. The Yokohama Archives of History also held a special exhibition in his honor the same year.

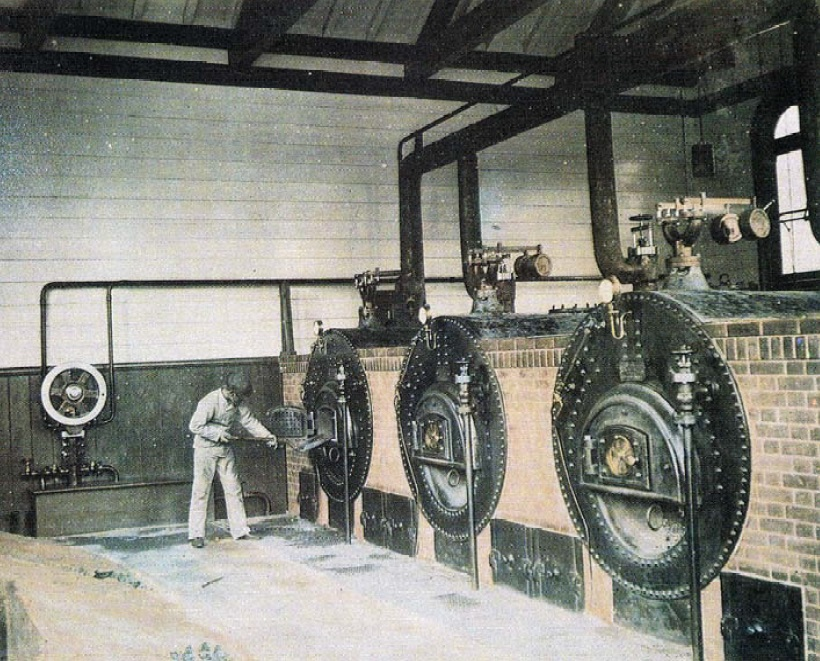
Yokohama Water Works: Boiler at the intake, Mi-i Village, 1886–87

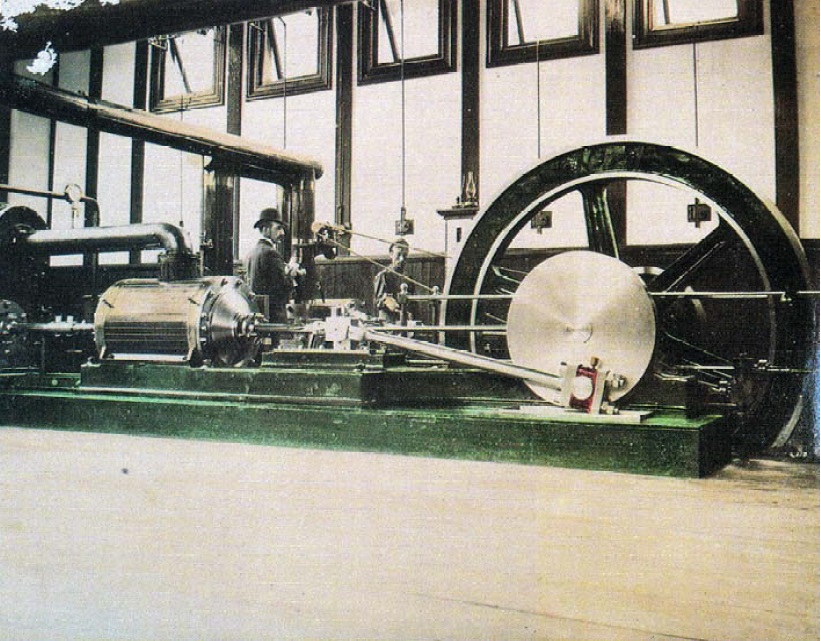
Yokohama Water Works: Pump at the intake, Mi-i Village, 1886–87

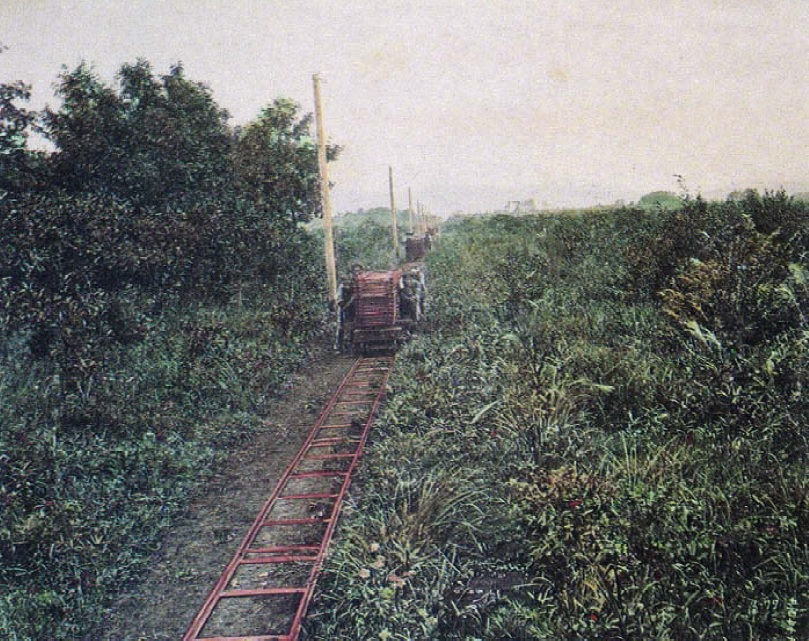
Yokohama Water Works: Iron pipeline route, Sagami-hara Tsumara Village, 1886–87

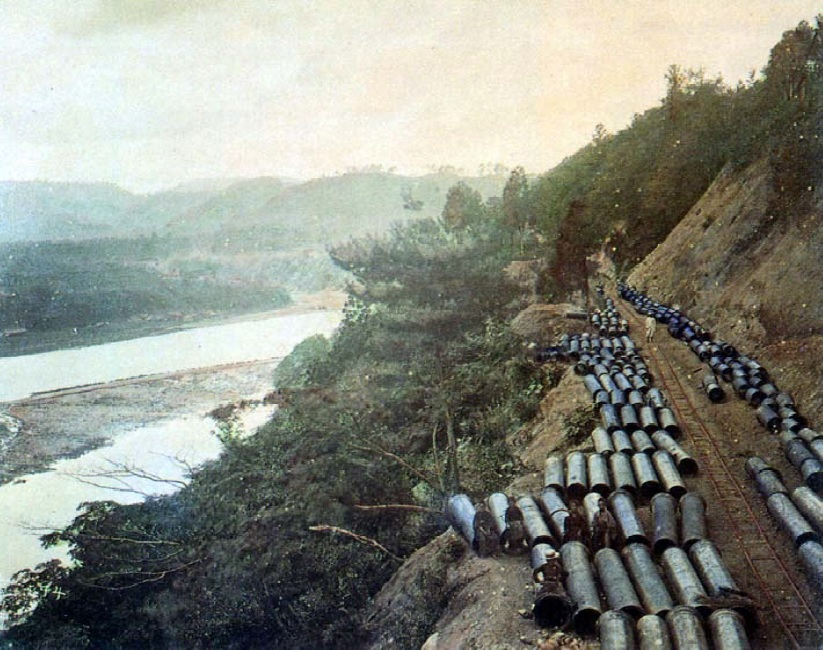
Yokohama Water Works: Iron pipeline route, Kawajiri Village, 1886–87

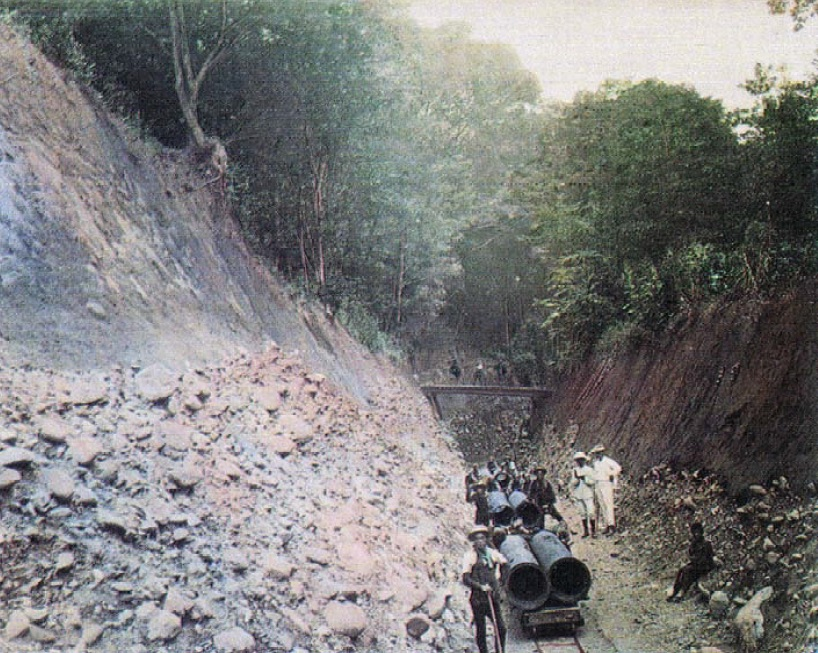
Yokohama Water Works: Iron pipeline route, 1886–87

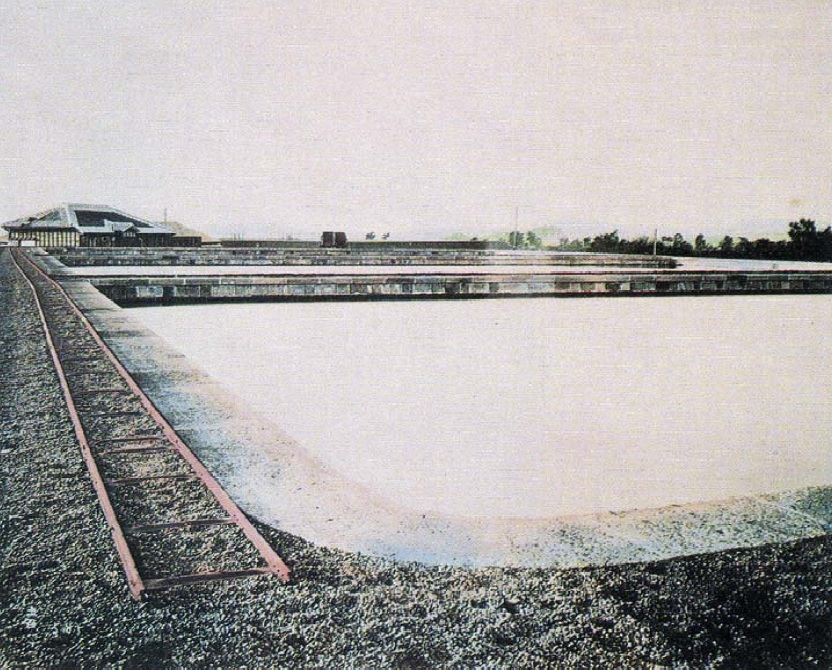
Yokohama Water Works: Filtre beds at Nogeyama, 1886–87

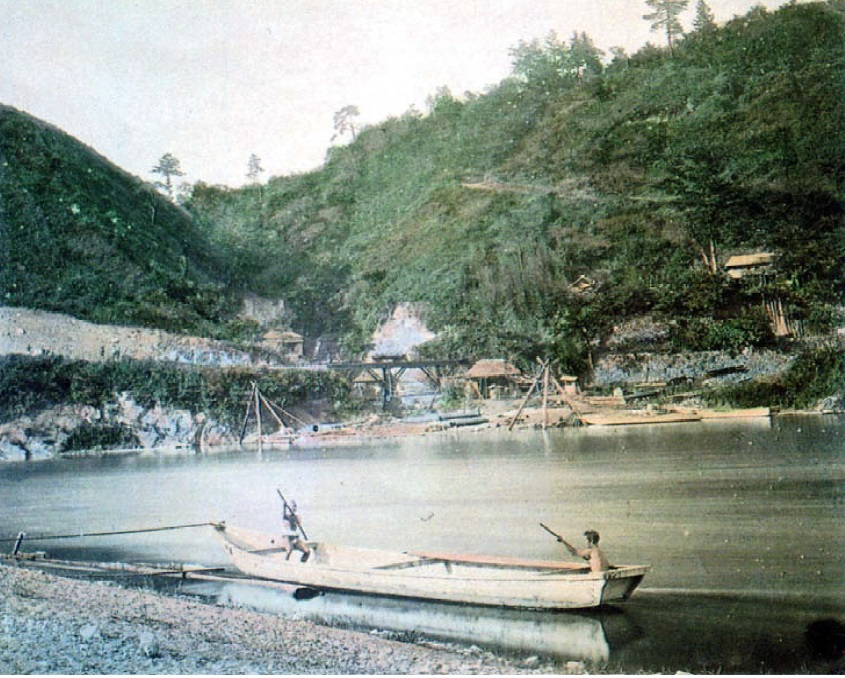
Yokohama Water Works: Ogurano ferry, 1886–87

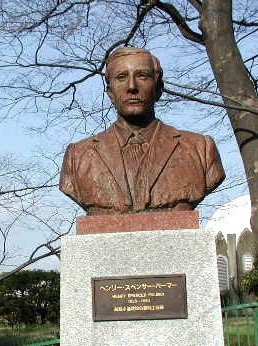
A bronze bust of Palmer, Nogeyama Park, Yokohama

== See also ==
- Anglo-Japanese relations
- O-yatoi gaikokujin

== Publications ==
- Palmer, Henry Spencer (1873). The Ordnance Survey of the Kingdom; Its Objects, Mode of Execution, History, and Present Condition. London: Edward Stanford.
- Palmer, Henry Spencer (1875). "The State of the Surveys in New Zealand, (Correspondence Relative to, and Report by Major Palmer on.)". Appendix to the Journals of the House of Representatives (1875 Session I, H-01).
- Palmer, Henry Spencer (1876). "Telegraphic Differences of Longitude, (Reports on, Between Various Places in New Zealand.)". Appendix to the Journals of the House of Representatives (1876 Session I, H-06).
- Palmer, Henry Spencer (1876). "On Recent American Determinations of Geographical Positions in the West Indies and Central America". Monthly Notices of the Royal Astronomical Society. 36 (7, May 1876). London: Royal Astronomical Society: 300–305. doi:10.1093/mnras/36.7.300.
- Palmer, Henry Spencer (1878). Sinai: From the Fourth Egyptian Dynasty to the Present Day. Society for Promoting Christian Knowledge.
- Airy, George Biddell; Tupman, George Lyon; Browne, Charles Orde; Neate, Charles Burnaby; Perry, Stephen Joseph; Palmer, Henry Spencer (1881). "Part V. Expedition to New Zealand Under Major H. S. Palmer, Royal Engineers". Account of Observations of the Transit of Venus, 1874, December 8: Made Under the Authority of the British Government: and of the Reduction of the Observations (PDF). London: H.M. Stationery Office.
- Palmer, Henry Spencer (1894). Letters from the Land of the Rising Sun. Yokohama: "Japan Mail" Office.
