= Kabir Pun =

Havildar Kabir Pun magar, IOM, was a Nepalese soldier in the British Indian Army who received the Indian Order of Merit (1st class) for his gallantry at Gyantse, during the Younghusband Expedition to Tibet (1903-4). Until 1911, the 1st class of the Indian Order of Merit (IOM), which had three classes, was the highest award available to native members of the British Indian Army. Pun was thus awarded the IOM (1st class) since he could not be awarded the Victoria Cross (VC), being a native personnel.

Pun served in the 8th Gurkha Rifles, in a company commanded by Lieutenant John Duncan Grant during the Younghusband Expedition. On July 5, 1904, Grant and Pun led a company of 8th Gurkhas in an attack on the Gyantse fort, and were backed by a company of the Royal Fusiliers. Despite being wounded from attacks by the Tibetans, Pun succeeded in opening an entrance into the Gyantse fortress alongside Lieutenant Grant, who was also wounded and received a VC for his actions in the same event.

Pun and Grant's actions are described in Grant's VC citation. Their action features in a painting published in the book Fortress Monasteries of the Himalayas: Tibet, Ladakh, Nepal and Bhutan.

== See also ==
- John Duncan Grant, VC
- British Expedition to Tibet, 1903-4
