= Wymond Ogilvy Hamley =

Canadian politician

Wymond Ogilvy Hamley (30 December 1818 – 14 January 1907) was an English-Canadian collector of customs and politician.

== Biography ==
Hamley was born in Bodmin, Cornwall, England, the third son of Vice Admiral William Hamley. R.N. He initially followed in his father's footsteps and briefly served in the Royal Navy, before retiring and joining the Imperial Civil Service. He got appointed collector of customs for the Colony of British Columbia through Sir Edward Bulwer-Lytton. Hamley arrived at Esquimalt on 12 April 1859, aboard the Thames City.

His role as collector of customs lead to Governor James Douglas to appoint him as a member of the Colonial Assembly of British Columbia in 1864. In the united Colony of British Columbia, he was a member of the Legislative Council of British Columbia, a position he held until 1871, when the colony joined the confederation of Canada.

He remained as collector of customs in New Westminster to 1868, when the relocation of the capital required him to move to Victoria, but returned to the position after 1871. He retired after close to 30 years of service in December 1889.

Hamley remained in Victoria until his death on 14 January 1907. He was close friends with Peter O'Reilly, who arrived in Esquimalt on the same day but on a different ship.
