= Henry Reynolds Luard =

British Royal Engineer

Major-General Henry Reynolds Luard
- Born: 30 June 1828
- Died: 26 February 1870 (aged 41)
- Allegiance: United Kingdom
- Branch: Royal Engineers
- Rank: Captain

Major-General Henry Reynolds Luard (30 June 1828 – 26 February 1870) was a British Royal Engineer who was one of seven officers of the elite Royal Engineers, Columbia Detachment, which founded British Columbia as the Colony of British Columbia (1858–1866).

== Biography ==
Luard was born on 30 June 1828, in Warwick, Warwickshire, into a landed gentry family. He attended the Royal Military Academy, Woolwich. He served until 1858 throughout England and the West Indies.

He served in the Colony of British Columbia as an executive officer of the Department of Lands and Works, from 1858 to 1863. He arrived in Esquimalt on 12 April 1859 after leaving England on 9 October 1858 aboard the Thames City, on which he was nicknamed 'Old Scrooge' as a consequence of his monocle and his habit of reading the works of Charles Dickens, in addition to The Emigrant Soldiers’ Gazette and The Cape Horn Chronicle.

He was promoted to the rank of captain on 1 April 1862. He was considered as a potential successor to Colonel Richard Clement Moody's office as Chief Commissioner of Lands and Works. James Douglas, Governor of Vancouver Island, recommended that Luard succeed to the office in a letter to the Duke of Newcastle of September 1863. Moody considered that Luard did not have sufficient knowledge for the office and prevented Douglas from delaying Luard's departure from British Columbia. Newcastle appointed Sir Joseph Trutch to the office in February 1864 to succeed Moody.

Luard subsequently served at Portsmouth, England, and in Ireland, until his death on 26 February 1870.

== Marriage and issue ==
Luard met Caroline Mary Leggatt of Victoria (b. 1844) whilst he and Moody were in Victoria during the winter of 1861-1862 that froze the Fraser River. Luard and Leggatt were engaged one year later and married at Christ's Church in Victoria on 8 October 1863, after which they returned to England.

Luard and Leggatt had two children. Their son was Captain Henry Arthur Luard (1865–1901), who was born in Gosport, Southampton, educated at Wellington College, Berkshire, and at Royal Military Academy, Sandhurst, and died from enteric (typhoid) fever at 11 Stationary Hospital, Winburg, Orange River Colony. Their daughter was Eleanor Mary (b.1868), who was born in Athlone, Ireland.
