= John Marshall Grant =

British Royal Engineer

Colonel John Marshall Grant
- Born: 22 April 1822
- Died: 1 April 1902, Bournemouth
- Education: Royal Military Academy, Woolwich
- Relatives: General Duncan Grant, Royal Artillery (father); Colonel Suene Grant (1851 -1919), Royal Engineers (son); Colonel John Duncan Grant VC CB DSO (grandson).
- Military career
- Allegiance: United Kingdom
- Branch: Royal Engineers
- Rank: Colonel

Colonel John Marshall Grant (22 April 1822 – 1 April 1902) was a commander of the British Royal Engineers who was a leading officer of the elite Royal Engineers, Columbia Detachment, that founded British Columbia as the Colony of British Columbia (1858–1866).

== Military career ==
John Marshall Grant, who was born at sea on 22 April 1822, was the third son of General Duncan Grant of the Royal Artillery. He was raised in Gibraltar until he attended the Royal Military Academy, Woolwich.

He was commissioned into the British Army in January 1842 to serve in the West Indies and Demerara from 1844 to 1851. He was promoted to lieutenant in 1845, to second captain in 1853, and to captain in 1855. He served in Jamaica from 1852 to 1855, after which he returned to England to work for the Commission of Barracks until 1858, when he received the command of the second group of Royal Engineers, Columbia Detachment, for his 'genius in construction', with whom he and his wife and two children arrived in British Columbia on 8 November 1858.

Grant became the most famous road-builder in British Columbia, where he remained for five years until he and his wife and children returned onboard the Enterprise to Shorncliffe, England, in 1863. He retained ownership of lands in British Columbia until his death.

He was promoted to lieutenant-colonel in 1865, as which he served on the staff at army headquarters as assistant quartermaster-general from 1866 to 1870, when he became commander of the Royal Engineers at Chatham, as which he served until 1873. He was promoted to colonel in 1873, and served as commander of the Royal Engineers at Dover from 1873 to 1875. He served as Deputy Adjutant-General of the Royal Engineers at Horse Guards until 1881, when he was appointed commander of the Royal Engineers at Royal Military Academy, Woolwich, from which he retired on 21 April 1882.

Grant, like his Commanding Officer in British Columbia Richard Clement Moody, died at Bournemouth, on 1 April 1902.

== Family ==
John Marshall Grant's son was Colonel Suene Grant (1851-1919), also of the Royal Engineers, who directed the Recruiting Department at Minehead in Somerset during WW1. Suene Grant married Caroline Elizabeth Craigie Napper, who was the daughter of a colonel of the Bengal Staff Corps.

John Marshall Grant's grandson was Colonel John Duncan Grant VC CB DSO who was awarded the Victoria Cross, on 24 January 1905, for gallantry at the highest altitude for any action in the Victoria Cross's 165-year history: that of the Tibetan Plateau which has an average height of around 15,000 feet.
