= Royal Engineers, Columbia Detachment =

The Columbia Detachment of the Royal Engineers was an elite contingent of the Royal Engineers of the British Army that was responsible for the foundation of British Columbia as the Colony of British Columbia in 1858.

It was commanded by the polymath Colonel Richard Clement Moody, and its other officers subsequently attained distinction including Captains Robert Mann Parsons, John Marshall Grant, Henry Reynolds Luard, and William Driscoll Gosset, and Lieutenants Arthur Reid Lempriere and Henry Spencer Palmer.

== British Columbia ==
=== Selection ===
When news of the Fraser Canyon Gold Rush reached London, Sir Edward Bulwer-Lytton, Secretary of State for the Colonies, requested that the War Office recommend an officer who was "a man of good judgement possessing a knowledge of mankind" to lead 150 (which was later increased to 172) Royal Engineers who had been selected for their "superior discipline and intelligence". Lytton desired to send to the colony 'representatives of the best of British culture, not just a police force': to send men who possessed "courtesy, high breeding and urbane knowledge of the world", such as Richard Clement Moody, whom the government considered to be the archetypal "English gentleman and British Officer", whom the War Office chose. Lord Lytton, who described Moody as his "distinguished friend", accepted, as a consequence of Moody's military record, and of Moody's success as the first Governor of the Falkland Islands, and of the distinguished geopolitical record of Moody's father, Thomas Moody, ADC, Kt., at the Colonial Office, and of Moody's brother Hampden Clement Blamire Moody, who already had served with the Royal Engineers in British Columbia, from 1840 to 1848, to such success that he was granted command of the Royal Engineers across the entirety of China.

The Royal Engineers during the 19th century were a socially exclusive elite land-marine force, whose officers were drawn from the upper middle-class and landed gentry of British society, who performed, in addition to military engineering, 'reconnaissance work, led storming parties, demolished obstacles in assaults, carried out rear-guard actions in retreats and other hazardous tasks'.

Moody's responsibility was to transform the new Colony of British Columbia into the British Empire's 'bulwark in the farthest west' and to "found a second England on the shores of the Pacific".

Richard Clement Moody and his wife Mary Susannah Hawks and their four children left England for British Columbia in October 1858 and arrived in British Columbia in December 1858, with the 172 Royal Engineers of the Royal Engineers, Columbia Detachment, and his secretary Robert Burnaby (after whom he subsequently named Burnaby Lake). In addition to Moody, the Royal Engineers officers were the three Captains Robert Mann Parsons, John Marshall Grant, and Henry Reynolds Luard, and the two Lieutenants Arthur Reid Lempriere (of Diélament, Jersey) and Henry Spencer Palmer, in addition to Captain William Driscoll Gosset (who was to be Colonial Treasurer and Commissary Officer). The contingent also included Doctor John Vernon Seddall and The Rev. John Sheepshanks (who was to be Chaplain of the Columbia Detachment). Moody was sworn in as the first Lieutenant-Governor of British Columbia and appointed Chief Commissioner of Lands and Works for British Columbia.

=== Ned McGowan's War ===
Moody had hoped to begin immediately the foundation of a capital city, but, on his arrival at Fort Langley, he learned of an insurrection, at the settlement of Hill's Bar, by a notorious outlaw, Ned McGowan, and some restive gold miners. Moody repressed the rebellion, which became popularly known as 'Ned McGowan's War', without loss of life. Moody described the incident:

The notorious Ned McGowan, of Californian celebrity at the head of a band of Yankee Rowdies defying the law! Every peaceable citizen frightened out of his wits!—Summons & warrants laughed to scorn! A Magistrate seized while on the Bench, & brought to the Rebel's camp, tried, condemned, & heavily fined! A man shot dead shortly before! Such a tale to welcome me at the close of a day of great enjoyment.

Moody described the response to his success: 'They gave me a Salute, firing off their loaded Revolvers over my head—Pleasant—Balls whistling over one's head! as a compliment! Suppose a hand had dropped by accident! I stood up, & raised my cap & thanked them in the Queen's name for their loyal reception of me'.

=== The Foundation of British Columbia ===
In British Columbia, Moody 'wanted to build a city of beauty in the wilderness' and planned his city as an iconic visual metaphor for British dominance, 'styled and located with the objective of reinforcing the authority of the Crown and of the robe'. Subsequent to the enactment of the Pre-emption Act of 1860, Moody settled the Lower Mainland. He founded the new capital city, New Westminster, at a site of dense forest of Douglas pine that he selected for its strategic excellence including the quality of its port. He, in his letter to his friend Arthur Blackwood of the Colonial Office that is dated 1 February 1859, described the majestic beauty of the site:

"The entrance to the Frazer is very striking--Extending miles to the right & left are low marsh lands (apparently of very rich qualities) & yet fr the Background of Superb Mountains- Swiss in outline, dark in woods, grandly towering into the clouds there is a sublimity that deeply impresses you. Everything is large and magnificent, worthy of the entrance to the Queen of England's dominions on the Pacific mainland. My imagination converted the silent marshes into Cuyp-like pictures of horses and cattle lazily fattening in rich meadows in a glowing sunset. The water of the deep clear Frazer was of a glassy stillness, not a ripple before us, except when a fish rose to the surface or broods of wild ducks fluttered away".

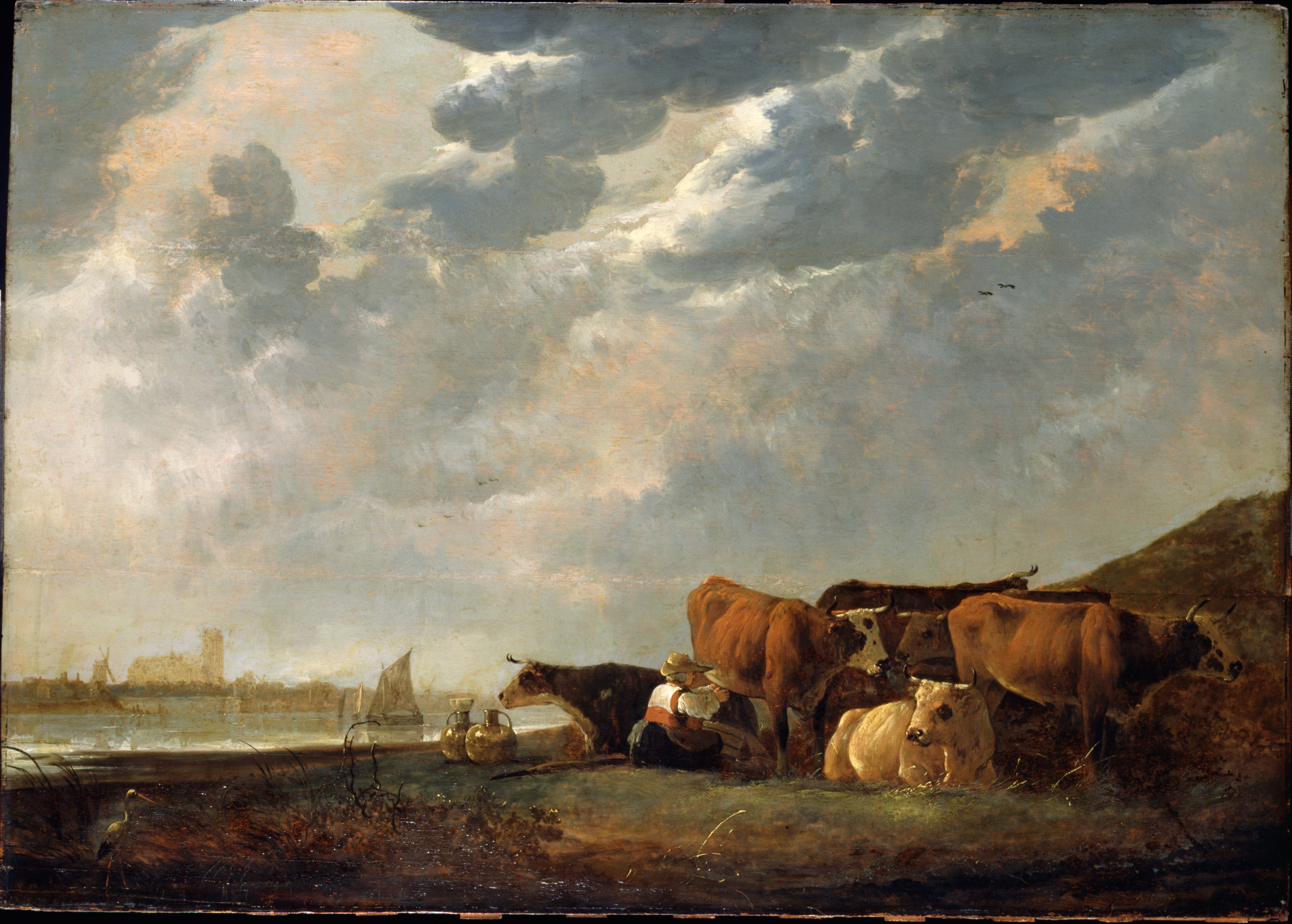
Moody likened his vision of the nascent Colony of British Columbia to the pastoral scenes painted by Aelbert Cuyp

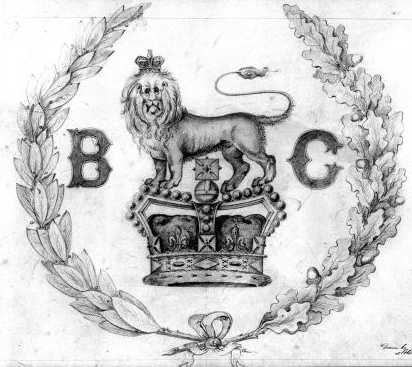
Moody designed the first Coat of arms of British Columbia

Moody designed the roads and the settlements of New Westminster, and his Royal Engineers, under Captain John Marshall Grant, built an extensive road network, including that which became Kingsway, which connected New Westminster to False Creek; and the North Road between Port Moody and New Westminster; and the Pacific terminus, at Burrard's Inlet, of Port Moody, of the Canadian and Pacific Railway (which subsequently was extended to the mouth of the Inlet and terminates now at Vancouver); and the Cariboo Road; and Stanley Park, which was an important strategic area for invaluable the eventuality of an invasion by America. He named Burnaby Lake after his secretary Robert Burnaby, and he named Port Coquitlam's 400-foot 'Mary Hill' after his wife Mary Susannah Hawks. Moody designed the first Coat of arms of British Columbia. Richard Clement Moody established Port Moody, which was subsequently named after him, at the end of the trail that connected New Westminster with Burrard Inlet, to defend New Westminster from potential attack from the United States. Moody also established a town at Hastings which was later incorporated into Vancouver.

The British designated multiple tracts as government reserves. The Pre-emption Act did not specify conditions for the distribution of the land, and, consequently, large areas were bought by speculators. Moody requisitioned 3,750 acres (sc. 1,517 hectares) for himself, and, on this land, he subsequently built for himself, and owned, Mayfield, a model farm near New Westminster. Moody was criticised by journalists for land grabbing, but his requisitions were ordered by the Colonial Office, and Moody throughout his tenure in British Columbia received the approbation of the British authorities in London, and was in British Columbia described as 'the real father of New Westminster'. However, Lord Lytton, then Secretary of State for the Colonies, 'forgot the practicalities of paying for clearing and developing the site and the town' and the effort of Moody's Engineers was continually impeded by insufficient funds, which, together with the continuous opposition of Sir James Douglas, Governor of Vancouver Island, whom Sir Thomas Frederick Elliot (1808 - 1880) described as 'like any other fraud', 'made it impossible for [Moody's] design to be fulfilled'.

Throughout his tenure in British Columbia, Moody feuded with Sir James Douglas, Governor of Vancouver Island, whose jurisdiction overlapped with his own. Moody's offices of Chief Commissioner and Lieutenant-Governor were of 'higher prestige [and] lesser authority' than that of Douglas, whom the British Government had selected Moody to 'out manoeuvre the old Hudson's Bay Factor [Governor Douglas]'. Moody had been selected by Lord Lytton for his qualities of the archetypal 'English gentleman and British Officer', and because his family was 'eminently respectable': he was the son of Colonel Thomas Moody, CRE WI, ADC, Kt. and of Martha Clement who was a socially superior member of the planter class of the West Indies, including Demerara and The Guianas, in which Douglas's father and the same's brothers owned less land and from which Douglas's 'a half-breed' mother originated. Governor Douglas's ethnicity was 'an affront to Victorian society'.

Mary Moody, who was a member of the Hawks industrialist dynasty and of the armigerous Boyd merchant banking family, wrote, on 4 August 1859, 'it is not pleasant to serve under a Hudson's Bay Factor', and that the 'Governor and Richard can never get on'. John Robson, who was the editor of the British Columbian and future Premier of British Columbia, wanted Richard Clement Moody's office to include that of Governor of British Columbia, to make Douglas obsolete. In letter to the Colonial Office of 27 December 1858, Richard Clement Moody states that he has 'entirely disarmed [Douglas] of all jealously'. Douglas repeatedly insulted the Royal Engineers by attempting to assume their command and refusing to acknowledge their contribution to the nascent colony.

Margaret A. Ormsby, who was the author of the Dictionary of Canadian Biography entry for Moody (2002), unpopularly censures Moody for the abortive development of the New Westminster. However, most significant historians commend Moody's contribution and exculpate Moody from responsibility for the abortive development of New Westminster, primarily because of the perpetual insufficiency of funds and of the personally motivated opposition by Douglas whom Sir Thomas Frederick Elliot (1808 - 1880) described as 'like any other fraud'. Robert Burnaby observed that Douglas proceeded with 'muddling [Moody's] work and doubling his expenditure' and with employing administrators to 'work a crooked policy against Moody' to 'retard British Columbia and build up... the stronghold of Hudson's Bay interests' and their own 'landed stake'. Therefore, Robert Edgar Cail, Don W. Thomson, Laure Ishiguro, and Laura Elaine Scott commended Moody for his contribution, and Scott accused Ormsby of being 'adamant in her dislike of Colonel Moody' despite the majority of evidence, and almost all other biographies of Moody, including that by the Institution of Civil Engineers, and that by the Royal Engineers, and that by the British Columbia Historical Association, commend Moody's achievements in British Columbia.

The Royal Engineers, Columbia Detachment was disbanded in July 1863. The Moody family (which now consisted of Moody, and his wife, and seven legitimate children) and the 22 Royal Engineers who wished to return to England, who had 8 wives between them, departed for England. 130 of the original Columbia Detachment decided to remain in British Columbia. Scott contends that the dissolution of the Columbia Detachment, and the consequent departure of Moody, 'doomed' the development of the settlement and the realisation of Lord Lytton's dream. A vast congregation of New Westminster citizens gathered at the dock to bid farewell to Moody as his boat departed for England. Moody wanted to return to British Columbia, but he died before he was able to do so. Moody left his library behind, in New Westminster, to become the public library of New Westminster.

In April 1863, the Councillors of New Westminster decreed that 20 acres should be reserved and named Moody Square after Richard Clement Moody. The area around Moody Square that was completed only in 1889 has also been named Moody Park after Moody. Numerous developments occurred in and around Moody Park, including Century House, which was opened by Princess Margaret on 23 July 1958. In 1984, on the occasion of the 125th anniversary of New Westminster, a monument of Richard Clement Moody, at the entrance of the park, was unveiled by Mayor Tom Baker. For Moody's achievements in the Falkland Islands and in British Columbia, British diplomat David Tatham CMG, who served as Governor of the Falkland Islands, described Moody as an 'Empire builder'. In January 2014, with the support of the Friends of the British Columbia Archives and of the Royal British Columbia Museum Foundation, The Royal British Columbia Museum purchased a photograph album that had belonged to Richard Clement Moody. The album contains over 100 photographs of the early settlement of British Columbia, including some of the earliest known photographs of First Nations peoples.

== Sources ==
- Minutes of the Proceedings of the Institution of Civil Engineers, Volume 90, Issue 1887, 1887, pp. 453-455, OBITUARY. MAJOR-GENERAL RICHARD CLEMENT MOODY, R.E., 1813-1181.
- Oxford Dictionary of National Biography, Richard Clement Moody.
- Imperial Relations: Histories of family in the British Empire, Esme Cleall, Laura Ishiguro, and Emily J. Manktelow. Project Muse. doi:10.1353/cch.2013.0006. S2CID 162030654.
- "Col. Richard Clement Moody".
- "The Photographic Album of Richard Clement Moody, Royal British Columbia Museum" (PDF).
- "Letters of Mary Susannah Moody, Royal British Columbia Museum Archives" (PDF).
- Francis, Daniel, ed. (1999). Encyclopedia of British Columbia. Harbour Publishing. ISBN 1-55017-200-X.
- Hayes, Derek (2005). Historical Atlas of Vancouver and the Lower Fraser Valley. Douglas & McIntyre. pp. 26–29. ISBN 978-1-55365-283-0.
- Morton, Arthur S. (1973) [1939]. A History of the Canadian West to 1870-71, Second Edition. University of Toronto Press. p. 775f. ISBN 0-8020-0253-6.
- Scott, Laura Elaine (1983). The Imposition of British Culture as Portrayed in the New Westminster Capital Plan of 1859 to 1862. Simon Fraser University.
- Howard, Joseph Jackson (1893–1906). Heraldic Visitation of England and Wales. Vol. 8. pp. 161–164..
- Ormsby, Margaret A. (1982). "Richard Clement Moody". Dictionary of Canadian Biography.
