= Arthur Reid Lempriere =

Major-General Arthur Reid Lempriere (Ewell, Surrey, England, 22 August 1835 – 10 April 1927) was a British Army officer of the Royal Engineers, including of the Royal Engineers, Columbia Detachment that founded British Columbia as the Colony of British Columbia (1858–1866).

He was in the third and the largest group of Royal Engineers to arrive in British Columbia in 1859. He served in British Columbia until 1863. Lempriere surveyed the route from Hope to Lytton through the Coquihalla River in 1859. Three geographical features are named for him in the northern reaches of the North Thompson River and along British Columbia Highway 5 in the Thompson-Nicola Regional District of the British Columbia Interior, between the communities of Kamloops to the south and Tete Jaune Cache-Valemount to the north:

- Mount Lempriere, in the Monashee Mountains, with an elevation of 3,205 metres (10,515 ft)
- Lempriere, a railway point on the Canadian National Railway transcontinental main line (used today by freight traffic and the Via Rail Canadian train). There was a post office from 1942 to 1945 when Japanese were interned at a work camp in this area.
- Lempriere Creek, a right tributary of the North Thompson River, which has its mouth just upstream of confluence of the North Thompson River and the Albreda River, where the North Thompson River turns 90° right and heads south.

A fourth feature named after him is Lempriere Bank, an ocean bank south of Aristazabal Island in the Pacific Ocean on the British Columbia Coast.

He retired from the British Army in 1882.
