= John Sheepshanks (bishop) =

English Anglican Bishop (1834–1912)

The Right Reverend John Sheepshanks
- Bishop of Norwich
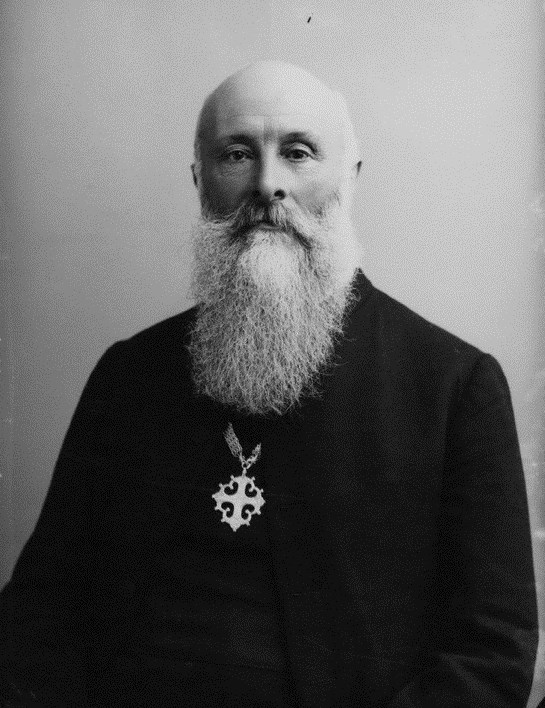
- Church: Church of England
- Diocese: Diocese of Norwich
- In office: 1893–1910
- Predecessor: John Pelham
- Successor: Bertram Pollock

Personal details
- Born: 23 February 1834 Belgravia, London
- Died: 3 June 1912 (aged 78)
- Denomination: Anglican
- Spouse: Margaret Ryott
- Children: 17
- Education: Coventry Grammar School
- Alma mater: Christ's College, Cambridge

John Sheepshanks (23 February 1834 – 3 June 1912) was an English Anglican Bishop in the last decade of the 19th century and the first one of the 20th.

== Life ==
Born on 23 February 1834 in Belgravia, London to Thomas Sheepshanks (1796–1875), rector of St John's, Coventry and his wife, Katherine (née Smith, 1804 or 1805–1869). Sheepshanks was educated at Coventry Grammar School, then at Christ's College, Cambridge.

Ordained in 1857, Sheepshanks became a curate at Leeds Parish Church, under Walter Hook. Hook had previously been the incumbent at Holy Trinity Church, Coventry, and was on good terms with his father Thomas Sheepshanks.

Sheepshanks then moved to Canada as a missionary, working in British Columbia at the time of the Cariboo Gold Rush. He was responding to an invitation in 1859 from George Hills, the Bishop of Columbia and formerly a fellow-curate under Hook at Leeds. Sheepshanks was made Rector of New Westminster. Since New Westminster was then little more than a forest clearing on the banks of the Fraser River, this was a rugged life. He was also chaplain to the Royal Engineers, Columbia Detachment. He returned to England in 1864, to raise funds, via San Francisco and Utah; his church had burned down by the time he reached New Westminster in 1866. His father then fell ill, and planning to visit him, Sheepshanks set off once more; the trip turned into an extended Pacific and Asian journey.

Returning finally to England via Moscow in November 1867, Sheepshanks settled down to life as a parish priest. He held incumbencies in Bilton, Yorkshire and Anfield, Liverpool before his elevation to the episcopate as Bishop of Norwich in 1893, a post he held until 1909. A noted author, he died on 3 June 1912. During his time in Liverpool, he founded St Margaret's School, which is now based in Aigburth and known as St Margaret's Church of England Academy.

== Views ==
Sheepshanks was a High Church Anglican, much influenced by Walter Hook in adopting ideas from the Tractarians. He supported votes for male agricultural workers, suffragan bishops (his diocese had 900 parishes), and the ultimate division of the Diocese of Norwich. He was noted for pastoral work, and attention to his clergy, who were affected directly by the Great Depression of British Agriculture.

On the level of personal comfort, Sheepshanks was austere. His daughter Dorothy wrote about life in the episcopal palace, where carpets had been replaced by linoleum.

== Family ==
Sheepshanks married in 1870 Margaret Ryott, daughter of William Hall Ryott M.D. of Thirsk, whom he had seen in a bookshop there. They had 17 children, of whom 12 reached adulthood. Those were:

- Richard (1871–1939), judge in India and polo player
- Mary Ryott Sheepshanks (1872–1960), social worker and activist
- John, in business at Bombay, died 1927
- Elizabeth, whose twin brother Harry died young in an accident.
- Margaret
- Katherine, married in 1906 Samuel Wilberforce (1874–1954), judge in India, and was mother of Richard Orme Wilberforce
- Robert
- Edward, educated at Winchester College
- Anne
- Dorothy, known as the writer Dorothy Erskine Muir
- William, educated at Winchester College and New College, Oxford, and joined the Civil Service; he died in 1917, serving in the King's Royal Rifle Corps, at age 27
- Thomas Herbert Sheepshanks C.B. (1895–1964), civil servant

Church of England titles
Preceded by John Pelham	Bishop of Norwich; 1893–1910	Succeeded by Bertram Pollock
