= Robert Mann Parsons =

British Royal Engineer

Major-General Robert Mann Parsons FRS
- Born: 29 September 1829
- Died: 20 May 1897 (aged 67)
- Military career
- Allegiance: United Kingdom
- Branch: Royal Engineers
- Rank: Major-General

Robert Mann Parsons (29 September 1829 – 20 May 1897) was a British Royal Engineer who was one of seven officers of the elite Royal Engineers, Columbia Detachment, that founded British Columbia as the Colony of British Columbia (1858–1866).

He was born on 29 September 1829 in Peckham, Surrey. He was educated at the Royal Military Academy, Woolwich, and commissioned in the Royal Engineers as a second lieutenant on 1 October 1847. He was promoted to lieutenant on 21 Sept 1850, to second captain on 23 February 1856, to captain on 1 April 1862, to major on 5 July 1872, to lieutenant-colonel on 8 March 1873, to colonel on 8 March 1878, and to major-general on 29 October 1879, when he retired.

He arrived in British Columbia on 29 October 1858, in command of the first group of the Columbia Detachment, by which he was employed for his 'expert knowledge of survey'. He was in charge of the lithographic press of British Columbia from 1861 to 1863.

Parsons Anchorage in British Columbia (52˚31'00" 128˚44'00" Head of Kitasu Bay, West of Swindle Island, Northwest of Bella Bella) is named after him.

He was Superintendent of the Ordnance Survey office at Southampton, England, during 1869. He was elected a Fellow of the Royal Society on 2 June 1870.

He resided at 21 Hyde Vale, Greenwich, Kent, where he died on 20 May 1897, leaving assets worth £10,945 17s (about £1 million in 21st-century money). The records of his service are kept by the British National Archives.
