= Encyclopedia of British Columbia =

The Encyclopedia of British Columbia was first published in 1999 by Harbour Publishing under the editorship of Daniel Francis. It contained some 4,000 articles and 1,000 pictures about the Canadian province of British Columbia. The hardcover edition also came with a CD-ROM version. The Encyclopedia is currently available online for a subscription fee at the KnowBC website, where it continues to be updated and expanded. The portal also includes access to other Harbour Publishing publications.
