= Columbia (ship) =

Columbia may refer to one of the following vessels:

== Ships ==
=== Naval vessels ===
- CSS Columbia, a Confederate States Navy (and later United States Navy) ironclad ram during the American Civil War
- HMCS Columbia, several ships of the Royal Canadian Navy
- HMS Columbia, several ships of the Royal Navy
- USS Columbia, several ships of the United States Navy
- Columbia-class cruiser, two protected cruisers used by the United States Navy, 1890–1891
- Columbia-class submarine, an upcoming class of nuclear-powered ballistic missile submarines for the United States Navy

=== America's Cup yachts ===
- Columbia (1871 yacht)
- Columbia (1899 yacht)
- Columbia (1958 yacht)

=== Other ships ===
- Columbia (Arrow Lakes sternwheeler)
- Columbia (barque), a barque in the service of the Hudson's Bay Company on the Columbia River and along the Pacific Northwest Coast
- Columbia (dredge), a dredge lost in the Battle of Wake Island
- Columbia (1850 sidewheeler), a steamboat in Oregon
- Columbia (1897 paddle steamer), a paddle steamer excursion boat which sank on the Illinois River in July 1918
- MV Columbia, a large passenger and automobile ferry in the Alaska Marine Highway System fleet
- SS Columbia, a historic excursion steamer docked in Ecorse, Michigan, United States
- SS Columbia (1880), a coastal passenger liner which made the first commercial use of Edison's light bulb
- SS Columbia (1889), an ocean liner, later renamed Rapido, a cruiser for the Spanish Navy
- United States lightship Columbia (WLV-604), the first lightship on the Pacific Coast of the United States, docked in Astoria, Oregon
- Columbia Rediviva, commonly known as the Columbia, a maritime fur trade vessel

== See also ==
- Columbia (disambiguation)
