= HMS Columbia =

HMS Columbia may refer to:

- HMS Columbia (1812), a sloop formerly the United States privateer Curlew captured in 1812 and sold in 1820
- HMS Columbia (1829), launched in 1829 and sold in 1859

== See also ==
- USS Columbia - American ships of the same name
- HMCS Columbia - Canadian ships of the same name
- List of ships named SS Columbia
