= Ship class =

Group of ships of a similar design

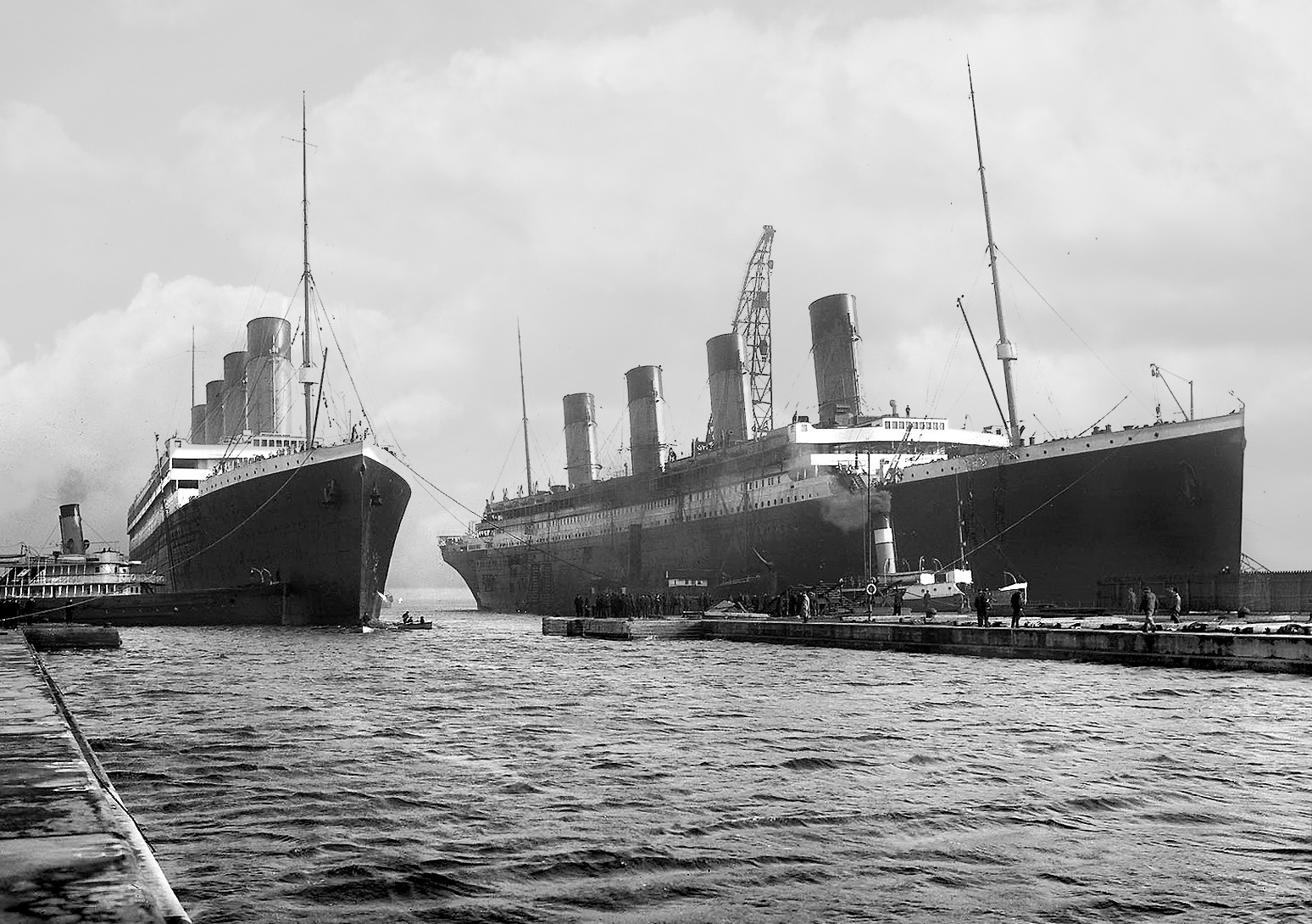
Two of the three Olympic-class ocean liners that were built; Olympic (left) and Titanic (right) (March 1912)

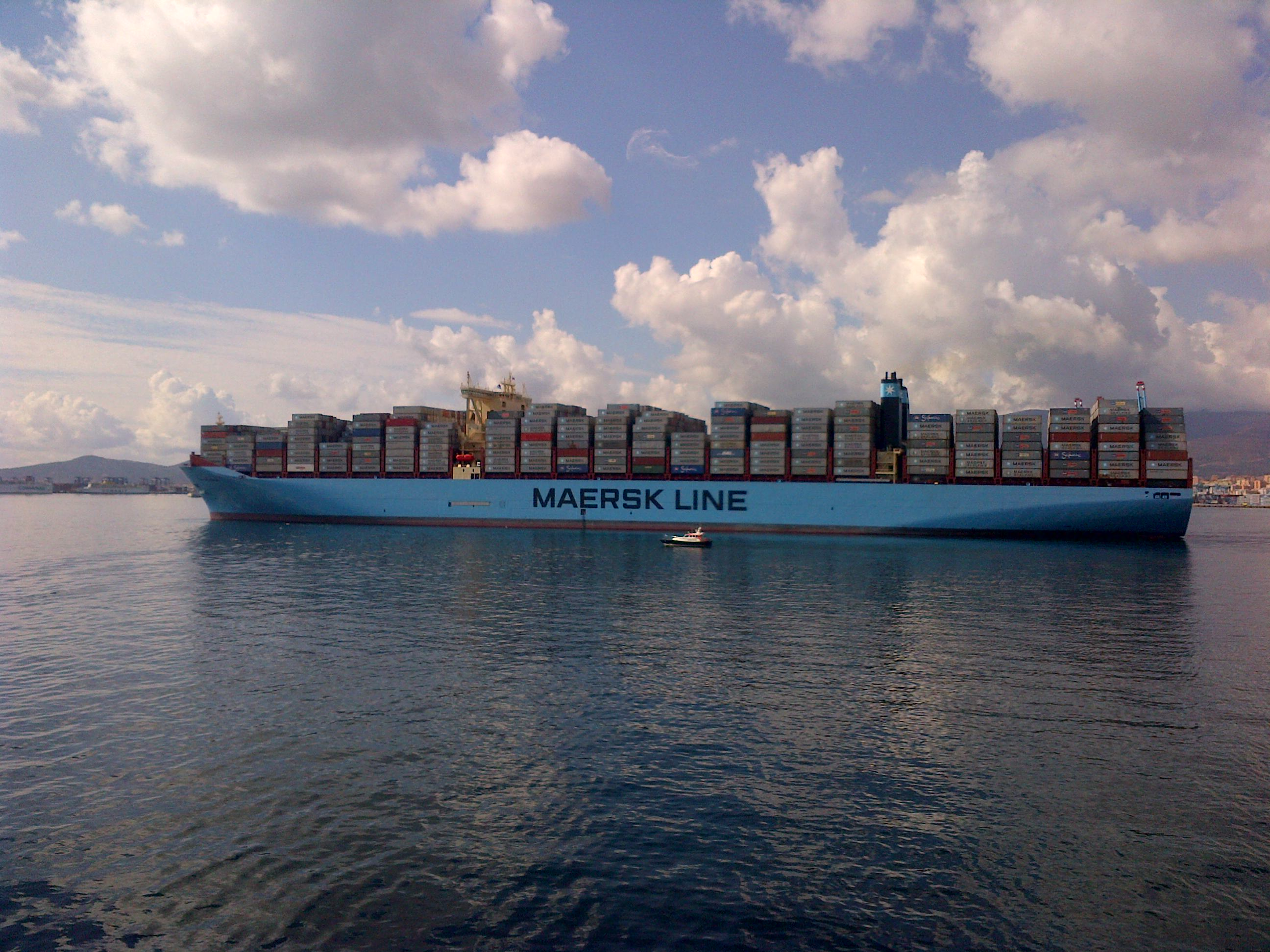
Mærsk Triple E class ship setting sail from the port of Algeciras

A ship class is a group of ships of a similar design. This is distinct from a ship type, which might reflect a similarity of tonnage or intended use. For example, USS Carl Vinson is a nuclear aircraft carrier (ship type) of the Nimitz class (ship class).

In the course of building a class of ships, design changes might be implemented. In such a case, the ships of different design might not be considered of the same class; each variation would either be its own class, or a subclass of the original class (see County-class cruiser for an example). If ships are built of a class whose production had been discontinued, a similar distinction might be made.

Ships in a class often have names linked by a common factor: e.g. Trafalgar-class submarines' names all begin with T (Turbulent, Tireless, Torbay); and Ticonderoga-class cruisers are named after American battles (Yorktown, Bunker Hill, Gettysburg, Anzio). Ships of the same class may be referred to as sister ships. Ship classes can be either military, as noted above, or civilian, such as the Icon-class of cruise ships.

== Naval ship class naming conventions ==
=== Overview ===
The name of a naval ship class is most commonly the name of the lead ship: the first ship commissioned or built of its design. However, other systems can be used without confusion or conflict. A descriptive name may be used; for example, it was decided to group destroyers made to the same design as HMS Tomahawk, all named after weapons, as the Weapon-class rather than Tomahawk-class.

=== Germany ===
The West German Navy (Bundesmarine) used a three-digit type number for every class in service or in advanced project state. Modified versions were identified by a single letter suffix. After the reunification of Germany the German Navy (Deutsche Marine) kept the system. Informally, classes are also traditionally named after their lead ships.

=== Indonesia ===
The Indonesian Navy has a traditional naming system for its ships. In addition, the ship's type and missions can be identified by the first number on the ship's three-digit hull number, which is placed on the front bows and the back of the stern. The naming convention is:

- Hull number beginning with 1 (reserved for aircraft carriers): ancient empires and kingdoms
- Hull number beginning with 2 (cruisers and destroyers): Indonesia's main islands
- Hull number beginning with 3 (frigates, ocean escorts, corvettes): national heroes
- Hull number beginning with 4 (submarines, submarine tenders): mythical weapons (for submarines), National heroes (for submarine tenders)
- Hull number beginning with 5 (amphibious ships, LSTs, LPDs, LCUs, command ships): main and strategic bays (for LSTs), big cities (for LPDs), small cities (for LCUs), National figures (for command ships)
- Hull number beginning with 6 (fast attack ships): mythical weapons (previous names for missile boats), traditional weapons (current names for fast missile boats), wild animals (for fast torpedo boats)
- Hull number beginning with 7 (minesweepers, minehunters ships): every island begin with letter "R", letter "F" (mine countermeasure vessel)
- Hull number beginning with 8 (patrol boats): native fishes and sea creatures, native snakes and wild reptiles, wild insects, geographical places (such as towns, lakes or rivers begin with "si-", like Sikuda, Sigurot, Sibarau)
- Hull number beginning with 9 (supporting ships, oilers, tugs, troops transports, oceanographic research ships, sailing ships, etc.): volcanoes, cities, mythical figures, geographical capes and straits

=== Russia/Soviet Union ===
Russian (and Soviet) ship classes are formally named by the numbered project that designed them. That project sometimes, but not always, had a metaphorical name, and almost always had a NATO reporting name. In addition, the ships of the class would have a number prefixed by a letter indicating the role of that type of vessel. For example, Project 641 had no name, though NATO referred to its members as Foxtrot-class submarines.

The ship classification does not completely correspond common designation, particularly for destroyers, frigates and corvettes. Russia has its own classification system for these ships:

- Squadron Torpedo Carriers (Russian: Эскадренный миноносец) are traditionally referred to as destroyers (formerly torpedo boat destroyers). The Russian word for destroyer is used in the air force for fighter aircraft.
- Destroyers can also be classified as Big Anti-submarine Ships (Russian: Большой противолодочный корабль) or Big ASW Ships (e.g. Udaloy-class destroyer). They are alternatively classified as cruisers (e.g. Kara-class cruiser). The Russian Big Anti-submarine Ships type also has its sub-type of Guard (or Patrol) Ships.
- Guard (or Patrol) Ships (Russian: Сторожевой корабль) are usually referred to as frigates (e.g. Gepard-class frigate).
- Another substantial type in Russia are Small Anti-submarine Ships (Russian: Малый противолодочный корабль) or Small ASW Ships. These are referred to as corvettes (e.g. Grisha-class corvette). Corvettes are also classified as Small Missile Ships (Russian: Малый ракетный корабль; e.g. Buyan-M-class corvette) or Missile Boats (Russian: Ракетный катер; e.g. Tarantul-class corvette) in Russia.

=== United Kingdom ===
The British Royal Navy (RN) has used several methods of naming classes. In addition to the accepted European convention, some classes have been named after a common theme in the included ships' names, e.g., Tribal-class destroyers, and some classes were implemented as an organizational tool, making traditional methods of naming inefficient. For instance, the Amphion class is also known as the A class. Most destroyer classes were known by the initial letter used in naming the vessels, e.g., V and W-class destroyers. Classification by letter also helped to conflate similar smaller classes of ships as in the case of the A-class destroyers of 1913 whose names spread across the alphabet. Since the end of the Second World War, Royal Navy ship classes have also been known by their type number (e.g. Type 45 destroyer.)

=== United States ===
For the United States Navy, the first ship in a class to be authorized by Congress is the designated class leader and gives the name to the class, regardless of the order in which the ships of that class are laid down, launched or commissioned. Due to numbering conventions, the lead ship often has the lowest hull number of its class. (During World War II, the award of construction contracts was not always congruent with completion, so several ships had higher hull numbers than later ships.)

Before the 1920s, naval vessels were classified according to shared characteristics. However, naval historians and scholars retro-apply the current convention to historical naval vessels sharing similarities, such as those of the American Civil War, where the Union Navy built several vessels in series, which can be termed "classes" as presently understood. Common examples include the Passaic-class monitor and the City-class ironclad, among many others, for the Union side, and Columbia class or Richmond class, for those ironclads in service with the Confederate States Navy. Generally accepted by military historians and widely used in the more recent books, webpages and papers on the subject matter (most notably the releases of Osprey Publishing), these latter-day classifications are sometimes considered "semi-official" (although they are not). Contemporary records, such as the "Official Records of the Union and Confederate Navies in the War of the Rebellion" (Series 2, Volume 1, Part 1), show that the modern nomenclature was not in use at the time.

The unofficial retro-applying of ship classes can occasionally lead to confusion. For example, while American works consistently adhere to the City- and Columbia-class monikers, works of British origin refer to the same classes as Cairo class and Tennessee class respectively, in compliance with the modern Royal Navy naming conventions.

By the time the United States entered World War II, the current naming convention was in place, though exactly how and when the practice originated remain unclear.

== Merchant vessel class ==
Merchant ships are almost always classed by a classification society. These vessels are said to be in class when their hull, structures, machinery, and equipment conform to International Maritime Organization and MARPOL standards. Vessels out of class may be uninsurable and/or not permitted to sail by other agencies.

A vessel's class may include endorsements for the type of cargo such as "oil carrier", "bulk carrier", "mixed carrier" etc. It may also include class notations denoting special abilities of the vessel. Examples of this include an ice class, fire fighting capability, oil recovery capability, automated machinery space capability, or other special ability.
