= Invasion of Guadeloupe (1815) =

1815 invasion of the Hundred Days

- Part of the Hundred Days
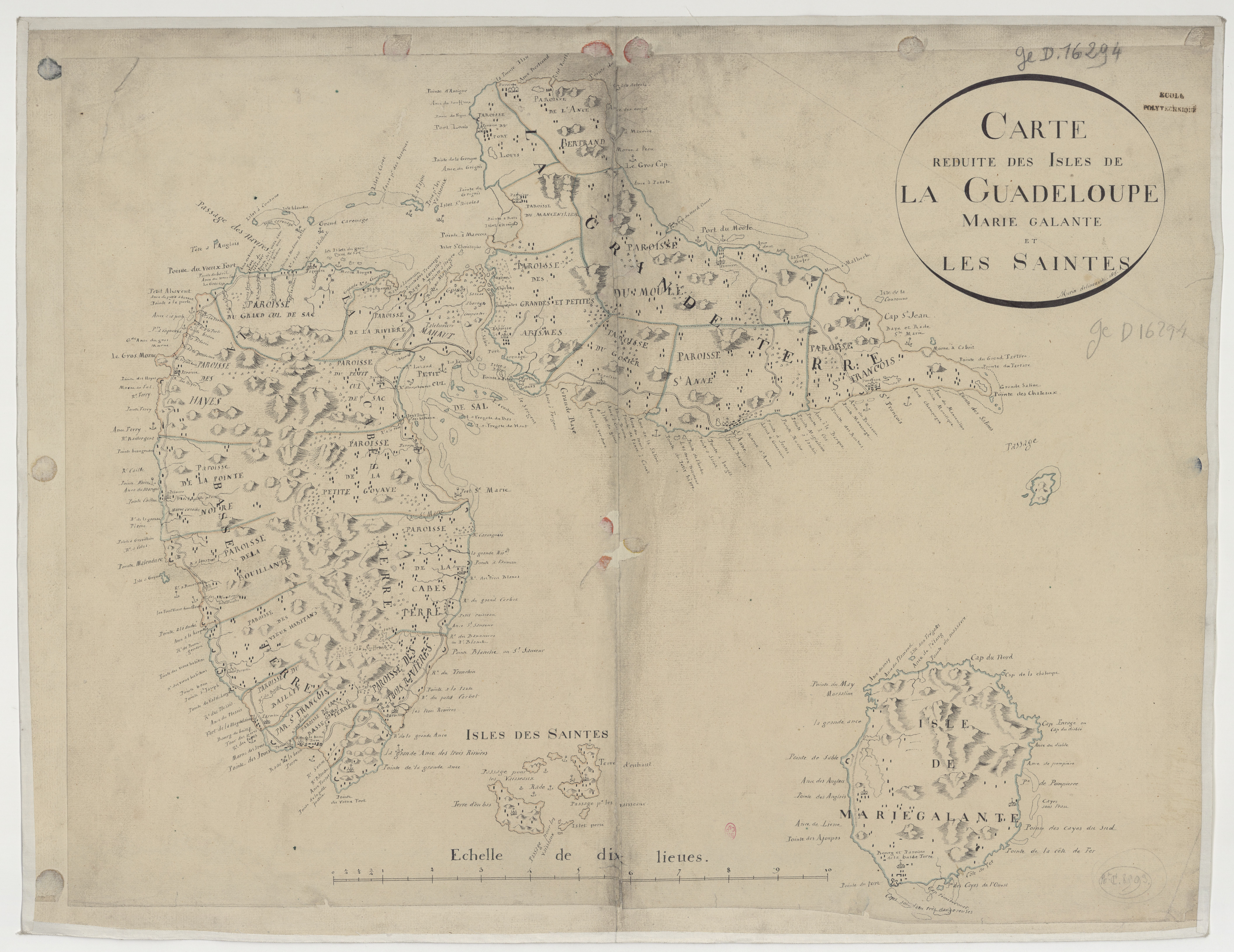
- 1815 map of Guadeloupe
Date	8–10 August 1815
Location	Guadeloupe, French West Indies
Result	Anglo-Bourbon victory

Belligerents
United Kingdom; Bourbon France	Napoleonic France

Commanders and leaders
James Leith; Thomas Moody	Charles-Alexandre Léon Durand Linois (surrendered)

Strength
5,000+ 7 brig-sloops 2 corvettes 1 schooner 53 troopships	~6,000

Casualties and losses
29 killed 77 wounded 4 missing	Unknown

The invasion of Guadeloupe occurred between 8 and 10 August 1815 during the Hundred Days. Following Napoleon's return to power, a conflict began in the French West Indian colony of Guadeloupe over whether or not to support him, which ended on 19 June when Governor Charles-Alexandre Linois declared his support for Napoleon. A British expeditionary force under Lieutenant-general Sir James Leith, augmented by French forces from Martinique, proceeded to set sail for Guadeloupe. Following failed negotiations with Linois, British troops landed on Basse-Terre Island on 8 August and routed defending French troops. After more British troops landed the next day, Linois capitulated on 10 August, with the British occupying the colony until April 1816. The invasion was the final conflict of the French Revolutionary and Napoleonic Wars.

== Background ==
During the French Revolutionary and Napoleonic Wars, British forces captured the French colony of Guadeloupe in 1794 and again in 1810. Britain briefly ceded the colony to Sweden in 1813 before it was returned to France under the terms of the 1814 Treaty of Paris. The newly crowned Louis XVIII appointed Counter-admiral Charles-Alexandre Léon Durand Linois as the new governor of Guadeloupe, with Brigade-general Eugène Édouard Boyer de Peyreleau serving as Linois' deputy. News of Napoleon's return to power reached the colony in May 1815, dividing its inhabitants' loyalties. Linois remained loyal to the King, while de Peyreleau supported Napoleon.

On 15 June the French schooner Argile arrived from France with orders for Linois to rally Guadeloupe and the nearby French colony of Martinique to Napoleon's cause. De Peyreleau attempted to persuade Linois to declare his loyalty to Napoleon but was rebuffed. On 18 June de Peyreleau began arresting leading officials in the colonial administration and held Linois under house arrest; a day later the governor reluctantly declared his support for Napoleon. Unbeknownst to them Napoleon had been defeated at Waterloo on 18 June and abdicated again four days later. In the meantime the governor of Martinique Pierre de Vaugiraud requested Britain's assistance in securing the colony's loyalty to Louis XVIII, with British troops landing there on 5 July.

== Invasion ==
Once he had learnt of the situation in Guadeloupe, British Lieutenant-general Sir James Leith, the Commander-in-Chief, Leeward Islands and a Peninsular War veteran, assembled an expeditionary force to invade the island. The expeditionary force comprised 5,000 infantrymen organised into three brigades commanded by the major generals Sir Charles Shipley, Edward Charles Stehelin and Robert Douglass. The 1st Brigade under Shipley comprised the 1/15th Foot, 6th West India Regiment and Royal West India Rangers, while the 2nd Brigade under Stehelin comprised the 1/25th Foot, 1st West India Regiment and Royal York Rangers and the 3rd Brigade under Douglass comprised the 63rd Foot, 3rd West India Regiment and York Chasseurs. Also present was an artillery corps consisting of four Royal Artillery companies.

To transport the invasion force to Guadeloupe, 53 troopships were assembled. These were to be escorted by a Royal Navy contingent under Rear-admiral Sir Philip Charles Durham, consisting of the brig-sloops HMS Dasher, HMS Fairy, HMS Espiegle, HMS Columbia, HMS Muros, HMS Barbadoes and HMS Chanticleer. Vaugiraud sent a small French Navy squadron consisting of the corvettes Actéon and Diligent and the schooner Le Messager along with a contingent of French troops from Martinique. Accompanied by his aide-de-camp Thomas Moody, Leith set out with the rest of his expedition for Guadeloupe. British forces occupied the Îles des Saintes on 6 July and Marie-Galante twelve days later.

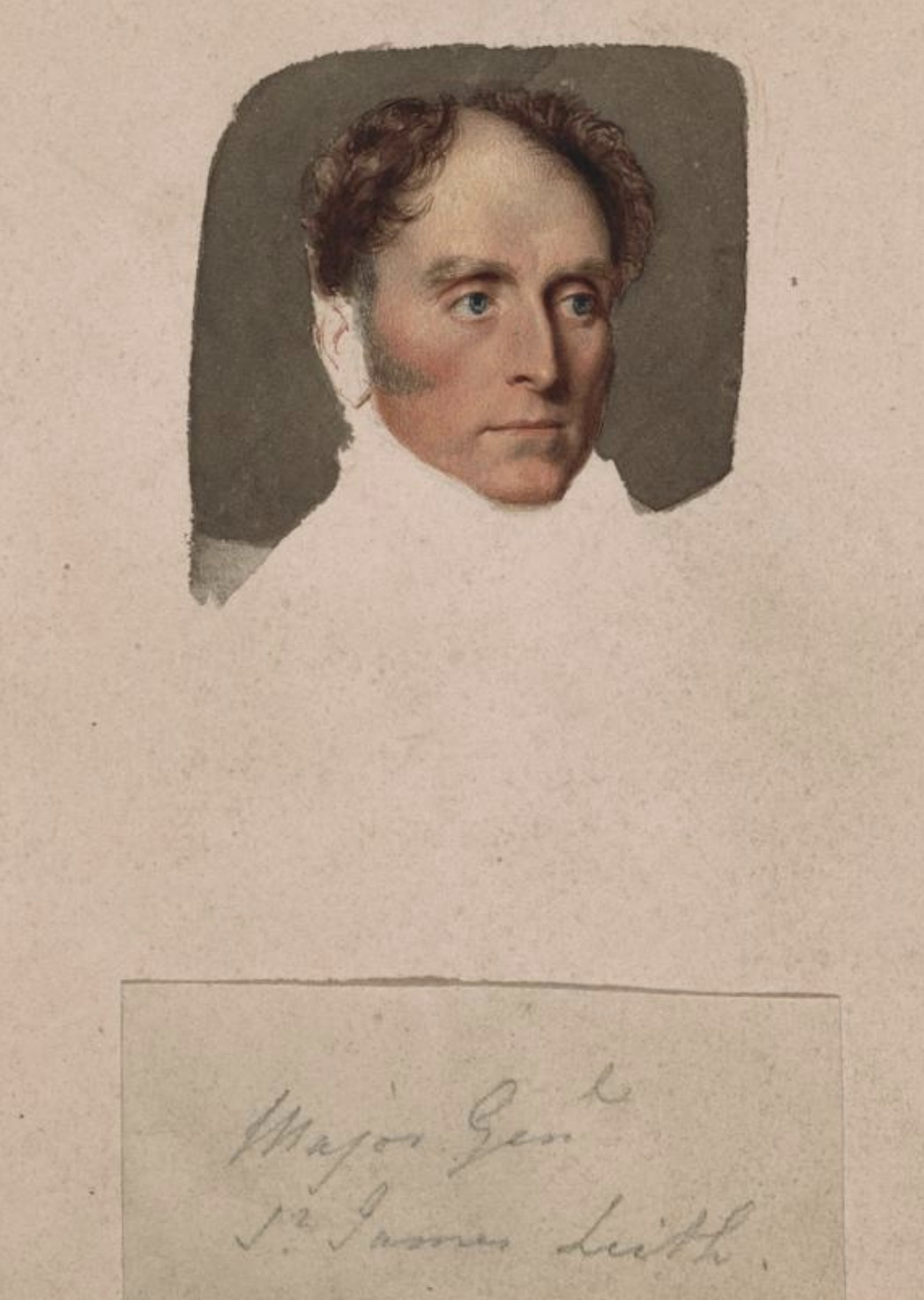
James Leith, who commanded the invasion force

The 1st Brigade, whose troops were drawn from the Windward Islands and the Guianas, set sail from Carlisle Bay, Barbados on 31 July and met the 2nd Brigade, whose troops were from Saint Lucia, Martinique and Dominica, off the Îles des Saintes. On 2 August, the ships transporting the 1st Brigade anchored in the bay of Saint-Louis in Marie-Galante, which allowed the brigade to threaten Basse-Terre. Rumours of Napoleon's defeat and abdication had reached Guadeloupe in July, but were dismissed as British propaganda by Linois and Boyer-Peyreleau. On 3 August, Captain Andrew Leith Hay, Leith's nephew and another aide-de-camp of his, arrived at Basse-Terre under a flag of truce with a proclamation detailing Napoleon's abdication. Hay demanded the French garrison lay down their arms, which was refused, although on 7 August French newspapers arrived in the colony from Barbados and Martinique which confirmed what had happened in Europe.

At the time of the invasion, the French garrison on Guadeloupe consisted of 6,000 regulars and militia. The regular troops consisted of an overseas service battalion of the 62nd Line Infantry Regiment under de Peyreleau's command that had arrived in the colony in January 1815, and a company of the 6th Foot Artillery Regiment under a Captain de La Fontaine. On 8 August, the 1st and 2nd Brigades landed at Anse Saint-Sauveur on the southeastern coast of Basse-Terre Island and drove defending French troops into the hills. The 3rd Brigade landed at Baillif on the southwestern coast of the island on 9 August, preventing the scattered French garrison from regrouping. Later in the day Linois sent word to the British invaders, requesting they name their conditions for a surrender. On 10 August, he signed a capitulation with the British.

== Aftermath ==
The invasion was the final engagement of the Hundred Days and more broadly speaking the French Revolutionary and Napoleonic Wars. The British suffered 29 killed, 77 wounded and four missing, while French casualties are unknown. Under terms Linois signed in the capitulation, Guadeloupe was placed under British occupation, which lasted until the colony was handed over to French colonial authorities in April 1816. On 20 November 1816 Louis XVIII awarded Leith the Grand Cordon of the Order of Military Merit, with Moody being made a Knight of the Order of Military Merit. However, Leith had already died by the time he was awarded by Louis XVIII, having contracted yellow fever in Barbados on 10 October and dying six days later. Leith's body was returned to England, and was buried in the nave of Westminster Abbey on 15 March 1817. Upon his return to France, Linois was forced to resign and court martialled, but was acquitted on 11 March 1816, though never holding an active command again.
