= USS Columbia =

USS Columbia may refer to:

- USS Columbia (1813), a Java-class frigate under construction, was burned in 1814 to prevent her capture by the British
- USS Columbia (1836) was a 50-gun sailing frigate launched in 1836 and in occasional service until 1861, when she was burned to avoid capture by the Confederates
- USS Columbia (1862) was a captured Confederate screw steamer that ran aground in 1863
- USS Columbia (1864) was an ironclad, also captured from the Confederates in 1865 and in use until June of that year.
- USS Columbia (C-12), later CA-16, was a protected cruiser in service from 1894 to 1921. At the end of its career it was renamed USS Old Columbia.
- USS Columbia (AG-9) was originally the Great Northern, a troop transport, renamed in 1921 and used until 1922
- USS Columbia (CL-56) was a light cruiser launched 17 December 1941 and active throughout the rest of World War II
- USS Columbia (AOT-182), a transport oiler, was returned to her owner on 1 May 1984
- USS Columbia (SSN-771) is a Los Angeles-class submarine commissioned in 1995 and currently in active service

== See also ==
- USS District of Columbia (SSBN-826), future lead ship of the Columbia-class submarines, originally named Columbia, but changed so as not to conflict with USS Columbia (SSN-771)
- List of ships named SS Columbia
- Columbia Rediviva (1773) - privately owned American full-rigged ship
- The Command Module Columbia of Apollo 11
- Space Shuttle Columbia
- HMCS Columbia - several Canadian Navy ships
- HMS Columbia (1812) -a United States privateer brig formally named Curlew captured by the Royal Navy
