= HMS Columbia (1812) =

US privateer and Royal Navy brig (1812–1820

History

United States
- Commissioned: 16 July 1812
- Captured: 24 July 1812

United Kingdom
- Acquired: 1812 by purchase of a prize
- Fate: Sold 1820

General characteristics
- Tons burthen: 278, or 29412/94 (bm)
- Length: Overall:94 ft 4 in (28.8 m); Keel:80 ft 3 in (24.5 m)
- Beam: 26 ft 3 in (8.0 m)
- Depth of hold: 13 ft 0 in (4.0 m)
- Complement: Privateer: 154; At capture: 172
- Armament: Privateer: 16 guns; RN: 16 × 18-pounder carronades + 2 × 6-pounder chase guns

HMS Columbia was the United States privateer brig Curlew, which the British Royal Navy captured in 1812 and took into service as HMS Columbia. The Navy sold her in 1820.

== Capture ==
On 24 July 1812 HMS Acasta captured the privateer Curlew 44°15′N 62°30′W. Curlew, of 240 tons, was pierced for 18 guns but carried only sixteen, and had a complement of 172 men; (Note: A first-class share of some gunpowder and other stores aboard her was worth £11 5s 0¼d; a sixth-class share was worth 2s.) She was under the command of Captain William Wyer.

Curlew arrived at Halifax, Nova Scotia at the end of July.

== Royal Navy ==
The Royal Navy took Curlew into service as HMS Columbia. In March 1813 she was under the command of Lieutenant John Kinsman. On 28 May Commander Henry Chads replaced Kinsman. Columbia then brought home a number of invalids from Halifax.

Columbia underwent fitting at Portsmouth between 19 November 1813 and 18 April 1814. She then sailed for the Leeward Islands.

On 4 December 1814 Columbia captured the United States schooner Dolphin, of 62 tons, one gun, and 20 men. Dolphin, under the command of Captain A. Johnson, of Massachusetts, apparently had accomplished little.

Columbia participated in the Invasion of Guadeloupe (1815). On 8 August 1815 Columbia, under the command of Captain Fleming, was part of the British force that captured Guadeloupe from Bonaparte loyalists. French Royalist troops from Martinique, two corvettes, and a schooner assisted the British. Columbia, Fairy, and Barbadoes covered the landing of the troops; they helped silence a shore battery and drive the defenders back from the beach. Columbia, Chanticleer, and Muros then supported a third landing on a different part of the island. (Note: In an allocation of bounty money in March 1823, a first-class share was worth £30 10s 6½d; a sixth-class share was worth 11s 7½d.)

== Fate ==
Columbia was paid off and went into Ordinary in November 1815. The Navy sold her there on 13 January 1820.
