= HMS Barbadoes (1813) =

Sloop of the Royal Navy

History

United Kingdom
- Name: HMS Barbadoes
- Namesake: Barbados
- Acquired: 1813 by purchase of a prize
- Commissioned: March 1813
- Fate: Hulk; wrecked post 1816

General characteristics
- Tons burthen: 30788/94 (bm)
- Length: Overall:102 ft 0 in (31.1 m); Keel:64 ft 6 5/8 in (19.7 m)
- Beam: 26 ft 2 in (8.0 m)
- Depth of hold: 13 ft 0 in (4.0 m)

HMS Barbadoes was a 16-gun vessel, the American Herald, captured in 1813. The Royal Navy took her into service as HMS Barbadoes She captured a number of merchantmen and privateers before she was paid-off in May 1816. In 1814–1815 she also captured three Spanish and French slave ships carrying over 1100 enslaved people. Barbadoes became a powder ship in Jamaica that was later wrecked with her remains being sold.

== American letter of marque ==
On 10 December 1812 HMS Acasta, Poictiers, and Maidstone captured the letter of marque brig Herald, bound from Bordeaux to Baltimore. The British took Herald into service as the sloop-of-war HMS Barbadoes. (Note: American sources report that Herald was armed with 10 guns and had a crew of 50 men)

== HMS ==
In March 1813 Lieutenant John Fleming commissioned Barbadoes in the Leeward Islands.

On 31 January 1814 Barbados captured the Swedish ship Gothland, and sent her into Antigua.Gothland was carrying corn and shingles.

On 11 April 1814 Fleming reported from English Harbour that Barbadoes had captured the American privateer sloop Polly off San Domingo after a 60–hour chase. Polly was armed with one 18-pounder gun amidships, and four 6-pounder guns. She had a crew of 57 men. (Note: American records state that Polly, of 91 tons (bm), was a sloop from Salem, Massachusetts, and under the command of Robert Evans. She was on her sixth cruise (her fourth under Captain Evans), had been commissioned for this cruise on 11 March 1814, and had captured nothing. On her first cruise in 1812 she had captured 19 British vessels, six of which had reached American ports. On her sixth cruise she had not taken anything before Barbadoes captured her.)

In July Barbadoes captured and sent into Tortola the Spanish ship Venus. Venus was carrying "400 Negroes" from Africa to Havana. A later notice of bounty money for the captives records the name of the ship as Venus Havannera. (Note: The preeminent database of the Trans-Atlantic Slave Trade shows a captured Spanish/Uruguayan Venus that landed 303 captives at Tortola on 14 August. The only voyage by a Venus Habanera occurred in 1812.)

On 9 September 1814 Barbadoes picked up a schooner of unknown name, at sea. Then on 6 October Barbadoes captured the schooner Commodore Decatur, of 67 tons and 7 men.

On 2 November Fleming was promoted to the rank of Commander.

On 26 December HMS Barrosa and Barbadoes captured the schooner Gallant Hull, of 10 men and 79 tons (bm).

On 11 January 1815 Barbadoes took the privateer schooner Fox, of 7 guns and 72 men. She was 12 days out of Wilmington and had taken no prizes. (Note: American records state that Fox was a schooner of 146 tons (bm), out of Wilmington North Carolina. She had been commissioned 14 November 1812. She was armed with eight guns, and had a crew of 19 men under the command of Captain Hyacinth Morgan.) Barbadoescarried Fox into Barbados on the 1t4h.

On 5 February Barbadoes captured the schooner James Lawrence, of 175 tons (bm), and 16 men.

On 15 February HMS Dasher and Barbadoes captured the schooner Spencer, of 160 tons (bm), and 16 men.

The next day Barbadoes took the American letter of marque brigantine Vidette off St. Bartholomew. She was armed with three guns and carried 30 men. (Note: American records state that Vidette was a brigantine of 261 tons (bm), out of Baltimore. She had been commissioned on 15 February 1815. She was armed with five guns and had a crew of 30 men under the command of Captain William Wade.)

On 28 February Barbadoes captured the schooner Nelson, of 76 tons (bm), and five men.

The following month, on 8 March, Barbadoes captured the American privateer brig Avon after a short action. Avon was pierced for 22 guns but mounted three 24-pounder and eleven 9-pounder guns; she carried a crew of 129 men. Barbadoes had four wounded; ten men were killed and wounded in the privateer. (Note: American sources state that Avon was a brig of 388 tons (bm), out of Boston. She had been commissioned on 13 January 1815. She was armed with 14 guns and a crew of 130 men under the command of Captain George Taylor. She had taken two prizes, one of which had reached an American port.) (Note: Head money for 88 men was paid in 1816. A first-class share was worth £95 15s; a sixth-class share, that of an ordinary seaman, was worth £1 6s 5 1/2d.) Avon arrived at Barbados on 14 March. Lloyd's List reported that Barbadoes had had one man killed and five wounded; Avon had had one man killed and five wounded. American sources reported that Avon had one man killed and four wounded, and that Barbados had one man killed and three wounded. Twenty-two of Avon's men were aboard a small sloop that Avon had detached to seek prizes at St Kitts. The British captured the sloop the next day.

Barbadoes was reported at some point in April or early May to have detained three Bourbon (French Royalist) vessels bound from Martinique to Guadeloupe.

Barbadoes, Dasher, and Fairy captured two French vessels, Belle Victoire, on 22 July, and Somnambule on 27 July. Also on 25 July, Barbadoes detained Junge Clara. (Note: A first-class share of the prize money was worth £788 6s 8d; a sixth-class share, that of an ordinary seaman, was worth £17 6s 6d.)

On 28 July Barbadoes detained Hermione and Belle de Bordeaux. The Vice Admiralty Court restored them to their owners. Still Barbadoes received a second payment of prize money for Junge Clara from funds that had been withheld to cover the costs for the restitution. (Note: A first-class share of the prize money was worth £237 1s 1d; a sixth-class share was worth £5 7s 4 3/4d.)

Barbadoes's last military action was her participation in the Invasion of Guadeloupe (1815). On 8 August 1815 Barbadoes, under the command of Captain Fleming, was part of the British force that captured Guadeloupe from Bonaparte loyalists. French Royalist troops from Martinique, two corvettes, and a schooner assisted the British. Barbadoes and several other warships covered the landing of the troops; they helped silence a shore battery and drive the defenders back from the beach. (Note: In an allocation of bounty money in March 1823, a first-class share was worth £30 10s 6 1/2d; a sixth-class share was worth 11s 7 1/2d.)

On 8 August Barbadoes brought into Antigua a French Guineaman. The slave ship had been bound to Guadeloupe with 515 captives on board. This may have been the brig Virginie, which Barbadoes had captured on 15 July.

On 2 October Barbadoes and Chanticleer brought a French brig into Antigua. The brig was carrying 208 captives from Africa and some ivory tusks.

== Fate ==
Barbadoes was paid off in May 1816. She became a powder hulk in Jamaica. She was later wrecked and her remains sold.
