= Columbia (1897 paddle steamer) =

Paddle steamer excursion boat sunk in 1918

Coordinates: 40°34′16″N 89°39′09″W

Columbia's last voyage
- Date: July 5–6, 1918
- Duration: 3:50:00
- Cause: Fog
- Outcome: Collapsed
- Deaths: 87

Columbia, sometimes called the Steamer Columbia, was a paddle steamer excursion boat on which 87 people died, on the Illinois River on July 5, 1918, across from Creve Coeur, between Peoria and Pekin, Illinois.

== Pre-disaster ==
History
- Name: Columbia
- Owner: Herman F. Mehl Excursion Company
- Operator: Herman F. Mehl
- Builder: Howard Ship Company
- Fate: Collapsed

The Columbia was built at Clinton, Iowa in 1897. Originally a packet boat, it was converted to an excursion boat in 1905.

In 1912, a well-respected captain, Herman F. Mehl of Peoria, formed the Herman F. Mehl Excursion Company, and bought the Columbia from Captain Walter Blair of Davenport, Iowa. In autumn 1917, the ship was rebuilt at the Howard Ship Company's Mound City yards, in time for the 1918 excursion season. Mehl spent almost $18,000 on renovations to meet safety standards, after which the federal inspectors called the Columbia "the safest boat on western waters".

== Last voyage ==
The Columbia excursion of July 5, 1918 was hosted by Pekin's South Side Social Club. The club sold 563 tickets at the price of 50 cents, or 25 cents for children. One hundred of the passengers were picked up at Kingston Mines, the boat leaving at 7:30 p.m.; the rest were picked up in Pekin. The boat left Pekin at 8:15 p.m.

The Columbia docked at Al Fresco Park along the river in Richwoods Township (and now Peoria Heights) for 30 minutes, then returned downstream.

Just after passing under the Peoria and Pekin Union Railway bridge, just upstream from Wesley City (now Creve Coeur), the boat encountered dense fog, which a passenger described as "like going from sunshine into darkness". The pilot lost control of the vessel, which then drifted towards the Peoria County, Illinois side of the river.

Captain Mehl told pilot Tom Williams to make for the shore, unaware of a large hole torn in the ship's side by a submerged log. Williams attempted to cross from the overgrown Peoria County side to the Tazewell County side, where there were populated shacks and a possible landing. However, the ship's decks quickly collapsed on top of each other. It was determined that the boat sank at 12:05 a.m. on July 6. This was ascertained by the recovery of victim's watches that had stopped at that moment.

== Aftermath ==
The same inspectors who had declared the boat safe were the ones who conducted the federal investigation. Mehl and Williams both lost their licenses. The coroner implicated Mehl, Williams, and the purser of the Columbia, but the case never went to trial.

The disaster ended the bulk of the riverboat excursion business on the Illinois River.

== Legacy ==
In July 1992, a memorial park to the disaster was dedicated in Creve Coeur by the Wesley City Historical Society. An additional historical marker, serving as a memorial to the tragedy, was dedicated in Pekin by the Tazewell County Historical Places Society and the Illinois State Historical Society on July 5, 2003.
