= HMS Chanticleer (1808) =

Napoleonic War-era brig of the Royal Navy

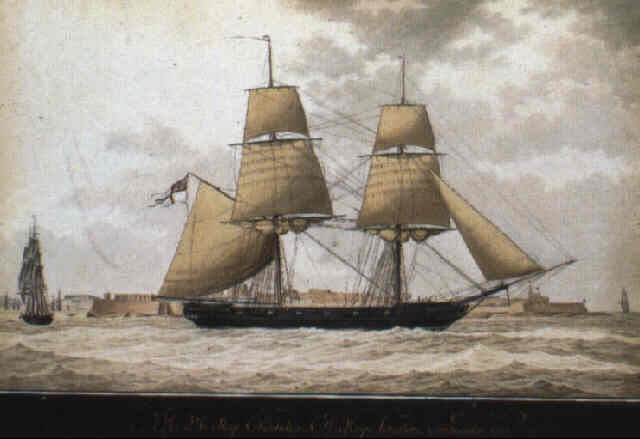
- Chanticleer off Valetta, Malta, by Nicolas Cammillieri

History

United Kingdom
- Name: HMS Chanticleer
- Ordered: 31 December 1807
- Builder: Daniel List, East Cowes
- Laid down: March 1808
- Launched: 26 July 1808
- Completed: 5 October 1808
- Commissioned: September 1808
- Decommissioned: 1848, transferred to Coastguard
- Fate: Sold and broken up in June 1871 at Sheerness

General characteristics
- Class & type: Cherokee-class brig-sloop
- Tons burthen: 237 bm
- Length: 90 ft 3 in (27.5 m) (gundeck); 70 ft 0 1/2 in (21.3 m) (gundeck)
- Beam: 24 ft 7 in (7.5 m)
- Draught: 9 ft 0 in (2.7 m) (laden); 6 ft 0 in (1.8 m) (unladen)
- Depth of hold: 11 ft (3.4 m)
- Sail plan: Brig
- Complement: 75 as a ship-of-war
- Armament: 8 × 18-pounder carronades + 2 × 6-pounder guns

HMS Chanticleer was a Cherokee-class 10-gun brig of the Royal Navy. Chanticleer was launched on 26 July 1808. She served in European waters (mainly the North Sea) in the Napoleonic Wars and was paid off and laid up at Sheerness in July 1816. She was chosen for an 1828 scientific voyage to the Pacific Ocean. Her poor condition on her return meant that the Admiralty replaced her for the second voyage in 1831 with another Cherokee-class brig, Beagle, which subsequently became famous because of the association with Charles Darwin. Chanticleer then spent 15 years as a customs watch ship at Burnham-on-Crouch and was broken up in 1871.

== War service ==
Her initial base was Great Yarmouth. She was commissioned in September 1808 under Commander Charles Harford, but he drowned in an accident on 19 October, so Commander Richard Spear took command in November 1808. On 27 July 1809, Chanticleer captured the Russian lugger Emperor. Then on 24 October, Sheldrake captured the Jupiter. Leverett and Chanticleer shared in the prize money by agreement.

On 2 September 1811 while off the coast of Norway, Chanticleer became involved in an action with three 18-gun brigs of the Royal Danish Navy, Lolland, Alsen, and Samsøe. Outgunned and outnumbered, Chanticleer made good her escape, leaving her consort, Manly, for the Danes to capture.

On 28 August 1810, Chanticleer captured the Dutch fishing boat Hoop. Chanticleer was under the command of John G. M'Bride M'Killop (Acting Commander) when she took possession of the derelict vessel Haabet on 16 November 1811. (Note: A first-class share of the salvage money was worth £253 6s 4d; a sixth-class share, that of an ordinary seaman, was worth £5 6s 3¼d. On a subsequent payment, a first-class share was worth £99 18s 1d; a sixth-class share was worth £2 1s 10¾d.)

Chanticleer was in company with Parthian when they captured the Jobb on 2 January 1812. Then on 9 April 1812, Chanticleer captured the Danish vessel Christine. On 23 October 1812, Chanticleer, Clio and Oberon captured the Jonge Henrick.

Chanticleer served chiefly as an escort vessel and cruised off the European coast. Commander Stewart Blacker assumed command in May 1813. In 1813, she took three prizes near the German archipelago of Heligoland in the North Sea. Commander J. Thomson replace Blacker in July 1814.

In August 1815 Chanticleer, under the command of Lieutenant George Tupman (Acting), was part of the British force that captured Guadeloupe. (Note: For more on George Tupman see: O'Byrne, William R. (1849). "Tupman, George" . A Naval Biographical Dictionary. London: John Murray.) She swept one beach of the few French troops that made an appearance; she then provided cover at another beach. (Note: In an allocation of bounty money in March 1823, a first-class share was worth £30 10s 6½d; a sixth-class share was worth 11s 7½d. As a lieutenant, Tupman would probably have qualified for a second-class share, worth £6 12s 3½d.) On 2 October 1815 Chanticlear and Barbadoes brought a French brig into Antigua. The brig was carrying 208 slaves from Africa and some ivory tusks.

== Post-war service ==
Chanticleer was at Chatham in 1817. On 23 October 1821 Captain Henry Eden took command. He sailed her to the Mediterranean, where he was "very efficiently occupied during the revolution in Greece." Commander Burton Macnamara replaced him in July 1822. Two months later Chanticleer was dispatched to Fanari, Preveza, to supervise evacuation of the Souliotes.

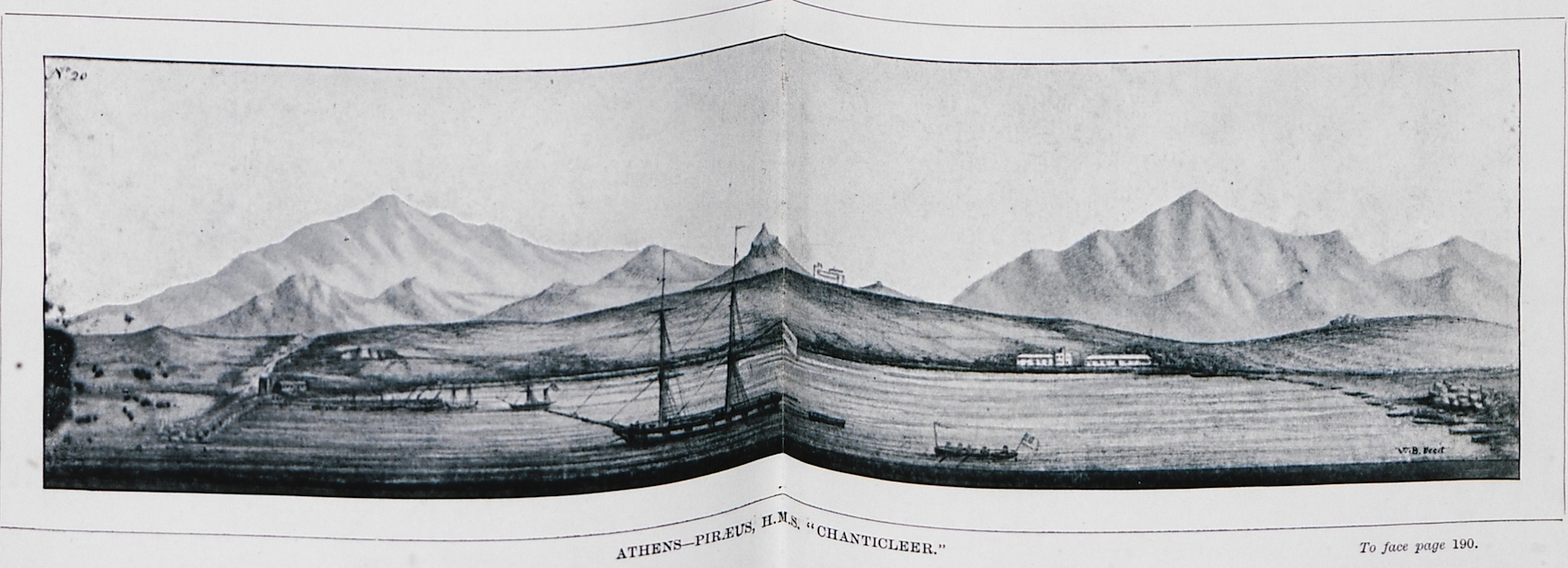
Chanticleer at Piraeus port

Charles James Hope Johnstone took command in September 1824, still in the Mediterranean. He was posted in December 1826 and command devolved to an acting commander until April 1827, when Commander John Balfour Maxwell took command.

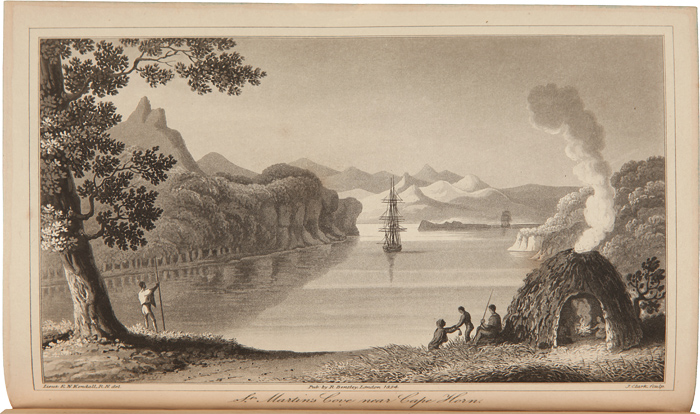
St. Martin's Cove near Cape Horn

Chanticleer was dispatched on a scientific expedition in the Pacific Ocean in 1828 under the command of Captain Henry Foster, who had taken command in December 1827. He explored the South Atlantic, and especially the South Shetland Islands; Port Foster on Deception Island, which is the caldera of an extinct volcano, is named after him. On the expedition, the ship visited the River Plate and Staten Island of Argentina, Cape Horn of Chile at the southernmost tip of South America, New Zealand, South Georgia, and rounded the Cape of Good Hope. From there she sailed back to South America via Saint Helena, Ascension Island and Fernando de Noronha. Chanticleer reached the South American coast at Saint Louis, Maranham. (Note: In 1823 the British sailor and liberator Admiral Lord Cochrane had driven out the Portuguese and it became part of the Empire of Brazil. For this achievement Lord Cochrane became 1st Marques of Maranhão and governor of the province of Maranhão.) From there she sailed up the Amazon river to Pará. Chanticleer next arrived at Port of Spain, Trinidad, sailing from there to La Guaira and on to Portobelo, Colón. Foster sent his first lieutenant, Horatio Thomas Austin across the Isthmus of Darien. After Austin returned, Foster set out to conduct some more scientific tests in the same area. Unfortunately, after he had completed his experiments and was on his way back to his ship, Foster fell out of his canoe in the Chagres River and drowned. (Note: Foster had apparently set out on his trip in good spirits, but whether due to precaution, premonition, or plan, he had given his keys to a Mr. Webster, whom he instructed to pay his debts, and had bequeathed various articles to his friends.) After Foster's death, the ship's command fell to Austin. He sailed Chanticleer across the Atlantic Ocean to Falmouth in 1831.

Chanticleer had originally been scheduled to make the second South America survey of 1831, but due to her poor condition after her three-year voyage, the Admiralty sent Beagle instead. (Note: "H.M.S. Chanticleer (one of the six survey ships built in 1817) was scheduled for the second South America survey, but because she was in such poor condition the Beagle was selected instead.") Thus it was Beagle, and not Chanticleer, that became the ship upon which Charles Darwin established his reputation as a naturalist.

Instead of sending Chanticleer to South America, the Navy lent her to the Royal Sailing Society, Thames. That assignment lasted from 1831 to 1832.

In 1832, Dr John Frost obtained an Admiralty grant to establish Chanticleer as a hospital ship to be moored off Millbank to serve as a refuge for Thames boatmen. However, Frost overextended himself and the plan fell through.

== Fate ==
In 1845, Chanticleer was towed to Burnham-on-Crouch in Essex, for use in the River Crouch as a Customs watch ship. She was re-named WV5 (Watch Vessel 5) on 25 May 1863 and served in that capacity until 1870. (Note: A watch vessel was a vessel carrying lights and a bell, and anchored to mark the position of a hazard to navigation such as a wreck.) She was broken up in June 1871 at Sheerness.
