= Order of Military Merit (France) =

France

Order of Military Merit Ordre du Mérite Militaire
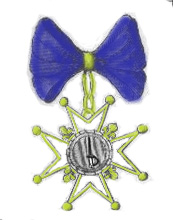
- Knight's Cross of the Order

Awarded by the (Kingdom of France) King of France
- Type: Meritorious award
- Established: 10 March 1759
- Country: France
- Royal house: House of France
- Motto: Latin: Pro virtute bellica
- Eligibility: Non-Catholic military officers
- Awarded for: Military merit
- Status: Temporarily abolished in 1830 by the July Revolution of France
- Founder: Louis XV

Precedence
- Next (higher): Order of Saint Michael
- Equivalent: Order of Saint Louis; Awarded to Catholics

The Order of Military Merit, which was initially known as the Institution of Military Merit (French: Institution du Mérite militaire), was a French military order that was created on 10 March 1759 by King Louis XV for non-Catholic military officers who had assisted the French state.

== History ==
There were by the 18th Century regiments of Swedish, German, and Swiss troops in service to France, the most famous of which were the Swiss Guards. Since many of these regiments' officers were Protestant, they were ineligible for conferral with Roman Catholic orders of chivalry such as the Order of Saint Louis. King Louis XV initially created the Institution du Mérite militaire as an award, but not as an order, because French orders were exclusive Catholics. The three classes of the Institution du Mérite militaire, which were decreed in 1785, were Knight, Commander or Gran Cordon and Grand Cross, the latter limited to four and two receivers, respectively. King Louis was careful to promote the prestige of the award by appointing the most talented officers. One of the first Grand Crosses was received by William Henry, Prince of Nassau-Saarbrücken. In 1791, during the French Revolution, the Order of Military Merit was incorporated into the Order of St. Louis to create a single Décoration Militaire, to which King Louis XVIII made appointments until he on 28 November 1814 reinstituted the Order of Military Merit, and increased the number of available Grand Crosses to four and the number of available Grand Cordons to eight, and changed the colour of their sash to that of the Order of St. Louis.

== Decoration ==

1. Knight
2. Commander
3. Grand Cross

Medal and insignia
Knight	Commander	Grand Cross

== Notable recipients ==
- Henrik Georg Aminoff (1718–1787), Swedish major general
- Admiral Sir Philip Charles Henderson Calderwood Durham (1763-1845)
- John Paul Jones
- Johann de Kalb
- Axel von Fersen
- Curt von Stedingk
- Władysław Grzegorz Branicki
- Charles-Daniel de Meuron
- Sir James Leith (Knight Grand Cordon)
- Thomas Moody (1779 - 1849) (Knight)
- Richard Clement Moody (Knight Grand Cross)
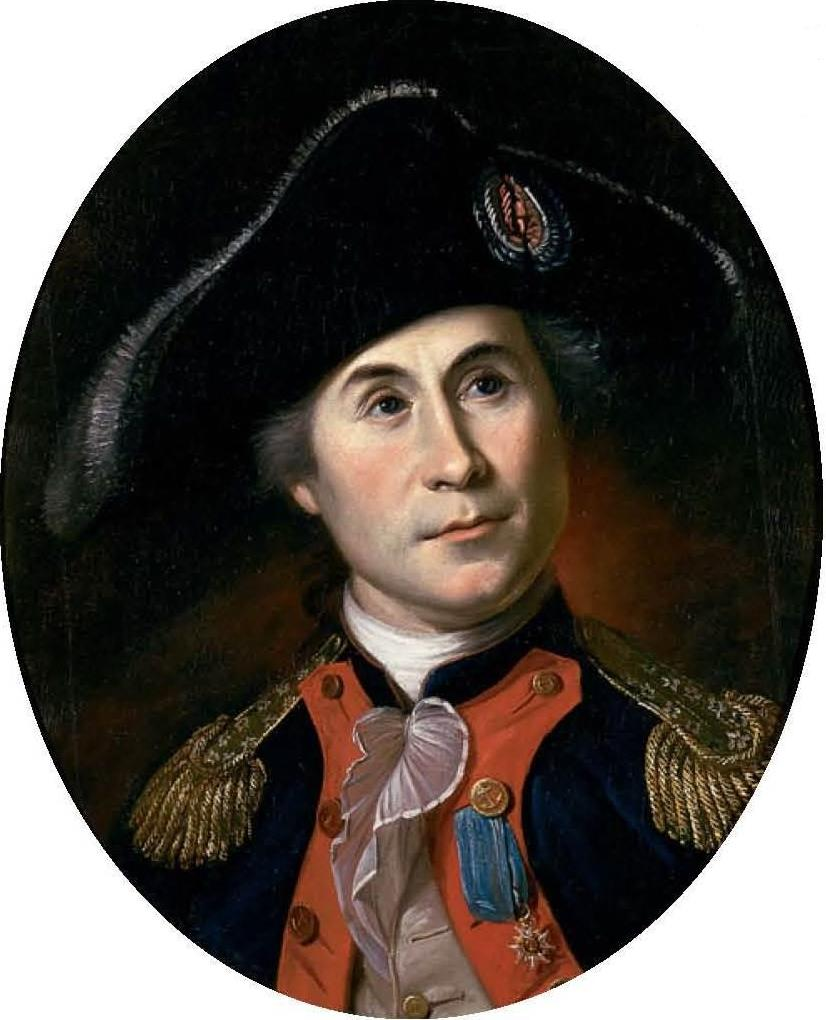
John Paul Jones wearing the Order of Military Merit (by Charles Willson Peale, c. 1781)

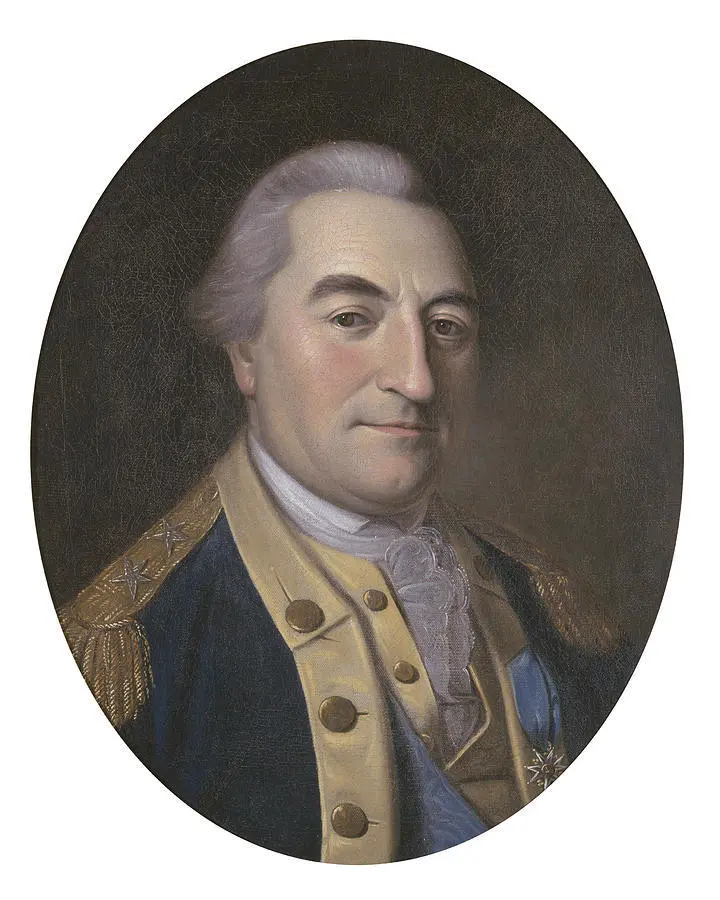
Johann de Kalb wearing the Order of Military Merit

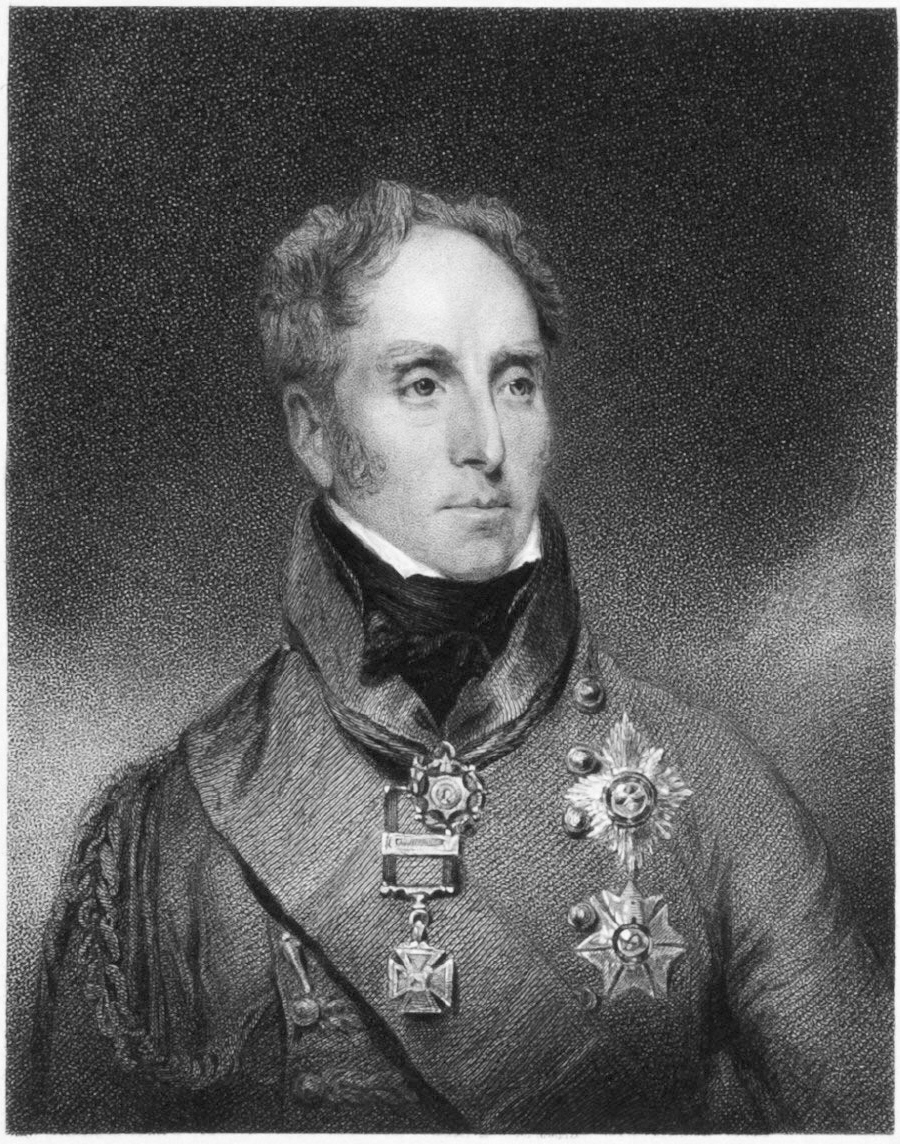
Sir James Leith
