= SS Columbia =

SS Columbia may refer to:

- SS Columbia (1840), a paddle steamer built by Robert Steele & Company and eventually wrecked
- SS Columbia (1862), an iron steamship built by Archibald Denny, Dumbarton
- SS Columbia (1866), a passenger/cargo vessel built by Alexander Stephen & Sons, Glasgow
- SS Columbia (1880), the first vessel to have electricity
- SS Columbia (1889), a German Hamburg America Line passenger ship purchased by Spain for use in the Spanish–American War as the auxiliary cruiser Spanish cruiser Rapido (1889), then returned to commercial service and later purchased by Russia for use in the Russo-Japanese War of 1904–1905 as the auxiliary cruiser Terek
- SS Columbia (1891), a steam trawler built by Mackie & Thomson Govan
- SS Columbia (1894), a British mail ship sold to France and sunk in World War I
- SS Columbia (1896), a Canadian screw-driven tugboat
- SS Columbia (1902 steamboat), an American excursion steamship
- SS Columbia (1902 ocean liner), a Scottish passenger/cargo vessel originally named HMS Columbella and subsequently named Moreas, scrapped in Venice 1929
- SS Columbia (1907), a passenger/cargo vessel built by New York Shipbuilding, Camden, NJ as Dorothy Alexander, then President then Columbia for Alaska Steamship Co; World War II WSA troop transport serving Alaska
- SS Columbia (1908), a passenger/cargo vessel built by Russell & Co Port Glasgow
- SS Columbia (1913), originally Katoomba, Australian liner & troop ship in WW I & II, renamed Columbia in 1949 for Greek Lines, scrapped 1959
- SS Columbia (1914), a British ocean liner renamed Belgic in 1917, then Belgenland again in 1923, before becoming the American ship Columbia in 1935, scrapped 1936
- SS Columbia (1920), a Canadian steam tugboat serving Lower Arrow Lake until 1948
- SS Columbia (1930), a Dutch passenger/cargo ship of the Koninklijke Nederlandse Stoomboot-Maatschappij, sunk by torpedo 1943
- SS Columbia (Tokyo DisneySea), a passenger ship at Tokyo DisneySea

== See also ==
- USS Columbia
