= HMCS Columbia =

Several Canadian naval units have been named HMCS Columbia.

- HMCS Columbia (I49) (I) was a Town-class destroyer that was originally commissioned as USS Haraden (DD-183) until transfer to the Royal Canadian Navy in 1940 by way of the Royal Navy.
- HMCS Columbia (DDE 260) (II) was a Restigouche-class destroyer that served in the RCN and Canadian Forces from 1959 to 1974.

== Battle honours ==
- Atlantic 1940–1944

== See also ==
- USS Columbia
