= CSS Columbia =

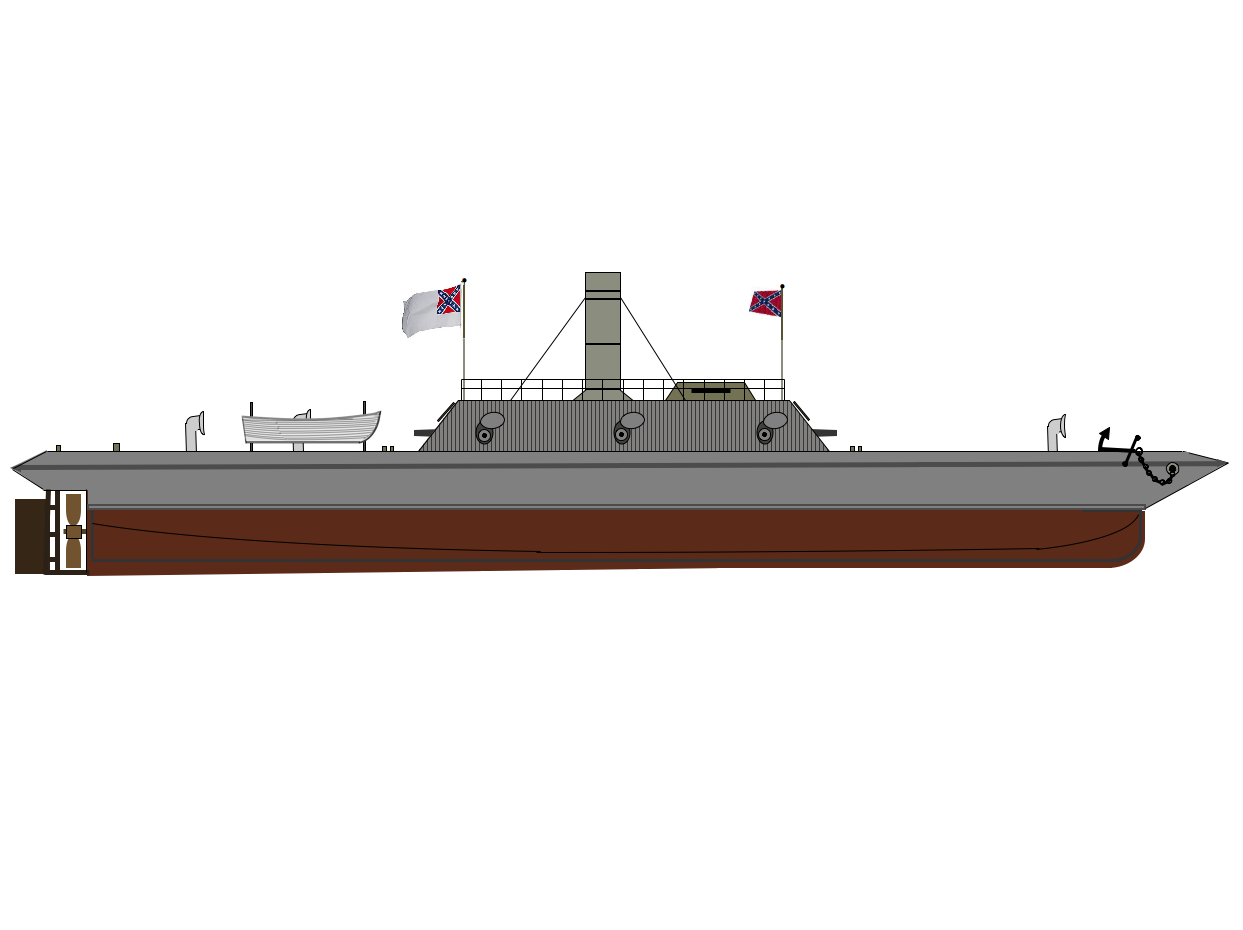
- CSS Columbia

History

Confederate States
- Name: Columbia
- Laid down: 1864
- Launched: March 1864
- Commissioned: 1864
- Decommissioned: 15 June 1865
- Fate: Captured by Union forces 18 February 1865; sold 10 October 1867

General characteristics
- Length: 216 ft (66 m)
- Beam: 51 ft 4 in (15.65 m)
- Draft: 13 ft 6 in (4.11 m)
- Propulsion: Steam engine
- Armament: 6 guns

CSS Columbia was an ironclad steamer ram in the Confederate States Navy and later in the United States Navy.

== As CSS Columbia ==
Columbia was built at Charleston, South Carolina in 1864 to a design by John L. Porter. She was launched in March 1864 and entered service later in that year. When the Union forces took possession of Charleston on 18 February 1865, they found Columbia near Fort Moultrie; she had run on a sunken wreck and been damaged on 12 January 1865. The ironclad already had her cannon and some armor plating removed; ship-worms were already at work boring into her wooden hull.

== As USS Columbia ==
She was raised on 26 April and was towed by USS Vanderbilt to Hampton Roads, Virginia, where she arrived on 25 May 1865. Columbia was drydocked on 5 June and repairs were begun, but on 15 June, she was decommissioned and placed in ordinary. Her hulk was later sold for scrapping on 10 October 1867.
