= Beryl (given name) =

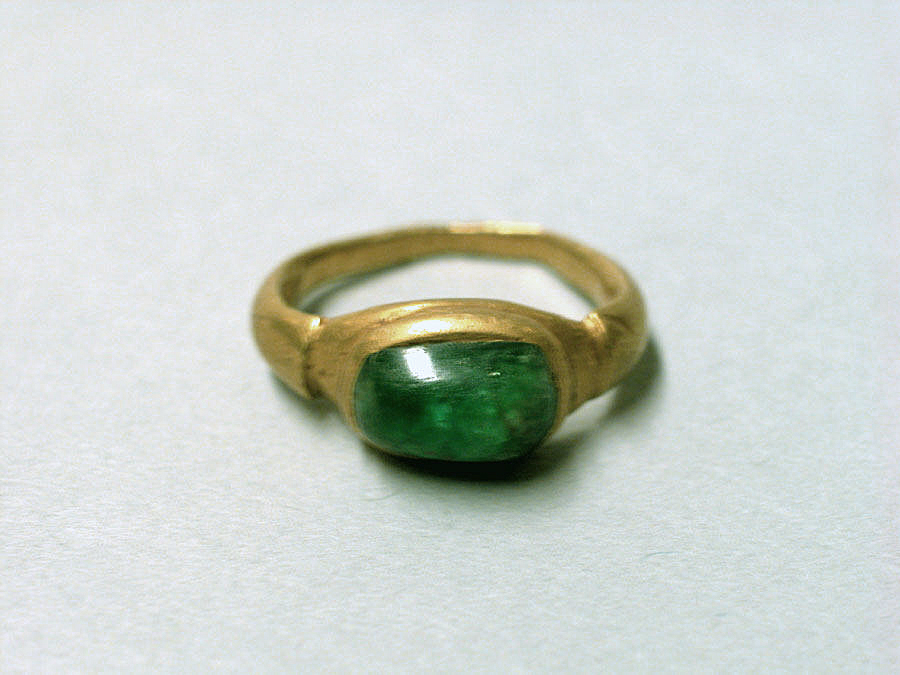
- A gold and beryl ring. The name is taken from the beryl used to make jewelry.
- Gender: Unisex

Origin
- Meaning: beryl

Other names
- Related names: Beril

Beryl is a given name with reference to the mineral beryl. Although more commonly a feminine given name, it has been used in the past as a masculine name, predominantly in the United States. Use as a male name likely comes from a variant spelling of the surname Burrell, whose seeming root is the Old French bovre, a reddish-brown woolen fabric with the resultant name denoting a worker in the wool trade. Beryl may also be a variant spelling of the Yiddish male name Berel.

Like most jewel names, Beryl's use as a feminine name dates from the late 19th-century: dancer Beryl de Zoete and actress Beryl Mercer would have been among the earliest namesakes being born respectively in 1879 and 1882. The female name Beryl was always more popular in the British Isles than in North America; since the mid-20th century the name has become somewhat unfashionable in the British Isles.

== Females ==
Females named Beryl include:

- Claire Adams (née Beryl Vere Nassau Adams), actress and benefactor
- Beryl Amedee, American politician
- Beryl T. (Sue) Atkins, British lexicographer
- Beryl Bainbridge, novelist
- Beryl Bartlett, South African tennis player
- Beryl Baxter (née M. Ivory), actress
- Beryl Beaurepaire, feminist
- Beryl Bernay, journalist, painter, and photographer
- Beryl Bender Birch, yoga teacher
- Beryl Booker, pianist
- Beryl Brewin (1910–1999), New Zealand marine zoologist
- Beryl Paston Brown, academic and teacher
- Beryl Annear Bryant, actress and theatrical producer
- Beryl Bryden, jazz singer
- Beryl Burton, racing cyclist
- Beryl Cook, artist best known for her paintings
- Beryl Cooke, actress
- Beryl Corner, doctor
- Beryl Crockford (formerly Mitchell; née Martin), rower
- Beryl Mildred Cryer, writer
- Beryl Cunningham, actress and model
- Beryl Davis, jazz singer
- Beryl Dean, British religious embroiderer
- Beryl May Dent (1900–1977), English mathematical physicist
- Beryl de Zoete, ballet dancer
- Beryl Donkin, legal secretary
- Beryl Esembe, sociologist and anthropologist
- Beryl Evans (née Williams), politician
- Beryl Ferguson, South African politician
- Beryl Fletcher, feminist author
- Beryl Fox, documentary film director and producer
- Beryl Gaffney, politician
- Béryl Gastaldello, swimmer
- Beryl Gilroy (née Answick), novelist and teacher
- Beryl Goldwyn Karney, ballet dancer
- Beryl Grant, nurse, community worker, and public servant
- Beryl Grey, ballet dancer
- Beryl "Beb" Hearnden, farmer, journalist, and author
- Beryl A. Howell, judge
- Beryl Hutchinson, British volunteer ambulance driver and officer of the First Aid Nursing Yeomanry
- Beryl Ingham, dancer and actress
- Beryl Elaine Jacka, administrator
- Beryl Jones (née Davies), politician
- Beryl Korot, video artist
- Béryl Laramé, athlete
- Beryl J. Levine, female justice
- Beryl Levinger, academic and teacher
- Beryl Markham (née Clutterbuck), horse trainer and aviator
- Beryl Marsden, singer
- Beryl Marshall, swimmer
- Beryl McBurnie, dancer
- Beryl McLeish (née King), civil servant and wartime superintendent
- Beryl Measor, actress
- Beryl Mercer, actress
- Beryl Mills, advertising agent, librarian, and beauty queen
- Beryl Nashar, geologist, academic, and teacher
- Beryl Noakes, swimmer
- Beryl Oliver, British charity administrator
- Beryl Penrose, tennis player
- Beryl H. Potter, American astronomical researcher
- Beryl Potter, Canadian disability activist
- Beryl Preston, British sailor
- Beryl Radin, scholar, scientist, editor, and teacher
- Beryl Randle, race walker and an athletics administrator
- Beryl Rawson (née Marie Wilkinson), writer, and teacher
- Beryl Reid, actress
- Beryl Roberts, American politician from Florida
- Beryl Rowland, historian and teacher
- Beryl Satter, historian and teacher
- Beryl Shereshewsky, American YouTuber
- Beryl Smalley, historian
- Beryl Smeeton, traveller
- Beryl Splatt, biochemist
- Beryl Swain (née J Tolman), road racer
- Beryl Te Wiata (née McMillan), actor, author, and scriptwriter
- Beryl Tsang, fibre artist
- Beryl Vertue, television producer
- Beryl Wallace (born Beatrice Heischuber), singer, dancer, and actress
- Beryl Wamira, athlete
- Beryl Williams, politician and school teacher

== Males ==
Males named Beryl include:

- Berle Adams (born Beryl Adasky), music industry executive and talent booking agent
- Beryl Anthony, American politician and father of Beryl Anthony Jr.
- Beryl Anthony Jr., politician
- Beryl F. Carroll, politician
- Beryl Clark, football player
- Beryl Drummond, basketball player
- Beryl Follet, football player
- Beryl Newman, Medal of Honor recipient
- Beryl Richmond, baseball player
- Barney Ross (born Dov-Ber "Beryl" David Rosofsky), boxer
- Beryl Rubinstein, composer
- Beryl Shipley, basketball coach
- Beryl Sprinkel, member of the Executive Office of the U.S. President
- Hallam Tennyson (radio producer) (1920–2005), English radio producer

== Pseudonym ==
- Stephen King (as Beryl Evans)

== Fictional characters ==
- Beryl, in EastEnders
- Queen Beryl, a villainess in the anime Sailor Moon
- Beryl Battersby, Geoffrey's love interest in The Lovers (1970 TV series)
- Beryl the Peril, British cartoon character, in The Topper and others
- Beryl Chugspoke, in Emmerdale
- Beryl Crossthwaite, in Emmerdale
- Beryl Patmore, the cook on the ITV series Downton Abbey
- Beryl Bouanich, in Reverse: 1999
