= Cowichan Leader =

Canadian newspaper

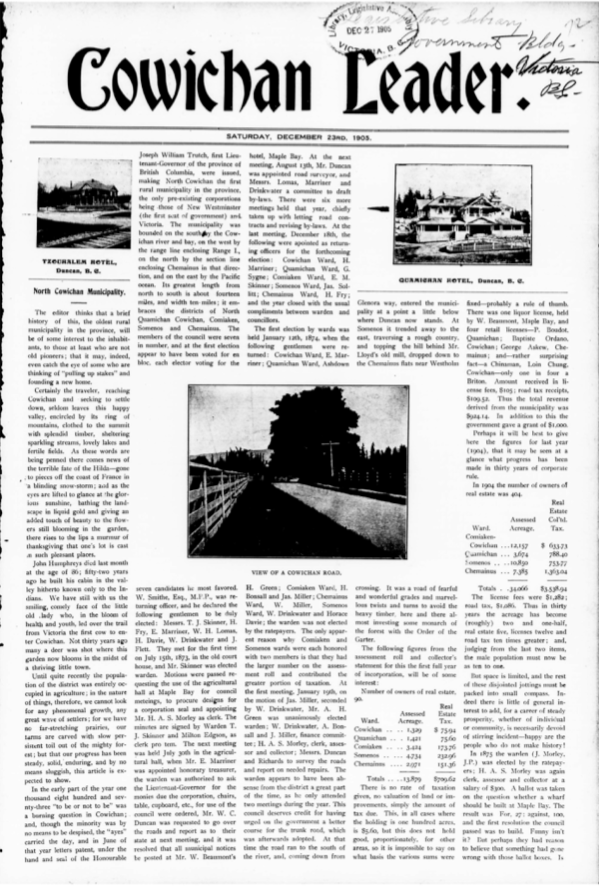
Cowichan Leader newspaper, front page, 1905 December 23

The Cowichan Leader was a Canadian newspaper published weekly in Duncan, on Vancouver Island in British Columbia, for 110 years until it ceased publication in April 2015. The paper not only served Duncan, but also the neighbouring Cowichan Valley communities of Chemainus, Cobble Hill, Crofton, Ladysmith, Youbou, Honeymoon Bay, Lake Cowichan, and Shawnigan Lake. The paper's closure occurred under the ownership of Black Press.

The Cowichan Leader was founded by Harry Smith in 1905, with the first issue appearing on April 28. Initial subscription rates were set at $2.00 per year, or $1.25 per half year. Prior to starting the Cowichan Leader, Smith also produced Duncan's very first newspaper, the Duncan's Enterprise, in 1900 when he found no newspaper existed in the settlement in which to advertise his general store, Duncan's Emporium. This early four page paper debuted on January 21, 1900, quickly changed its name to the Weekly Enterprise, but only lasted a year before it ceased, and was eventually replaced by the Leader in 1905. In January of 1908, another weekly Cowichan Valley newspaper, The Echo, was started by Ormond T. Smythe and A. Hope Herd, but by May 28, 1908, Smythe announced The Echo's amalgamation with The Cowichan Leader.

The Cowichan Leader was originally produced on the top floor of Smith's Emporium building on the northeast corner of Station and Craig Streets in downtown Duncan. Throughout the years, the paper's office moved several times, but spent a significant number of years at 151 Craig Street. In 1929, the existing structure on Craig Street was demolished and a new Art Deco style building was designed and built by Vancouver Island architect Douglas James. The building was designed to be as fireproof as possible with 8 inch thick reinforced concrete walls, floors uninterrupted by posts, and a roof supported by huge beams of Douglas fir. The exterior was finished with California stucco, a first in the district.

Notable contributors to the Cowichan Leader include Beryl Mildred Cryer, who with her sister, Maithal Ross, submitted 15 articles between December 15, 1927, and November 28, 1928, written in the style of the Vancouver Province's "Legends of the Capilanos" articles by E. Pauline Johnson The sisters, from the Halhed family of Chemainus, wrote under the pseudonym CRYOSS, and their articles, "Legends of the Cowichans" were interpretations of origin stories from the Hul'q'umi'num', a Coast Salish people of the Pacific Northwest Coast, as told to them by their neighbour, Mary Rice of the Penelakut First Nation.

In 1971, a competing Cowichan Valley newspaper, the Pictorial (1966-2008) bought the Cowichan Leader, but the two newspapers remained separate and distinct. The Leader, a broadsheet sized publication, was known as a traditional, more conservative paper, while the Pictorial was a weekend tabloid with advertisements, jokes, and cartoons.

In 1975, the Leader had a circulation of 10,000, with subscription rates set at $15 per year. In the mid-1980s, when Black Press bought both the Leader and the Pictorial, the Cowichan Leader (1905-1985) was merged with another acquisition, the Cowichan News (1976-1985), to form the Cowichan News Leader (1985-1994). After this merger, the Leader relocated to James Street, where it operated for 17 years until the building was destroyed by fire in March 2003. Despite having to suddenly move to a temporary location, not a single edition of the paper was missed.

In September 2008, Black Press consolidated the Cowichan News Leader and the Pictorial into the Cowichan News Leader Pictorial, and the paper ceased publication entirely in 2015. The closure established the Cowichan Valley Citizen, a competing paper purchased by Black Press during 2014 labour action by Cowichan News Leader Pictorial staff, as the only regional paper for a time.

Together, these various community papers reflect aspects of life in the Cowichan Valley throughout the intensive settlement and industrial development of the twentieth century, representing a rich body of community stories that support insight into social and political life, economic activity, and relations between the settlers who came to stay and the Cowichan people who are Indigenous to the Valley.

In 2018, the library of Vancouver Island University (VIU) undertook a project to digitize and provide an Open Access digital archive of early issues of the Cowichan Leader to ensure preservation of content of regional significance, as well as to provide access for citizens and scholars. Microform for the Cowichan papers is also held by the VIU Library, by the BC Archives, and by the Cowichan Valley Museum Archives.

== Editors ==
- Harry Smith, 1905-1907
- Martin M. Smith, 1907-1908
- Ormond T. Smythe, 1908-1910
- Louis J. Seymour, 1910
- Frank Arthur Brettingham, 1910-1911
- Edwyn Harry Lukin Johnston, 1911-1914
- Hugh George Egioke Savage, 1914-1957
- Brian LePine, ??-2000
- John McKinley, 2000-2015
