= Burl (disambiguation) =

A burl or burr is a deformed outgrowth on a tree trunk.

Burl may also refer to:

- Burl (given name)
- Burl (EP), 1986 EP by American band Killdozer
- Burl., botanic author abbreviation for mycologist Gertrude Simmons Burlingham (1872–1952)
- Dakota Burl, a type of composite wood material

== Surname ==
- Alex Burl (1931–2009), American football player
- Aubrey Burl (1926–2020), British archaeologist
- Ryan Burl (born 1994), Zimbabwean cricketer
- William-Francis Burl (1905–1966), British cyclist

== See also ==
- Berl (name)
- Burr (disambiguation)
- Burling, a surname
