= Bellur =

Bellur can refer to:

== People ==
=== Given name ===
- Bellur Krishnamachar Sundararaja Iyengar (1918–2014), Indian yoga teacher and author
- Bellur Narayanaswamy Srikrishna, Indian judge

=== Surname ===
- Hema Bellur, Indian actress
- Smita Bellur, Indian singer

== Villages in India ==
- Belluru Cross, village in Mandya district, Karnataka
- Bellur (Kasaragod), village in Kasaragod district, Kerala

== See also ==
- Belur (disambiguation)
- Dhinna Bellur, village in Dharmapuri district, Tamil Nadu, India
