= Beryl (disambiguation) =

Beryl is a mineral.

Beryl may also refer to:

== People ==
- Beryl (given name), and persons with the name
- Beryl (surname)

== Fictional characters ==
- Beryl the Peril, in UK comics
- Beryl (dragon) or Beryllinthranox, in Dragonlance series
- Queen Beryl, in the Sailor Moon franchise
- Beryl Chatterley, one of the characters in Kiff

== Places ==
- Beryl, Utah, US
- Beryl Junction, Utah, Iron County, US
- Beryl, West Virginia, Mineral County, West Virginia, US
- 1729 Beryl, an asteroid named for Beryl H. Potter

== Ships and aircraft ==
- Beryl-class container ship
- Beryl, a steam yacht completed in 1903 as Emerald
- HMAS Beryl II, a WWII Australian minesweeper
- Piel Beryl, a French 2-seater aircraft

== Music and television ==
- "Beryl", a song by Mark Knopfler from the Tracker album
- Beryl, a 2014 play by Maxine Peake about cyclist Beryl Burton
- "Beryl" (The Crown), a TV episode

== Technology ==
- FB Beryl, a Polish rifle
- FB Mini-Beryl, a Polish rifle
- Metropolitan-Vickers Beryl, a jet engine
- Beryl (window manager), part of Compiz software

== Other uses ==
- Beryl (company), a UK cycle light manufacturer
- Béryl incident, a 1962 French nuclear test
- List of storms named Beryl
  - Hurricane Beryl (2024)

== See also ==
- +Beryll, a clothing accessories brand
- Beryllium, the chemical element, named after the mineral
- Belur (disambiguation), a town in Karnataka, India, origin of the name beryl
- Berel (disambiguation)
