= Chhaap Tilak Sab Chheeni =

Song by Amir Khusrau
- Genre: Sufi music
- Songwriter: Amir Khusrau

Chhaap Tilak Sab Chheeni is a Braj Bhasha poem and song dedicated to the Sufi saint Nizamuddin Auliya. It is traditionally attributed to the 14th-century Indian Sufi mystic Amir Khusrau.

It is one of the most popular compositions attributed to Khusrau and is listened across the Indian subcontinent.

== Text and translation ==
English	Nastaliq	Devanagari	Latin Transliteration
You've taken away my identity (prayer callus, tilak), and everything from me by looking into my eyes. You've said the unsaid (agam = secrets of divine nature), just by a glance. By making me drink from the furnace of love. You've intoxicated me by just a glance; My fair, delicate wrists with green bangles on them, You have held my wrists tightly with just a glance. I give my life to you, Oh my cloth-dyer, You've dyed me like yourself, by just a glance. I give my whole life to you Oh, Nizam (Nizamuddin Auliya) You've made me your bride, by just a glance. You've said the wonder, by just a glance.	چھاپ تلک سب چھینی رے موسے نینا ملائیکے بات اگم کہہ دینی رے موسے نینا ملائیکے پریم بھٹی کا مدھوا پلائیکے متوالی کر لينی رے موسے نینا ملائیکے گوری گوری بياں، ہری ہری چوڑیاں بياں پکڑ ہر لينی رے موسے نینا ملائیکے بل بل جاؤں میں تورے رنگ رجوا اپنی سی رنگ دينی رے موسے نینا ملائیکے خسرو نظام کے بل بل جائے موہے سہاگن کر دینی رے موسے نینا ملائیکے چھاپ تلک سب چھینی رے موسے نینا ملائیکے بات عجب کہہ دینی رے موسے نینا ملائیکے	छाप तिलक सब छीनी रे मोसे नैना मिलाइके बात अगम कह दीनी रे मोसे नैना मिलाइके प्रेम भटी का मधवा पिलाइके मतवाली कर लीनी रे मोसे नैना मिलाइके गोरी गोरी बईयाँ, हरी हरी चूड़ियाँ बईयाँ पकड़ हर लीनी रे मोसे नैना मिलाइके बल बल जाऊं मैं तोरे रंग रजवा अपनी सी रंग दीनी रे मोसे नैना मिलाइके ख़ुसरो निजाम के बल बल जाए मोहे सुहागन कीनी रे मोसे नैना मिलाइके बात अजब कह दीनी रे मोसे नैना मिलाइके	Chaāp tilak sab chhīnī re mose nainā milāike Bāt agam keh dīnī re mose nainā milāike Prem bhaṭī kā madhvā pilāike Matvālī kar līnī re mose nainā milāike Gorī gorī baīyān, harī harī chuṛiyān Baīyān pakaṛ har līnī re mose nainā milāike Bal bal jāūn main tore rang rajvā Apnī sī rang dinī re mose nainā milāike Khusro nizaam ke bal bal jaiye Mohe suhāgan kīnī re mose nainā milāike Bāt ajab keh dīnī re mose nainā milāike

== Popular culture ==
This has been sung in the qawwali format by Indian and Pakistani qawwals and other singers, including Ustad Nusrat Fateh Ali Khan, Naheed Akhtar, Mehnaz Begum, Abida Parveen, the Sabri Brothers, Iqbal Hussain Khan Bandanawazi, Farid Ayaz & Abu Muhammad Qawwal, Jafar Hussain Khan, Ustad Vilayat Khan, Ustad Shujaat Khan, Zila Khan, Nizami Bandhu, Hadiqa Kiani, Smita Bellur, Lata Mangeshkar, Asha Bhosle, Rahat Fateh Ali Khan, Kailash Kher, Kavita Seth and Maithili Thakur.

The 1978 Indian film Main Tulsi Tere Aangan Ki featured a version by Lata Mangeshkar and Asha Bhosle. Another popular version, by Abida Parveen and Rahat Fateh Ali Khan, appeared on the Pakistani musical variety show Coke Studio. Other Indian films which include the ghazal include Saat Uchakkey (2016) where it is sung by Keerthi Sagathia (composed by Bapi–Tutul), Unpaused (2020) - composed by Shishir A Samant and sung by Samant and Sunil Kamath.
