= Samuel Guthrie (politician) =

Canadian politician

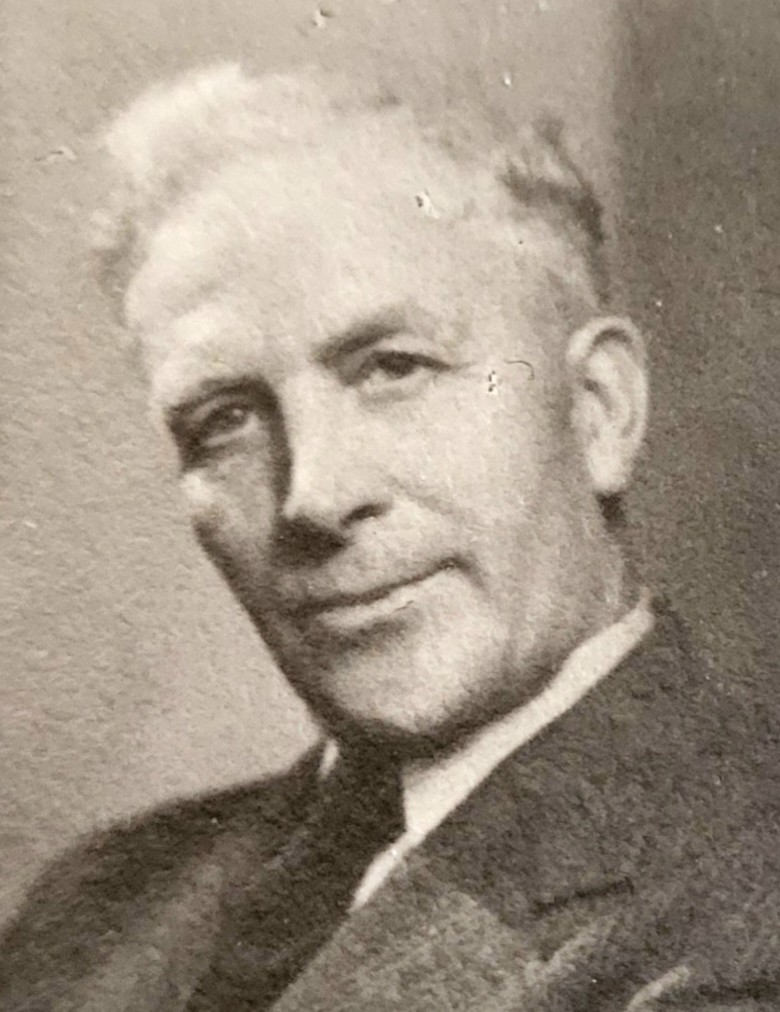

Samuel "Sam" Guthrie (1885 – January 25, 1960) was a Scottish-born miner, farmer and political figure in British Columbia. He represented Newcastle from 1920 to 1924 as a Federated Labour member and Cowichan-Newcastle from 1937 to 1949 as a Co-operative Commonwealth Federation member in the Legislative Assembly of British Columbia.

He was born in East Kilbride, Lanarkshire and worked as a boy in the Scottish coal mines. Guthrie came to Canada in 1911 and settled on Vancouver Island south of Nanaimo. He was once again employed in the coal mines. He was jailed for two years following a long strike. After his release, Guthrie began farming. He was elected to the assembly in 1920 and then defeated in 1924, 1928 and 1933. After his defeat in the 1949 provincial election, he retired from politics and lived in North Oyster. He died there at the age of 75.

== Election results ==
1920 British Columbia general election: Newcastle
Party	Candidate	Votes	%	±%
Federated Labour	Samuel Guthrie	704	42.00	New
Coalition	William Gilbert Fraser	424	25.30	(18.59)
Independent Socialist	James Hurst Hawthornthwaite	419	25.00	(31.11)
Independent Soldier	John Bickle	129	7.70	New
Total votes		1,676	100.00	
Source(s) An Electoral History of British Columbia, 1871-1986 (PDF). Victoria: Elections British Columbia. 1988. p. 142. ISBN 0-7718-8677-2.

1924 British Columbia general election: Cowichan-Newcastle
Party	Candidate	Votes	%	±%
Conservative	Cyril Francis Davie	1,246	31.26	–
Labour	Samuel Guthrie	1,132	28.40	–
Provincial	Kenneth Forrest Duncan	870	21.83	–
Liberal	Wymond Wolverton Walkem	738	18.51	–
Total valid votes		3,986	100.00	
Source(s) An Electoral History of British Columbia, 1871-1986 (PDF). Victoria: Elections British Columbia. 1988. p. 151. ISBN 0-7718-8677-2.

1928 British Columbia general election: Cowichan-Newcastle
Party	Candidate	Votes	%	±%
Conservative	Cyril Francis Davie	2,360	58.17	26.91
Independent Labour	Samuel Guthrie	1,607	39.61	11.21
Independent	St. George Gray	90	2.22	New
Total valid votes		4,057	100.00	
Total rejected ballots		108	2.59	
Source(s) An Electoral History of British Columbia, 1871-1986 (PDF). Victoria: Elections British Columbia. 1988. p. 161. ISBN 0-7718-8677-2.

1933 British Columbia general election: Cowichan-Newcastle
Party	Candidate	Votes	%
Oxford Group	Hugh George Egioke Savage	1,655	40.88
Co-operative Commonwealth	Samuel Guthrie	1,288	31.82
Independent Conservative	Cyril Francis Davie	585	14.45
Liberal	David Ramsay	520	12.85
Total valid votes		4,048	100.00
Total rejected ballots		6	
Source(s) An Electoral History of British Columbia, 1871-1986 (PDF). Victoria: Elections British Columbia. 1988. p. 175. ISBN 0-7718-8677-2.

1937 British Columbia general election: Cowichan-Newcastle
Party	Candidate	Votes	%	±%
Co-operative Commonwealth	Samuel Guthrie	1,560	33.58	1.76
Liberal	Arnold Christmas Flett	1,224	26.35	13.50
Independent	Hugh George Egioke Savage	1,222	26.31	-14.57
Conservative	Clement Pemberton Deykin	639	13.76	Returned
Total valid votes		4,645	100.00	
Total rejected ballots		42	0.90	
Source(s) An Electoral History of British Columbia, 1871-1986 (PDF). Victoria: Elections British Columbia. 1988. p. 185. ISBN 0-7718-8677-2.

1941 British Columbia general election: Cowichan-Newcastle
Party	Candidate	Votes	%	±%
Co-operative Commonwealth	Samuel Guthrie	2,757	47.22	13.64
Liberal	Arnold Christmas Flett	1,739	29.78	3.43
Conservative	Edmund William Neel	1,343	23.00	9.24
Total valid votes		5,839	100.00	
Total rejected ballots		61	1.03	
Source(s) An Electoral History of British Columbia, 1871-1986 (PDF). Victoria: Elections British Columbia. 1988. p. 195. ISBN 0-7718-8677-2.

1945 British Columbia general election: Cowichan-Newcastle
Party	Candidate	Votes	%	±%
Co-operative Commonwealth	Samuel Guthrie	3,768	55.33	8.11
Coalition	Macgregor Fullarton Macintosh	3,042	44.67	21.67
Total valid votes		6,810	100.00	
Total rejected ballots		68	0.99	
Source(s) An Electoral History of British Columbia, 1871-1986 (PDF). Victoria: Elections British Columbia. 1988. p. 205. ISBN 0-7718-8677-2.

1949 British Columbia general election: Cowichan-Newcastle
Party	Candidate	Votes	%	±%
Coalition	Andrew Mowatt Whisker	5,505	56.19	New
Co-operative Commonwealth	Samuel Guthrie	4,194	42.81	8.11
Independent	Thomas James Boyles	60	0.61	New
Union of Electors	Norman Webster Joyce	38	0.39	New
Total valid votes		9,797	100.00	
Total rejected ballots		217	2.17	
Source(s) An Electoral History of British Columbia, 1871-1986 (PDF). Victoria: Elections British Columbia. 1988. p. 215. ISBN 0-7718-8677-2.
