= Berle (disambiguation) =

Berle may refer to:

== Places ==
- Berle, a village on the west coast of Norway.
- Berlé, village in the commune of Winseler, in north-western Luxembourg

== Given name ==
- Berle-Kari, viking chieftain in ninth-century Norway
- Berle Adams (1917–2009), American music industry executive
- Berle Brant (born 1989), Estonian footballer
- Berle M. Schiller (1944–2025), Judge of the United States District Court for the Eastern District of Pennsylvania

== Others ==
- Berle (surname), various people
