= Berel =

Berel (Yiddish: בערעל, Hebrew: ברל) is a masculine given name which may refer to:

- Berel Lang (born 1933), American historian and author
- Berel Lazar (born 1964), Orthodox rabbi, one of two claimants to the title "Chief Rabbi of Russia"
- Baruch Dov Povarsky (born 1931), often referred to as Rabbi Berel Povarsky, a rosh yeshiva
- Dov Schwartzman (1921–2011), also called Berel Schwartzman, Russian-born American Haredi Jewish rabbi, educator and Talmudic scholar
- Berel Soloveitchik (1915–1981), a rosh yeshiva ("head of the yeshiva") of the Brisk yeshivas in Jerusalem
- Berel Wein (1934–2025), American-born Israeli Orthodox rabbi, scholar, lecturer and writer

== See also ==
- Berl
- Beryl (disambiguation)
- Barile (disambiguation)
