= Burgl =

Burgl is a feminine given name. Notable people with the name include:

- Burgl Färbinger (1945–2025), German alpine skier
- Burgl Heckmair (born 1976), German snowboarder

== See also ==
- Bürgl Hut
- Burl (given name)
