= Cyril Francis Davie =

Canadian politician (1882–1950)

Cyril Francis Davie (January 30, 1882 – February 18, 1950) was a lawyer and political figure in British Columbia, Canada. He represented Cowichan-Newcastle in the Legislative Assembly of British Columbia from 1924 to 1933 as a Conservative.

He was born in Victoria, the son of Alexander Edmund Batson Davie and Constance L. Skinner, and was educated at the University of Ottawa. Davie married Beatrice Pearl Raymond in 1911. He was speaker for the assembly from 1931 to 1933. Davie was defeated when he ran for reelection in 1933. He lived in Duncan.

Davie wrote a chess column for the Daily Colonist in Victoria for a number of years. He founded the Canadian branch of the Chess Amateur Correspondence League and organized the first chess championship held in Canada.

Davie died in Duncan at the age of 68.

== Election results ==
1924 British Columbia general election: Cowichan-Newcastle
Party	Candidate	Votes	%	±%
Conservative	Cyril Francis Davie	1,246	31.26	–
Labour	Samuel Guthrie	1,132	28.40	–
Provincial	Kenneth Forrest Duncan	870	21.83	–
Liberal	Wymond Wolverton Walkem	738	18.51	–
Total valid votes		3,986	100.00	
Source(s) An Electoral History of British Columbia, 1871-1986 (PDF). Victoria: Elections British Columbia. 1988. p. 151. ISBN 0-7718-8677-2.

1928 British Columbia general election: Cowichan-Newcastle
Party	Candidate	Votes	%	±%
Conservative	Cyril Francis Davie	2,360	58.17	26.91
Independent Labour	Samuel Guthrie	1,607	39.61	11.21
Independent	St. George Gray	90	2.22	New
Total valid votes		4,057	100.00	
Total rejected ballots		108	2.59	
Source(s) An Electoral History of British Columbia, 1871-1986 (PDF). Victoria: Elections British Columbia. 1988. p. 161. ISBN 0-7718-8677-2.

1933 British Columbia general election: Cowichan-Newcastle
Party	Candidate	Votes	%
Oxford Group	Hugh George Egioke Savage	1,655	40.88
Co-operative Commonwealth	Samuel Guthrie	1,288	31.82
Independent Conservative	Cyril Francis Davie	585	14.45
Liberal	David Ramsay	520	12.85
Total valid votes		4,048	100.00
Total rejected ballots		6	
Source(s) An Electoral History of British Columbia, 1871-1986 (PDF). Victoria: Elections British Columbia. 1988. p. 175. ISBN 0-7718-8677-2.
