= List of Grand Prix motorcycle racers: V =

This is a list of Grand Prix motorcycle racers whose last names start with the letter V.

== V ==
- (Australia) Chris Vermeulen
- (Belgium) Pierrot Vervroegen
- (Italy) Walter Villa
- (Spain) Isaac Viñales
- (Spain) Maverick Viñales
- (France) Arnaud Vincent
- (Netherlands) Jan de Vries
- (United Kingdom) Jason Vincent
