= Berl =

Berl (Yiddish: בערל, Hebrew: ברל) is a masculine given name and surname.

== Given name ==
- Berl Broder (1817–1868), Ukrainian Jewish singer
- Berl Huffman (1907–1990), American multi-sport coach
- Berl Katznelson (1887–1944), founder of Labor Zionism
- Berl Kutchinsky (1935–1995), Danish Professor of Criminology
- Berl Locker (1887–1972), Zionist activist and Israeli politician
- Berl Priebe (1918–2014), American farmer and politician
- Berl Repetur (1902–1989), Zionist activist and Israeli politician
- Berl Senofsky (1926−2002), American classical violinist and teacher

== Surname ==
- Emmanuel Berl (1892–1976), French journalist, historian and essayist
- Christine Berl (born 1943), American composer, pianist, and Egyptian-style Oriental dancer

== See also ==
- Beit Berl, settlement in Israel
- Berl., taxonomic author abbreviation for Augusto Napoleone Berlese (1864–1903), Italian botanist and mycologist
- A. Berl., taxonomic author abbreviation for Antonio Berlese (1863–1927), Italian entomologist
- Berel
- Berle (surname)
- Beryl (given name)
- Burl (disambiguation)
- Lucy Burle (born 1955), Brazilian international freestyle and butterfly swimmer
