= Beryl Swain =

British motorcycle racer

- Swain aboard her 1962 TT race entry 50 cc Itom motorcycle
- Nationality: British
- Born: 22 January 1936; Walthamstow, England
- Died: 15 May 2007 (aged 71); Epping, England
Motorcycle racing career statistics
50cc World Championship
Active years	1962
Manufacturers	Itom
Starts / Wins / Podiums / Poles / F. laps / Points; 1 / 0 / 0 / 0 / 0 / 0
Isle of Man TT career
TTs contested	1 (1962)
TT wins	0
TT podiums	0

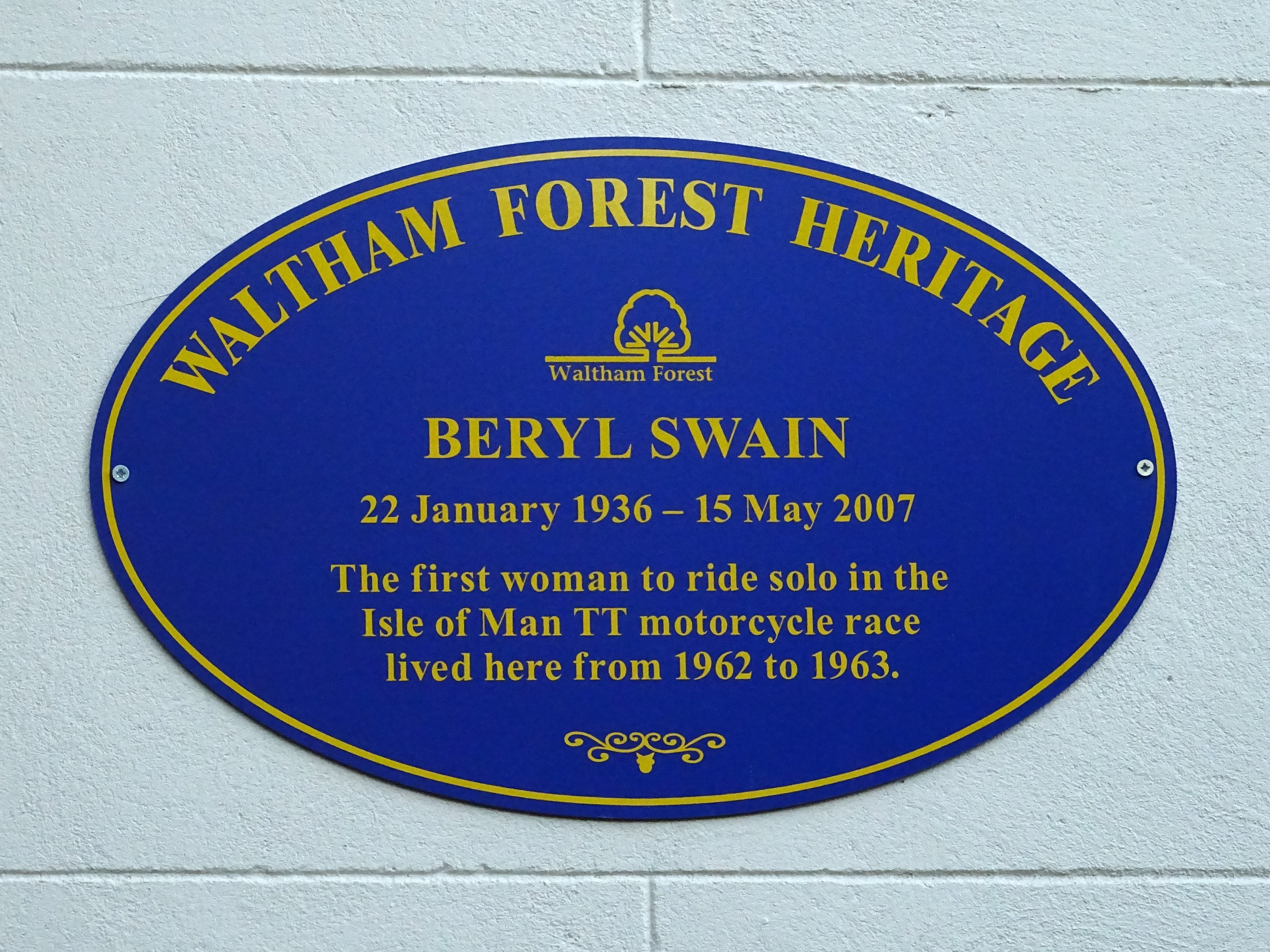
Beryl Swain - Waltham Forest Heritage blue plaque

Beryl Swain (née Beryl J Tolman, 22 January 1936 – 15 May 2007) was a female road racer of solo motorcycles from the London area. In 1962, she was the first woman to compete in a TT race for solo motorcycles on the Isle of Man TT course.

== Early life ==
Beryl Tolman was born on 22 January 1936 and brought up in Walthamstow, in North East London. She worked as a senior secretary at P&O in the City until she married Edwin Swain, a motorcycle shop owner, in 1958.

== Racing motorcycles ==
Swain was noted for being the first woman to compete in a TT race for solo motorcycles on the Isle of Man TT course, a rare occurrence to this day on one of the world's most famous races held on closed public roads. This 1962 upset led the male-dominated world of motorcycle racing to revoke her international licence via the introduction of a minimum weight limit which she could not meet, due to the perception of the sport being too dangerous for women, and the resulting ban on female entrants persisted until Hilary Musson competed in 1978.

Swain finished 22nd on a 50 cc race-prepared Itom after two laps of the Mountain circuit in the 1962 Race. Her average speed was 48.3 mph after her bike lost top gear (of the three-speed transmission) on the second lap. This was the first time a 50cc event had been included in the Island's programme as from 1962 the class carried World Championship points.

== Motorcycle Grand Prix results ==
Position	1	2	3	4	5	6
Points	8	6	4	3	2	1

(key) (Races in italics indicate fastest lap)

Year	Class	Team	1	2	3	4	5	6	7	8	9	10	Points	Rank
1962	50cc	Itom	ESP	FRA	IOM; 22	NED	BEL	GER	DDR	NAT	FIN	ARG	0	—

== Later life ==
After her racing career was cut short, Swain, who was previously an office worker, embarked on a retail management career with Sainsbury's grocery supermarkets around the London area. She retired to Woodford, Essex, and later Epping, becoming secretary to WI local branches of the Women's Institute and helping organise meals on wheels for the elderly. Towards the end of her life, she suffered from Alzheimer's disease, and died on 15 May 2007, aged 71.

== Commemoration ==
A blue plaque was erected in Swain's honour at her former home at 18 Grosvenor Park Road, Walthamstow, London E17 9PA by Waltham Forest Council as part of the local Waltham Forest Heritage scheme on 31 May 2019.
