= Beril (given name) =

- Gender: Female
- Language: Turkish

Origin
- Language: Greek
- Meaning: beryl

Other names
- Related names: Beryl

Beril is a common feminine Turkish given name. It is derived from the word for the mineral beryl, a transparent gemstone that comes in various colors. Notable people with the name include:

- Beril Böcekler (born 2004), Turkish swimmer
- Ayşe Beril Boyacı (born 2008), Turkish judoka
- Beril Dedeoğlu (1961–2019), Turkish academic
- Beril Jents (1918–2013), Australian fashion designer

== See also ==
- Beryl (given name)
