= Cowichan-Newcastle =

Electoral district in British Columbia, Canada

Cowichan-Newcastle was a provincial electoral district in the Canadian province of British Columbia. It first appeared for the 1924 provincial election, and was later redistributed into Cowichan-Malahat and Nanaimo for the 1966 election.

== MLAs elected ==
Parliament	Term	MLA
16th	1924–1928	Cyril Francis Davie
17th	1928–1933	Cyril Francis Davie
18th	1933–1937	Hugh George Egioke Savage
19th	1937–1941	Samuel Guthrie
20th	1941–1945	Samuel Guthrie
21st	1945–1949	Samuel Guthrie
22nd	1949–1952	Andrew Mowatt Whisker
23rd	1952–1953	Robert Martin Strachan
24th	1953–1956	Robert Martin Strachan
25th	1956–1960	Robert Martin Strachan
26th	1960–1963	Robert Martin Strachan
27th	1963–1966	Robert Martin Strachan

== Electoral history ==
=== Elections ===
1924 British Columbia general election
Party	Candidate	Votes	%	±%
Conservative	Cyril Francis Davie	1,246	31.26	–
Labour	Samuel Guthrie	1,132	28.40	–
Provincial	Kenneth Forrest Duncan	870	21.83	–
Liberal	Wymond Wolverton Walkem	738	18.51	–
Total valid votes		3,986	100.00	
Source(s) An Electoral History of British Columbia, 1871-1986 (PDF). Victoria: Elections British Columbia. 1988. p. 151. ISBN 0-7718-8677-2.

1928 British Columbia general election
Party	Candidate	Votes	%	±%
Conservative	Cyril Francis Davie	2,360	58.17	26.91
Independent Labour	Samuel Guthrie	1,607	39.61	11.21
Independent	St. George Gray	90	2.22	New
Total valid votes		4,057	100.00	
Total rejected ballots		108	2.59	
Source(s) An Electoral History of British Columbia, 1871-1986 (PDF). Victoria: Elections British Columbia. 1988. p. 161. ISBN 0-7718-8677-2.

1933 British Columbia general election
Party	Candidate	Votes	%
Oxford Group	Hugh George Egioke Savage	1,655	40.88
Co-operative Commonwealth	Samuel Guthrie	1,288	31.82
Independent Conservative	Cyril Francis Davie	585	14.45
Liberal	David Ramsay	520	12.85
Total valid votes		4,048	100.00
Total rejected ballots		6	
Source(s) An Electoral History of British Columbia, 1871-1986 (PDF). Victoria: Elections British Columbia. 1988. p. 175. ISBN 0-7718-8677-2.

1937 British Columbia general election
Party	Candidate	Votes	%	±%
Co-operative Commonwealth	Samuel Guthrie	1,560	33.58	1.76
Liberal	Arnold Christmas Flett	1,224	26.35	13.50
Independent	Hugh George Egioke Savage	1,222	26.31	-14.57
Conservative	Clement Pemberton Deykin	639	13.76	Returned
Total valid votes		4,645	100.00	
Total rejected ballots		42	0.90	
Source(s) An Electoral History of British Columbia, 1871-1986 (PDF). Victoria: Elections British Columbia. 1988. p. 185. ISBN 0-7718-8677-2.

1941 British Columbia general election
Party	Candidate	Votes	%	±%
Co-operative Commonwealth	Samuel Guthrie	2,757	47.22	13.64
Liberal	Arnold Christmas Flett	1,739	29.78	3.43
Conservative	Edmund William Neel	1,343	23.00	9.24
Total valid votes		5,839	100.00	
Total rejected ballots		61	1.03	
Source(s) An Electoral History of British Columbia, 1871-1986 (PDF). Victoria: Elections British Columbia. 1988. p. 195. ISBN 0-7718-8677-2.

1945 British Columbia general election
Party	Candidate	Votes	%	±%
Co-operative Commonwealth	Samuel Guthrie	3,768	55.33	8.11
Coalition	Macgregor Fullarton Macintosh	3,042	44.67	21.67
Total valid votes		6,810	100.00	
Total rejected ballots		68	0.99	
Source(s) An Electoral History of British Columbia, 1871-1986 (PDF). Victoria: Elections British Columbia. 1988. p. 205. ISBN 0-7718-8677-2.

1949 British Columbia general election
Party	Candidate	Votes	%	±%
Coalition	Andrew Mowatt Whisker	5,505	56.19	New
Co-operative Commonwealth	Samuel Guthrie	4,194	42.81	8.11
Independent	Thomas James Boyles	60	0.61	New
Union of Electors	Norman Webster Joyce	38	0.39	New
Total valid votes		9,797	100.00	
Total rejected ballots		217	2.17	
Source(s) An Electoral History of British Columbia, 1871-1986 (PDF). Victoria: Elections British Columbia. 1988. p. 215. ISBN 0-7718-8677-2.

1952 British Columbia general election Three counts undertaken
Party	Candidate	Votes 1st count	%	Votes final count	%
Co-operative Commonwealth	Robert Martin Strachan	4,636	43.34	5,697	58.36
Liberal	Andrew Mowatt Whisker	2,711	25.35	4,064	41.64
Social Credit	William Hindle Bryant	1,886	17.63		
Conservative	James Chesterfield Wragg	1,463	13.68		
Total valid votes		10,696	100.00	9,761	91.26
Total rejected/exhausted ballots		334	3.03	935	8.74

1953 British Columbia general election Five counts undertaken
Party	Candidate	Votes 1st count	%	Votes final count	%
Co-operative Commonwealth	Robert Martin Strachan	4,517	43.73	5,345	57.95
Social Credit	Percy Hawkings	2,686	26.00	3,878	42.05
Liberal	Andrew Mowatt Whisker	2,330	22.56		
Progressive Conservative	James Chesterfield Wragg	510	4.94		
Labor-Progressive	Myrtle Woodward Bergren	168	1.63		
Independent	William Hindle Bryant	118	1.14		
Total valid votes		10,329	100.00	9,223	89.29
Total rejected/exhausted ballots		500	4.62	1,106	10.71

1956 British Columbia general election
Party	Candidate	Votes	%	±%
Co-operative Commonwealth	Robert Martin Strachan	5,015	51.18	7.45
Social Credit	Charles William Parker	3,173	32.38	6.38
Liberal	Robert James Harvey	1,611	16.44	-6.12
Total valid votes		9,799	100.00	
Total rejected ballots		91	0.92	

1960 British Columbia general election
Party	Candidate	Votes	%	±%
Co-operative Commonwealth	Robert Martin Strachan	6,261	58.68	7.50
Social Credit	Hazel Viola Fee	3,033	28.43	-3.95
Progressive Conservative	John Joseph Kerrone	1,206	11.30	Returned
Communist	Hjalmar Peter Bergren	170	1.59	New
Total valid votes		10,670	100.00	
Total rejected ballots		115	1.07	

1963 British Columbia general election
Party	Candidate	Votes	%	±%
New Democratic	Robert Martin Strachan	5,422	50.47	-8.21
Social Credit	Donald Christopher Morton	3,576	33.29	4.86
Liberal	George Wilfrid Whittaker	904	8.42	Returned
Progressive Conservative	Cyril Craig	840	7.82	-3.48
Total valid votes		10,742	100.00	
Total rejected ballots		92	0.85	

=== Timelines (1924-1963) ===
View source data.
Graph of Cowichan-Newcastle election results by share of votes, 1924–1963. First-preference results are noted for the 1952 and 1953 elections.
