= Velur =

These towns and villages in India are called Velur, Veloor, or Vellore:

- Velur, Tuticorin, Tamil Nadu
- Velur, Namakkal, Tamil Nadu
- Velur, Thanjavur, Tamil Nadu
- Velur, Thrissur, Kerala
- Veloor, Kottayam, Kerala
- Vellore, Tamil Nadu

== See also ==
- Belur (disambiguation)
