= 50 cc Grand Prix motorcycle racing =

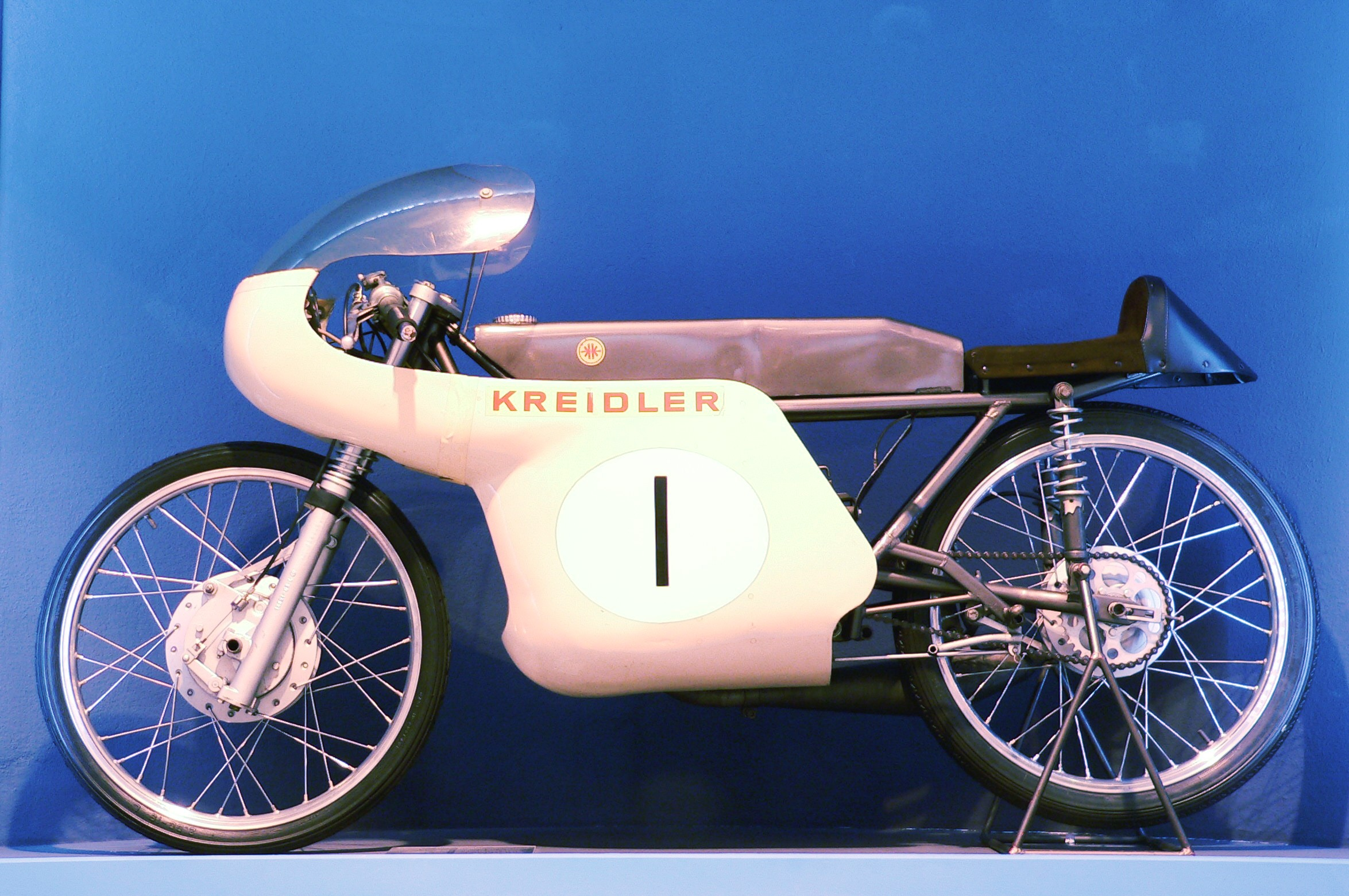
1963 50 cc Kreidler Renn-Florett

The 50 cc class was the ultra-lightweight class in Grand Prix motorcycle racing, and formed part of the Fédération Internationale de Motocyclisme (FIM) World Championships from 1962 until 1983; when the class was replaced by 80 cc.

== History and development of the class ==
The relative low cost and increasing availability of 50 cc motorcycles in the post-war period, spawned a number of club road racing events for this size of machine in the early 1950s. With the earliest events being held in Italy and in the UK. The potential of this class for providing entertaining but affordable racing was soon recognised with several national championships and in 1961 the FIM introduced The Coupe d' Europe, a series of international events for 50 cc machines, each with a minimum duration and run to established Grand Prix rules and regulations. The series attracted a variety of entries, but the dominating force were the works Kreidler team bikes. Based on a standard Kreidler Florett road bike, their single cylinder Kreidler Renn-Floretts featured lightweight frames, a special cylinder head and barrel, twin 16 mm Bing carburettors feeding the engine through rotary valves and improved suspension and brakes. By the end of the season, with the addition of rudimentary streamlining and the increase of carburettor size to 17 mm, the 9 hp (6.7 kW) four-speed two-stroke bikes could top over 85 mph.

== The 1961 Coupe d’Europe ==
Round	1	2	3	4	5	6	7	8
Date	30 April	7 May	14 May	4 June	9 July	20 August	16 September	15 October
Location	(Belgium) Circuit de Mouscron	(West Germany) St Wendel, Saarland	(Germany) Hockenheimring	(Belgium) Zolder	(Socialist Federal Republic of Yugoslavia) Opatija	(Netherlands) Zandvoort	(Belgium) Circuit du Heysel, Brussels	(Spain) Zaragoza
Event	3me Prix De Mouscron		Grosser Preis von Deutschland	3me Prijs Zolder-Centrum				X Premio Internacional Fiestas del Pilar
Winner	(Belgium) Pierrot Vervroegen	(Germany) Hans-Georg Anscheidt	(Socialist Federal Republic of Yugoslavia) Miro Zelnik	(Germany) Hans-Georg Anscheidt	(Germany) Hans-Georg Anscheidt	(Germany) Hans-Georg Anscheidt	(Germany) Wolfgang Gedlich	(Spain) César Gracía
Machine	Itom	Kreidler	Tomos D5	Kreidler	Kreidler	Kreidler	Kreidler	Ducson

== World Championship Status ==
See 1962 Season, 1963 Season, 1964 Season, 1965 Season, 1966 Season, 1967 Season

In 1962, the FIM followed up the success of the Coupe d’ Europe by giving the 50 cc class World Championship status. As well as the works entries of existing European manufacturers like Kreidler and Tomos, this development also attracted entries from Japanese manufacturers with both Honda and Suzuki entering full work's teams. The Spanish Derbi factory also entered a single work's bike for the Spanish Grand Prix.

The Kreidlers were now fitted with three speed overdrives controlled from the twistgrip, which coupled to the standard four-speed gearbox gave twelve gears to help keep the engines at maximum power. Engine development also increased power to 10 hp (7.5 kW) at 11,000 rpm. The Kreidlers development would be hampered however by the factory's insistence that the race bikes remained fundamentally based upon their standard road machines. Suzuki and Honda knew no such limitations.

Honda's commitment to four-stroke engines dated back to 1951 with the launch of its Dream E-Type

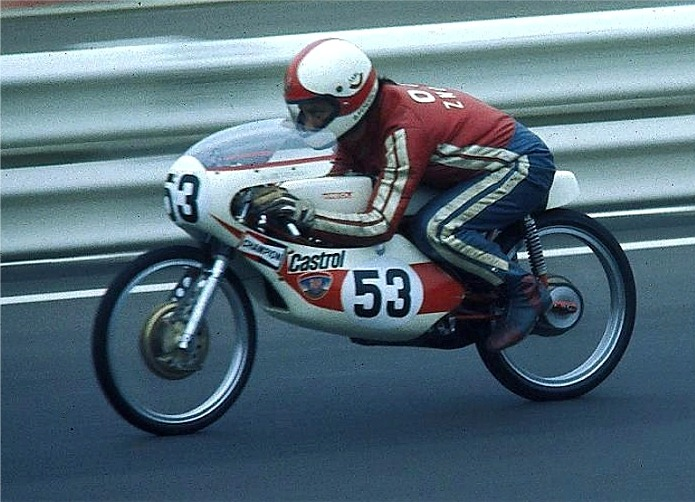
Bedrich Fendrich practicing for the 1976 German GP on his Kreidler

prior to this all Honda's bikes were two-strokes. The change and long-term commitment to the more sophisticated four-stroke technology came either directly from founder Soichiro Honda or indirectly due to pressure from managing director Takeo Fujisawa, who was said to be appalled by the noise and smoke that two-stroke engines produced and the additional hassle that Honda customers faced by having to mix oil with their fuel. Honda began their first 50 cc GP season with the RC110, announced at the Japanese Motor Show in 1961. Powered by a single cylinder, four-valve engine, and with gear driven double overhead cams, giving about 9 hp (6.7 kW) at 14,000 rpm. It was introduced with a five-speed gearbox, but by the time of the opening GP in Spain, the bikes were upgraded to six gears. Even so, they were badly outperformed. Rider Tommy Robb suggested that more gears might be the answer and was amazed to find a week later at the French GP that the gearbox had been expanded to eight speeds. This still wasn't enough to compensate for the machine's relative lack of power and three weeks later at the Isle of Man TT, nine gears were fitted and the rev limit increased to 17,000 rpm with output now up to around 10 hp. In that season, the machine's designation was changed to RC111, but Honda's records are unclear as to what precise change in the development this signified or when it was used.

In contrast, the Suzuki team were committed to two-stroke technology and their single cylinder RM62 machine featured rotary valve induction and an 8-speed transmission and produced about 10 hp (7.5 kW) at 12,000 rpm. Ernst Degner who had defected from the East German MZ team to Suzuki the previous year, brought with him the secrets of MZ's two-stroke tuning success which undoubtedly helped him and the Suzuki team to secure the inaugural 50 cc World Championship.

== The Japanese withdraw ==
After the withdrawal of Honda (and Bridgestone) after the 1966 season, Suzuki was the only Japanese firm entered in the 1967 50 cc category, winning each and every GP, often with a one-lap advantage on its closest competitors. At the end of 1967, cost-saving technological restrictions were introduced by the FIM, to be applied as from 1969. It led Suzuki to retire as well, leaving factory machines and parts to Hans-Georg Anscheidt and Stuart Graham for the 1968. Spanish rider Angel Nieto came to the fore, and between 1969 and 1976, won the championship six times. His season long battle for the 1972 championship with Dutchman Jan de Vries, being perhaps the closest fought championship in any form of motor racing. By the end of the season both riders were tied with equal points, an equal number of wins and an equal number of second-place finishes and the championship winner was determined by adding together and comparing the times for the six races in which the pair had been placed. Nieto was calculated to have won the title by 21½ seconds from his rival.

== 50 cc GP World Champions ==
Year	Champion	Country	Motorcycle	Second place	Country	Motorcycle	Third place	Country	Motorcycle
1962	Ernst Degner	Germany	Suzuki	Hans-Georg Anscheidt	Germany	Kreidler	Jan Huberts	Netherlands	Kreidler
1963	Hugh Anderson	New Zealand	Suzuki	Hans-Georg Anscheidt	Germany	Kreidler	Ernst Degner	East Germany	Suzuki
1964	Hugh Anderson	New Zealand	Suzuki	Ralph Bryans	Ireland	Honda	Hans-Georg Anscheidt	Germany	Kreidler
1965	Ralph Bryans	Ireland	Honda	Hugh Anderson	New Zealand	Suzuki	Luigi Taveri	Switzerland	Honda
1966	Hans-Georg Anscheidt	Germany	Suzuki	Ralph Bryans	Ireland	Honda	Luigi Taveri	Switzerland	Honda
1967	Hans-Georg Anscheidt	Germany	Suzuki	Yoshimi Katayama	Japan	Suzuki	Stuart Graham	United Kingdom	Suzuki
1968	Hans-Georg Anscheidt	Germany	Suzuki	Paul Lodewijkx	Netherlands	Jamathi	Barry Smith	Australia	Derbi
1969	Angel Nieto	Spain	Derbi	Aalt Toersen	Netherlands	Kreidler	Barry Smith	Australia	Derbi
1970	Angel Nieto	Spain	Derbi	Aalt Toersen	Netherlands	Jamathi	Rudolf Kunz	Germany	Kreidler
1971	Jan de Vries	Netherlands	Kreidler	Angel Nieto	Spain	Derbi	Jos Schurgers	Netherlands	Kreidler
1972	Angel Nieto	Spain	Derbi	Jan de Vries	Netherlands	Kreidler	Theo Timmer	Netherlands	Jamathi
1973	Jan de Vries	Netherlands	Kreidler	Bruno Kneubuhler	Switzerland	Kreidler	Theo Timmer	Netherlands	Jamathi
1974	Henk van Kessel	Netherlands	Kreidler	Herbert Rittberger	Germany	Kreidler	Julien van Zeebroeck	Belgium	Kreidler
1975	Angel Nieto	Spain	Kreidler	Eugenio Lazzarini	Italy	Piovatici	Julien van Zeebroeck	Belgium	Kreidler
1976	Angel Nieto	Spain	Bultaco	Herbert Rittberger	Germany	Kreidler	Ulrich Graf	Switzerland	Kreidler
1977	Angel Nieto	Spain	Bultaco	Eugenio Lazzarini	Italy	Kreidler	Ricardo Tormo	Spain	Bultaco
1978	Ricardo Tormo	Spain	Bultaco	Eugenio Lazzarini	Italy	Kreidler	Patrick Plisson	France	ABF
1979	Eugenio Lazzarini	Italy	Kreidler	Rolf Blatter	Switzerland	Kreidler	Patrick Plisson	France	ABF
1980	Eugenio Lazzarini	Italy	Kreidler	Stefan Dörflinger	Switzerland	Kreidler	Hans Hummel	Austria	Kreidler
1981	Ricardo Tormo	Spain	Bultaco	Theo Timmer	Netherlands	Bultaco	Stefan Dörflinger	Switzerland	Kreidler
1982	Stefan Dörflinger	Switzerland	Krauser	Eugenio Lazzarini	Italy	Garelli	Claudio Lusuardi	Italy	Villa
1983	Stefan Dörflinger	Switzerland	Kreidler	Eugenio Lazzarini	Italy	Garelli	Claudio Lusuardi	Italy	Villa
