= Mayasandra =

Village in Tumkur, Karnataka, India

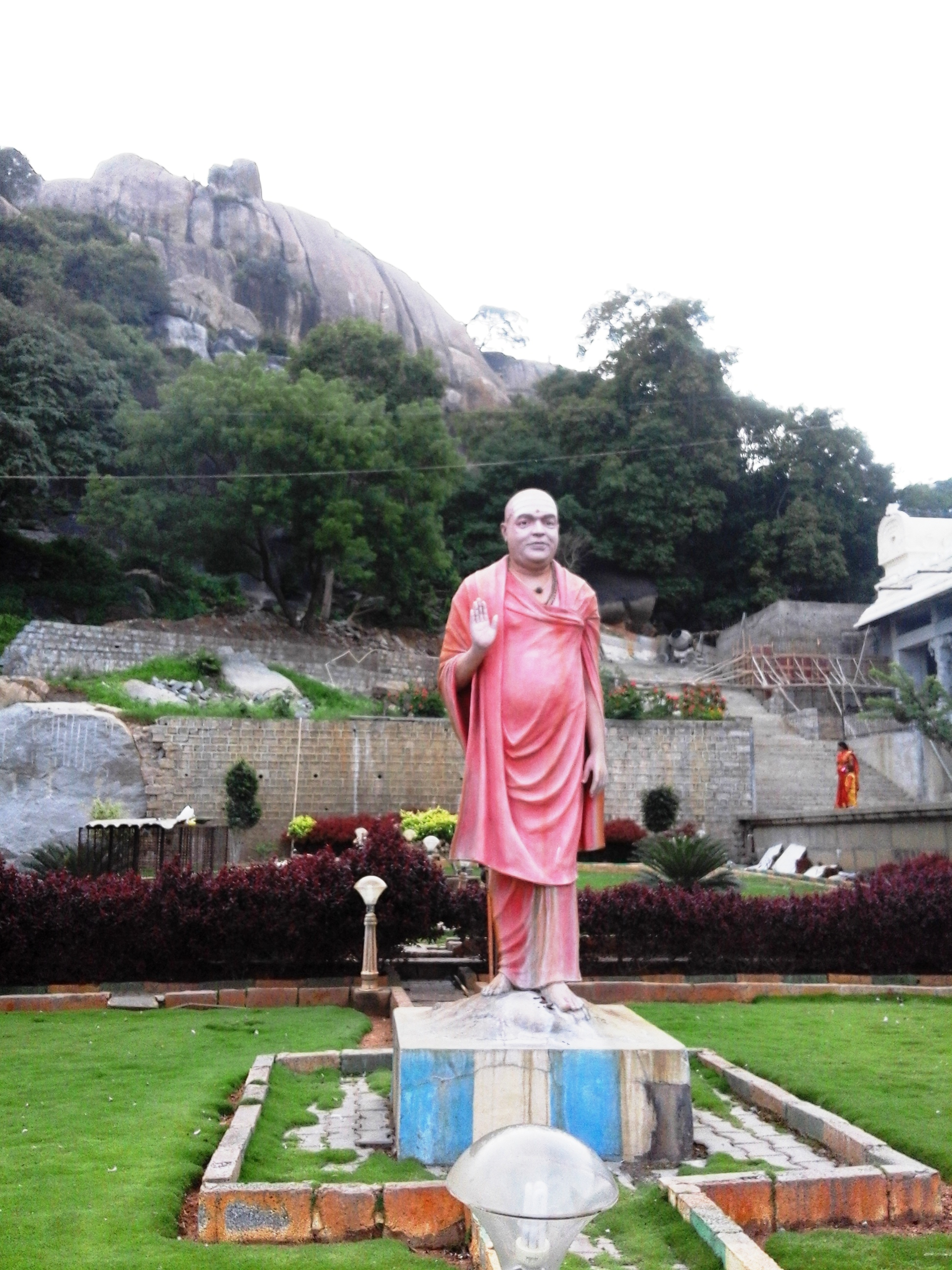
Adichunchagiri Hills

Mayasandra is a village in Turuvekere taluk in Tumkur District in Karnataka State in India. The place is one of the pancha-gramas (five settlements) of the Hebbar Shrivaishnavas
