= Belur =

Belur may refer to:

== Places ==
- Belur, Karnataka, a town in Karnataka, India
  - Belur temple (Chennakeshava temple), Belur
- Belur, Tamil Nadu, a town in Salem district, Tamil Nadu, India
- Belur, West Bengal, a neighbourhood of Howrah, India
  - Belur Math, the headquarters of the Ramakrishna Mission, located in Belur, West Bengal
  - Belur railway station

== People ==
- Belur Ravi
- Belur V. Dasarathy

== See also ==
- Beryl (disambiguation) and beryllium, named after Belur, Karnataka, India
- Velur (disambiguation)
