= Sigmar Berg =

Austrian fashion designer and photographer (born 1975)

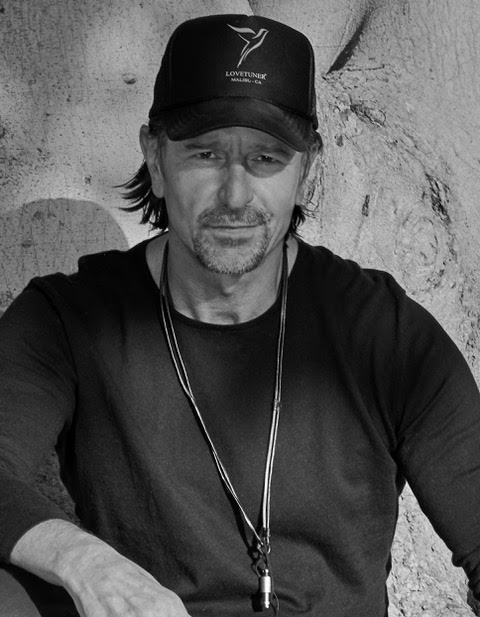
- Sigmar Berg
- Born: 1975 (age 50–51); Austria
- Occupations: Entrepreneur, photographer, artist, and designer
- Employer(s): Lovetuner, Inc.
- Known for: Founder of Lovetuner
- Title: CEO & Founder
- Website: https://www.lovetuner.com

Sigmar Berg (born 1975) is an American entrepreneur, artist, trained architect, photographer, and fashion designer. He is the founder of Beryll and Lovetuner.

== Early life and career ==
Berg was born in Austria. Although trained as an architect, he worked as a photographer in Europe, focusing on catalogs and commercial projects. He also pursued painting and fashion design. In 2006, Berg relocated to Los Angeles with his family, taking a break from his work as an abstract artist. His exhibit "Developed Views II" was featured at West Hollywood's Ambrogi-Castanier Gallery in June 2008 and was mentioned in the Los Angeles Times.

== Career ==
=== +Beryll ===
+Beryll is a brand founded by Berg in 2006 in Los Angeles, California, initially focusing on hand-made sunglasses. The brand later expanded to include a range of accessories, such as jewelry, handbags, boots, belts, hats, scarves, and leather vests, and other accessories. The designs reflect a blend of European influences, particularly the Bauhaus architectural style, and the fashion of Southern California. +Beryll products are available at a flagship store in Santa Monica, California and in over 500 other retail locations, including Barney's, Henri Bendel, Maxfield, and Fred Segal.

=== Lovetuner ===
In 2014, Berg introduced Lovetuner in Malibu, California. The Lovetuner is a small flute worn as a necklace and is calibrated to 528 Hz. Berg created the Lovetuner to contribute to wellness practices and to offer a tool for meditation and mindfulness.

The Lovetuner has garnered attention from several figures in the alternative medicine community, including endorsements from Deepak Chopra, Marla Maples, and filmmaker Barnet Bain. Additionally, actress Denise Richards mentioned Lovetuner as a personal favorite in 2020. In April 2021, BuzzFeed included Lovetuner as a recommended tool for managing anxiety.

=== The Lovetuner Foundation ===
Berg founded the Lovetuner Foundation, a nonprofit organization that promotes wellness and healing. The Foundation's initiatives include providing Lovetuner products to schools to help manage stress and anxiety, supporting veterans dealing with PTSD and suicide prevention, and sponsoring retreats for underprivileged children to help them overcome trauma, build unity, and promote healing.
