= Hugh George Egioke Savage =

Canadian politician

Hugh George Egioke Savage (1883 – 7 February 1957)) was an English-born journalist and political figure in British Columbia. He represented Cowichan-Newcastle in the Legislative Assembly of British Columbia from 1933 to 1937 as a member of the Oxford Group Movement.

== Background ==
Savage was born in Stratford-on-Avon and served in South Africa during the Second Boer War. He went to Canada in 1909 and was employed by the Vancouver Daily Province from 1910 to 1911. In January 1914, he was telegrammed by his former roommate and Province coworker Lukin Johnston asking him to take over Johnston's role as editor of the weekly Cowichan Leader, based in Duncan on Vancouver Island.

Savage represented Cowichan-Newcastle in the Legislative Assembly of British Columbia from 1933 to 1937 as a member of the Oxford Group Movement. He was defeated when he ran for re-election to the provincial assembly in 1937 as an independent. He never sought provincial office again. He died in Cobble Hill at the age of 74.

An award for small circulation weekly newspapers, the Hugh Savage Shield, was named in his honour.

== Election results ==
1933 British Columbia general election: Cowichan-Newcastle
Party	Candidate	Votes	%
Oxford Group	Hugh George Egioke Savage	1,655	40.88
Co-operative Commonwealth	Samuel Guthrie	1,288	31.82
Independent Conservative	Cyril Francis Davie	585	14.45
Liberal	David Ramsay	520	12.85
Total valid votes		4,048	100.00
Total rejected ballots		6	
Source(s) An Electoral History of British Columbia, 1871-1986 (PDF). Victoria: Elections British Columbia. 1988. p. 175. ISBN 0-7718-8677-2.

1937 British Columbia general election: Cowichan-Newcastle
Party	Candidate	Votes	%	±%
Co-operative Commonwealth	Samuel Guthrie	1,560	33.58	1.76
Liberal	Arnold Christmas Flett	1,224	26.35	13.50
Independent	Hugh George Egioke Savage	1,222	26.31	-14.57
Conservative	Clement Pemberton Deykin	639	13.76	Returned
Total valid votes		4,645	100.00	
Total rejected ballots		42	0.90	
Source(s) An Electoral History of British Columbia, 1871-1986 (PDF). Victoria: Elections British Columbia. 1988. p. 185. ISBN 0-7718-8677-2.
