= Burling =

Burling is a surname.

It may refer to:

- Albert E. Burling (1891–1960), American justice of the New Jersey state supreme court
- Bobby Burling (born 1984), American soccer player
- Carroll Burling (born 1934), American politician from Nebraska
- Daniel Burling (born 1947), American politician from New York
- Edward J. Burling (1819–1892), American architect from New York
- Edward B. Burling (1871–1966), American lawyer
- George C. Burling (1834–1885), U.S. Union Army officer during the American Civil War
- George T. Burling (1849–1928), American banker and politician from New York
- Henry Burling (1801–1911), New Zealand pioneer settler and mailman
- Paul Burling (born 1970), British impressionist
- Peter Burling (politician) (born 1945), American politician from Washington, D.C.
- Peter Burling (sailor) (born 1991), New Zealand Olympic sailor
- Robbins Burling (1926–2021), American professor of anthropology and linguistics

== Other uses ==
Burling, a skill developed by lumberjacks, also called log rolling

== See also ==
- Beurling
