= Berle (surname) =

Berle is a surname. Notable people with the surname include:

- Adolf A. Berle (1895–1971), American educator and diplomat
- Jon Berle (1932–2010), Norwegian actor, dancer, and choreographer
- Milton Berle (1908–2002), American comedian and actor
- Peter A. A. Berle (1937–2007), American lawyer and politician

== See also ==
- Berl (name)
- Emmanuel Berl (1892–1976), French journalist, historian, and essayist
- Lucy Burle (born 1955), Brazilian international freestyle and butterfly swimmer
