= HMAS Beryl II =

Australian minesweeper

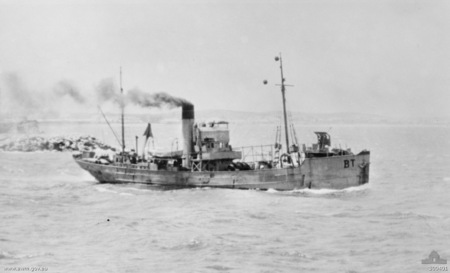
- HMAS Beryl II

History

Australia
- Name: Beryl II
- Launched: 15 November 1913

History

Australia
- Name: Beryl II
- Commissioned: 9 October 1939
- Decommissioned: 13 December 1945

General characteristics
- Tonnage: 248 gross register tonnage
- Length: 122 ft (37 m)
- Beam: 22 ft (7 m)
- Depth: 12 ft (4 m)
- Armament: 1 × 12-pounder gun; 1 × 20mm Oerlikon cannon; 1 x 76mm QF HA/LA gun; 1 × .303-inch Vickers machine gun

HMAS Beryl II (F. 71/BT) was an auxiliary minesweeper, later boom gate vessel, operated by the Royal Australian Navy (RAN) during World War II. She was launched in 1914 by Cochrane & Sons at Selby. The ship operated as a trawler and was requisitioned by the RAN in 1939. She was returned to her owners on 24 May 1946 and was later scrapped in 1955.

== Operating history ==
Built in 1914, she was operated by the Three White Crowns Company, Hull in the North Sea. In 1926 she was purchased by Cam and Sons and after a voyage of 66 days arrived at Sydney. She was requisitioned by the RAN on 7 September 1939, and after being fitted out at Williamstown, was commissioned on 9 October. Beryl II served with Minesweeping Group 54 in Port Phillip Bay until February 1943.

She was then transferred to Minesweeping Group 63 at Port Adelaide and served until December 1943. She was sent to Sydney to be converted into a boom gate vessel and was sent to Port Moresby, New Guinea, where she remained until April 1945. Beryl II was refitted in Melbourne between May and November. She was placed into reserve in Sydney and was decommissioned on 13 December.

She was returned to her owners on 24 May 1946 and resumed trawling. While trawling off Kiama on 23 April 1947 she was struck by lightning and damaged. She was scrapped in 1955.
