= Beryl Rowland =

Scottish-Canadian literature scholar

Beryl Winnifred Rowland (April 10, 1918 - April 24, 2003) was a Scottish-Canadian literature scholar, especially of Chaucer, having been Distinguished Research Professor at York University in Toronto. She was the first woman doctoral graduate in English at the University of British Columbia, and an honorary doctorate of Mount Saint Vincent University in Halifax, Nova Scotia. She was especially interested in symbolism in literature. After retirement, she and her husband, Dr. Murray Rowland, a physician, moved to Victoria, British Columbia, where Rowland, widowed, died.

== Selected publications ==
- Rowland, Beryl, ed. (1974). Chaucer and Middle English Studies in Honour of Rossell Hope Robbins. London: George Allen & Unwin. doi:10.4324/9780429341786. ISBN 0-04-821030-7.
