= Pierrot Vervroegen =

Belgian motorcycle racer

- Nationality: (Belgium) Belgian
Motorcycle racing career statistics
Grand Prix motorcycle racing
Active years	1961 – 1962
First race	1961 125cc Belgian Grand Prix
Last race	1962 250cc Belgian Grand Prix
Championships	0
Starts / Wins / Podiums / Poles / F. laps / Points; 3 / 0 / 0 / 0 / 0 / 1

Pierrot Vervroegen (born in Belgium) was a Belgian Grand Prix motorcycle road racer. He was a regular front runner in the Belgian motorcycle Championships and won the national 250cc title in 1959 riding a MOTOBI Catria Sport. In 1961, he won the first round of the FIM's 50cc Coupe d'Europe riding an Itom. He entered four world championship Grand Prix's in 1955, 1960, 1961 and 1962, and gained a single World Championship point in the 1962 250cc World Championship.
