= Beryl Shereshewsky =

American YouTuber, filmmaker and video producer

YouTube information
- Channel: Beryl Shereshewsky
- Years active: 2020-present
- Genres: Food and cooking
- Subscribers: 861 thousand
- Views: 226.9 million
- Last updated: Nov 3, 2026

Beryl Shereshewsky is an American YouTuber, filmmaker, and video producer, who formerly worked for Great Big Story. Shereshewsky makes food videos showcasing global cuisine on her eponymous YouTube channel.

== Career ==
Shereshewsky worked for Great Big Story, a "micro-documentary" platform owned by CNN, eventually as a Series Developer often showcasing food-related stories. She launched her eponymous YouTube channel, on which she cooks food from around the world in her New York City kitchen, in 2020 after Great Big Story shut down.

== Personal life ==
Shereshewsky lives in Murray Hill, New York City with her husband, Rajat Mehrotra. In November of 2025, she announced via Instagram that they are expecting twins in February of 2026.
