= Beurling =

Beurling is a surname. Notable people with the surname include:

- Arne Beurling (1905–1986), Swedish mathematician
- Elizabeth F. Beurling, fictional character in Japanese-origin anime/manga series Strike Witches
- George Beurling (1921–1948), Canadian fighter pilot

== Toponyms ==
- Rivière Beurling (Beurling River) is a tributary of the Caniapiscau River (watershed of Ungava Bay), in the unorganized territory of Rivière-Koksoak, Quebec, Canada.
