= The Province =

Canadian daily newspaper in British Columbia

- It Starts Here.

- Type: Daily newspaper
- Format: Tabloid
- Owner: Postmedia Network
- Editor: Harold Munro
- Founded: 1898
- Language: English
- Headquarters: 400-2985 Virtual Way; Vancouver, British Columbia; V5M 4X7
- ISSN: 0839-3311
- Website: theprovince.com

The Province is a daily newspaper published in tabloid format in British Columbia by Pacific Newspaper Group, a division of Postmedia Network, alongside the Vancouver Sun broadsheet newspaper. Together, they are British Columbia's only two major newspapers.

Formerly a broadsheet, The Province later became tabloid paper-size. It publishes daily except Saturdays, Mondays (as of October 17, 2022) and selected holidays.

== History ==
The Province was established as a weekly newspaper in Victoria in 1894. A 1903 article in the Pacific Monthly described the Province as the largest and the youngest of Vancouver's important newspapers.

In 1923, the Southam family bought The Province. By 1945, the paper's printers went out on strike. The Province had been the best selling newspaper in Vancouver, ahead of the Vancouver Sun and News Herald. As a result of the six-week strike, it lost significant market share, at one point falling to third place. In 1957, The Province and the Vancouver Sun were sold to Pacific Press Limited which was jointly owned by both newspaper companies.

A 1970 strike by Pacific Press employees shut down the Sun and Province for three months; in the interim, the Vancouver Express published daily editions. It ended on May 13 and resulted in increased pay for employees and a trustee pension fund with a board that included management and union representatives.

== Circulation ==
The Province has seen, like most Canadian daily newspapers, a decline in circulation. Its total circulation dropped by 30 percent to 114,467 copies daily from 2009 to 2015.

Daily average

== Notable journalists ==
- Kim Bolan
- Al Beaton (editorial cartoonist)
- Jim Coleman
- Lukin Johnston
- Hugh George Egioke Savage
- Tony Gallagher

== CFCB/CKCD radio station ==
At 2 p.m. on March 23, 1922, the Province launched radio station CFCB, with news and stock market reports. There were news bulletins throughout the day, followed by music. Sign off was at 10 p.m. The station's name changed to CKCD in 1923 and it moved to 730 kHz in 1925. In 1933 the paper turned its operations over to the Pacific Broadcasting Co., while continuing to supply news reports to the station.

In 1936, the newly formed Canadian Broadcasting Corporation, established to function as both broadcaster and broadcasting regulator (taking over the latter function from previous regulator the Department of Marine and Fisheries), asked CKCD to relinquish its licence, and the station signed off for the last time in February 1940.

== See also ==
- Hewitt Bostock
- List of newspapers in Canada
- Wait for Me, Daddy, 1940 photograph
- Media in Vancouver
