= Nizami Bandhu =

Indian band

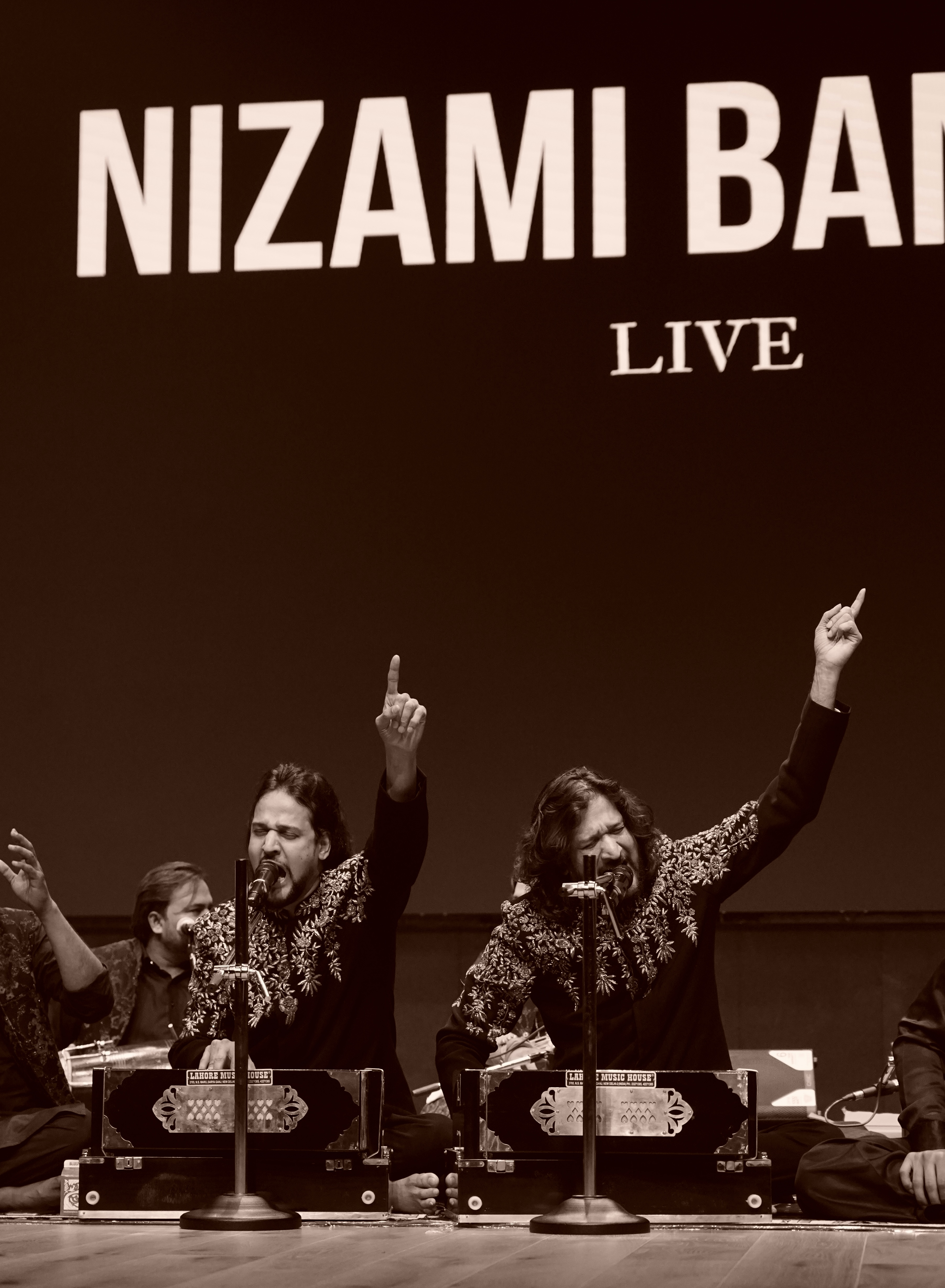
- Nizami Bandhu; Right to Left: Sohrab Faridi Nizami and Shadab Faridi Nizami

Background information
- Origin: Nizamuddin Dargah, Delhi, India
- Genres: Sufi, Qawwali, Bollywood
- Instruments: Harmonium, Tabla, Dholak, Keyboard
- Members: Shadab Faridi Nizami, Sohrab Faridi Nizami
- Past members: Mehmood Nizami, Ghulam Farid Nizami, Mushtaq Khan
- Website: nizamibandhu.com

Nizami Bandhu (Hindi: निज़ामी बंधु, Urdu: نظامی بندھو) are an Indian musical group composed of Shadab Faridi and Sohrab Faridi Nizami.

The group is widely known for their performances at hazrat nizamuddin dargah, scheduled to be performed on every thursday.

They perform Qawaali written by the poet Amir Khusro in honour of Nizamuddin Auliya.

== Discography ==
Selected Discography
Year	Song	Album/Film
2005	Kahoon Kaise Sakhi	Yahaan
2005	Ajmer Wale Khwaja	Yahaan
2011	Kun Faya Kun	Rockstar
2015	Aaj Rang Hai	Bajrangi Bhaijaan
2021	Khawaja Mere Khwaja (Live)	Single

== Filmography ==
The band gained fame after being featured in the song Kun Faaya Kun directed by music director and composer A R Rahman from movie Rockstar in 2011. Following that the band has sung and featured in the movie Bajrangi Bhaijaan wherein the band is seen performing at Hazrat Nizamuddin Dargah.

== History ==
The families of the group members have sung at Indian shrines for centuries. In the Nineteenth century the families expanded their performances to events such as weddings, private mehfils, and movies.

In 2011, the current group appeared in the song Kun Fayakun in the film Rockstar, performing at the Nizamuddin Dargah, along with actor Ranbir Kapoor. In 2015 they appeared in the movie Bajrangi Bhaijaan which was directed by Kabir Khan, and performed the song "Aaj Rang Hai" which was written by poet Amir Khusro.

== Past qawwals in this tradition ==
1. Aashaq Khan from the year 1865 to 1946.

2. Mushtaq Khan Nizami from the year 1887 to 1965.

3. Mahmood Nizami from the year 1909 to 1992.

4. Ghulam Farid Nizami from the year 1965 to 2003.
