= Dakota Burl =

Composite wood

Dakota Burl is a sustainable composite wood composed of a soy-based resin and discarded sunflower shells. The striated pattern of the sunflower seed hulls gives the material a speckled appearance. The material is typically manufactured in panels and used as a reclaimed alternative to hardwoods.
