= Beryl Tsang =

Canadian fibre artist

Beryl Tsang is a Canadian fibre artist and founder of Tits-Bits: Hand Knitted Breasts. She is original creator of the knitted breast prosthetic.

== Origin ==
In response to her own mastectomy following breast cancer and disappointment with commercially available prostheses, she knit one.

Seeking a prosthetic to fit an outfit for a party, she purchased a traditional silicone one and a specialised mastectomy bra. She found it to be inelegant for her evening dress and uncomfortable to wear. As an avid knitter, she knit herself one that addressed the heavy weight issue of silicone, could be worn with normal bras, and whose shape appeared more pleasing and natural under clothing.

Tit-Bits provide an alternative to the sometimes demoralizing experience of remedying the loss of a breast. They are also more economical than the cost of a traditional prosthesis, can be made in materials that feel more comfortable against the skin, and as a health benefit, do not irritate the mastectomy scar.

Beryl Tsang has participated in WIAprojects, a feminist arts-informed research and practice program at the University of Toronto, Centre for Women's Studies in Education. Her creation has also been studied as a mode for feminist action.

== Press ==
Tsang received much press coverage for her creation:

- Utne Reader
- Canadian Living
- Dame Magazine
- Minnesota Women's Press
- Vermont Journal
