= Barile (disambiguation) =

Barile may refer to:

- Barile, a town and comune in the province of Potenza, Italy
- Al Barile, American songwriter/guitarist and co-founder of SSD (Society System Decontrol), a Boston-based band
- Albert Barillé (1920–2009), French television producer, creator, screenwriter, cartoonist, and founder of Procidis
- Xavier J. Barile (1891–1981), Italian-born American artist
