= +Beryll =

California-based luxury accessory company

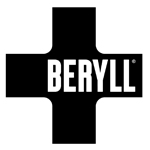
- Type: Private
- Industry: Luxury fashion
- Founded: Malibu, California, United States (2006)
- Founder: Sigmar Berg
- Key people: Petra Berg; Chief Designer
- Products: Cashmere apparel, silk apparel, knitwear, outerwear
- Website: beryll.com

+Beryll is a Los Angeles based luxury fashion brand specializing in luxury cashmere and silk apparel. The brand was originally established as an eyewear label before evolving into a luxury clothing brand under the leadership of designer Petra Berg, who relaunched the company 2021. Today, +Beryll focuses on timeless collections of knitwear, outerwear, and silk apparel.

== History ==
+Beryll was founded in Los Angeles in 2006 by Austrian-born designer Sigmar Berg.

Petra Berg joined +Beryll in 2007 and became the company's owner and creative leader in 2021. Under her direction, the brand shifted its focus from luxury eyewear to ready-to-wear collections centered on cashmere, silk, and timeless wardrobe essentials. The collections are designed in Los Angeles and reflect Berg's European heritage and minimalist design philosophy.

Prior to its relaunch as a luxury ready-to-wear brand, +Beryll was recognized for its handcrafted eyewear collections. During this period, the brand's sunglasses were worn by celebrities like Angelina Jolie, Brad Pitt, David LaChapelle, Drew Barrymore, Lenny Kravitz, Katie Holmes, Kevin Dillon, Steven Tyler, Robert De Niro, Kim Basinger, Nicolas Cage and others. Kristin Cavallari wore the Beryll "Air" sunglasses on The Hills Season 6 Ep.1. Other sunglasses have been worn by Sarah Jessica Parker, Anna Pacquin, Sharon Stone, and Demi Moore.

== Collections ==
Today, +Beryll produces luxury ready-to-wear collections focused on cashmere, knitwear, silk apparel, tailored outerwear, and seasonal capsule collections. The brand emphasizes timeless design, natural materials, and European-inspired craftsmanship.
