= Berel Lang =

American philosopher (1933–2025)

Berel Lang (November 13, 1933 – September 8, 2025) was an American professor of philosophy and author. His research interests included political philosophy, ethics, aesthetics, literary theory. A considerable amount of his work was devoted to The Holocaust.

== Life and career ==
Born in Norwich, Connecticut, he earned his B.A. from Yale University (1954) and his Ph.D. in philosophy from Columbia University (1961, thesis: The Cognitive Significance of Art); he took additional studies at Indiana University and the Hebrew University of Jerusalem.

Lang was a professor of philosophy at the University of Colorado from 1961 to 1983 and at the State University of New York at Albany from 1983 to 1997. In 1997 he became professor of humanities at Trinity College (Connecticut). He also was visiting professor in several other universities.

Lang died on September 8, 2025, at the age of 91.

== Books ==
- 1975: Art and Inquiry
- 1983: Philosophy and the Art of Writing
- 1983: Faces and Other Ironies of Writing and Reading
- 1990: Act and Idea in the Nazi Genocide
- 1990: The Anatomy of Philosophical Style: Literary Philosophy and the Philosophy of Literature
- 1991: Writing and the Moral Self
- 1995: Mind's Bodies: Thought in the Act
- 1996: Heidegger's Silence
- 1999: The Future of the Holocaust: Between History and Memory
- 2000: Holocaust Representation: Art within the Limits of History and Ethics
- 2005: Post-Holocaust: Interpretation, Misinterpretation, and the Claims of History, essays
- 2012: Philosophical Witnessing: The Holocaust as Presence
- 2013: Primo Levi: The Matter of a Life
- 2017: Genocide: The Act as Idea
