= Lukin Johnston =

Canadian journalist

- Born: Edwyn Harry Lukin Johnston; August 8, 1887; Surbiton, Surrey, England
- Died: November 18, 1933 (aged 46) the English Channel
- Citizenship: Canadian
- Occupations: Journalist, Author, Soldier
- Spouse: Bertha Court
- Children: Derek Robert Lukin Johnston
- Relatives: Major General Sir Henry Timson Lukin (great-uncle)
- Writing career
- Years active: 1909-1933

Edwyn Harry Lukin Johnston (August 8, 1887 - November 18, 1933) was an English-Canadian journalist, author, and soldier whose mysterious disappearance, three days after interviewing Adolf Hitler, is speculated to be a possible assassination and "one of the most enduring mysteries of Canadian journalism."

== Early life ==
Johnston was born in Surbiton, Surrey, England in 1887 as the second son of a Church of England clergyman, Rector Reverend Robert E. Johnston. His mother Ellen Jane Lukin Johnston (d. 1903) was the daughter of a London Inner Court barrister and the niece of the adventure-seeking Major General Sir Henry Timson Lukin. Johnston's father wrote a biography of Johnston's great-uncle in 1929 titled Ulundi to Delville Wood: The life story of Major-General Sir Henry Timson Lukin, K.C.B., C.M.B., D.S.O., Chevalier Legion dhÌ"onneur, Order of the Nile.

Johnston was educated at The King's School, Canterbury. In November 1905 at age 18, Johnston travelled alone aboard the CPR vessel Lake Manitoba from Liverpool to Montreal with just 10 sovereign coins. He worked on farms near Burford, Ontario and in the Qu'Appelle Valley, Saskatchewan before moving to the Kootenays region of British Columbia.

== Start of journalism career ==
In March 1909, with no journalism experience, Johnston was hired as a reporter by The Province newspaper in Vancouver, British Columbia. He spent his savings of $20 to do research on real estate for his first article. He shared an apartment with fellow reporters Hugh Savage and Kenneth Meyers.

In August 1911, at age 24, Johnston moved to Duncan on Vancouver Island to edit the weekly newspaper Cowichan Leader. In less than three years, the Leader expanded from 4 to 10 pages, including a prominent editorial page. The pre-incorporated city grew significantly during his time there, including opening of the Malahat Highway connecting Duncan to the City of Victoria. Johnston touted the area's growth: "Duncan in the late summer of 1911 was...beautiful...it was prosperous, it was gay. In short it was one of the most delightful residential districts to be found anywhere -- a district unique in all Canada."

In January 1914, he moved to the provincial capital to become city editor and write about politics for the daily newspaper Victoria Colonist even though he had earlier described the newspaper's editor, Charles Lugrin, as "one of the worst rogues unhung."

Johnston telegrammed his former coworker/roommate Hugh Savage to replace himself as editor of the Cowichan Leader. Johnston's departure from Duncan may have been due to his strong opinions. Johnston's editorializing against a government subsidy to improve public roads to Lake Cowichan had aroused the ire of some wealthy landowners and businessmen who stood to gain by improved access.

== The Great War ==
In November 1915, Johnston enlisted with the 88th Battalion (Victoria Fusiliers), CEF of the Canadian Expeditionary Force along with 1,150 Victorians. After being sent to Europe in 1916, Johnston fought at Vimy Ridge in April 1917, Passchendaele in November 1917, Amien in August 1918 and was mentioned in dispatches January 1, 1919. His Victoria relationship with General Sir Arthur Currie may have helped his promotion to be an officer. He was honourably discharged with the rank of Major. His younger brother, J.L. Lukin Johnston, had enlisted at Duncan into the 30th Battalion, was promoted to captain, and was killed in battles in France.

== Return to journalism ==
In 1919, Johnston returned to The Province newspaper to work at the ‘telegraph’ desk (news wire service). In 1921 he became the first President of the B.C. Institute of Journalists and later President of the local St. George Society. He was also made a Fellow of the Royal Geographical Society.

Notable interviewees included:

- Paul Painlevé - former Prime Minister of France
- William Howard Taft - former President of the United States
- Elsie Ferguson - American stage and screen actress
- Samuel Gompers - American labour leader

In July 1923, after initially being denied access to American President Warren G. Harding's trip to Alaska, Johnston was smuggled on board the ship in Portland, Oregon by American journalists. His charming nature warmed Harding to give interviews. Johnston's coverage of Harding's sailing was published in The Province prior to Harding's popular visit to the City of Vancouver, a week prior to Harding's death in San Francisco. His scrapbook and photos for the Harding interview were donated by his family in 1981 to the City of Vancouver archives.

He was a friend and coworker of several notable journalists, including Bruce Hutchison. In 1925, The Province made Johnston the first editor of the paper's new populist family-oriented weekly Magazine Section.

Johnston expanded his coverage of politics to international affairs and also wrote about his journeys throughout British Columbia's rural areas. In May 1928 he was appointed the chief correspondent in Europe for the Canadian Southam News agency and established a working relationship with The Times of London. In 1929 he published Beyond the Rockies: 3000 Miles by trail and canoe through little known British Columbia.

A contemporary Canadian journalist best summarized Johnston's impact on Canadian news services in the 1930s. "[H]e established himself as a brilliant and reliable interpreter for Canadian readers of British events and political developments. His cables from London to the Vancouver Province and Associated Southam Newspapers throughout Canada were the most eagerly read of any despatches from the Old Country." His articles about the English countryside that appealed to English emigrants were published in books In England Today (1931) and Down English Lanes (1933).

== Nazi Germany ==
In 1931, Johnston met with Ernst Hanfstaengl, head of the Foreign Press section of the Propaganda Ministry of the Weimar Republic. Johnston reunited with Robert Keyserlingk, a friend from Vancouver who was now working at the United Press in Zurich and had scored an exclusive interview with Adolf Hitler. En route to the 1932 Lausanne Disarmament Conference, Johnston used Keyserlingk to arrange and translate an interview with His Highness Victor Salvator Prince Isenburg, special representative of the Czech Skoda munition works.

In 1932, he failed in attempts to interview Hitler in Munich. He did file reports of his impressions of the party's headquarters: "They raised the right hand and said ‘Heil Hitler’ ... the whole atmosphere of the place seemed to me like that just before the curtain goes up on an amateur theatrical show." In the following year, he interviewed a social democrat jailed in Lichtenburg concentration camp alongside 1,600 political dissidents and refused to permit the German government to vet his articles.

Ten days before Hitler's election win, Johnston wrote:

"Never in history has propaganda been mobilized on such a vast scale or with such crushing efficiency to bend the will of a nation ... opposition parties have ceased to exist, and the watchful eyes of the storm troopers will check voters in thousands of small electoral districts."

On November 12, 1933, Hitler was elected as Chancellor. Interviews with foreign journalists were rare and state-managed. On November 15, 1933, Johnston became the first Canadian newspaperman to be granted an interview with Hitler. Johnston telephoned in his story that was headlined by the Province as "Germany Ready To Reduce Arms Claims Hitler. German Chancellor Makes Unequivocal Declaration to The Province Correspondent In Exclusive Interview."

Johnston reported that Hitler "unequivocally declared that Germany is ready to consider any invitation to recommence negotiations for disarmament or the limitation of armaments so long as she [Germany] was invited on terms of absolute equality." Johnston asked if Germany should make the next move toward disarmament. Hitler responded with the rationale that "…the initiative should come from those states which have not disarmed. Germany after all can not disarm because she has disarmed already."

Johnston told other foreign correspondents that while exiting from the interview, Johnston encountered Goering who aggressively leaned towards him and said in English, ‘You’re damned lucky to get out.'

== Disappearance ==
Johnston boarded the ferry boat Prague at the Hook of Holland to travel to Harwich, England. At 2:30 a.m. Saturday Nov. 18th, a seaman noted the well-dressed gentleman asleep on deck. When the ferry docked at the English quay in the morning, Mr. Johnston was not to be found. There was speculation that the healthy 46-year-old may have had a heart attack and fallen into the sea. His disappearance was featured in a number of newspapers, generating 700 letters from readers to Johnston's widow.

Six months prior to Johnston’s disappearance, Captain Cecil Brooks of the P&O steamship line had vanished in a similar way while aboard a ferry to Harwich while returning from an important company mission on the continent.

== Rufus ==
In 2014, Kelowna-based author Colin Castle, a retired teacher who is married to Johnston’s granddaughter Val, published Rufus': The Life of the Canadian Journalist Who Interviewed Hitler, a biography titled with Johnston's childhood nickname, that asserts the Nazis had reasons to want Johnston to disappear. There seem to be three possibilities for how he disappeared off the ferry: fell, jumped or was pushed. The book cited Johnston's history of seafaring as reducing the likelihood of seasickness or accidental falling off the ship. Castle asserts it was "cold-blooded murder" by a minion of Goering. Castle suggested that the Germans may have suspected Johnston was going to write a book critical of the German government and its interests in aggression versus Poland.

== Authored books ==
- 1929 - Beyond the Rockies
- 1931 - In England Today
- 1933 - Down English Lanes
