= Itom =

Historical motorcycle manufacturer

Itom (acronym for Industria Torinese Meccanica) was a motorcycle factory founded in Turin (in Via Millio, at number 41), in 1944, and transferred to Sant'Ambrogio di Torino in 1957/58 where it produced motorcycles until the close of 1975. The owner was the lawyer Corrado Corradi.

== History ==
The Itom company began with an association with the bicycle manufacturer Benotto, and started production with a motorised bicycle model called SIRIO, using engines from Officine Meccanica Broglia (OMB), also based in Turin. Soon after, the young engineer Giuseppe Spotto arrived from Sicily. He had been an airplane pilot in the Second World War, and together with Silvano Bonetto, he began to design new engines to be applied to bicycles first mounted on the fork then behind the saddle and finally (beginning with the famous TOURIST model) to be placed between the pedals. In 1953 the Esperia model was launched with a monocoque structure, followed in 1954 by the ASTOR and ASTOR Sport models with 2 and 3 hand-operated gears, and in 1957 the ASTOR Sport Competizione. Finally 1959 saw the launch of the 65 cc TABOR model with 4 gears, first manually operated and then with a pedal preselector positioned under the engine.

At the end of the 1950s, ITOM became IMSA (Industria Meccanica Sant'Ambrogio) having moved in 1957/58 to the factory of the former Maglificio Fratelli Bosio in Sant'Ambrogio di Torino in the Susa Valley, strengthening the production of motorcycles. In 1960 the ITOM Junior model was released, and in 1965 what became the most famous ITOM model was launched: the ASTOR Sport with 4-speed pedal gearbox, in this period with the well-known Yellow / White or Red / White livery. In 1969 the SIRIO Cross was launched, and in 1970 a new version of the ASTOR. In 1973 in-house production of engines stopped, and the ITOM models were equipped with engines by Moto Morini. In the same year, a Cross Competition model with a Zündapp engine was presented at the Milan Motor Show.

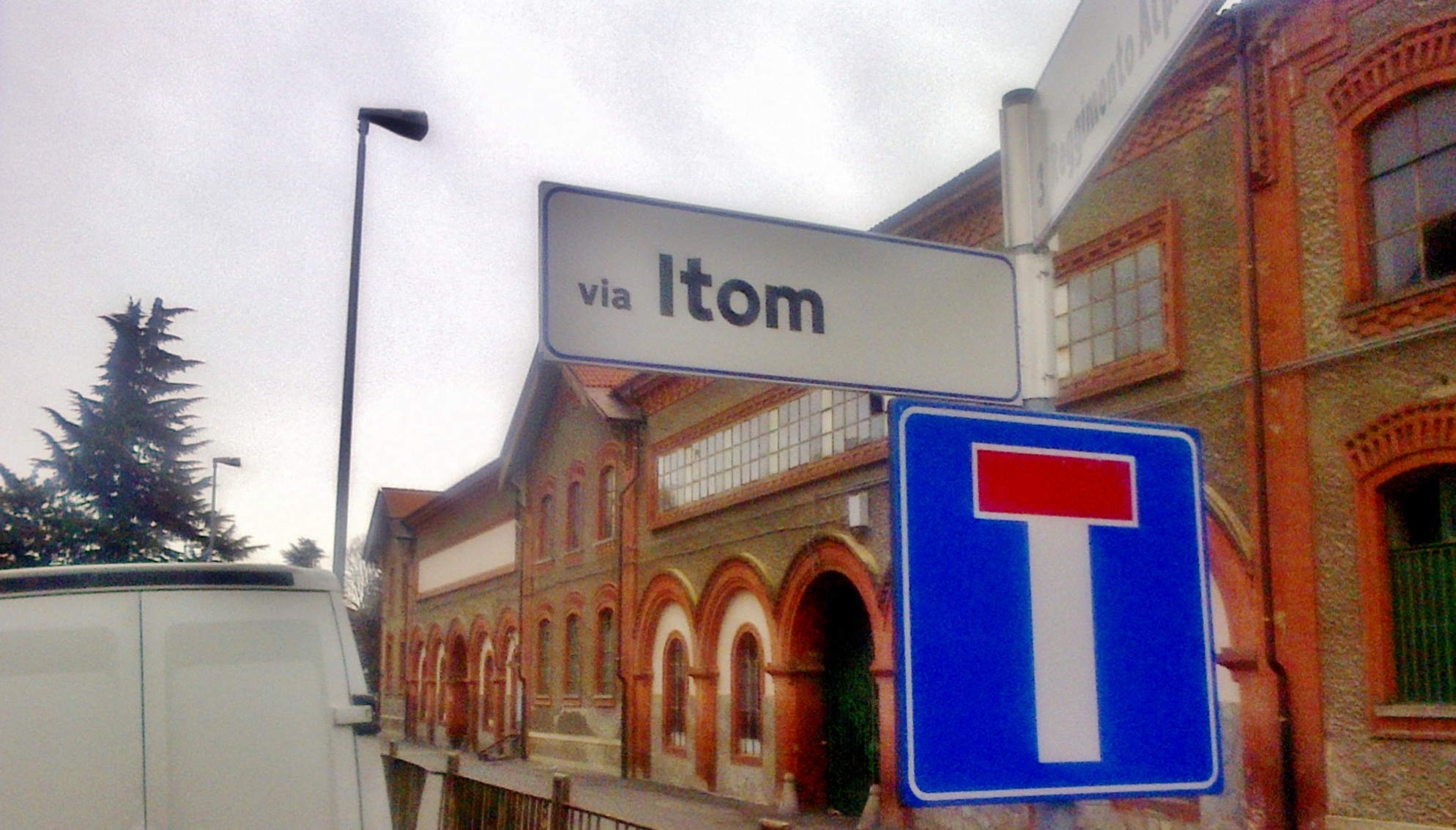
Via Itom, S.Ambrogio di Torino

ITOM also built air compressors. These operated on an innovative system, using not piston-based but rotary compressors, which was very innovative for the time. ITOM also built a three-wheeler motortricycle based on the structure of ordinary production motorcycles.

In 1965, about 130 people worked in ITOM. On the evening of 26 August 1965, a sudden fire broke out in the attic and destroyed the roof of the factory, causing extensive damage both to equipment and to products already completed.

In 1975 production ended at the Sant'Ambrogio di Torino plant.

In 2010 the road leading to the former factory in Sant'Ambrogio di Torino was named after the enterprise, with the name of "Via Itom".

== Models ==
Production was initially limited to auxiliary engines to be applied to bicycles, then to mopeds entirely of their own production, including the engine; this latter fact distinguishes it from the majority of contemporary Italian makers who used engines produced by the specialized houses of Minarelli and Franco Morini.

ITOM production remained limited to mopeds, with the exceptions only, in the sector of larger models registered as motorcycles, of the Tabor, a 65 cm^{3} model derived from the various 50 cm^{3} models, and two models of off-road motorcycles. These latter were presented at the Milan EICMA international cycle and motorcycle exhibition in 1973: a motocross model called 'Gringo' with a 5-speed Zündapp 125 power unit and an 'Enduro' model powered by a Minarelli 125 engine with 5-speed gearbox. The Itom 125 did not have much luck and only a few units were sold. The 50 cm^{3} production ranged from single-speed models to two-speed, three-speed and even four-speed sports models, the latter being produced in both Sport / Competition and MotoCross / Regularity versions.

=== ITOM Models (1948–1975) ===
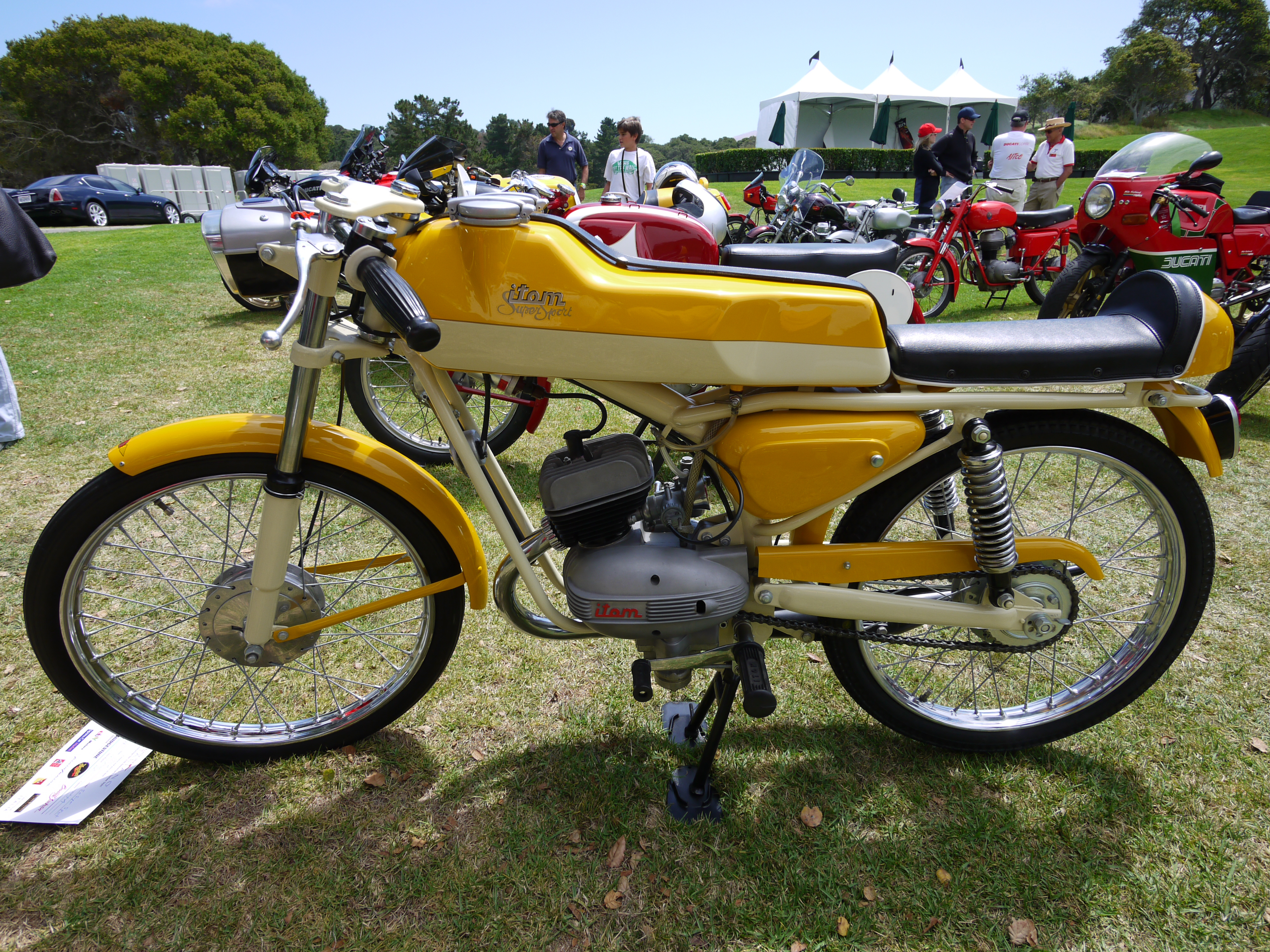
Itom 50 Supersport

Model name	Capacity	Produced from	until
49,5 Sirio	(49.5 cc)	1948	
48 Alba	(48 cc)	1948	
49,5 Tourist	(49.5 cc)	1949	
48 Sport	(48 cc)	1950	
48 Sprint	(48 cc)	1951	
49,5 Astor Trial	(49.5 cc)	1953	
48 Esperia	(48 cc)	1953	
48 Unim	(48 cc)	1953	
48 Ideal	(48 cc)	1954	
48 Minitom	(48 cc)	1956	
49,5 Astor Super	(49.5 cc)	1957	
49,5 Astor	(49.5 cc)	1959	
48 Junior	(48 cc)	1960	
49,5 Astor Competizione	(49.5 cc)	1960	
48 Esperia 32	(48 cc)	1963	
48 Esperia 36	(48 cc)	1964	
49,5 Special	(49.5 cc)	1964	
49,5 Astor Super Sport	(49.5 cc)	1965	
49,5 Fuori Strada	(49.5 cc)	1968	
49,5 Sirio Cross	(49.5 cc)	1969	
125 Gringo	(125 cc)	1973	
125 Enduro	(125 cc)	1974	

== Competitions ==
From 1950 to 1969 ITOM participated in national and international motorsport competitions.

The most famous model of ITOM remains the Astor, a model that in its highest performing versions was widely used in competitions, both by many private riders and by various trainers and also by ITOM itself, with participation at national level (gaining the title of Campione Italiano della Montagna 1966 by Sergio Bongiovanni, official driver of the House, who in 1964 and 1965 had placed second in the championship, and who was subsequently replaced by Domenico De Giorgi). There was also sporadic participation in the Class 50 World Championship by private teams (famously in England that of the Tooleys dealership) and others in Holland, France, Belgium and Germany. Several riders who later became World Champions began their racing activities on the Itom Astor: Mike Hailwood, Bill Ivy, Dave Simmonds and Jean-Pierre Beltoise the Formula 1 driver.

In 1962 English rider Beryl Swain participated in the Tourist Trophy on an Itom, becoming the first woman to participate (and to place) in the Isle of Man competitions.

On 21 May 1961 at the Clermont-Ferrand circuit, as part of the 1961 French motorcycle Grand Prix (third round of the 1961 world championship), a national race took place reserved for the 50cc class, won by Jean-Claude Serre on an Itom. In 1961 the Belgian driver Pierrot Vervroegen finished in 3rd place in the F.I.M. of the 50cc Class on an Itom, with other Itoms in that 8-race championship finishing in 8th, 10th, 19th, 20th, 22nd and 24th places.

== ITOM Meetings ==
As for most historic brands of motorcycles, scooters and not only for ITOM motorcycles, events bringing together enthusiasts of the marque are held in different parts of Europe. On 29 September 2019 the first edition of the "ITOM at Home" event was held in Sant'Ambrogio di Torino at the original production plant, which attracted hundreds of enthusiasts who exhibited dozens of restored ITOM models, in the presence of the Italian champion Sergio Bongiovanni and the rider who holds the world speed record on a 50cc motorcycle, Piercarlo Borri.
