= Dhinna Bellur =

Village in Tamil Nadu, India

Dhinna Bellur is a village in Pennagarem Taluk, Dharmapuri District, Tamil Nadu, India. This village is surrounded by hills and 70% of the population is engaged in agriculture and allied activities for their livelihood. It is just 30 kilometres (19 mi) from Hogenakkal falls (one of the best-known tourist spots in Tamil Nadu) and close to a Muthaiyan Temple near Neruppur (by the Cavery River).
