= Beryl Splatt =

Australian biochemist

Beryl Splatt MBE
- Born: 1902; Perth, Australia
- Died: 1982 (aged 79–80); St Kilda, Australia
- Occupation: Biochemist
- Parent(s): Maud Rebecca Pickering and William James Splatt

Beryl Audrey Pickering Splatt, MBE (1902-1982) was an Australian biochemist. She was born in 1902 in Perth, Australia. Her parents, Maud Rebecca Pickering from Victoria and William James Splatt from Perth, had married in July 1898 in Perth.

Perhaps her interest in science was imparted by her father, a partner in the Electrical Engineers and Contractors, Splatt. Wall, and Co. In any event, Splatt graduated with an MSc from the University of Melbourne and was a member of the Victorian Women Graduates Association. Following postgraduate work at Middlesex Hospital, London, which she undertook on a Carnegie Grant, Beryl Splatt returned to Melbourne. She worked as a biochemist and metabolist at Royal Melbourne Hospital from 1923 to 1964 and also as a clinical biochemistry demonstrator at the University of Melbourne (1940 - 1961). During this time she was also a committee member of the Red Cross Blood Transfusion Service and a member of the Royal Melbourne Clinical School. Splatt was the inaugural President of the Association of Hospital Scientists of Victoria.

She died in St Kilda, Victoria, Australia in 1982.

== Published works ==
- Beryl Splatt, 'The Liver Glycogen After Partial Pancreatectomy in the Guinea Pig', Australian Journal of Experimental Biology and Medical Science (1927) 4, 213–219.
- NH Fairley and B Splatt, 'I. Venom Yields in Australian Poisonous Snakes', Medical Journal of Australia, (1929), 1:11, 336-348.
- PL Basely, Rachel Jokorowicz and Beryl Splatt, 'Dose Rates and Blood Concentrations of Sulphanilamide in Horses', The Australian Veterinary Journal, (1939), 15, 199-205.

== Honours, decorations, awards and distinctions ==
On 1 January 1965, Splatt was appointed a Member of the Order of the British Empire (OBE - Civil) in recognition of her work in the Biochemistry Department of Melbourne Hospital.
