= Andrew Mowatt Whisker =

Canadian politician

Andrew Mowat Whisker

MLA for Cowichan-Newcastle
- In office 1949–1952

Personal details
- Born: March 14, 1907 Ladysmith, British Columbia
- Died: April 4, 1992 (aged 85) Vernon, British Columbia
- Party: British Columbia Liberal Party

Andrew Mowatt Whisker (March 14, 1907 – April 4, 1992) was a lumberman and political figure in British Columbia. He represented Cowichan-Newcastle in the Legislative Assembly of British Columbia from 1949 to 1952 as a Liberal.

== Biography ==
He was born in Ladysmith, British Columbia, the son of Peter Whisker and Isabelle Mowat, both natives of Scotland. In 1931, he married Mary Dixon. Whisker was a member of a Liberal-Conservative coalition in the provincial assembly. He was defeated when he ran for reelection to the assembly in 1952 and 1953. In 1957, Whisker became a member of the British Columbia Social Credit Party.

He died at a hospital in Vernon, British Columbia in 1992.
