= Beryl Williams =

American politician (1914–1999)

- Born: May 23, 1914; Bangor, Maine
- Died: May 7, 1999 (aged 84)
- Occupations: Educator, college professor

Beryl Elizabeth Williams (May 23, 1914 – May 7, 1999) played a leading role in the desegregation of the Baltimore public school system and is considered the mother of continuing education at Morgan State University, a historical black college located in Baltimore, Maryland.

Williams Hall located at the University of Maine Orono campus is dedicated in her name with murals painted by Rachel Gloria Adams and Ryan Adams, in celebration of Black Heritage in Maine.

== Early life and education ==
She was born Beryl Elizabeth Warner in Bangor, Maine. Her father was a Bangor and Aroostook Railroad porter and her mother owned and operated a Bangor boarding house. In 1935, she became the first African-American to receive a bachelor's degree in mathematics from the University of Maine; she earned her master's degree in mathematics in 1940, and in 1972 she received an honorary doctorate of pedagogy degree from the same university.

From a very early age, Williams was involved in public service. At the age of seven, she played the piano at church services in jails and mental hospitals. As an adult, she continued her public service by serving on the board of the Park Heights Street Academy.

== Career ==
Williams taught at several southern colleges before moving to Baltimore in 1948 where she began her career at the old Morgan College as a part-time English instructor before becoming a full-time English and Mathematics instructor. She was appointed the first female academic Dean at Morgan State University, for the Center of Continuing Education, in 1970. She remained in that position until her retirement.

In 1974, Williams was nominated by Mayor Schaefer and unanimously confirmed to the Board of School Commissioners by the Baltimore City Council. She was Vice President of the Baltimore City School Board until 1984.

In 1975, she received a plaque of recognition from the city of Baltimore's Delta Sigma Theta sorority, and the news was featured in Jet magazine.

The Dr. Beryl W. Williams Scholarship was established to honor Williams, Dean of Continuing Studies at Morgan State University, upon her retirement in 1981. Williams believed that, “continuing education was of great and lasting value to Morgan State University and as the workforce changed there would be a need for people to retool their skills.”

Williams participated in many organizations and committees, including the United Methodist Church; Delta Sigma Theta sorority; the American Red Cross; the Advisory Council on Human Relations for the Maryland State Department of Education; the Adult Education and Association of USA Legislation; the Adult Student Personnel Association; the American Association of University Women; Citizens for Black History; the National Negro Business and Professional Women's Club; the Baltimore Museum of Art; the Peale Museum; the Maryland Association for Adult Education; the National Council of Negro Women (Baltimore section) and the YWCA: Greater Baltimore Task Force on Racial Justice.

== Personal life ==
Williams died on May 7, 1999, at the age of 85.
