= Beryl Donkin =

Beryl Killeen Donkin OBE (1920–1991), a legal secretary, was from 1941 the Queensland Law Society's first, and for many years sole, paid employee. She held the position of assistant secretary and then secretary for 40 years until her retirement in 1981. Beryl Donkin was a mentor and supporter of Joan Bennett, the first female founding partner of any law firm in Brisbane.

Her commitment to the Queensland legal profession was honoured with the award of Order of the British Empire in 1975 for "her devoted and untiring service to the Queensland Law Society". Several legal prizes are named in her honour, including the "Beryl Donkin Memorial Award" and the "Beryl Donkin Trust Prize"
