= Belur V. Dasarathy =

Belur V. Dasarathy is an internationally recognized expert in information fusion and related technologies. Dr. Dasarathy is Fellow of the Institute of Electrical and Electronics Engineers and a consultant in design and development of automated intelligent decision systems arising in a variety of applications.
