= Burl (given name) =

Burl is the given name of:

- Burl Barer (born 1947), American author and literary historian best known for his work on the character of Simon Templar, a.k.a. "the Saint"
- Burl Cain, warden of Louisiana State Penitentiary (also known as Angola)
- Burl Carraway (born 1999), American baseball pitcher
- Burl Friddle (1900–1978), American basketball player and coach
- Burl Jaybird Coleman (1896–1950), American country blues harmonica player, guitarist and singer
- Burl Ives (1909–1995), American actor, folk music singer and writer
- Burl Osborne (c. 1937 – 2012), American reporter and publisher
- Burl Plunkett (1933–2008), former women's basketball coach at the University of Oklahoma
- Burl Reid (born 1978), Australian swimmer
- Burl Toler (1928–2009), American football official
- Burl Toler III (born 1983), American football coach
- Burl S. Watson (1893–1975), American businessman

== See also ==
- Berl (name)
