= Beryl Esembe =

Cameroonian anthropologist, sociologist and philanthropist

Beryl Nalova Esembe
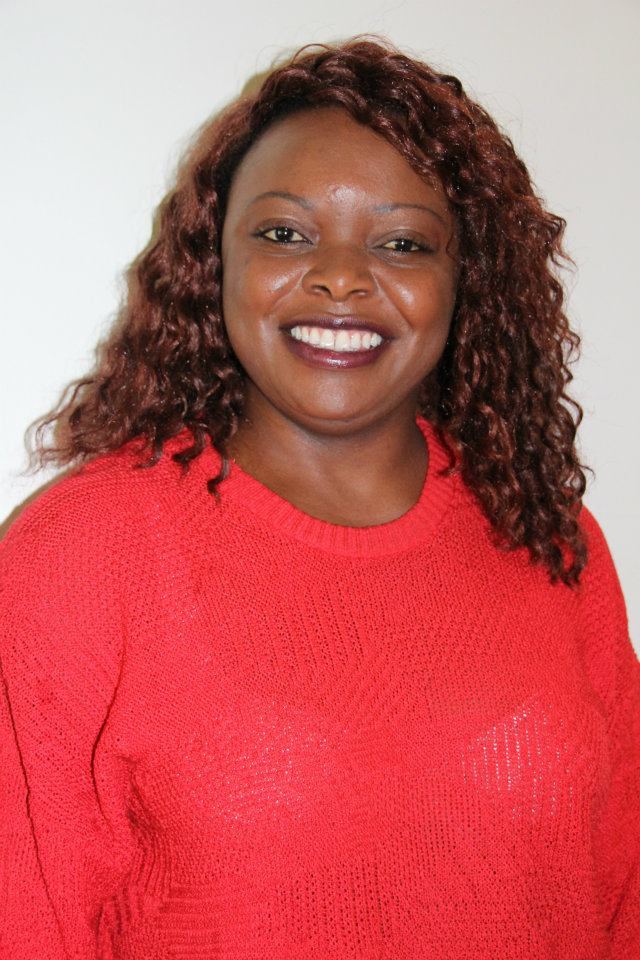
- Born: July 10, 1972 (age 54)
- Occupations: Sociologist, anthropologist, writer

Beryl-Adolphs Nalowa Esembe (born July 10, 1972) is a Cameroonian sociologist and anthropologist. She was trained in Cyprus by the present anti-Human trafficking coordinator for the European Commission. She is the author of the book Because I am a Foreigner - Migrant Women In Cyprus Speak Out, the first book published about human trafficking in the Republic of Cyprus. She is a Seventh-day Adventist Christian. She is also the author of How Do You Burn? God Answers Wen We Call. The Intercessors' Regalia. and the most recent controversial book, The Book After Revelations - The You Testament.

Esembe has become a global voice for the fight against human trafficking and has worked at all levels trying to prevent human trafficking. While In Cyprus she was involved in rescue and tracing human trafficking chains. Presently in a project called The Ghana Project, Esembe is going from school to school teaching children about human trafficking and how to recognize potential human trafficking chains. In Ghana, her organisation is sponsoring more than 140 children were victims of child trafficking. She has observed in her 14 years of working in the fight against human trafficking that education and effective awareness programs are the best tools to combat it.

Global Women Lobby

Esembe has created The Global Women Lobby , which brings together non-governmental organisations and individuals all over the world to work for the fight against exploitation and human trafficking. The lobby will work with ministers of governments in various countries and with international organizations to take human trafficking seriously at all levels of education, and teach people how to recognize a potential human trafficking chain. Details of how this will work are on the website https://web.archive.org/web/20160304064937/http://berylasoboministries.org/global-women-lobby/

As a public speaker, Esembe has narrowed her interest to gender violence prevention as well as religious topics. She has been a guest speaker in conferences in the UK, Canada , and Cyprus. She organizes conferences and events when the need arises mainly for the empowerment of women in 'foreign' conditions and to educate women generally.

Esembe is the founder of Travel Trade Africa, a non-political organization of Africans and supporters of Africa in Cyprus and abroad with the stated aim of creating solidarity, love, and community consciousness among Africans in the diaspora, and facilitate friendship with non-African people. She graduated with a Bachelor of Arts (with a major in religion and a minor in biology) from Andrews University from the Campus in Nigeria, the then Adventist Seminary of West Africa). She holds a master's degree in sociology from InterCollege Nicosia, now called the University of Nicosia.

Esembe was the originator of the Classical Singers and the Harbingers of Cameroon. She is also a composer and singer. Apart from multiple albums released with her groups she has one album of her own, titled Ngele Kuma Ngele.

Esembe is the founding bishop and leading elder of Inspiration Talks 4 Women . This is a movement of believers who have come to understand that no denomination is a taxi to heaven.

Esembe was ordained as a canon bishop by the International Council of Pentecostal Bishops in February 2015 (Recife, Brazil) by Archbishop Clinton Lloyd Battieste, the Chief Prelate and president.
