= Christine Berl =

American classical composer

Christine Berl (born 1943) is an American composer, pianist, and Egyptian-style Oriental dancer.

== Biography ==
Christine Berl is the daughter of Paul Berl, longtime accompanist of Victoria de los Ángeles. She was born in New York City, and graduated with a Bachelor of Arts degree in piano from Mannes College of Music in 1964. She continued her education at Queen's College, graduating with a Master of Arts degree in composition in 1970. She also studied Schenkerian studies with Ernst Oster and Carl Schachter. As a dancer, she studied ballet for many years in New York with Russian teachers Vera Nemtchinova and Vladimir Dokoudovsky. Then she studied Egyptian-style Oriental dance for many years with the famous Egyptian choreographer Yousry Sharif, as well as with choreographer Mahmoud Reda in Cairo.

== Career ==
Berl's music has innovated what she calls a Chakra form, arrived at using serial techniques and interval cycle theory connected to the Passacaglia form. "Elegy" (1974) is completely in this form, "The Lord of the Dance" (1989) ends with a chakra and there are several chakras in "Masmoudi" for violin and piano (2012).

She has served as artistic consultant for Tirreno Records. Peter Serkin premiered her piece, "Lord of the Dance," in 1989 and played it again in 1990 at the 92nd Street Y Distinguished Artists Series (the piece was commissioned by him in 1989).

The pianist Carlo Levi Minzi has recorded two of Berl's works, "Elegy" and "Lord of the Dance," on Rusty Records. "Dark Summer" was written for Frederica von Stade and commissioned by the Lincoln Center Chamber Music Society in 1989. The pianist was Richard Goode. "Elegy" was also performed by Andre-Michel Schub on the Princeton University concert series in 1976 and by Emanuel Ax at the Ravinia Fall Festival in 1988. "Ab la Dolchor" (text by Henry Weinfield) for mezzo, clarinet, piano, viola, cello was premiered by Richard Stoltzman in 1990 at the 92nd Street Y concert entitled "The Music of Christine Berl."

As a dancer, Berl has performed widely in nightclubs in Morocco. An article on her as a dancer appeared in the New York Times, July 31, 1999.

Her most recent activity has been in the field of photo modelling, working in a great diversity of genres. Some of the photographers she has worked with have been Simon Cave (Vicinus exhibit at the Ludlow Gallery NYC 2015), Henri Senders, Sergio Maier, Vlad Kenner, Debinevsky, Boris Mirkin, Alessandro Didoni, Pablo Massa and Carney Malone. She shoots primarily in Italy, Holland and the United States.

== Works ==
Selected works include:

- Dark Summer for voice, piano, and string trio, 1989
- The Violent Bear it Away for orchestra, 1988
- Elegy for piano solo, 1974
- Three pieces for Chamber Ensemble, 1975
- Sonata for piano, 1986–87
- The Lord of the Dance, 1989
- Masmoudi for Violin and Piano, 2012
- "The Cows," text by Lydia Davis, for a cappella chorus SATB, 2012
- "Baladi" for Solo Alto Flute (microtonal), 2013

Her work has been recorded and issued on media, including:

- Three Pieces For Chamber Ensemble, American Society Of University Composers (Record No.7) (LP) 1984
