= Beryl Mildred Cryer =

Canadian writer (1889–1980)

Beryl Mildred Cryer (1889–1980) was a Canadian writer about Indigenous cultures on Vancouver Island.

== Biography ==
Beryl Mildred Cryer was born in England in 1889, and migrated to Canada with her family as a child. She lived in Chemainus, BC for much of her life. She died in Welland, Ontario in 1980.

== Work ==
An educated woman from a privileged background, and married to a businessman, Beryl Cryer was both a homemaker, and a journalist and newspaper columnist. She was introduced by her neighbour Mary Rice (Tzea-Mntenaht) and also by Jennie Wyse (Tstass-Aya) and other Elders, to cultural traditions and narratives of the Hul'qumi'num people and this connection was key, allowing her to receive the stories of places and people that feature in so much of her writing.

The stories that she gathered from Elders, mostly women, through her relationship with Mary Rice were the source of many newspaper articles about Indigenous life and history on Vancouver Island, including oral narrative stories published between 1929 and 1935 in the Victoria Daily Colonist Sunday Magazine. She also published the book Flying Canoe: Legends of the Cowichans in 1949.

Highlighting the unique value of Cryer's work, scholar Sarah Morales reflects that Cryer didn't guide her interviewees, but rather listened carefully and recorded the stories of the Elders just as they were told to her, resulting in a richness and completeness not found in other ethnographic sources.

== Legacy ==
Cryer's writings, and the stories passed on through her by many Hul’qumi’num Elders, have been an important and unique resource both to Indigenous and settler communities, and to scholarship in the social life and history of Vancouver Island. These works include:

- Chris Arnett and Beryl Mildred Cryer. Two houses half-buried in sand: Oral traditions of the Hul'q'umi'num' Coast Salish of Kuper Island and Vancouver Island. Vancouver: Talonbooks, 2007.
- John Lutz, Makúk: A New History of Aboriginal-White Relations. Vancouver: UBC Press, 2014.
- The Two Houses Half-Buried in Sand Digital Map which aims to revive the legacy of Beryl Cryer's Hul'qumi'num contributors, providing a visual, interactive interface that locates these stories in place and mobilizes Hul'qumi'num perspectives of ancestral landscapes and waters on and around Vancouver Island, the Gulf Islands, the lower Fraser River, and beyond.

Cryer's correspondence related to her research and writing is held by the BC Archives.
