= Smita Bellur =

Indian musician

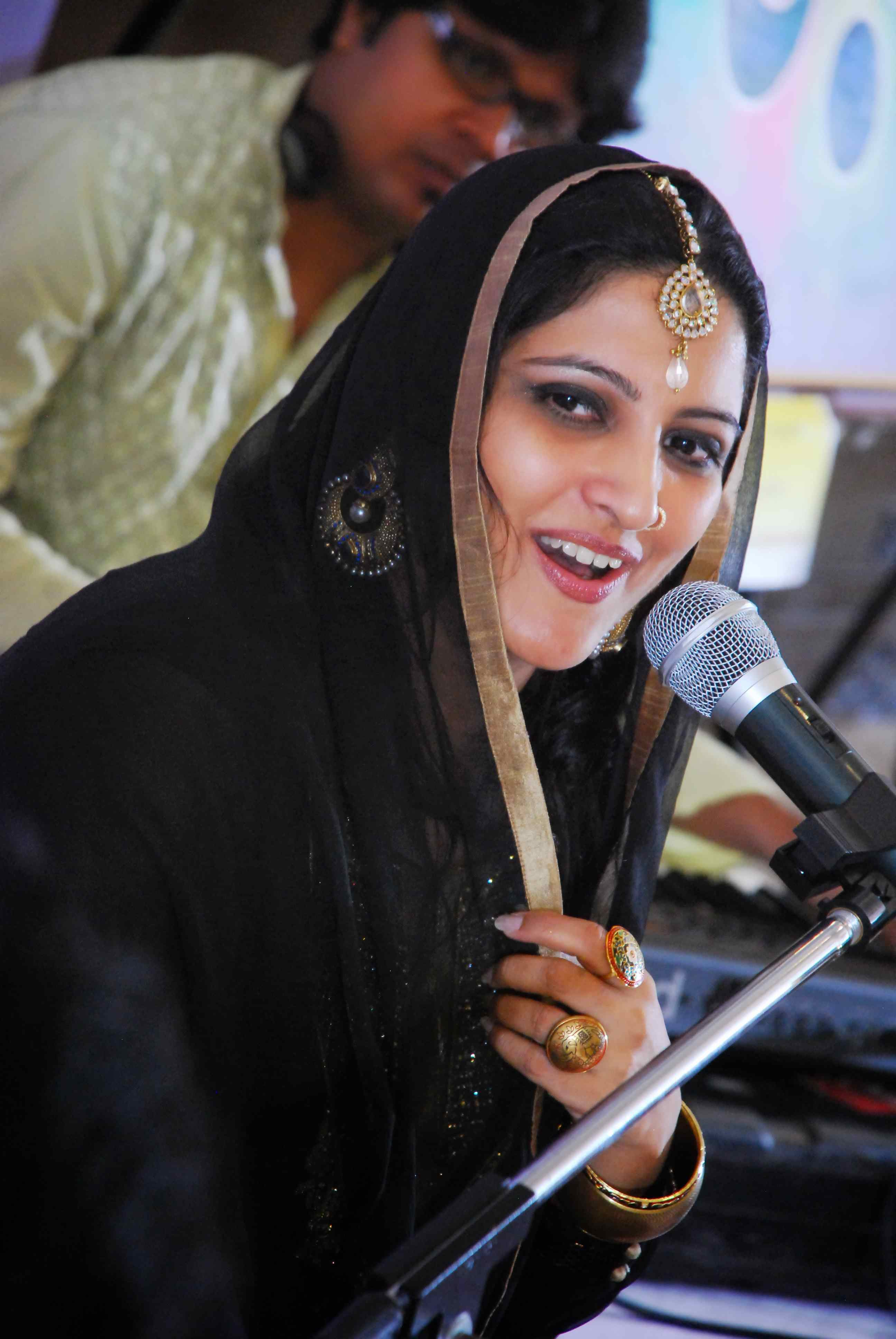
- Smita Bellur Hindustani Classical Sufi singer

Background information
- Genres: Hindustani classical and Sufi devotional music
- Occupations: Musician and singer
- Instrument: Sufi singer
- Years active: 25
- Website: www.smitabellur.com

Smita Rao Bellur is an Indian singer of Hindustani classical music, particularly the Khyal genre, as well as Sufi devotional music. including (Qawwali. She is associated with the Kirana gharana, a prominent musical lineage that originated in Jaipur.

== Life and career ==
Smita Rao Bellur hails from North Karnataka, India.

She regularly broadcasts as a graded artiste (B High) from India's national broadcasting network- All India Radio/Doordarshan, and from media/TV Networks and radio channels such as ETV Urdu/Kannada, Zee, Doordarshan, TV9 and Suvarna/Asianet and All India Radio/Doordarshan, FM channels such as 92.7BIG FM in addition to Twaang, Apple music, Spotify, Gaana, Saavn, Wynk, Hungama and Amazon music etc.

Smita has earlier been a senior faculty at the Shankar Mahadevan Academy. In addition, she also works on a fellowship research project by the Karnataka Sangeeta Nritya Academy and the India Foundation for the Arts.

She holds a Master of Science in Quality Management (MS QM) from BITS Pilani and a Bachelor of Engineering from Bangalore University. Prior to her career in music, she worked in the software industry, holding positions at multinational companies such as First Apex, Oracle, and SAP. She later transitioned to a full-time career in music.

== Music training ==
Smita Bellur commenced her musical education under the guidance of P.R. Bhagwat and Arjunsa Nakod. She subsequently received advanced training from Rajabhau Sontakke, a disciple of Omkarnath Thakur, as well as from Bhalachandra Nakod. At present, she is undergoing training in Khyal under Alka Dev Marulkar. In addition to her classical training, Bellur is studying Sufiana music and Qawwali with Naasir–Nazeer Ahmed Warsi of Hyderabad, known collectively as the Warsi Brothers. They are grandsons of the renowned Qawwal Padmashri Aziz Ahmed Warsi. Her studies in Sufism are further supported by mentorship from Dr. Ejazuddin Ashrafi and Syed Zia Alvi, both based in Delhi.

=== Audio releases ===
- Na Aaye Wo Na To (Ghazal)
- Kaisi Madhur Shyam (Bhajan, Holi, Chaiti). For the End Polio campaign by Rotary International)
- Vachana Kirana (Shiva Sharana, Vachana)
