= Kenneth Forrest Duncan =

Canadian politician

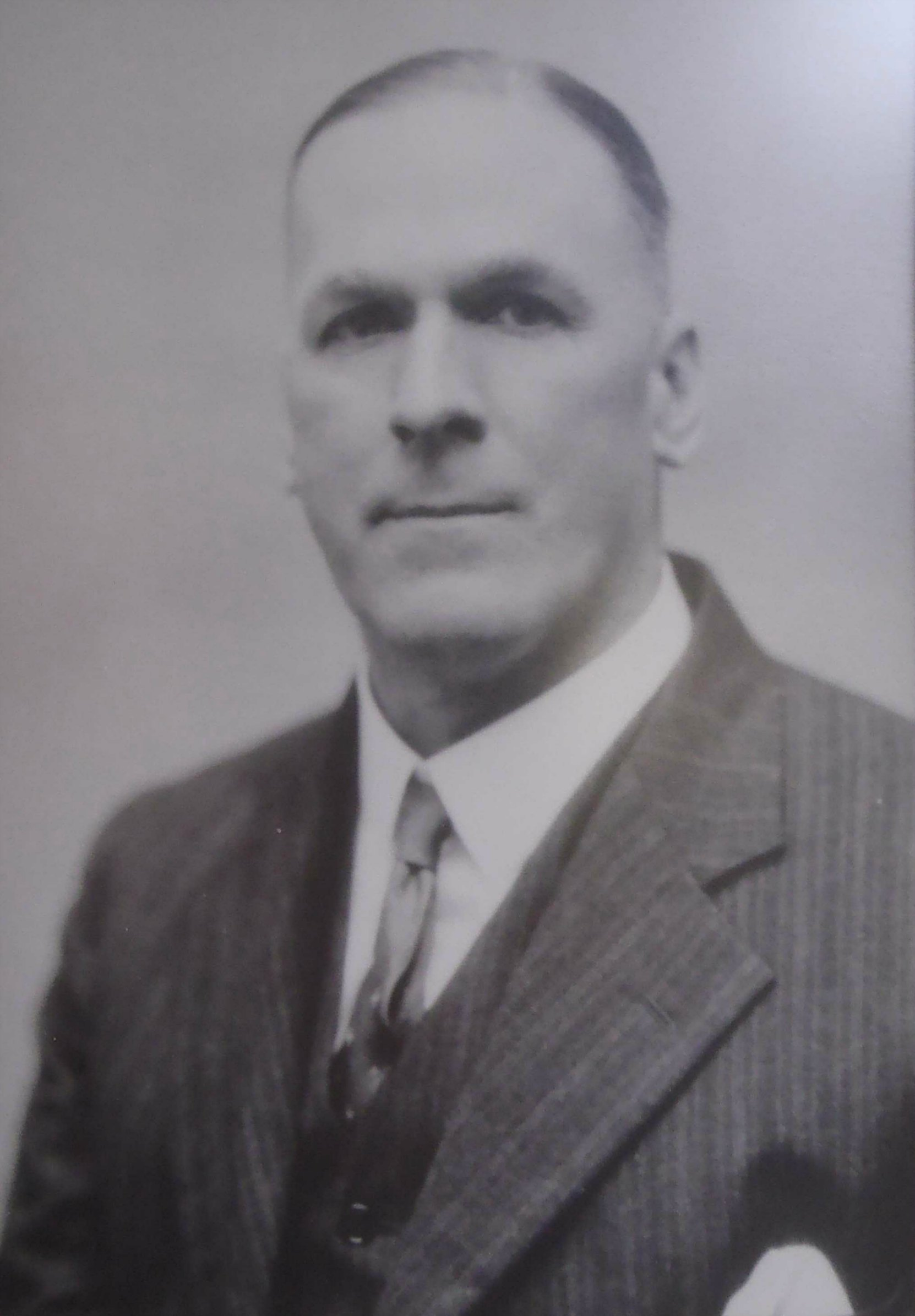
- Kenneth Forrest Duncan, circa 1920

1st mayor of Duncan, British Columbia
- In office 1912–1913
- Preceded by: position established
- Succeeded by: Ormond Towers Smythe

Member of the Legislative Assembly of British Columbia for Cowichan
- In office 1919–1924

Personal details
- Born: March 7, 1881 Duncan, British Columbia, Canada
- Died: February 4, 1952 (aged 70) Duncan, British Columbia, Canada
- Spouse: Agnes Patterson (m. 1912)
- Parent: William Chalmers Duncan (father)

Kenneth Forrest Duncan (March 7, 1881 – February 4, 1952) was a public servant, farmer, financial agent and political figure in British Columbia. He represented Cowichan in the Legislative Assembly of British Columbia from 1919 to 1924 as an Independent member. He served as the first mayor of Duncan, British Columbia from 1912 to 1913

He was born in Duncan, British Columbia, which was named after his father, William Chalmers Duncan. Duncan was employed with the civil service in Ottawa from 1901 to 1903 and then farmed in Duncan from 1903 until 1907 when he established his own business. He was elected mayor of Duncan in 1912. In 1912, he married Agnes Patterson. Duncan was defeated by William Henry Hayward when he ran for a seat in the assembly in 1916 and then was elected in a 1919 by-election held after Hayward assumed official military duties in Ottawa. He was re elected in 1920 and then defeated when he ran for reelection in the new riding of Cowichan-Newcastle in 1924 as a candidate for the Provincial Party. He died in Duncan at the age of 70.
