= Cowichan =

Cowichan /ˈkaʊ.wɪtʃən/ may refer either to:

- the Cowichan Tribes First Nation located in and around Duncan, British Columbia
- the Cowichan Valley, a region on Vancouver Island centred on Duncan, British Columbia, which contains:
  - Cowichan Valley Regional District, a supra-municipal regional government
  - Cowichan Lake, a 30 km long body of water
  - the town of Lake Cowichan
  - Cowichan River
  - Cowichan Bay, British Columbia, a bay and community.
- the Cowichan sweater, a heavy-wool knit animal and geometric patterns made by the women of the Cowichan people.

British Columbia provincial electoral districts

- Cowichan 1871–1890, 1898–1920
- Cowichan-Alberni 1894
- Cowichan-Newcastle 1924–1963
- Cowichan-Malahat 1966–1986
- Cowichan-Ladysmith 1991–2005
- Nanaimo-North Cowichan 2009–2020
- Cowichan Valley 2009–present

Canadian federal electoral districts

- Cowichan—Malahat—The Islands 1976–1987
- Nanaimo—Cowichan 1987–2013
- Nanaimo—Cowichan—The Islands 1962–1976
- Cowichan—Malahat—Langford 2013–present

Other

- Cowichan Herald Extraordinary, one of the officers of arms at the Canadian Heraldic Authority

== Transportation ==
- Cowichan, a steamship that operated in British Columbia from 1908 to 1925.
- HMCS Cowichan, the name of three vessels in the Canadian Navy;
  - HMCS Cowichan (J146), a Canadian Bangor-class minesweeper commissioned in 1941 and sold in 1946.
  - HMCS Cowichan (MCB 147), a Canadian Bay-class minesweeper commissioned in 1953 and sold to France in 1954.
  - HMCS Cowichan (MCB 162), a Canadian Bay-class minesweeper commissioned in 1957 and decommissioned in 1997 .
