= British Columbia Highway 18 =

Highway on Vancouver Island in British Columbia, Canada

Highway 18
- Cowichan Valley Highway
- Highway 18 highlighted in red

Route information
- Maintained by the Ministry of Transportation and Infrastructure
- Length: 25.76 km (16.01 mi)
- Existed: 1953–present

Major junctions
- East end: Highway 1 (TCH) in Duncan
- West end: Youbou Road in Lake Cowichan

Location
- Country: Canada
- Province: British Columbia

Highway system
- British Columbia provincial highways
← Highway 17A	→ Highway 19

Highway 18 is a short main vehicle route in the Cowichan Valley Regional District on Vancouver Island, connecting the city of Duncan on the Trans-Canada Highway with the community of Lake Cowichan, on the shore of Cowichan Lake. The highway first opened to vehicle traffic in 1953, and was re-routed to a straighter and wider alignment in 1970. The speed limit along most of the highway is 100 km/h (62 mph).

In late 2006, drivers using Highway 18 experienced broken parts (such as windows with big shatter marks) on their cars, most of these came from loose rocks after passing other drivers. This generated anger and was called the "Sealcoat Job" because of the bad gravel sealcoating of the stretch to Duncan from the Cowichan Lake Road junction at Lake Cowichan by the new highway contractor company.

In early 2004, a proposal was brought forward to extend Highway 18 west from Lake Cowichan, all the way along existing logging roads to the community of Port Renfrew on the southwest coast of Vancouver Island, as a way of rerouting traffic from the northern part of the Island to Victoria in case of a bad accident or any other extraordinary event forcing a closure of the Malahat. The highway between Mesachie Lake and Port Renfrew is known as the Pacific Marine Circle Route.

== Major intersections ==
The entire route is in Cowichan Valley Regional District.

Location	km	mi	Destinations	Notes
Lake Cowichan	−1.12	−0.70	South Shore Road (Highway 902:0383 west) / North Shore Road – Mesachie Lake, Honeymoon Bay	Roundabout; former Highway 18 western terminus; roadway follows Cowichan Lake Road (Highway 902:0383 east)
Lake Cowichan	−0.45	−0.28	Cowichan Lake Road east	Original Highway 18 alignment; roadway becomes Cowichan Valley Highway
Lake Cowichan	0.00	0.00	Youbou Road (Highway 902:0386 west) / Highway 902:0383 ends – Youbou	Highway 18 western terminus; Highway 902:0386 eastern terminus
	6.86	4.26	Skutz Falls Road – Skutz Falls	To Highway 902:0348
Duncan	25.76	16.01	Highway 1 (TCH) / Herd Road – Nanaimo, Victoria	Highway 18 eastern terminus; continues as Herd Road
1.000 mi = 1.609 km; 1.000 km = 0.621 mi: Closed/former
