= Cowichan River Provincial Park =

Provincial park in British Columbia, Canada

- IUCN category II (national park)
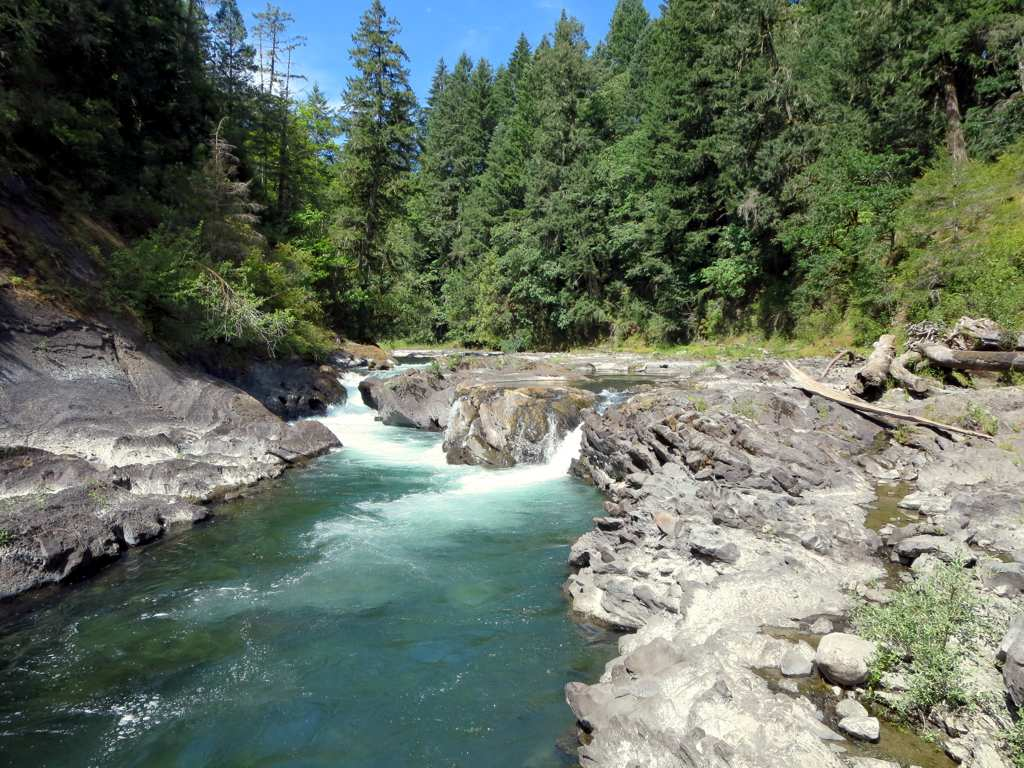
- The upper reaches of the Cowichan River

- Location within Vancouver Island Location within British Columbia Location within Cowichan Valley Regional District
- Interactive map of Cowichan River Provincial Park
- Location: Cowichan Valley, British Columbia
- Nearest city: Cowichan Lake; Duncan
- Coordinates: 48°46′19″N 123°53′44″W
- Area: 1,418 ha (5.47 sq mi)
- Created: July 12, 1995
- Governing body: BC Parks
- Operator: K2 Cowichan Park Services Ltd.

Cowichan River Provincial Park is a provincial park on Vancouver Island in British Columbia, Canada. It includes the Cowichan River in a 1,418 ha (3,500 acres) area stretching almost 20 kilometres in length from the village of Lake Cowichan to Glenora, just south of Duncan. The Cowichan Valley Trail runs the length of the park, which is part of the greater Trans Canada Trail.
