= Somena =

Indigenous peoples living in Vancouver Island, Canada

The Somena (or S’amuna’) are one of several Hul̓q̓umín̓um̓-speaking indigenous peoples living in the Cowichan Valley-Duncan region of Vancouver Island, British Columbia, Canada.

The Somena were one of seven tribes or nations that were forced to amalgamate into one "band", named the Cowichan Tribes after their general location, the Cowichan Valley and Cowichan Bay. The other peoples henceforth known as "the Cowichans" were the Quamichan/Kw’amutsun (the largest cultural group), Clemclemaluts (L’uml’umuluts), Comiaken (Qwum’yiqun’), Khenipsen (Hinupsum), Kilpahlas (Tl’ulpalus), and Koksilah (Hwulqwselu).
