= Gordon Bay Provincial Park =

Canadian provincial park

- IUCN category II (national park)
- Location within Vancouver Island Location within British Columbia Location within Cowichan Valley Regional District
- Interactive map of Gordon Bay Provincial Park
- Location: Honeymoon Bay, British Columbia, Canada
- Coordinates: 48°50′10″N 124°11′49″W
- Area: 104 ha (260 acres)
- Established: September 18, 1969
- Governing body: BC Parks

Gordon Bay Provincial Park is a provincial park in British Columbia, Canada.

== Geography ==
Gordon Bay is located on the western shore of the south end of Cowichan Lake. The 49-hectare park of second-growth Douglas fir forest is in one of Vancouver Island's sunniest valleys and is a popular campsite in the Cowichan Valley area. There are many species of birds, such as juncos, Steller's jays and chestnut-backed chickadees, as well as mergansers and golden-eye ducks. Wildlife includes deer, raccoons, and red squirrels. Rainbow, Dolly Varden, and cutthroat trout live in the lake, and chum, coho, and spring salmon spawn in the lake and in its tributaries. Steelhead spawn in the Cowichan River.
