= Mount Tzouhalem =

Mountain in Canada

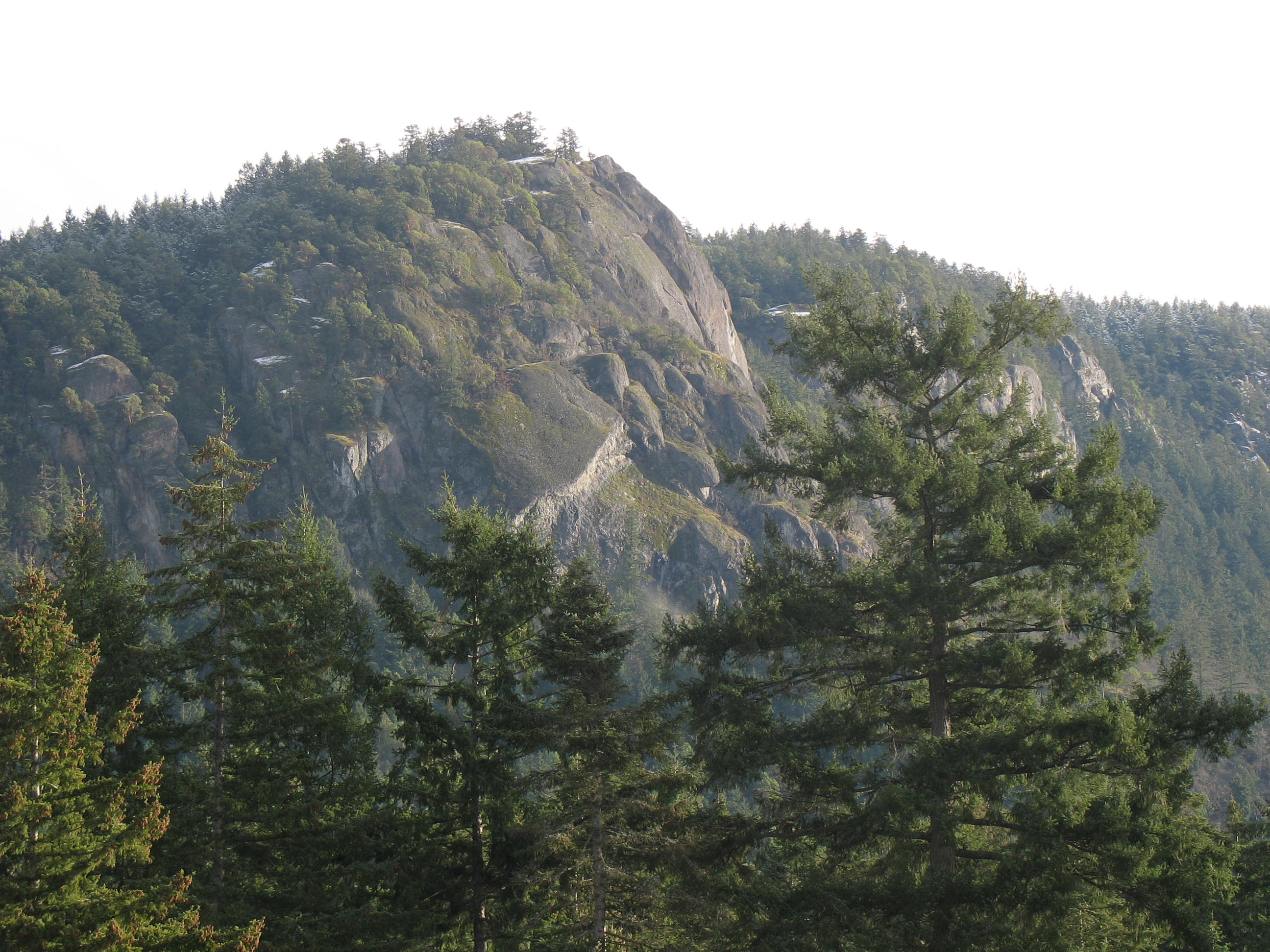
- Summit of Mount Tzouhalem

Highest point
- Elevation: 536 m (1,759 ft)
- Coordinates: 48°46′42″N 123°36′52″W

Geography
- Location within British Columbia
- Location: Vancouver Island, British Columbia, Canada
- District: Cowichan Land District
- Topo map: NTS 92B13 Duncan

Mount Tzouhalem is a mountain on Vancouver Island, British Columbia, Canada, 4 kilometres east-northeast of Duncan in the municipality of North Cowichan. It is situated between Quamichan Lake, Maple Bay and Cowichan Bay.

The mountain is part of the municipal forest lands. Part of the mountain is an 18-hectare ecological reserve. It is popular with hikers and mountain bikers. It gives views towards Saltspring Island, the Coastal Mountains of the Lower Mainland and, on a clear day, Mount Baker in Washington state.

There was a large Christian cross on one cliffside. The original wooden cross, placed by local Catholic churches in the 1970s, was replaced by the Knights of Columbus with a welded version in the late 1980s. In the night from July 16th to July 17th 2021, unknown individuals removed the cross for unknown reasons.

== Naming ==
The mountain was originally named "Shkewetsen" (meaning "basking" or "warming in the sun") by the local First Nations. According to legend, the local inhabitants fled to the mountain to escape the rising waters of a great flood. When the waters subsided, a frog was seen warming itself in the sun on a large rock on the side of the mountain. The frog rock formation was called "Pip'oom" (meaning "little swelled-up one").

The mountain was renamed after a preeminent Quamichan chief who lived his final years on the side of the mountain after being banished by his own people.

Born of a Quamichan man and a Comiaken woman, Tzouhalem was trained to be a warrior by his grandmother. He was infamous for his combative and unruly behaviour. His fighting prowess probably helped establish Quamichan as the largest and wealthiest of the Cowichan villages.

In addition to defeating northern invaders near Maple Bay, in part by disguising warriors in canoes as women, Tzouhalem assumed command of the First Nations attacking Fort Victoria in 1844. Enraged by the fort's demands for compensation or punishment following the slaying of some ranging cattle, Tzouhalem's warriors peppered the fort with threats and musket balls for two days until its Chief Factor Roderick Finlayson arranged for demonstrations of the fort's nine-inch cannons. After the cannons destroyed a cedar-bark hut and a canoe, the parties negotiated compensation to resolve the dispute and Tzouhalem withdrew his forces.

Because of his frequent murders, Tzouhalem was at last banished by his fellow tribesmen, and took up residence in a cave on the side of Mount Tzouhalem. He had fourteen wives living with him, most of whom had been widowed by him. In 1859, when trying to gain another wife from Penelakut Island (Kuper Island until 2010), he was killed by her or her husband.

The mountain served as the target for the cannons of HMS Trincomalee of the Royal Navy's Pacific Squadron when it signalled its arrival in Cowichan Bay. Early maps by the British identified the area as "Tzohailim Hill" (1855) and "Tzohailin Hill" (1864). In 1911, the Geographical Names Board of Canada adopted "Tzuhalem Mountain". In 1950, the form of name changed to "Mount Tzuhalem" until the spelling was altered to Mount Tzouhalem in 2000 to align with the local, traditional spelling supported by the Cowichan Tribes band government.

== Ecological Reserve ==
After the Cowichan Valley Naturalists' Society encountered signs in 1979 that a housing subdivision was planned for the area, they successfully lobbied the municipal council and Mayor Graham Bruce to preserve the land. North Cowichan donated the municipally owned land to BC Parks in 1980.

In 1984, BC Parks created the 18-hectare Mount Tzuhalem Ecological Reserve to preserve outstanding Garry oak-wildflower stands. Ecological Reserves are areas in British Columbia selected to preserve representative and special natural ecosystems, plant and animal species, features, and phenomena. Ecological Reserves provide the highest level of protection for the maintenance of physical and biological diversity, while allowing for research and educational activities.

The reserve, at middle elevations (120–280 metres) on the western side of the mountain, faces southwest and has strongly sloping, internally hilly terrain. The Tzuhalem area is a historical harvesting location for the Vancouver Island Coast Salish First Nations. The reserve is a camas harvesting site that was traditionally burned to increase yields and maintain the open, park-like habitat.

== Access ==
Easiest access is from a parking lot at the head of Kaspa Road (~ 30 spaces). The mountain can also be reached from Genoa Bay (most difficult ascent). Trails are open year-round, except during periods of high fire hazard, for non-vehicular traffic.
