= HMCS Cowichan =

Several Canadian naval units have been named HMCS Cowichan;

- HMCS Cowichan (J146), a Bangor-class minesweeper commissioned in 1941 and sold in 1946.
- HMCS Cowichan (MCB 147), a Bay-class minesweeper commissioned in 1953 and sold to France in 1954.
- HMCS Cowichan (MCB 162), a Bay-class minesweeper commissioned in 1957 and decommissioned in 1997.

== Battle honours ==
- Atlantic, 1941–45
- Normandy, 1944
- English Channel, 1944–45
