= Cobble Hill (disambiguation) =

Cobble Hill may refer to:

== United States ==
- Cobble Hill, an alternate name for Tyringham Cobble, a hill in Massachusetts
- Cobble Hill, Brooklyn, a neighborhood in Brooklyn, New York
- Cobble Hill Tunnel, an abandoned railroad tunnel in Brooklyn, New York
- Success Academy Cobble Hill, part of Success Academy Charter Schools
- Cobble Hill is a neighborhood and former hill in Somerville, Massachusetts

== Canada ==
- Cobble Hill, British Columbia, a small community on Vancouver Island, British Columbia (BC)
- Cobble Hill (British Columbia), a hill in British Columbia, namesake of the community
- Cobble Hill, Ontario a community in the municipality of Thames Centre, Ontario
