= Arthur Vickers =

Arthur Vickers may refer to:

- Arthur Vickers (VC) (1882–1944), English soldier and a recipient of the Victoria Cross
- Arthur Vickers (artist) (born 1947), Canadian West Coast storyteller and artist

== See also ==
- Sir Arthur Vicars (1862–1921), genealogist and heraldic expert
