= Marie Canyon =

Canyon in British Columbia, Canada

Coordinates: 48°47′00″N 123°54′00″W

Marie Canyon is a canyon on the Cowichan River, just below Skutz Falls, on southern Vancouver Island, British Columbia, Canada.

The canyon is named for Marie Adelaide, Viscountess Willingdon, C.I., G.B.E. (wife of the then-Governor General of Canada), commemorating her canoe trip from Cowichan Lake down the Cowichan River to Duncan on April 7, 1930.
