= Chinook × coho salmon =

Scientific classification
- Kingdom: Animalia
- Phylum: Chordata
- Class: Actinopterygii
- Order: Salmoniformes
- Family: Salmonidae
- Subfamily: Salmoninae
- Genus: Oncorhynchus
- Hybrid: O. × O.

Hybrid species of fish

The chinook × coho salmon (Oncorhynchus tshawytscha × kisutch), or the chinoho, is a hybrid fish. Although earlier examples have been known, such as ones found in Lake Ontario and northern California, second-generation individuals were discovered in the Cowichan River in Canada in 2019.
