= Brian Lundberg =

Canadian ice hockey defenceman (born 1960)

- Born: June 5, 1960 (age 64); Burnaby, British Columbia, Canada
- Height: 5 ft 10 in (178 cm)
- Weight: 187 lb (85 kg; 13 st 5 lb)
- Position: Defence
- Shot: Right
- Played for: Pittsburgh Penguins
- NHL draft: 177th overall, 1980; Pittsburgh Penguins
- Playing career: 1982–1984

Brian Frederick Lundberg (born June 5, 1960) is a Canadian retired ice hockey player who played one game in the National Hockey League for the Pittsburgh Penguins during the 1982–83 season.

== Playing career ==
Lundberg was born in Burnaby, British Columbia and raised in Lake Cowichan, British Columbia. Lundberg played one game for the WCHL's Seattle Breakers in 1977–78 then opted to join the University of Michigan the next season. He spent four years with the Wolverines and was taken 177th overall by the Pittsburgh Penguins in the 1980. Following his senior year in 1981–82 he saw his first action as a pro when he played a few late season games with the American Hockey League's Erie Blades. Lundberg played a game for the Penguins in 1982–83, on February 21, 1983 against the Toronto Maple Leafs, but spent most of the schedule with the Baltimore Skipjacks of the AHL. He retired in 1984 after splitting his time between the Skipjacks and the IHL's Muskegon Mohawks.

== Personal life ==
Lundberg was raised in the small town Lake Cowichan, British Columbia. He currently resides in Honeymoon Bay, British Columbia, and is married with two daughters. In May 2014 he was inducted into the Cowichan Lake Heritage Sports Wall of Fame. He is currently a scout for the Brandon Wheat Kings of the Western Hockey League.

== Career statistics ==
=== Regular season and playoffs ===
			Regular season					Playoffs
Season	Team	League	GP	G	A	Pts	PIM	GP	G	A	Pts	PIM
1977–78	Seattle Breakers	WCHL	1	0	0	0	0	—	—	—	—	—
1978–79	University of Michigan	WCHA	34	4	9	13	73	—	—	—	—	—
1979–80	University of Michigan	WCHA	37	2	14	16	94	—	—	—	—	—
1980–81	University of Michigan	WCHA	40	1	6	7	62	—	—	—	—	—
1981–82	University of Michigan	CCHA	32	3	16	19	42	—	—	—	—	—
1981–82	Erie Blades	AHL	10	0	4	4	6	—	—	—	—	—
1982–83	Pittsburgh Penguins	NHL	1	0	0	0	2	—	—	—	—	—
1982–83	Baltimore Skipjacks	AHL	76	4	15	19	103	—	—	—	—	—
1983–84	Baltimore Skipjacks	AHL	47	1	5	6	97	10	0	3	3	8
1983–84	Muskegon Mohawks	IHL	34	3	12	15	46	—	—	—	—	—
AHL totals			136	5	24	29	206	10	0	3	3	8
NHL totals			1	0	0	0	2	—	—	—	—	—

== See also ==
- List of players who played only one game in the NHL
