= Marie Freeman-Thomas, Marchioness of Willingdon =

British noble, Vicereine of India

The Most Honourable The Marchioness of Willingdon GBE, CI, DStJ
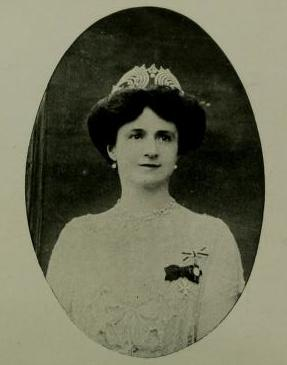

Vicereine of India
- In office 18 April 1931 – 18 April 1936
- Monarchs: George V Edward VIII
- Governor- General: The Marquess of Willingdon
- Preceded by: The Viscountess Goschen (acting); The Lady Irwin
- Succeeded by: The Marchioness of Linlithgow

Personal details
- Born: Marie Adelaide Brassey; 24 March 1875
- Died: 30 January 1960 (aged 84)
- Spouse: Freeman Freeman-Thomas, 1st Marquess of Willingdon
- Children: 2, including Inigo
- Parents: Thomas Brassey, 1st Earl Brassey; Anna Brassey, Baroness Brassey

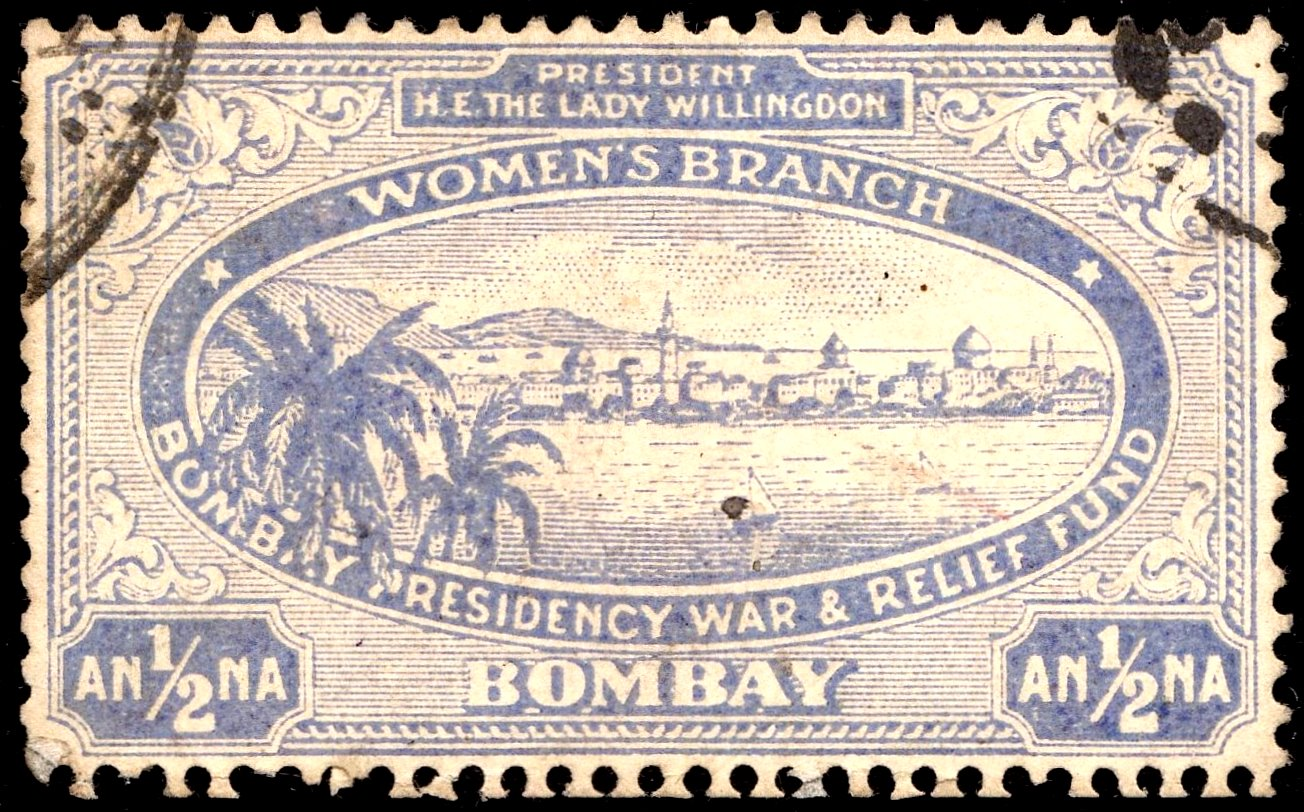
A 1916 charity stamp for the Bombay Presidency War and Relief Fund organised by Lady Willingdon.

Marie Adelaide Freeman-Thomas, Marchioness of Willingdon, GBE, CI, DStJ (née Brassey; 24 March 1875 – 30 January 1960) was a daughter of Thomas Brassey, 1st Earl Brassey. On 20 July 1892, she married Freeman Freeman-Thomas, 1st Marquess of Willingdon (12 September 1866 – 12 August 1941), the future Governor General of Canada and Viceroy of India. They had two sons, Lieutenant Gerard Frederick Freeman-Thomas (3 May 1893 – 14 September 1914), killed, aged 21, in the First World War, and Inigo Brassey Freeman-Thomas, 2nd Marquess of Willingdon (25 July 1899 – 19 March 1979).

== Honours ==
She was:

- Invested as an Imperial Order of the Crown of India (C.I.) in 1917
- Decorated with the Kaisar-i-Hind Gold Medal
- Invested as a Dame of Justice, Venerable Order of Saint John (D.J.St. J.)
- Decorated with the Order of Mercy.
- Invested as a Dame Commander of the Order of the British Empire (DBE) in December 1917
- Invested as a Dame Grand Cross of the Order of the British Empire (GBE) in the 1924 Birthday Honours

== Legacy ==
- Marie Canyon on the Cowichan River, Vancouver Island, is named for her, commemorating a 1930 canoe trip from Cowichan Lake down that river to the city of Duncan, British Columbia.
- The Lady Willingdon Hospital in Lahore, Pakistan, is named after her
- The Lady Willingdon Hospital in Manali, Himachal Pradesh, India, is named after her. www.manalihospital.com

Honorary titles
Preceded by The Viscountess Byng of Vimy	Viceregal Consort of Canada; 1926–1931	Succeeded by The Countess of Bessborough
