= Queen Mary's Technical Institute =

Indian school for disabled soldiers

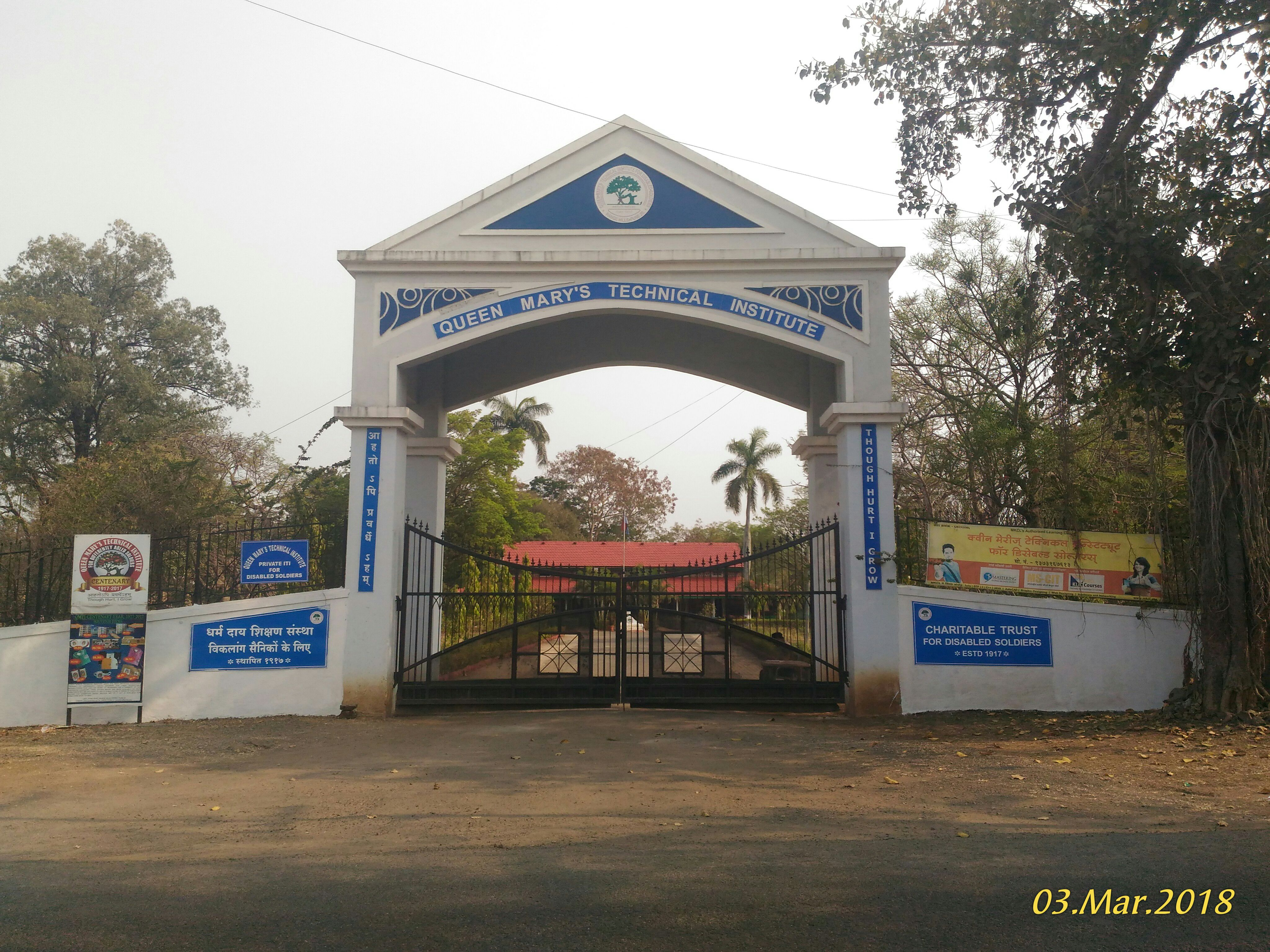
- Type: Military
- Established: 1917
- Location: Pune, Maharashtra, India
- Website: Official Website

Queen Mary's Technical Institute was founded in 1917 in Bombay, India by Lady Marie Willingdon as Queen Mary's Technical School for disabled soldiers. It moved to Pune in 1923.

== Background ==
Lady Marie Willingdon, the wife of the Governor of Bombay, founded the School in May 1917 to help thousands of Indian Soldiers in Bombay who had become disabled during World War I. It moved to Pune in 1923. It was started with personal donation of rupees 10 Lakhs (one million rupees) each from Queen Mary and Lady Marie Willingdon. Its name was changed from Queen Mary's Technical school to Queen Mary's Technical Institute in 1966. It is run as a charitable educational institution and its trustees are selected serving and retired officers from Indian Army, Navy and Air Force.

== Goals and objectives ==
Its admission is open to disabled personnel of the Indian Army and other paramilitary forces. It provides vocational training to disabled personnel to help them be self-sufficient and helps them reintegrate into the mainstream and help them earn a livelihood independently.
