= Cobble Hill (British Columbia) =

Coordinates: 48°41′17″N 123°37′05″W

Cobble Hill, also referred to as Cobble Hill Mountain, is located in Cobble Hill, British Columbia. It is a major attraction for hikers and outdoor enthusiasts in the area. It is 336 meters in elevation, or 1102 feet. It is mostly covered in evergreen and maple trees, arbutus, and small amounts of brush where the hillside is not too steep. It also has a network of trails and paths running along the hillside in a switchback fashion to accommodate for the steep slopes. The majority of the hill is a regional park, and contains small picnic area, dog park, a dirt jump park at the base for bicycle riders, and picnic areas on both sides of the summit. From the top, there are views of the Cowichan Valley, Saanich Peninsula and Gulf Islands. The hill is mostly common rock, with a small amount of limestone and granite, and a layer of topsoil that is deep enough to support the large trees near and on the hill. The hill is within easy walking distance of the town centre and the nearby train and bus stations.

== See also ==
- Cobble Hill, British Columbia
- Cowichan Valley
