= HMCS Cowichan (MCB 162) =

Royal Canadian Navy Minesweeper

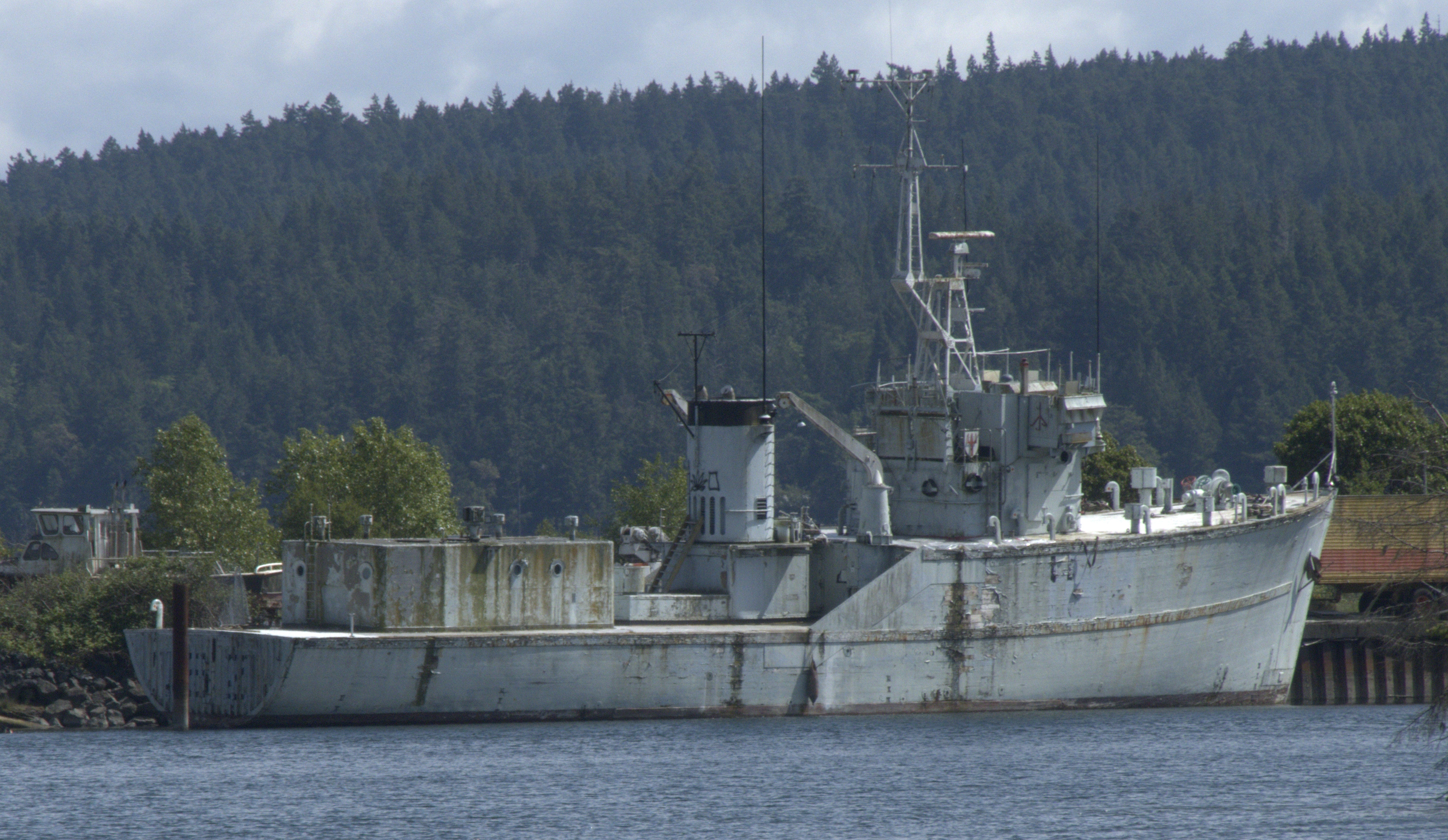
- Cowichan seen derelict in 2014 near Sooke

History

Canada
- Name: Cowichan
- Namesake: Cowichan Bay
- Builder: Yarrows Ltd., Esquimalt
- Laid down: 10 July 1956
- Launched: 26 February 1957
- Commissioned: 12 December 1957
- Decommissioned: 22 August 1997
- Identification: MCB 162
- Honours and awards: Atlantic 1941–45, Normandy 1944
- Fate: Converted to yacht 1999
- Badge: On a field barry wavy argent and azure, a pale argent on which a chief's ceremonial mask traditional of the "Cowichan" type of the Salish, vert.

General characteristics
- Class & type: Bay-class minesweeper
- Displacement: 390 long tons (400 t); 412 long tons (419 t) (deep load)
- Length: 152 ft (46 m)
- Beam: 28 ft (8.5 m)
- Draught: 8 ft (2.4 m)
- Propulsion: 2 shafts, 2 GM 12-cylinder diesels, 2,400 bhp (1,800 kW)
- Speed: 16 knots (30 km/h; 18 mph)
- Range: 3,290 nmi (6,090 km; 3,790 mi) at 12 kn (22 km/h; 14 mph)
- Complement: 38
- Armament: 1 × 40 mm Bofors gun

HMCS Cowichan (hull number MCB 162) was a Bay-class minesweeper that served in the Royal Canadian Navy during the Cold War. Entering service in 1957, the minesweeper was used primarily as a training vessel on the Pacific coast of Canada. Decommissioned in 1997, the ship was sold in 1999 for conversion to a yacht.

== Design and description ==
The Bay class were designed and ordered as replacements for the Second World War-era minesweepers that the Royal Canadian Navy operated at the time. Similar to the Ton-class minesweeper, they were constructed of wood planking and aluminum framing.

Displacing 390 long tons (400 t) standard at 412 long tons (419 t) at deep load, the minesweepers were 152 ft (46 m) long with a beam of 28 ft (8.5 m) and a draught of 8 ft (2.4 m). They had a complement of 38 officers and ratings. (Note: Gardiner and Chumbley claim the complement was 40.)

The Bay-class minesweepers were powered by two GM 12-cylinder diesel engines driving two shafts creating 2,400 brake horsepower (1,800 kW). This gave the ships a maximum speed of 16 knots (30 km/h; 18 mph) and a range of 3,290 nautical miles (6,090 km; 3,790 mi) at 12 knots (22 km/h; 14 mph). The ships were armed with one 40 mm Bofors gun and were equipped with minesweeping gear.

== Operational history ==
Ordered as a replacement for sister ship, Cowichan (MCB 147) which had been transferred to the French Navy in 1954, the ship's keel was laid down on 10 July 1956 by Yarrows Ltd. at Esquimalt, British Columbia. Named for a bay located in British Columbia, Cowichan was launched on 26 February 1957. The ship was commissioned on 12 December 1957.

After commissioning, the minesweeper joined Training Group Pacific on the West Coast of Canada. In 1972, the class was re-designated patrol escorts. In 1986, the ship rammed and sank a fishing boat in heavy fog in Nanaimo Harbour, but the occupants of the fishing vessel were rescued. Cowichan's commanding officer was cleared of charges in the ensuing court martial. The vessel remained a part of the unit until being paid off on 22 August 1997. The ship was sold in May 1999 for conversion to a yacht. However, the conversion did not take place and the ship remains alongside in Sooke, British Columbia.
