= Youbou, British Columbia =

Village of Youbou
- Village
- Location on Vancouver Island
- Coordinates: 48°52′N 124°12′W
- Country: Canada
- Province: British Columbia

Government
  - Regional District Director: Pat Weaver

Population (2011)
  - Total: 966
- Time zone: UTC−07:00 (PT)
- Postal code: V0R 3E1

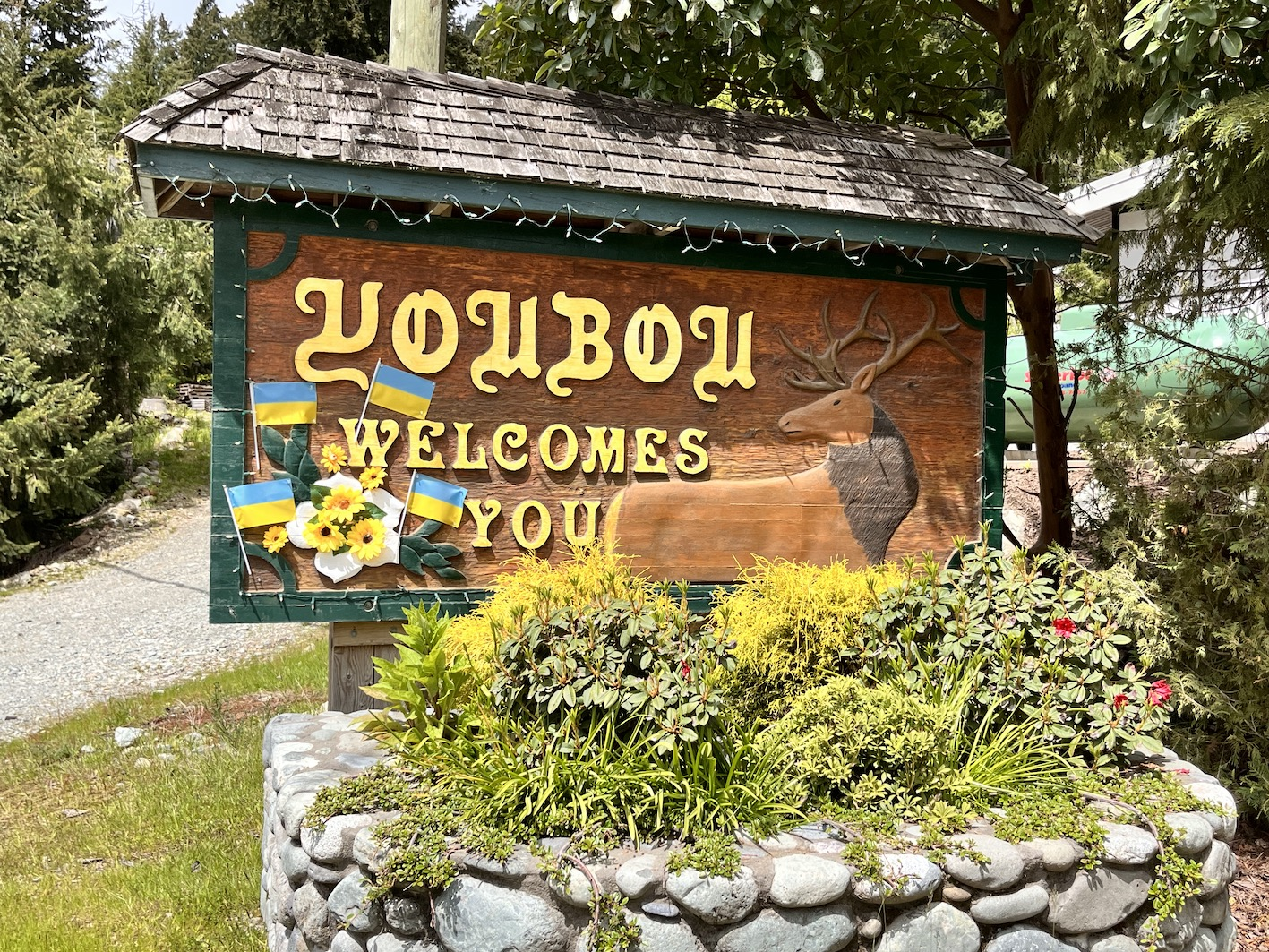

Youbou (/ˈjuːboʊ/, YOO-boh) is a community located on the north shore of Cowichan Lake, west of Duncan and a 15-minute (13 km) drive west of the community of Lake Cowichan, Canada. The former mill town on Vancouver Island provides a public beach and extensive recreational opportunities, including fishing, boating, and hiking.

Youbou is named after two employees of the Empire Lumber Company which operated the first sawmill there. Mr. Yount was the general manager and Mr. Bouton was the president.

Youbou is one of several towns in the Cowichan Valley with a significant South Asian Canadian population (primarily Sikh-Canadian) community history for over 130 years, gaining significance in the forestry industry in local sawmills from the early 20th century until the 1980s.
