= HMCS Cowichan (J146) =

History

Canada
- Name: Cowichan
- Namesake: Cowichan Valley
- Ordered: 23 February 1940
- Builder: North Vancouver Ship Repairs Ltd., North Vancouver
- Laid down: 24 April 1940
- Launched: 8 September 1940
- Commissioned: 4 July 1941
- Decommissioned: 9 October 1945
- Identification: Pennant number: J146
- Honours and awards: Atlantic 1941–1943, Normandy 1944, English Channel 1944-45
- Fate: Sold 1946 for mercantile conversion.

General characteristics
- Class & type: Bangor-class minesweeper
- Displacement: 672 long tons (683 t)
- Length: 180 ft (54.9 m) oa
- Beam: 28 ft 6 in (8.7 m)
- Draught: 9 ft 9 in (3.0 m)
- Propulsion: 2 Admiralty 3-drum water tube boilers, 2 shafts, vertical triple-expansion reciprocating engines, 2,400 ihp (1,790 kW)
- Speed: 16.5 knots (31 km/h)
- Complement: 83
- Armament: 1 × QF 4 in (102 mm)/40 cal Mk IV gun; 1 × QF 2-pounder Mark VIII; 2 × QF 20 mm Oerlikon guns; 40 depth charges as escort

HMCS Cowichan was a Bangor-class minesweeper that served in the Royal Canadian Navy during the Second World War. She saw action in the Battle of the Atlantic and the Invasion of Normandy. After the war she was sold for mercantile use. She was named for Cowichan Valley in British Columbia.

== Design and description ==
A British design, the Bangor-class minesweepers were smaller than the preceding Halcyon-class minesweepers in British service, but larger than the Fundy class in Canadian service. They came in two versions powered by different engines; those with a diesel engines and those with vertical triple-expansion steam engines. Cowichan was of the latter design and was larger than her diesel-engined cousins. Cowichan was 180 feet (54.9 m) long overall, had a beam of 28 feet 6 inches (8.7 m) and a draught of 9 feet 9 inches (3.0 m). The minesweeper had a displacement of 672 long tons (683 t). She had a complement of 6 officers and 77 enlisted.

Cowichan had two vertical triple-expansion steam engines, each driving one shaft, using steam provided by two Admiralty three-drum boilers. The engines produced a total of 2,400 indicated horsepower (1,800 kW) and gave a maximum speed of 16.5 knots (30.6 km/h; 19.0 mph). The minesweeper could carry a maximum of 150 long tons (152 t) of fuel oil.

Cowichan was armed with a single quick-firing (QF) 4-inch (102 mm)/40 caliber Mk IV gun mounted forward. This was later replaced with a 12-pounder (3 in (76 mm)) 12 cwt HA gun. (Note: The 40 calibre denotes the length of the gun. This means that the length of the gun barrel is 40 times the bore diameter. "Cwt" is the abbreviation for hundredweight, 20 cwt referring to the weight of the gun.) For anti-aircraft purposes, the minesweeper was equipped with one QF 2-pounder Mark VIII and two single-mounted QF 20 mm Oerlikon guns. The 2-pounder gun was later replaced with a powered twin 20 mm Oerlikon mount. As a convoy escort, Cowichan was deployed with 40 depth charges launched from two depth charge throwers and four chutes.

== Service history ==
Cowichan was ordered on 23 February 1940 as part of the 1939–40 shipbuilding programme. The minesweeper was laid down on 24 April 1940 by North Vancouver Ship Repairs Ltd. at North Vancouver, British Columbia and launched on 8 September later that year. The ship was commissioned into the Royal Canadian Navy on 7 April 1941 at Vancouver, British Columbia.

After commissioning, Cowichan transferred to the east coast, arriving in September 1941. She worked up at Bermuda and upon her return, was assigned to the Halifax Local Defence Force for local patrol and minesweeping duty. In January 1942, she transferred to Newfoundland Force. Cowichan was assigned to escort group 4.1.17 alongside the destroyer Assiniboine, corvettes Kenogami, Sorel, and Free French Aconit and Alysse. From 29 December 1941 to 11 January 4.1.17 escorted convoy SC 62, handing the convoy over to the British escort group B7. From 17 January to 28 January the group escorted convoy ONS 56. From 6–15 February the group escorted convoy SC 68. In September the ship was ordered to join the Western Local Escort Force (WLEF), the command charged with escorting convoys along the coast of Canada and into the United States. In early 1942, the ship's main fans were sabotaged during repairs at St. John's. The resulting investigation was faulty and was closed quietly. This was one of the first recorded attempts of crew sabotage in Royal Canadian Navy history. In January 1943, Cowichan was assigned to a WLEF escort group 24.18.7 with destroyer Annapolis and corvettes Dunvegan and Fennel.

In June 1943, WLEF divided its escorts into new groups, with Cowichan becoming a part of escort group W-6. She remained with the group until February 1944. That month she traveled to the United Kingdom as one of the Canadian escorts assigned to the naval component of the invasion of Normandy. She arrived in March and was assigned to the all-Canadian 31st Minesweeping Flotilla. Immediately preceding the D-Day invasions of 6 June 1944, the 31st Minesweeping Flotilla was tasked with mine clearance in the American sector. On 5 June, the 31st Minesweeping Flotilla arrived off Point Barfleur and began minesweeping activities at 1900. Unmolested by German shore positions, the minesweepers finished their work by 0515 on 6 June.

Cowichan remained in British waters until returning to Canada in February 1945. She underwent a refit that kept her out of action until June, when she returned to the United Kingdom. She returned home for the final time in September 1945 and was paid off on 9 October 1945 and placed in reserve at Shelburne.

=== Mercantile service ===
Following the war, Cowichan was sold in 1946 to a buyer from New York who had her converted for mercantile purposes. Acquired by Cia Naviera Icaria SA, she kept her name but was registered in Panama. In 1948, the vessel was sold to C. Moraitis. Cowichan was converted to a trawler with a gross register tonnage of 663 tons. The ship was broken up in 1950 but was kept listed until 2008. Her Greek registry was closed in 1973.

== See also ==
- List of ships of the Canadian Navy
