= Quamichan =

Traditional nation of the Coast Salish people

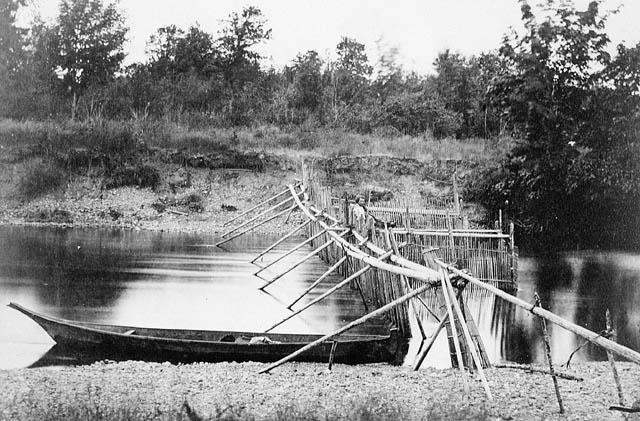
Salmon weir at Quamichan Village on the Cowichan River

Quamichan (or Kwʼamutsun) is a traditional nation of the Coast Salish people, commonly referred to by the English adaptation of Quʼwutsun ("warm place") as the Cowichan Indians, or First Nations, of the Cowichan Valley on Vancouver Island, in the area near the city of Duncan, British Columbia and Salt Spring Island, British Columbia.

The Quamichan are now part of the Cowichan Tribes band government, along with several other Cowichan-area peoples.

== History ==
At the start of the colonial era, Quamichan was the largest and wealthiest of the eight Cowichan villages in part due to the fighting prowess of chieftains such as Tzouhalem, who once led a two-day assault on the Hudson's Bay Company's Fort Victoria in 1844.

The original name of this village, kwómetsen, means 'humpback' or 'hunchback' and is derived from a character in a Cowichan story, a hunchbacked cannibal-ogress-giantess who 'kept children in a basket and placed pitch over their eyes before she ate them'. The English name is 'Quamichan.'

There are varying historical accounts of the size of the village; however, in all descriptions the Quamichan village was large. The village extended for five kilometres along the Cowichan River, stretching from one kilometre above Quamichan Creek down almost to Comiaken village. The first census after European contacts estimated 1,700 people residing in the village.

The British Colony of Vancouver Island later named the area north and west of Cowichan Bay as the Quamichan District, properly the Quamichan Land District, which is part of the cadastral survey system for land titles.

The cultural traditions of the annual Winter Dances were regarded as vibrant despite efforts by missionaries and government agents to prevent the potlatch and other events regarded as "pagan". The annual gathering of kin and village for dances and ceremonies continued into the 20th Century.

In colonial times, they subsisted by fishing, hunting, and the gathering of wild berries and roots. By the 1900s, they lived by farming, fishing, hunting and working on the railway and in canneries.

Smallpox and other diseases reduced the Quamichan population from about 1,000 people in the mid-1800s to 300 in 1901 and 260 in 1909.

== Religion ==
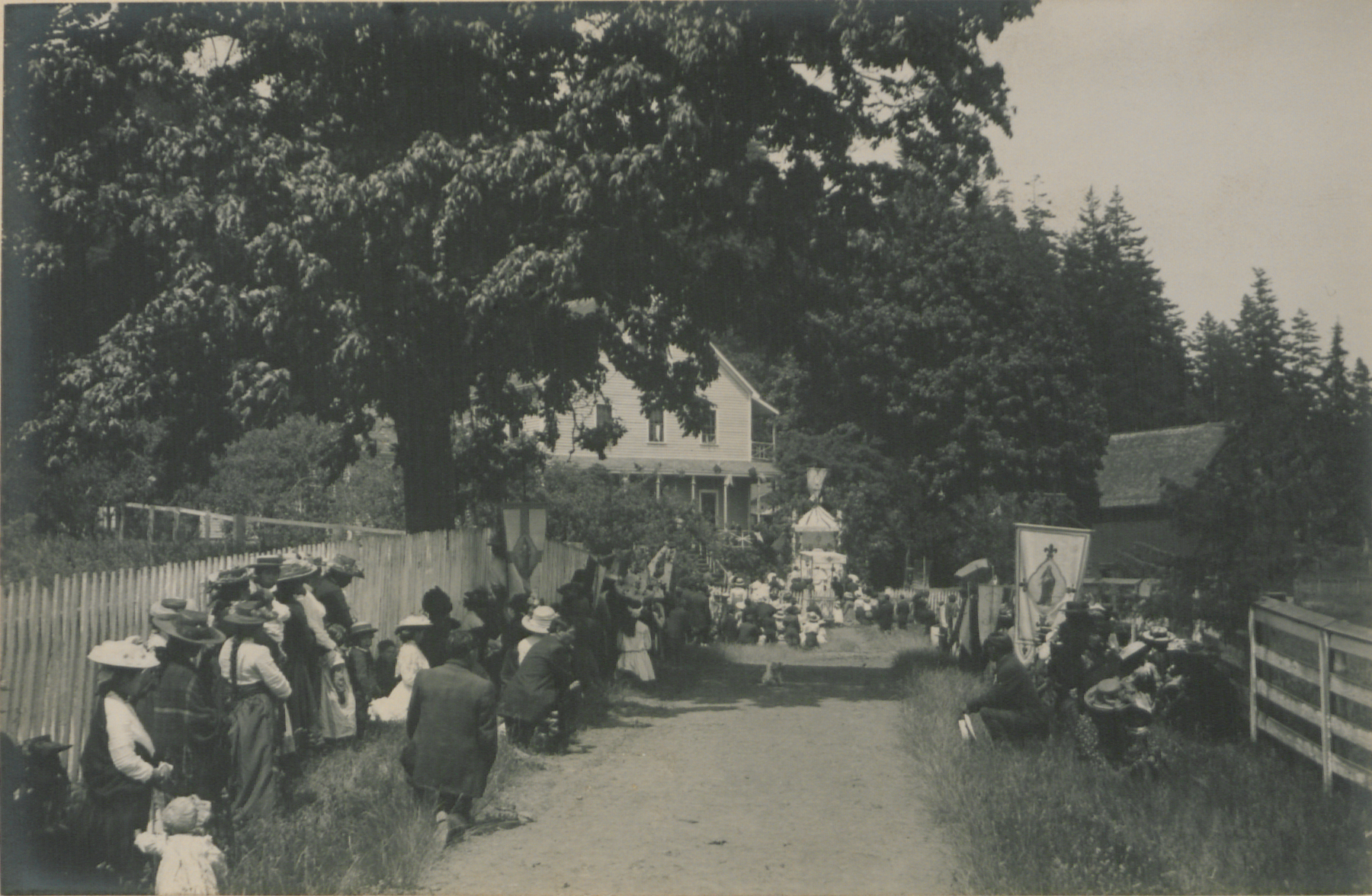
Benediction at St. Anne's Convent, Quamichan, 1912.

Catholic priests visited them as early as 1847 and more conversions occurred after the Oblate Fathers arrived in Victoria in 1857. In 1864, the Sisters of Saint Anne established the Cowichan Convent School in Quamichan for aboriginal girls. By 1909, there were 200 Catholics and 60 Methodists.
