= Arthur Vickers (artist) =

Canadian artist (b. 1947)

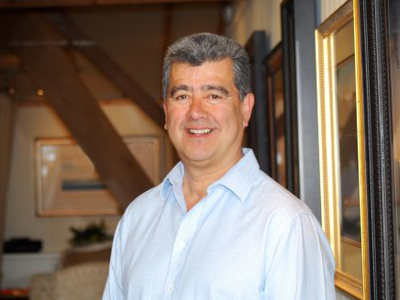
Arthur Vickers

Arthur Vickers (born in 1947), OBC is a Canadian West Coast storyteller and artist. He received the Order of British Columbia in 2008 for his charitable work fundraising.

== Artwork ==
He is especially known for his gold leaf works and is accomplished in many media, from drawing and carving to painting to printmaking. Arthur Vickers' Gallery is set in the historic, picturesque seaside village of Cowichan Bay, on Southern Vancouver Island, British Columbia.

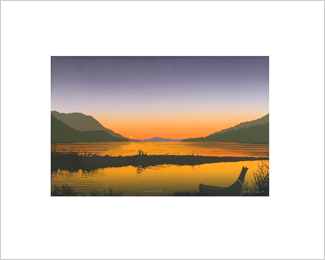
Cowichan Sunrise

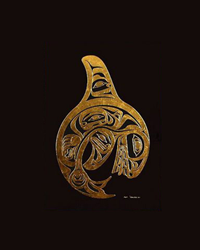
Orca

=== The Leadership Desk ===
The Leadership Desk is hand-crafted red cedar, created in the form of a bentwood box and adorned with First Nation's iconography. It was presented to the Premier of British Columbia by Arthur Vickers in October 2009 and resides permanently in the Premier's Office of British Columbia.

== Biography ==
He was born in Vancouver to a mother of English and Canadian ancestry and a father of Tsimshian and Heiltsuk lineage. He spent his childhood in the Tsimshian village of Kitkatla, where he spent much time with his grandfather, a fisherman and canoe carver.

In 2010 Vickers received the Distinguished Alumni Award from Camosun College and an honorary doctorate in fine arts from the University of Victoria in 2006.
