= Skutz Falls =

Coordinates: 48°47′00″N 123°57′00″W

Skutz Falls is a waterfall on the Cowichan River on Vancouver Island, British Columbia, Canada. It is located just above Marie Canyon. The name was originally Skwets or Squitz, meaning "waterfall" in the Cowichan dialect of Halkomelem.

When salmon are spawning, people come to the falls to see them climb up the fish ladders that were built beside the falls. Prior to the building of the fish ladder, the falls, which resemble steep rapids dropping about 20 feet, were a barrier for all fish.

In the summer, the river is very calm below the falls and people visit the area to swim or inner tube below the falls. There is also a campground nearby.

== See also ==
- List of waterfalls in British Columbia
