= HMCS Sorel =

Flower-class corvette

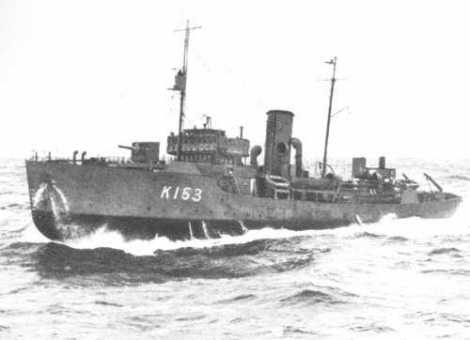
- HMCS Sorel

History

Canada
- Name: Sorel
- Namesake: Sorel, Quebec
- Ordered: 22 January 1940
- Builder: Marine Industries Ltd., Sorel
- Laid down: 24 August 1940
- Launched: 16 November 1940
- Commissioned: 19 August 1941
- Decommissioned: 22 June 1945
- Identification: Pennant number: K153
- Honours and awards: Atlantic 1941–45, North Sea 1942
- Fate: Sold to the Yugoslav Navy 16 November 1945

General characteristics
- Class & type: Flower-class corvette(original)
- Displacement: 950 long tons (970 t; 1,060 short tons)
- Length: 205 ft (62.48 m)
- Beam: 33 ft (10.06 m)
- Draught: 11.5 ft (3.51 m)
- Propulsion: Single shaft; 2 water tube boilers; 1 4-cyl. triple expansion steam engine, 2,750 hp (2,050 kW)
- Speed: 16 knots (29.6 km/h)
- Range: 3,450 nmi (6,390 km; 3,970 mi) at 12 kn (22 km/h; 14 mph)
- Complement: 6 officers, 79 enlisted
- Sensors & processing systems: Radar – SW1C or 2C (later); Sonar – Type 123A, later Type 127DV
- Armament: 1 × BL 4 in (102 mm) Mk.IX single gun; 2 .50 cal machine gun twin; 2 Lewis .303 cal mg twin; 2 Mk.II depth charge throwers; 2 depth charge rails with 40 depth charges.; Originally fitted with minesweeping gear, later removed.

HMCS Sorel was a Flower-class corvette that served with the Royal Canadian Navy during the Second World War. She served primarily in the Battle of the Atlantic as an ocean escort. She is named for Sorel, Quebec.

== Background ==
Flower-class corvettes like Sorel serving with the Royal Canadian Navy during the Second World War were different from earlier and more traditional sail-driven corvettes. The "corvette" designation was created by the French for classes of small warships; the Royal Navy borrowed the term for a period but discontinued its use in 1877. During the hurried preparations for war in the late 1930s, Winston Churchill reactivated the corvette class, needing a name for smaller ships used in an escort capacity, in this case based on a whaling ship design. The generic name "flower" was used to designate the class of these ships, which – in the Royal Navy – were named after flowering plants.

Corvettes commissioned by the Royal Canadian Navy during the Second World War were named after communities for the most part, to better represent the people who took part in building them. This idea was put forth by Admiral Percy W. Nelles. Sponsors were commonly associated with the community for which the ship was named. Royal Navy corvettes were designed as open sea escorts, while Canadian corvettes were developed for coastal auxiliary roles which was exemplified by their minesweeping gear. Eventually the Canadian corvettes would be modified to allow them to perform better on the open seas.

== Construction ==
Sorel was ordered on 22 January 1940 as part of the 1939–1940 Flower-class building program. She was laid down by Marine Industries Ltd. at Sorel, Quebec on 24 August 1940 and launched 16 November later that year. She was commissioned at Sorel on 19 August 1941.

Sorel had three major refits during her career. Her first took place after developing mechanical defects while on escort duty. She spent ten weeks beginning in January 1942 at Leith repairing. The second major overhaul took place between October 1942 and February 1943. It began at Liverpool, Nova Scotia but she was eventually transferred to Pictou and Halifax for completion. The final refit began in November 1943 and took until 31 March 1944 to complete. During this refit, begun at Halifax and completed at Dartmouth, Sorel had her fo'c'sle extended.

== Service history ==
After arriving at Halifax for deployment, Sorel joined Sydney Force initially. In November 1941 she transferred to Newfoundland Command and became an ocean escort, protecting convoys between St. John's and Iceland. On her second convoy she developed mechanical problems and continued on to the United Kingdom for repairs in January 1942. She returned to service briefly as an ocean escort in April 1942.

In May 1942, Sorel joined the Western Local Escort Force (WLEF). She left the force in October 1942 after departing for a major refit. After workups, she became a training ship in February 1943. She was posted at Digby, St. Margaret's and Pictou for training purposes. In September 1943, she was temporarily assigned to Mid-Ocean Escort Force escort group C-3 before undergoing another refit beginning in November 1943.

After returning to service in mid-1944 she was posted to the Western Escort Force escort group W-4. She remained with this unit for the rest of the war.

Paid off on 22 Jun 1945, she was sold to the Yugoslav Navy on 16 Nov 1945. While manned by a Yugoslav crew, she ran aground on the southern point of Henry Island on 13 Dec 1945.
