= Cowichan Valley Regional District =

Regional district in British Columbia, Canada

Cowichan Valley
- Regional district
- Cowichan Valley Regional District
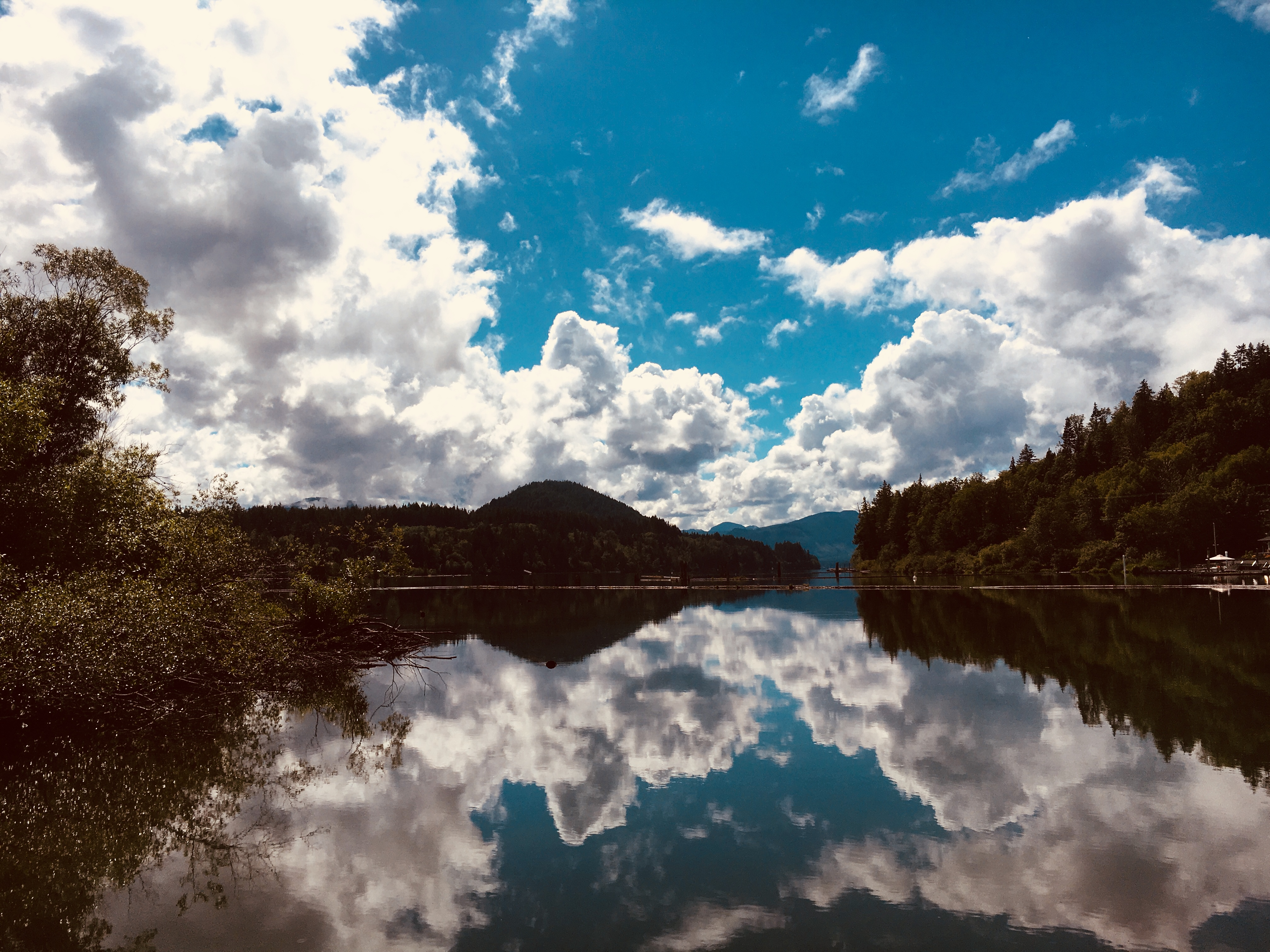
- Cowichan Lake

- Logo

- Location in British Columbia
- Country: Canada
- Province: British Columbia
- Administrative office location: Duncan

Government
  - Type: Regional district
  - Body: Board of directors
  - Chair: Kate Segall
  - Vice chair: Tim McGonigle
  - Electoral areas: A – Mill Bay/Malahat; B – Shawnigan Lake; C – Cobble Hill; D – Cowichan Bay; E – Cowichan Station/Sahtlam/Glenora; F – Cowichan Lake South/Skutz Falls; G – Saltair/Gulf Islands; H – North Oyster/Diamond; I – Youbou/Meade Creek

Area
  - Land: 3,474.52 km^{2} (1,341.52 sq mi)

Population (2021)
  - Total: 89,013
  - Density: 25.6/km^{2} (66/sq mi)
- Website: www.cvrd.ca

The Cowichan Valley Regional District is a regional district in the Canadian province of British Columbia that is on the southern part of Vancouver Island, bordered by the Nanaimo and Alberni-Clayoquot Regional Districts to the north and northwest, and by the Capital Regional District to the south and east. As of the 2021 Census, the Regional District had a population of 89,013. The regional district offices are in Duncan.

The current Chair of the Cowichan Valley Regional District is Kate Segall

== Geography ==
The Cowichan Valley Regional District covers an area between the Stuart Channel and Saanich Inlet on the east coast of Vancouver Island and the southern part of the West Coast Trail, with Cowichan Lake and Cowichan Valley proper located in its central region. It includes the Gulf Islands of Thetis, Penelakut and Valdes. The total land area is 3,473.12 km^{2} (1,340.98 sq mi).

== Communities ==
=== Incorporated communities ===
- City of Duncan – pop. 5,047
- Town of Ladysmith – pop. 8,990
- Town of Lake Cowichan – pop. 3,325
- District Municipality of North Cowichan – pop. 31,990

=== Indigenous Reserves ===
- Chemainus 13
- Claoose 4
- Cowichan 1
- Cowichan 9
- Cowichan Lake
- Est-Patrolas 4
- Halalt 2
- Kil-pah-las 3
- Kuper Island 7
- Lyacksun 3
- Malachan 11
- Malahat 11
- Oyster Bay 12
- Portier Pass 5
- Shingle Point 4
- Squaw-hay-one 11
- Theik 2
- Tsussie 6
- Wyah 3

=== Electoral areas ===
==== A ====
- Malahat
- Mill Bay

==== B ====
- Shawnigan Lake

==== C ====
- Arbutus Ridge
- Cobble Hill
- Cherry Point

==== D ====
- Cowichan Bay

==== E ====
- Cowichan Station
- Eagle Heights
- Glenora
- Koksilah
- Sahtlam

==== F ====
- Honeymoon Bay
- Mesachie Lake
- Skutz Falls

==== G ====
- Saltair

==== H ====
- Diamond
- North Oyster
- Yellow Point

==== I ====
- Meade Creek
- Youbou

== Demographics ==
As a census division in the 2021 Census of Population conducted by Statistics Canada, the Cowichan Valley Regional District had a population of 89,013 living in 37,290 of its 40,174 total private dwellings, a change of 6.3% from its 2016 population of 83,739. With a land area of 3,472.48 km^{2} (1,340.73 sq mi), it had a population density of 25.6/km^{2} (66.4/sq mi) in 2021.

Panethnic groups in the Cowichan Valley Regional District (1986–2021)
Panethnic group	2021		2016		2011		2006		2001		1996		1991		1986	
Panethnic group	Pop.	%	Pop.	%	Pop.	%	Pop.	%	Pop.	%	Pop.	%	Pop.	%	Pop.	%
European (Note: Statistic includes all persons that did not make up part of a visible minority or an indigenous identity.)	71,460	81.83%	68,415	83.55%	66,975	85.13%	65,875	86.14%	62,275	87.32%	62,445	88.54%	52,955	88.09%	46,080	88.57%
Indigenous	10,985	12.58%	9,660	11.8%	8,525	10.84%	7,420	9.7%	6,260	8.78%	5,655	8.02%	5,110	8.5%	4,025	7.74%
South Asian	1,295	1.48%	1,260	1.54%	1,150	1.46%	1,440	1.88%	1,360	1.91%	1,235	1.75%	1,155	1.92%	1,380	2.65%
East Asian (Note: Statistic includes total responses of "Chinese", "Korean", and "Japanese" under visible minority section on census.)	1,280	1.47%	1,025	1.25%	880	1.12%	765	1%	665	0.93%	655	0.93%	405	0.67%	350	0.67%
Southeast Asian (Note: Statistic includes total responses of "Filipino" and "Southeast Asian" under visible minority section on census.)	905	1.04%	715	0.87%	655	0.83%	520	0.68%	300	0.42%	190	0.27%	175	0.29%	55	0.11%
African	630	0.72%	305	0.37%	185	0.24%	160	0.21%	215	0.3%	190	0.27%	140	0.23%	65	0.12%
Latin American	265	0.3%	150	0.18%	100	0.13%	95	0.12%	65	0.09%	30	0.04%	30	0.05%	35	0.07%
Middle Eastern (Note: Statistic includes total responses of "West Asian" and "Arab" under visible minority section on census.)	140	0.16%	130	0.16%	35	0.04%	75	0.1%	75	0.11%	70	0.1%	145	0.24%	35	0.07%
Other (Note: Statistic includes total responses of "Visible minority, n.i.e." and "Multiple visible minorities" under visible minority section on census.)	375	0.43%	225	0.27%	160	0.2%	130	0.17%	95	0.13%	50	0.07%	—N/a	—N/a	—N/a	—N/a
Total responses	87,330	98.11%	81,885	97.79%	78,675	97.94%	76,475	99.41%	71,315	99.05%	70,525	99.36%	60,115	99.27%	52,025	99.16%
Total population	89,013	100%	83,739	100%	80,332	100%	76,929	100%	71,998	100%	70,978	100%	60,560	100%	52,466	100%

- Note: Totals greater than 100% due to multiple origin responses.
