= Cowichan Tribes =

First Nation band in British Columbia

- Band No. 642
- Quwʼutsun
- People: Quamichan; Clemclemaluts; Comiaken; Khenipsen; Kilpahlas; Koksilah; Somena
- Headquarters: Duncan
- Province: British Columbia

Land
- Main reserve: Cowichan 1, 9
- Reserves: Theik 2; Kil-pah-las 3; Est-Patrolas 4; Tzart-lam 5; Kakalatza 6; Skutz 7, 8
- Land area: 24.26 km^{2} (9.37 sq mi)

Population (2025)
- On reserve: 2659
- On other land: 336
- Off reserve: 2619
- Total population: 5614

Government
- Chief: Cindy Daniels

Tribal Council
- Hulʼqumiʼnum Treaty Group

Website
- cowichantribes.com

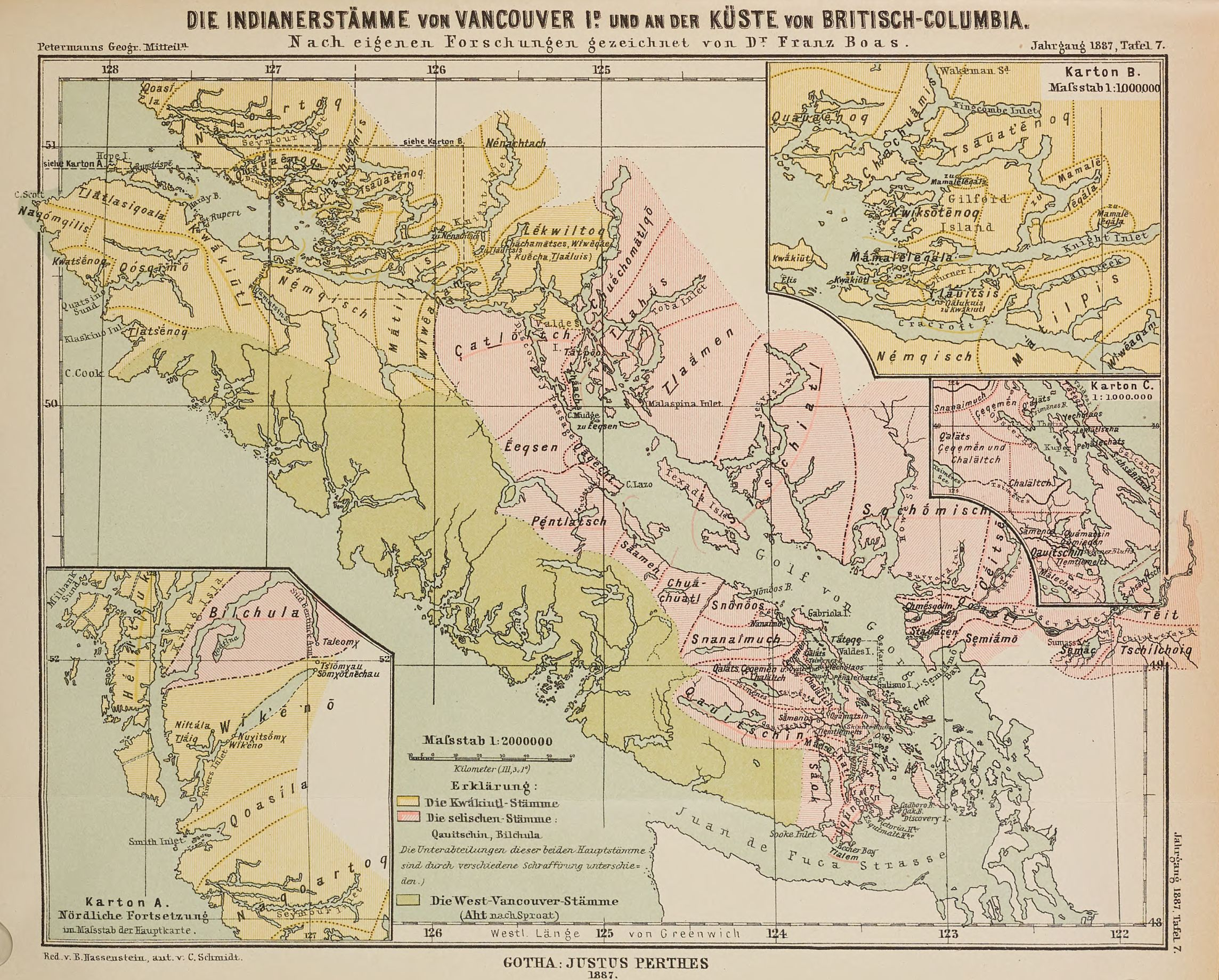
Dr. Franz Boas 1887 map showing Cowichan territories

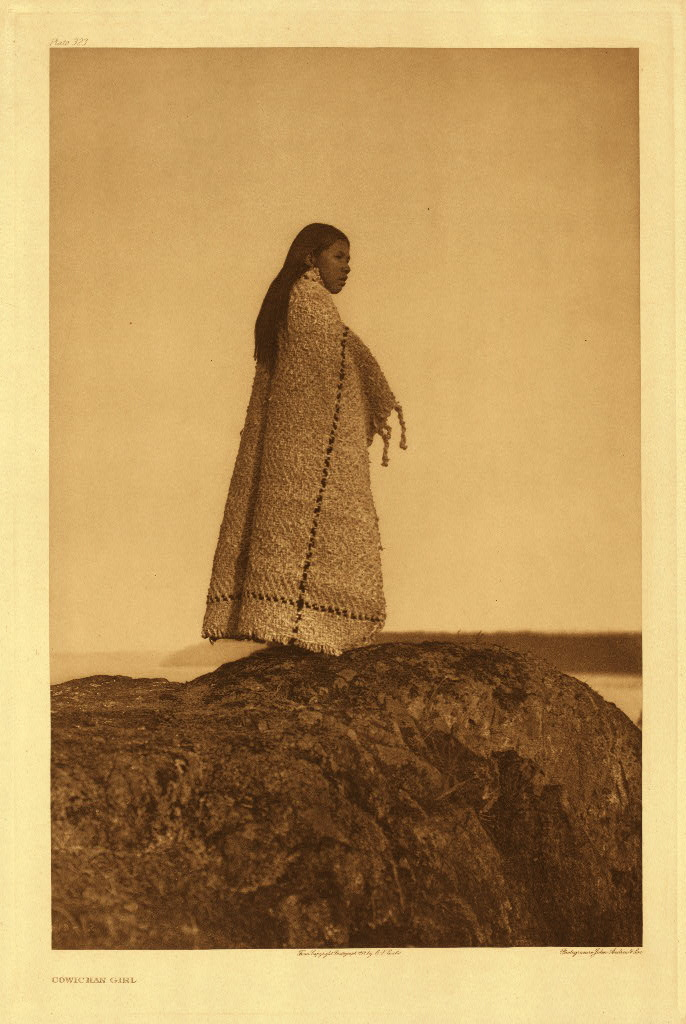
Cowichan girl, 1913 (Edward Curtis).

Cowichan Tribes (Halkomelem: Quwʼutsun) is the band government of the Cowichan, a group of Coast Salish peoples who live in the Cowichan Valley region on Vancouver Island. With over 3,800 registered members, it is the single largest First Nations band in British Columbia.

When the band was created pursuant to the Indian Act, seven nearby peoples were amalgamated into one "band." The Quamichan/Kwʼamutsun are the largest cultural group, but the nation also includes Clemclemaluts (Lʼumlʼumuluts), Comiaken (Qwumʼyiqunʼ), Khenipsen (Hinupsum), Kilpahlas (Tlʼulpalus), Koksilah (Hwulqwselu), and Somena (Sʼamunaʼ).

== Tribal area ==
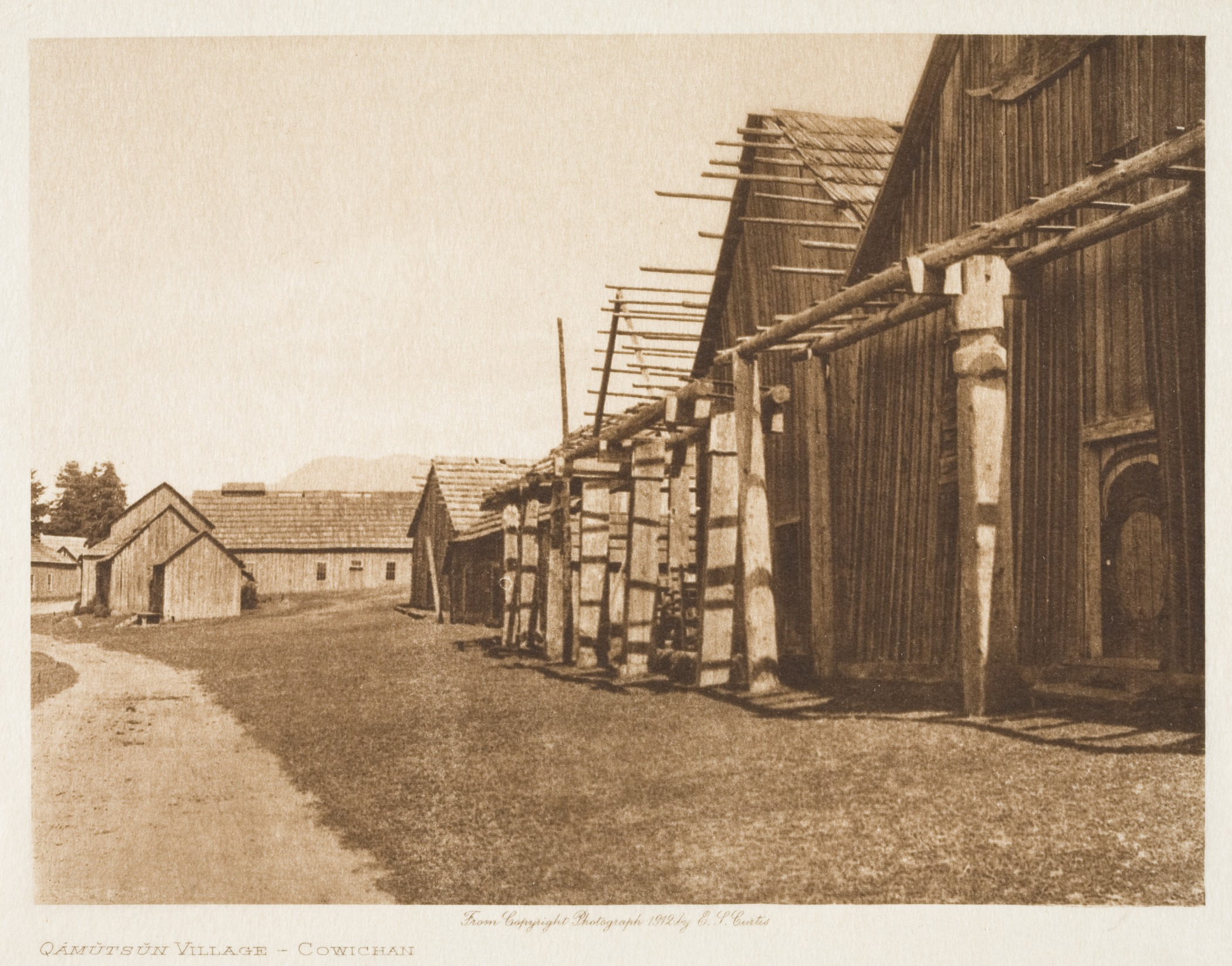
Qumutsun Village, 1912 (Edward Curtis).

The traditional territory of the Cowichan people covered the entire Cowichan Valley, the surrounding area around Cowichan Lake, Shawnigan Lake, and extended into the Gulf Islands and the Fraser River. The lower reaches of the Cowichan Valley, particularly the area stretching from the present location of Duncan down to Cowichan Bay (and including the lower Koksilah River), was the most heavily settled.

Today, the total reserve area is currently 24 square kilometres (5,900 acres), made up of nine Reserves, with Core Traditional Territory of approximately 3,750 square kilometres (900,000 acres). The tribe comprises seven traditional villages:

1. Quamichan (Halkomelem: Kwaʼmutsun)
2. Comiaken (Halkomelem: Qwum'yiqun')
3. Koksilah (Halkomelem: Xwulqwʼselu)
4. Somena (Halkomelem: Sʼamunu)
5. Clemclemluts (Halkomelem: Lhumlhumulutsʼ)
6. Khenipsen (Halkomelem: Xinupsum)
7. Cowichan Bay (Halkomelem: Tlʼulpalus)

In August 2025, the Cowichan Tribes v. Canada ruling by the Supreme Court of British Columbia gave the Cowichan Tribes Aboriginal title over a portion of Lulu Island in Richmond, British Columbia. This land is adjacent to the Fraser River, a portion of which the court ruled they have fishing rights over.

== History ==
=== Raiding and captive-taking (18th–19th centuries) ===
Prior to and during early contact with Europeans, the Cowichan (Quw’utsun) engaged in maritime raiding and captive-taking as part of inter-tribal warfare and resource competition. Warriors in large war canoes sometimes travelled long distances to attack other villages, seize goods, and capture people for enslavement or ransom.

In approximately 1825, a coalition of Puget Sound tribes led by Chief Kitsap of the Suquamish confronted Cowichan raiders near Dungeness Spit after the Cowichan had previously conducted raids in the Puget Sound region. Such raids were part of a wider network of conflict and exchange in which captives were taken, incorporated into households, traded, or used as labour. Slavery among the Cowichan was a recognized social institution before European contact.

Some historical and legal records describe the Cowichan’s regional influence as partly derived from their ability to project power through raids on upriver and coastal groups. For example, in 1808, explorer Simon Fraser was warned by other tribes that Cowichan ruled most of the territory between the Fraser River and the Pacific Ocean. As British and colonial authority expanded in the mid-19th century, inter-tribal warfare and slavery were gradually suppressed through new laws, missionary influence, and shifting economic systems. By 1912, the Cowichan Nation's population had fallen to around 500.

== Land and reserves ==
The Cowichan Tribes hold several reserves in the Cowichan Valley region of Vancouver Island:

- Cowichan 1, Cowichan District — 8 parcels of land (Quamichan District), 2292.70 ha. 48.77404215°N 123.707645°W
- Theik 2 (Halkomelem: Thiq), Cowichan District — On south shore of Cowichan Bay, east coast of Vancouver Island, 30.3 ha. 48.7422724°N 123.6378442°W
- Kil-pah-las 3 (Halkomelem: Tlʼlulpalus), Cowichan District Sec 6 Rge 5 — On south shore of Cowichan Bay, 20.6 ha. 48.73882310°N 123.61199826°W
- Est-Patrolas 4 (Halkomelem: Quliʼlum), Shawnigan District — 2 miles south of Cowichan Bay, 27.8 ha. 48.71389365°N 123.60735117°W
- Tzart-lam 5 (Halkomelem: Tsʼalhaʼum), Sahtlam District — On left bank of Cowichan River, 6.5 ha. 48.75975264°N 123.8302581°W
- Kakalatza 6 (Halkomelem: Quyxuletseʼ), Sahtlam District — On left bank of Cowichan River, 8.0 ha. 48.76890015°N 123.87537275°W
- Skutz 7 (Halkomelem: Skwutz), Cowichan Lake District — On left bank of Cowichan River at Skutz Canyon, 7.3 ha. 48.7781218°N 123.9454441°W
- Skutz 8 (Halkomelem: Skwutz), Cowichan Lake District — At head of Skutz Canyon, 14.9 ha. 48.78204736°N 123.9531648°W
- Cowichan 9, Cowichan District — Near mouth of Koksilah River at head of Cowichan Bay, 17.9 ha. 48.75744022°N 123.65459788°W

== Governance ==
Cowichan Tribes is governed by an elected band council consisting of a chief and 12 councilors, within the framework of the Indian Act. It is part of the Hulʼqumiʼnum Treaty Group which is currently at Stage 4 (Agreement in Principle) of the British Columbia Treaty Process.

The band is responsible for providing social programmes for children and families, education, health, housing, and social development.

== Tribal-owned businesses ==
Cowichan Tribes currently owns and operates Khowutzun Development Corporation (KDC) group of companies, which includes the following subsidiaries with a combined 2004 revenue of $60 million:

- Khowutzun Mustimuhw Contractors Limited Partnership (KMCLP)
- Khowutzun Forest Services Limited Partnership (KFCLP)
- Khowutzun Millwork & Joinery Limited Partnership (KMJLP)
- Quwʼutsun Cultural and Conference Centre (QCCC)

Cowichan Tribes are also known for a distinctive type of knitting, most especially Cowichan sweaters.
