= HMCS Cowichan (MCB 147) =

Canadian Navy minesweeper

History

Canada
- Name: Cowichan
- Namesake: Cowichan Bay
- Builder: Davie Shipbuilding, Lauzon
- Laid down: 20 June 1951
- Launched: 12 November 1951
- Commissioned: 10 December 1953
- Decommissioned: 31 March 1954
- Identification: MCB 147
- Honours and awards: Atlantic 1941–45, Normandy 1944
- Fate: Transferred to French Navy 1954
- Badge: On a field barry wavy argent and azure, a pale argent on which a chief's ceremonial mask traditional of the "Cowichan" type of the Salish, vert.

France
- Name: La Malouine
- Acquired: 7 April 1954
- Stricken: 1977
- Identification: P 651
- Fate: Sunk as target 1985

General characteristics
- Class & type: Bay-class minesweeper
- Displacement: 390 long tons (400 t); 412 long tons (419 t) (deep load)
- Length: 152 ft (46 m)
- Beam: 28 ft (8.5 m)
- Draught: 8 ft (2.4 m)
- Propulsion: 2 shafts, 2 GM 12-cylinder diesels, 2,400 bhp (1,800 kW)
- Speed: 16 knots (30 km/h; 18 mph)
- Range: 3,290 nmi (6,090 km; 3,790 mi) at 12 kn (22 km/h; 14 mph)
- Complement: 38
- Armament: 1 x 40 mm Bofors gun

HMCS Cowichan (hull number MCB 147) was a Bay-class minesweeper that served in the Royal Canadian Navy during the Cold War. The minesweeper entered service in 1953 and was transferred to the French Navy in 1954. Renamed La Malouine, the ship was converted to a territorial patrol vessel in 1973 and remained in service until 1977. La Malouine was sunk as a target ship in 1985.

== Design and description ==
The Bay class were designed and ordered as replacements for the Second World War-era minesweepers that the Royal Canadian Navy operated at the time. Similar to the Ton-class minesweeper, they were constructed of wood planking and aluminum framing.

Displacing 390 long tons (400 t) standard at 412 long tons (419 t) at deep load, the minesweepers were 152 ft (46 m) long with a beam of 28 ft (8.5 m) and a draught of 8 ft (2.4 m). They had a complement of 38 officers and ratings. (Note: Gardiner and Chumbley claim the complement was 40.)

The Bay-class minesweepers were powered by two GM 12-cylinder diesel engines driving two shafts creating 2,400 brake horsepower (1,800 kW). This gave the ships a maximum speed of 16 knots (30 km/h; 18 mph) and a range of 3,290 nautical miles (6,090 km; 3,790 mi) at 12 knots (22 km/h; 14 mph). The ships were armed with one 40 mm Bofors gun and were equipped with minesweeping gear.

== Operational history ==
The ship's keel was laid down on 20 June 1951 by Davie Shipbuilding at their yard in Lauzon, Quebec. Named for a bay located in British Columbia, Cowichan was launched on 12 November 1951. The ship was commissioned on 10 December 1953.

Cowichan remained in service for only a few months with the Royal Canadian Navy as the vessel was paid off on 31 March 1954. The minesweeper was transferred to the French Navy on 7 April 1954 and renamed La Malouine. She served as a minesweeper until 1973 when the minesweeping gear was removed and La Malouine transferred to the Pacific Ocean for duty as an overseas territories patrol vessel. La Malouine served until 1977. The ship was used as a target ship and sunk on 25 February 1985.
