= Cowichan River =

River in British Columbia, Canada

Coordinates: 48°46′N 123°38′W

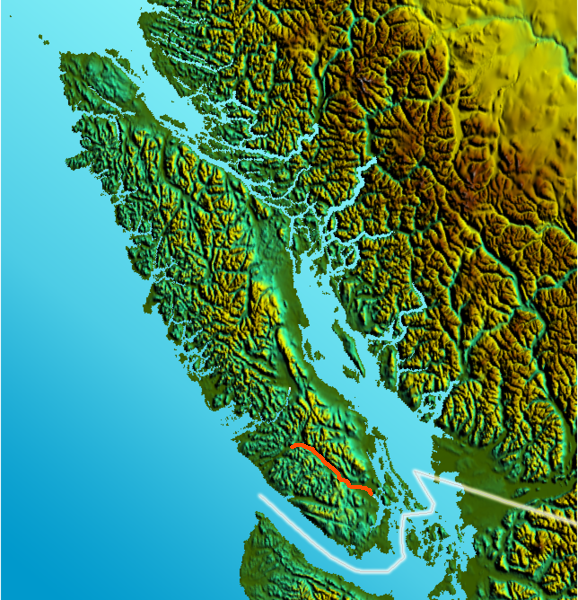
Location map of Cowichan River (Cowichan Lake included)

The Cowichan River /ˈkoʊ.ɪtʃən/ is a Canadian Heritage River on Vancouver Island, in British Columbia, Canada. Its headwater is Cowichan Lake. The river flows east over Skutz Falls and through Marie Canyon towards its mouth at Cowichan Bay. The river's drainage basin is 795 square kilometres (307 sq mi) in size.

The Cowichan River is the centre of a provincial park, Cowichan River Provincial Park, on southern Vancouver Island. The park is home to hundreds of animal species, including the native and endangered Vancouver Island ermine and more than 200 species of birds.

The river is the namesake of Cowichan Herald Extraordinary at the Canadian Heraldic Authority.

In the decade leading up to 2014, water levels dropped to the point that it "required the trucking of fish up the river," and the Cowichan Valley Regional District instituted water restrictions for residents.

Water from the river is used in the pulp and paper mill operated by Catalyst Paper in Crofton.

The Cowichan river is regarded as one of the premier fly fishing destinations in Canada. Voted the second best fly fishing destination in Canada by the world’s largest online travel fishing company, FishingBooker. With an abundance of species, including rainbow and brown trout, 3 pacific salmon species and the infamous steelhead, it is understandable why it attracts fly anglers from around the world.

https://www.surreynowleader.com/news/cowichan-river-no-2-fishing-destination-in-canada-in-2024-7300527

Thanks to the efforts and collaboration between The Department of Fisheries and Oceans, Cowichan Tribes and conservation/stewardship organizations, the Cowichan River chinook have made a remarkable recovery. In 2009, only a few hundred Cowichan chinook returned to the river. Since that time, a resurgence of the species has occurred, culminating with historically high Cowichan chinook returns in 2022, 2023 and 2024.

https://cowichanwatershedboard.ca/wp-content/uploads/2024/09/2024-Cowichan-Bulletin-1_Sept13.pdf

https://cheknews.ca/waves-of-spawning-chinook-salmon-reverse-trend-on-cowichan-river-502351/

In July 2023, in the midst of a summer drought, the Cowichan River experienced a fish kill event. The investigation conducted by the Government of British Columbia found that downstream of the wastewater outflow, dangerous levels of nutrients were found along with floating brown algae. The Town of Lake Cowichan’s sewage treatment facility was found to have been outside of the regulatory requirements for wastewater discharge on multiple occasions that same year. A $700 fine was issued. "Penalty for failure to comply with Permit 247 Section 3.4(a) (Analysis) and Section 6.3 (Noncompliance Reporting of Toxicity)" "Penalty for failure to comply with the Act, regulations, terms of permit, or orders issued under this Act" https://nrced.gov.bc.ca/records;autofocus=64bffd63824ecf00222f746f "River discharge in the Cowichan River was low (approximately 4.5 m3/second) at the time of the fish kill, leading to concern that low effluent dilution, combined with high temperatures and potentially irregular effluent quality, may have led to the mortality event." "BC Fisheries staff described the Town of Lake Cowichan effluent discharge as "green and goopy" in July 2023 surveys, contrary to previous years of fisheries surveys where the effluent was described as "watery coffee" in appearance. "Though green algae are not uncommon to observe downstream of the effluent discharge, in July 2023 patches of dense filamentous green algal growth were observed downstream of the lagoon effluent discharge pipe for about one kilometer; ...green algae were replaced by thick brown algae with a "scummy" appearance just upstream of the 70.2 Mile Trestle and below some right bank tributaries (BC WLRS 2023)." https://cowichanwatershedboard.ca/wp-content/uploads/2018/03/Cowichan-CSI-Ken-Ashley-slidedeck-Oct-21-2024-v-5-final.pdf

== See also ==
- List of rivers of British Columbia
- Cowichan Valley
- Cowichan Tribes
- Lake Cowichan, a settlement at the origin of the Cowichan River
