= Mesachie Lake =

Coordinates: 48.80839°N 124.124393°W

Mesachie Lake is an unincorporated community in the Cowichan Valley region of Vancouver Island, British Columbia, Canada. It lies on the south shore of Cowichan Lake, British Columbia. The name is from the Chinook Jargon for "bad, evil, naughty". It was founded in 1942 by the Hillcrest Lumber Company, which built houses for its workers and their families. This company also planted many non-native fruit and shade trees which have since been given heritage status.

In 1942, houses from Sahtlam were cut into pieces and shipped via rail cars and then reassembled in Mesachie Lake with most houses there today having at least part of the original houses still being used.

The mill was completely new in design, with more efficient modern equipment. The powerhouse was completed and the generators installed. The powerhouse was able to produce enough power not only for the mill and the community, but on occasion supplied the village of Lake Cowichan when its own plant was overloaded or broken down.

In 1982, Camp Imadene bought the old Hillcrest site and moved their camp in a decade later.

Mesachie Lake is still a vibrant community, although the school and church have been moved to Lake Cowichan. The Mesachie Skydome is home to many ball tournaments. The community hall hosts various events throughout the year. The town has its own post office and public boat launch. The original Hillcrest Lumber Company office is now a private residence, along with all of the houses once owned by workers at the mill.

Mesachie Lake is also one of several towns in the Cowichan Valley with significant South Asian Canadian (primarily Sikh-Canadian) community history for over 130 years, gaining notoriety in the forestry industry at local sawmills from the early 20th century until the 1980s.

== See also ==
- List of Chinook Jargon placenames
