= Cobble Hill, British Columbia =

Cobble Hill
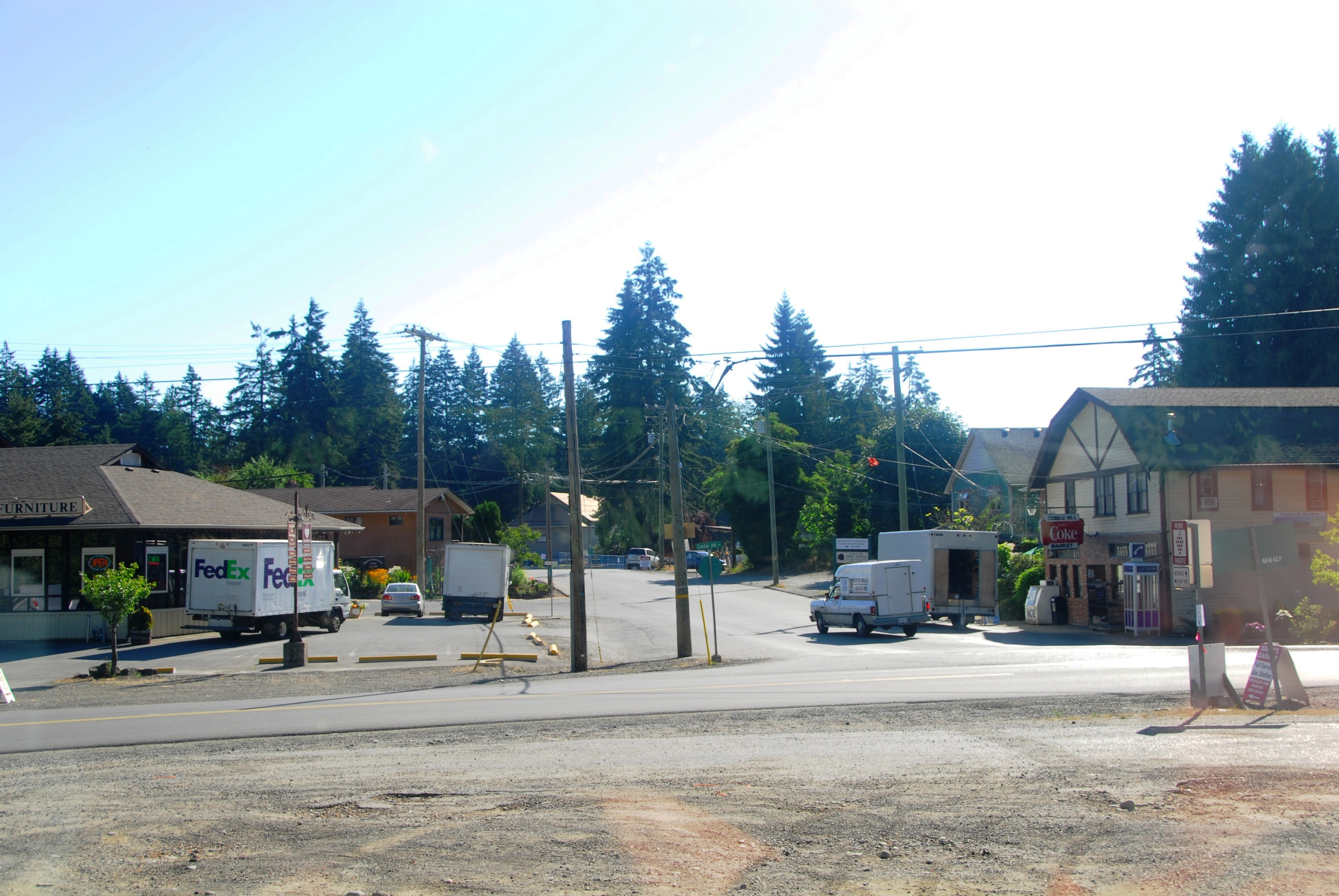
- Center of Cobble Hill

- Location of Cobble Hill on Vancouver Island
- Coordinates: 48°41′N 123°36′W
- Country: Canada
- Province: British Columbia

Population (2021)
  - Total: 3,610
- Time zone: UTC−07:00 (PT)
- Postal code: V8H & V0R 1L0

Cobble Hill is a small community on Vancouver Island, British Columbia, Canada. It is located approximately 45 kilometres (28 mi) north of Victoria on Highway 1 in the Cowichan Valley Regional District, and is known for its agricultural surroundings, and for Cobble Hill itself, which gave the village its name. According to the 2021 census, there are 3,610 people living in Cobble Hill.

The town features many hiking trails and paths cover the hills and forests of this area, which is well known for its mountain biking opportunities. More recently the area has become famous for its vineyards, which have won awards for their wines. The settlement was served by the Via Rail Victoria – Courtenay train until suspended indefinitely in 2011. The Island Rail Corridor passes through the area.

The village centre contains basic shops and services including a post office, pub, coffee shop and a small grocery store. The village centre also has a couple of parks, a dog park, community centre and an independent school (K-7).

Parts of the 1994 version of Little Women from the novel by Louisa May Alcott were filmed in the village. Some scense from the 2022 TV series Keep Breathing were shot in Cobble Hill.

== Notable residents ==
- Frances Oldham Kelsey - FDA pharmacologist. Kelsey was most famous as the reviewer for the U.S. Food and Drug Administration (FDA) who refused to authorize thalidomide for market because she had concerns about the drug's safety. Her concerns proved to be justified when it was shown that thalidomide caused serious birth defects.

== See also ==
- Kinsol Trestle
- Arbutus Ridge Seaside Community for Active Adults
