= Lake Cowichan =

- Town
- Town of Lake Cowichan
- Location of Lake Cowichan in British Columbia Lake Cowichan (British Columbia)
- Coordinates: 48°49′33″N 124°03′15″W
- Country: Canada
- Province: British Columbia
- Regional District: Cowichan Valley
- Incorporated: 1944

Government
  - Mayor: Tim McGonigle
  - Governing body: Lake Cowichan Town Council: Carolyne Austin; Aaron Frisby; Kristine Sandhu; Lorna Vomacka
  - MP: Jeff Kibble
  - MLA: Debra Toporowski

Area
  - Total: 8.05 km^{2} (3.11 sq mi)
- Elevation: 180 m (590 ft)

Population (2021)
  - Total: 3 325
  - Density: 369.6/km^{2} (957/sq mi)
- Time zone: UTC−07:00 (PT)
- Postal code span: V0R 2G0
- Area code: +1-250
- GNBC code: JANBJ
- NTS map: 92C16 Cowichan Lake
- Website: Town of Lake Cowichan

Lake Cowichan (Nitinaht: ʕaʔk̓ʷaq c̓uubaʕsaʔtx̣) (pop. 3,325) is a town located near the eastern end of Cowichan Lake and, by highway, is a little over one hour northwest of Victoria, British Columbia. The town of Lake Cowichan was incorporated in 1944 and serves as the focal point of the Cowichan Lake Area, home to the indigenous Tsuubaa-asatx (c̓uubaʕsaʔtx̣) people. The Cowichan River flows through the middle of the town. The Cowichan River is designated as a Heritage River, and is also a popular location for tubing.

Lake Cowichan is at the western end of the Trans Canada Trail, which is the longest trail network in the world, at over 28 000 kilometres. The Vancouver Island Trail also passes through the community. Youbou, with a population of about 1 400 people; Honeymoon Bay, with a population of about 450 people, and Mesachie Lake, with a population of about 200 people, are nearby communities.

== Climate ==
Climate data for Lake Cowichan
Month	Jan	Feb	Mar	Apr	May	Jun	Jul	Aug	Sep	Oct	Nov	Dec	Year
Record high °C (°F)	14.5 (58.1)	20.0 (68.0)	22.0 (71.6)	28.0 (82.4)	35.0 (95.0)	39.0 (102.2)	40.0 (104.0)	38.0 (100.4)	39.0 (102.2)	29.5 (85.1)	19.4 (66.9)	15.0 (59.0)	40.0 (104.0)
Mean daily maximum °C (°F)	6.4 (43.5)	7.8 (46.0)	10.6 (51.1)	13.5 (56.3)	17.5 (63.5)	20.6 (69.1)	24.4 (75.9)	24.9 (76.8)	21.8 (71.2)	14.4 (57.9)	8.4 (47.1)	5.2 (41.4)	14.6 (58.3)
Daily mean °C (°F)	3.5 (38.3)	4.0 (39.2)	6.2 (43.2)	8.6 (47.5)	12.1 (53.8)	15.0 (59.0)	17.8 (64.0)	18.1 (64.6)	15.2 (59.4)	9.8 (49.6)	5.4 (41.7)	2.5 (36.5)	9.8 (49.6)
Mean daily minimum °C (°F)	0.5 (32.9)	0.2 (32.4)	1.8 (35.2)	3.6 (38.5)	6.6 (43.9)	9.3 (48.7)	11.2 (52.2)	11.2 (52.2)	8.5 (47.3)	5.1 (41.2)	2.4 (36.3)	−0.2 (31.6)	5.3 (41.5)
Record low °C (°F)	−15.0 (5.0)	−16.0 (3.2)	−9.4 (15.1)	−7.0 (19.4)	−1.5 (29.3)	1.1 (34.0)	3.0 (37.4)	2.8 (37.0)	−1.7 (28.9)	−7.0 (19.4)	−17.0 (1.4)	−16.0 (3.2)	−17.0 (1.4)
Average precipitation mm (inches)	347.0 (13.66)	226.0 (8.90)	216.2 (8.51)	137.4 (5.41)	85.4 (3.36)	57.2 (2.25)	34.7 (1.37)	40.2 (1.58)	51.7 (2.04)	213.3 (8.40)	343.2 (13.51)	295.3 (11.63)	2,047.5 (80.61)
Average rainfall mm (inches)	327.3 (12.89)	206.2 (8.12)	209.2 (8.24)	135.9 (5.35)	85.2 (3.35)	57.2 (2.25)	34.7 (1.37)	40.2 (1.58)	51.7 (2.04)	212.5 (8.37)	334.8 (13.18)	280.9 (11.06)	1,975.6 (77.78)
Average snowfall cm (inches)	19.8 (7.8)	19.8 (7.8)	7.0 (2.8)	1.5 (0.6)	0.3 (0.1)	0.0 (0.0)	0.0 (0.0)	0.0 (0.0)	0.0 (0.0)	0.8 (0.3)	8.4 (3.3)	14.4 (5.7)	72.0 (28.3)
Average precipitation days (≥ 0.2 mm)	17.1	14.0	17.0	15.8	13.2	11.0	6.6	6.1	8.0	15.0	18.0	15.3	157.1
Average rainy days (≥ 0.2 mm)	15.4	12.5	16.8	15.7	13.2	11.0	6.6	6.1	8.0	14.9	17.4	14.1	151.7
Average snowy days (≥ 0.2 cm)	3.1	2.8	1.6	0.3	0.08	0.0	0.0	0.0	0.0	0.08	1.4	2.6	12.1
Mean monthly sunshine hours	47.3	75.2	106.1	141.5	173.6	177.9	233.1	226.7	182.8	112.4	49.1	39.3	1,564.9
Percentage possible sunshine	17.4	26.3	28.8	34.5	36.7	36.9	47.8	50.9	48.2	33.4	17.8	15.2	32.8
Source: Environment Canada (sunshine)

== Demographics ==
In the 2021 Census of Population conducted by Statistics Canada, Lake Cowichan had a population of 3,325 living in 1,491 of its 1,586 total private dwellings, a change of 3.1% from its 2016 population of 3,226. With a land area of 8.24 km^{2} (3.18 sq mi), it had a population density of 403.5/km^{2} (1,045.1/sq mi) in 2021.

=== Ethnicity ===
Lake Cowichan is one of several towns in the Cowichan Valley with significant South Asian Canadian (primarily Sikh-Canadian) community history for over 130 years, gaining notoriety in the forestry industry at local sawmills from the early 20th century until the 1980s. (Note: "Youbou has historic, cultural, social and economic significance to the history of South Asian Canadians in B.C. because it was the site of a large sawmill and associated community that employed many South Asian Canadian immigrants. The site represents their contribution to the expanding resource-based economy of the province. The site of the former sawmill at Youbou is considered significant because it demonstrates the ways in which South Asian Canadians helped to build the economy of B.C. through their labour, resilience and innovation in the lumbering and sawmilling industries.") (Note: "Paldi has historical, cultural, social and spiritual value as evidence of South Asian Canadian participation in the early development of B.C., for its history of economic and cultural importance derived from South Asian Canadian success in the lumber and sawmilling industries, and for its continued importance to South Asian Canadians on Vancouver Island and across the province. Originally known as Mayo, postal authorities approved the name of Paldi for the settlement in 1936, chosen in honour of many of its workers’ home village in the Punjab region of India. With settlement beginning around 1908, Paldi is significant because the community became the centre of the South Asian Canadian forest industry in the Cowichan Valley in central Vancouver Island between the time of its establishment and the closure of its sawmill after a devastating fire in 1945. It is representative of the settlement patterns of early twentieth century immigration during which South Asians, primarily Sikhs from the Punjab region of northern India, began arriving in B.C., just as the forest industry was expanding to become a dominant force in the provincial economy.") (Note: "The historic sawmilling site of Kapoor has historical, cultural, social and archaeological significance because it illustrates the ubiquity and enterprise of South Asian Canadians in the lumber industry in B.C., and their cultural and economic contributions to the province. Established in 1928, the site of the Kapoor Lumber Company operation has historic and cultural value for its economic contribution to the lumber industry in B.C. and for its association with well-known B.C. forestry entrepreneurs Kapoor Singh Siddoo and his associate Mayo Singh, director and founder respectively, of the 1917 Mayo Lumber Company. Building on the company’s success with its mill at Paldi, Kapoor and Mayo purchased timber lands near Sooke Lake, northwest of Victoria on Vancouver Island. The railway logging operation and sawmill that became the Kapoor site is important as a testament to the success of Kapoor, Mayo and other South Asians in B.C.’s lumber industry. Typical of lumber work camps of the time, the workers lived in culturally segregated bunkhouses in a mill town that grew up adjacent to the CNR railway line. Both the town and railway station were officially named Kapoor. Operating at a time when finding employment was difficult for South Asian immigrants primarily due to economic depression—1928 to 1940—the mill was an important source of employment, housing and support for up to 300 European, Canadian, South Asian, Chinese and Japanese Canadian workers.") (Note: "Jogindar Bains Park is significant for its association with Sikh pioneer Jogindar Singh Bains, a lumber and sawmilling entrepreneur, developer and humanitarian whose work helps represent the South Asian Canadian community’s economic and social contributions to the province. The Park is valued as being representative of the South Asian pioneer experience and their accomplishments in B.C. Arriving in the province in 1932 as a 17-year-old unaccompanied minor, Jogindar Bains found work at the Kapoor sawmill operation at Leechtown near Sooke. After first opening a sawmill at nearby Bear Mountain, Jogindar Bains developed the mill at the present site on Lake Cowichan in 1956. Jogindar Bains’ small-scale, 25-employee Lake Cowichan mill was considered a model modern operation, pioneering the use of electricity and employing primarily First Nations and South Asian Canadian workers. His enterprise eventually included building supply and hardware businesses, trucking and bulldozing operations, and the development and construction of residential housing. The Park, along with its memorial plaque, is important for its recognition of a citizen who believed in Canadian values while cherishing his own spiritual and cultural legacy as a Sikh and South Asian.")

Panethnic groups in the Town of Lake Cowichan (1971−2021)
Panethnic group	2021		2016		2011		2006		2001		1996		1991		1986		1981		1971	
Panethnic group	Pop.	%	Pop.	%	Pop.	%	Pop.	%	Pop.	%	Pop.	%	Pop.	%	Pop.	%	Pop.	%	Pop.	%
European (Note: Statistic includes all persons that did not make up part of a visible minority or an indigenous identity.)	2,775	83.71%	2,785	86.49%	2,610	88.32%	2,555	86.9%	2,550	90.11%	2,700	94.57%	1,960	87.5%	1,860	85.13%	2,000	82.14%	1,910	79.09%
Indigenous	415	12.52%	310	9.63%	205	6.94%	230	7.82%	115	4.06%	85	2.98%	120	5.36%	130	5.95%	60	2.46%	25	1.04%
South Asian	55	1.66%	80	2.48%	90	3.05%	85	2.89%	120	4.24%	15	0.53%	105	4.69%	160	7.32%	310	12.73%	330	13.46%
African	30	0.9%	0	0%	10	0.34%	0	0%	0	0%	0	0%	15	0.67%	10	0.46%	—N/a	—N/a	5	0.21%
East Asian (Note: Statistic includes total responses of "Chinese", "Korean", and "Japanese" under visible minority section on census.)	15	0.45%	10	0.31%	15	0.51%	55	1.87%	10	0.35%	50	1.75%	30	1.34%	15	0.69%	65	2.67%	110	4.55%
Latin American	15	0.45%	10	0.31%	0	0%	0	0%	10	0.35%	0	0%	0	0%	0	0%	0	0%	—N/a	—N/a
Southeast Asian (Note: Statistic includes total responses of "Filipino" and "Southeast Asian" under visible minority section on census.)	0	0%	20	0.62%	0	0%	0	0%	10	0.35%	10	0.35%	0	0%	10	0.46%	—N/a	—N/a	—N/a	—N/a
Middle Eastern (Note: Statistic includes total responses of "West Asian" and "Arab" under visible minority section on census.)	0	0%	0	0%	0	0%	0	0%	0	0%	0	0%	10	0.45%	0	0%	0	0%	5	0.21%
Other/multiracial (Note: Statistic includes total responses of "Visible minority, n.i.e." and "Multiple visible minorities" under visible minority section on census.)	0	0%	10	0.31%	0	0%	0	0%	15	0.53%	0	0%	—N/a	—N/a	—N/a	—N/a	—N/a	—N/a	30	1.24%
Total responses	3,315	99.7%	3,220	99.81%	2,955	99.36%	2,940	99.73%	2,830	100.11%	2,855	99.96%	2,240	99.96%	2,185	100.69%	2,435	101.84%	2,415	102.16%
Total population	3,325	100%	3,226	100%	2,974	100%	2,948	100%	2,827	100%	2,856	100%	2,241	100%	2,170	100%	2,391	100%	2,364	100%
Note: Totals greater than 100% due to multiple origin responses.

=== Religion ===
According to the 2021 census, religious groups in Lake Cowichan included:

- Irreligion (2,290 persons or 69.1%)
- Christianity (965 persons or 29.1%)
- Sikhism (25 persons or 0.8%)
- Judaism (10 persons or 0.3%)
- Other (25 persons or 0.8%)

== Politics ==
In provincial politics, Lake Cowichan is part of the riding of Cowichan Valley. Its Member of the Legislative Assembly is Debra Toporowski of the British Columbia New Democratic Party. She has served in the Legislative Assembly of British Columbia since 2024.

In federal politics, Lake Cowichan is part of the riding of Cowichan—Malahat—Langford. Its Member of Parliament is Alistair MacGregor of the federal New Democratic Party. He has served in the House of Commons of Canada since 2015.

== Notable residents ==
See also Category:People from Duncan, British Columbia

- Brad Palmer, former NHL player
- Brian Lundberg, former NHL player
- Steve Lingren, former AHL, ECHL hockey player
- Dan Boeckner, singer, songwriter
- Fritz Perls, co-founder of Gestalt therapy
- William Carpentier, flight surgeon for Apollo 11
