= Cowichan Lake =

Lake in British Columbia, Canada

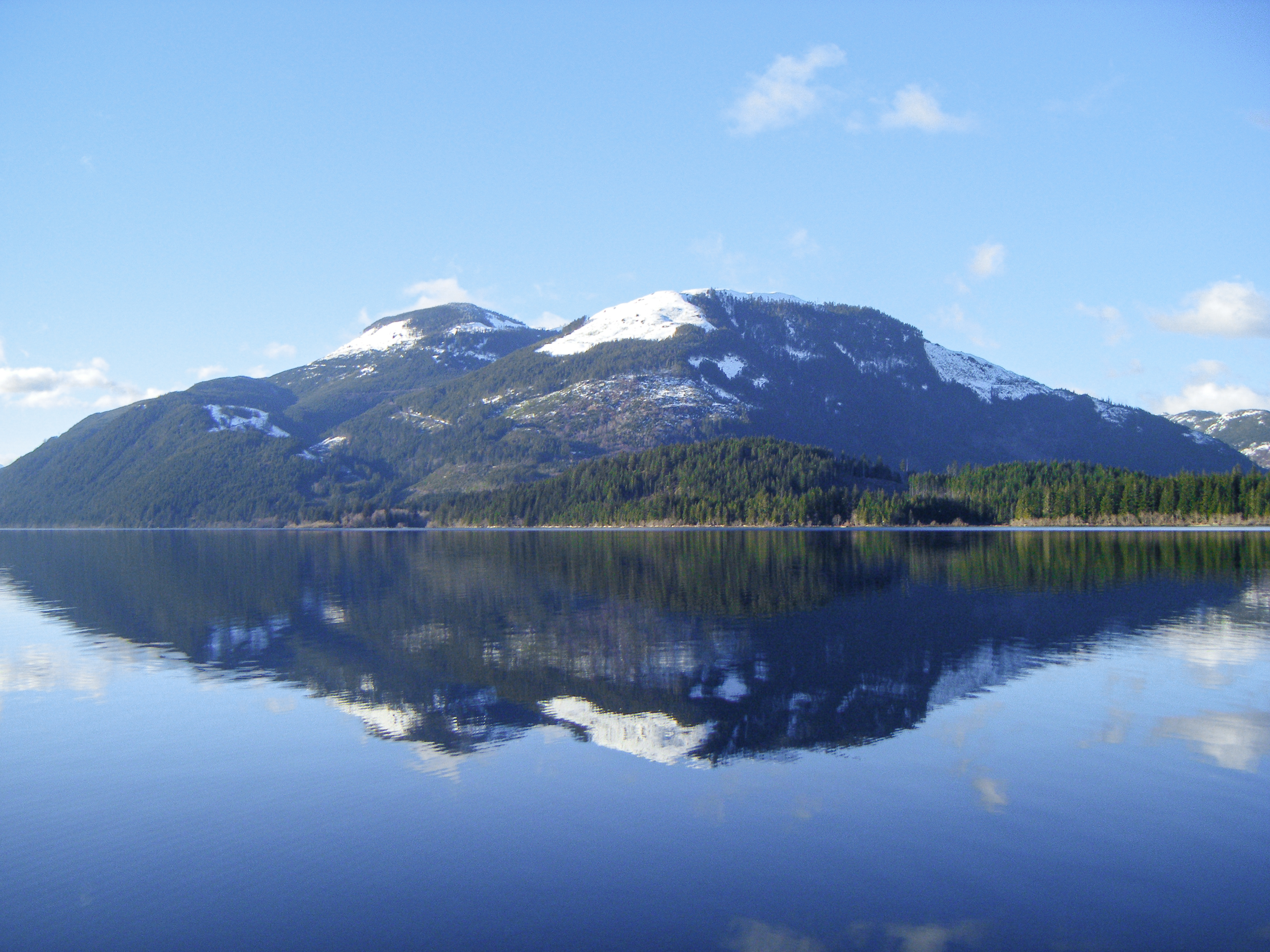

- Location within Vancouver Island
- Location: British Columbia
- Coordinates: 48°49′N 124°02′W
- Primary inflows: Robertson River, Nixon Creek
- Primary outflows: Cowichan River
- Basin countries: Canada
- Max. length: 30 km (19 mi)
- Max. depth: 160 m (520 ft)
- Surface elevation: 164 m (538 ft)
- Settlements: Lake Cowichan

Cowichan Lake is a large freshwater lake located on southern Vancouver Island, British Columbia, Canada. It is located along the Cowichan Valley in the Cowichan Valley Regional District, with its eastern shore about 28 km (17 mi) west of Duncan, British Columbia. Cowichan Lake is about 30 km (19 mi) in length, running mostly from west to east, and is about 4 km (2.5 mi) wide at its widest point. The lake is also the source of the Cowichan River.

Cowichan Lake has several communities along its shores. The town of Lake Cowichan is located at the east end of the lake, at the start of the Cowichan River, and is the largest community. Along the south side of the lake are the communities of Mesachie Lake and Honeymoon Bay, and also Gordon Bay Provincial Park. On the north shore is the community of Youbou.

The Cowichan Valley was once a thriving lumber centre in British Columbia. In the past, two major railroads had spur lines to and around parts of the lake. With the change in the logging industry, these rail lines have now been abandoned by the railroads and are now part of a major public trail system which leads eastward toward the lower end of the Cowichan Valley. The lake area is largely undeveloped because of the extensive logging by timber companies holding the land surrounding the lake. Currently there are several development projects at new locations around the lake.

== See also ==
- List of lakes of British Columbia
