= Honeymoon Bay, British Columbia =

Unincorporated settlement in Canada

Honeymoon Bay is an unincorporated community in the Canadian province of British Columbia. It is located on Cowichan Lake in the southeastern part of Vancouver Island — approximately 75 kilometres (47 mi) northwest of Victoria — at 48°49′N 124°10′W. In 2011, its population was listed at 580.

Historically, its main industry has been forestry.

Many years ago a lonely young bachelor in this area announced he would return to England to find a bride. The community took the name Honeymoon Bay as a result but he never returned.

Honeymoon Bay is one of several towns in the Cowichan Valley with significant South Asian Canadian (primarily Sikh-Canadian) community history for over 130 years, gaining notoriety in the forestry industry at local sawmills from the early 20th century until the 1980s.
