= Cowichan Bay =

Bay in British Columbia, Canada

Coordinates: 48°45′N 123°36′W

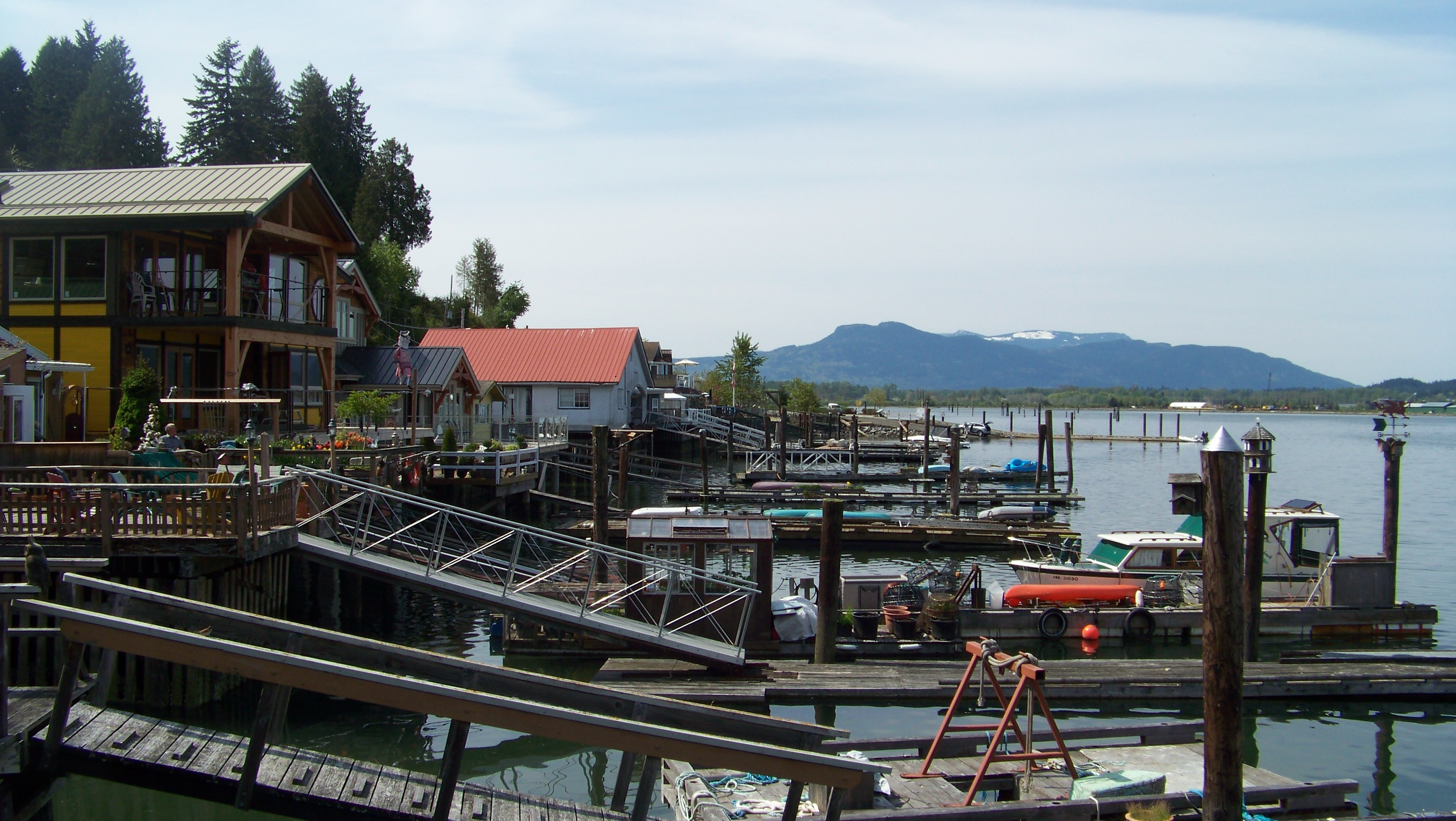
Cowichan Bay

Cowichan Bay (English: /ˈkaʊɪtʃæn/) is a bay and community located on the east coast of southern Vancouver Island near Duncan, in British Columbia, Canada. The mouth of the Cowichan River is near Cowichan Bay. Mount Tzouhalem with its hiking trails and ecological reserve stands to the north. The bay is known for its fishing and scenic value. The area's main industries are fishing and tourism.

The area is served by the nearby coast-spanning Island Highway and Island Rail Corridor.

== First Nation history ==
For many thousands of years Cowichan Bay was home to First Nations people who harvested the wealth of salmon and shellfish found in its many coves, tidal flats and swiftly flowing rivers. A rare steatite anthropomorphic bowl was discovered on Cowichan Bay in the late nineteenth century. One of only about 50 so far found and estimated to originate from the Marpole Culture (400 BC-400 AD), it is now in the British Museum's collection.

== European settlement ==
Cowichan Bay was the gateway for European settlement of the Cowichan and Chemainus valleys from the early 1860s. A steamer service from Victoria was the major link for goods and people before the coming of the railway. Bypassed by the Esquimalt and Nanaimo line and later by the Island Highway, Cowichan Bay nevertheless was a thriving little community, based on sport and commercial salmon fishing, and log and lumber exports.

From the early 1900s Cowichan Bay attracted sportsmen from all over the British Empire for salmon fishing in the Bay and the Cowichan and Koksilah rivers. It was, for a time, the Salmon Capital of the World offering not just fishing, but fine sailing waters, an annual regatta and, next to Wimbledon, the oldest grass tennis courts in the world.

== Tourism ==
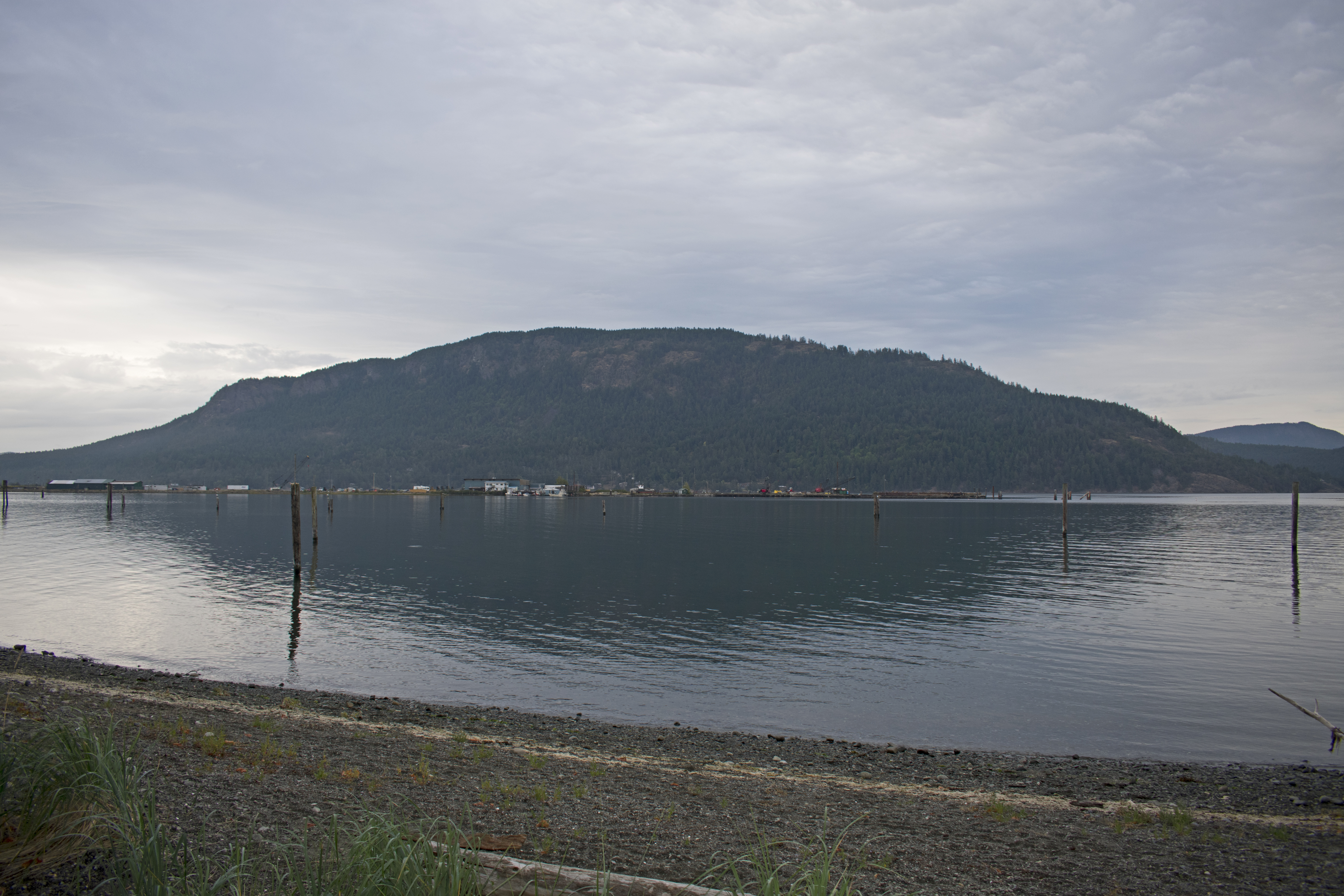
Mount Tzouhalem from Cowichan Bay

The village of Cowichan Bay is a tourist attraction in the summer. The community began a transformation in 2004 when Jonathan Knight opened a European inspired bakery at the centre of the seaside village. His success spawned other businesses to open in the bay; an organic clothing store; a local-made cheese shop; an old-style homemade ice-cream parlour; an upscale restaurant; a pottery shop run by a local artisan; as well as many other eateries and knick-knack shops. Cowichan Bay offers visitors a chance to see their wildlife through kayak tours and rentals and whalewatching tours. Depending on the time of year it is not uncommon to see bald eagles, seals, herons or other wildlife in the area.

=== South Cowichan Lawn Tennis Club ===
South Cowichan Lawn Tennis Club was founded in 1887. It is one of the oldest lawn tennis clubs in the world and the oldest lawn tennis club in Canada.

== Economy ==
A noted deep-water port where tankers and container ships can still be seen at anchor regularly, Cowichan Bay has been plagued by derelicts abandoned at anchor and left to rot — most notably the fuel-filled Dominion, which dragged anchor during a winter storm before being towed away for scrap after a 5-year period, and the replica Beaver, which replaced her, towed in by the same tug that removed the derelict Dominion.

Cowichan Bay's former economic base is declining, but being replaced with more recreational water activities, a revived interest in boatbuilding, an appreciation for the history and ecology of the Bay, and tourism.

== Local politics ==
Cowichan Bay services are provided by the Cowichan Valley Regional District, with fire protection provided by the Cowichan Bay Improvement District which operates Cowichan Bay Fire Rescue. In 2009, Cowichan Bay became Canada and North America's first Cittaslow community.

== Notable residents ==
- James Dunsmuir - Former Premier and Lieutenant-Governor of BC
- Robert William Service - Poet and writer of the Yukon Gold Rush, he worked in several farms of Cowichan Bay from June 1896 to November 1897 and then from October 1898 until October 1, 1903, in the Corfield Farm. A memorial bench has been erected in the Robert Service Wayside Park and a plaque has been embedded up the seat where it can be read few lines of a poem of Robert Service entitled "Heart o' the North" excerpt from "Rhymes of a Rolling Stone".
- Arthur Vickers - Artist, story teller.
