= Cowichan Valley =

Region in British Columbia, Canada

- Valley
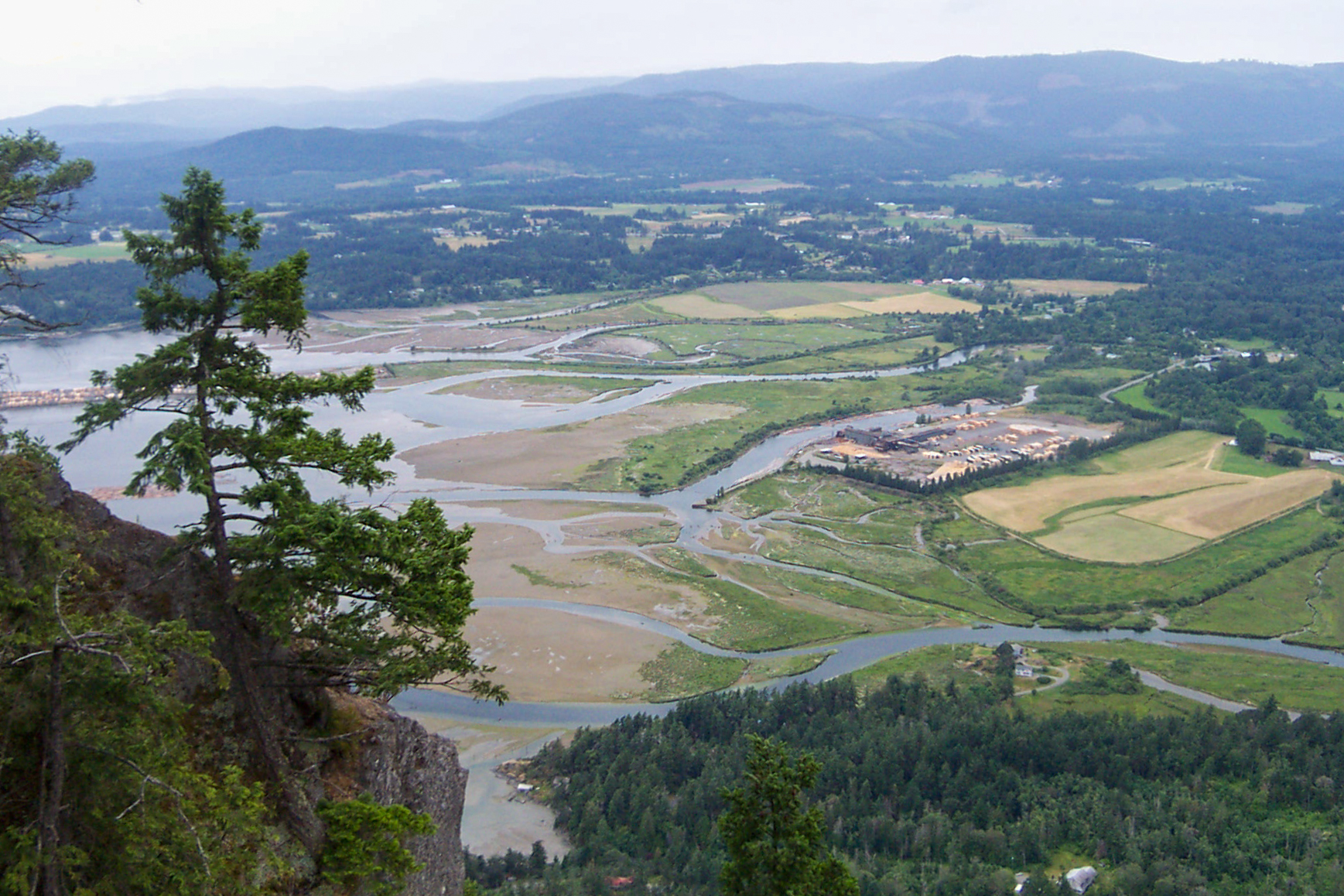
- Cowichan Valley as viewed from Mt Tzouhalem

- Location within British Columbia
- Coordinates: 48°48′40″N 124°01′59″W
- Location: Vancouver Island, British Columbia, Canada

The Cowichan Valley is a region around the Cowichan River, Cowichan Bay and Cowichan Lake on Vancouver Island, in British Columbia, Canada. There is some debate as to the origin of the name Cowichan, which many believe to be an anglicized form of the First Nations tribal name Quw'utsun.

== Communities ==
Communities that lie within the actual Cowichan River/Cowichan Bay watershed include Duncan, Lake Cowichan, Cowichan Bay, Cowichan Station and Maple Bay. Other nearby communities are affiliated mainly through the Cowichan Valley Regional District. Crofton and Chemainus, lie within the Chemainus River Valley, while Cobble Hill, Shawnigan Lake, Mill Bay, and Ladysmith inhabit a coastal plain that includes the Cowichan and Chemainus River deltas.

The Trans Canada Trail goes through the Valley, and there are numerous options for hiking enthusiasts. On January 7, 2010 an air quality monitoring station was installed.

== Agriculture ==
The Cowichan Valley is the home of a growing number of vineyards and wineries. They include Unsworth Vineyards, Cherry Point Vineyards, Blue Grouse, Glenterra, Vigneti Zanatta, Venturi-Schulze, and Averill Creek. The warm, dry summers and mild, moist winters make this area part of Canada's only maritime Mediterranean climate, providing good growing conditions for many grape varietals.

== Demographics ==
In 1891, the population of the subdistricts South Cowichan and North Cowichan were of 921 and 413, respectively.
