= Chemainus (disambiguation) =

Chemainus is an English adaptation of a 19th-century chief's name, stz'uminus, meaning "broken chest". Its primary use is the town of Chemainus, British Columbia. Other uses include:

- the Chemainus River
- Chemainus River Provincial Park
- Chemainus Secondary School
- Chemainus railway station
- the former Chemainus Indian Band now styles itself the Stz'uminus First Nation.
  - Chemainus Indian Reserve No. 13, the main reserve of that government and its community
