= Mining on Vancouver Island =

Mining on Vancouver Island has taken place since the arrival of the Europeans in the 18th century. Vancouver Island, off the coast of British Columbia, Canada, has considerable deposits of minerals, notably coal and copper. In the late 19th century, the abundance of copper led to a large industry, with many entrepreneurs trying to get a large stake. Many communities were established as a result of the need to export the mineral, notably Crofton, which was the site of a smelter set up by Henry Croft. Nearly all the ore that came out of Mt. Sicker, which reached several hundred tons per day at its peak, was carted to the small town, processed, and shipped away.

Eventually, the copper boom ended, and many people abandoned the island. Today, there is still some mining, mainly on the north of the island, but it no longer is a dominant part of the economy as it was in the 19th century.

The Island Copper Mine was a mine on Vancouver Island. It was located near the northern end of Vancouver Island. The mine produced a number of materials, primarily copper, and also gold, silver, molybdenum, and rhenium.
