= School District 79 Cowichan Valley =

School district in British Columbia, Canada

Cowichan Valley School District

Address
- 2557 Beverly Street Duncan, British Columbia, V9L 2X3; Canada

District information
- Grades: K–12
- Established: December 1996; 29 years ago
- Superintendent: Darlene Reynolds (acting)
- School board: Board of Education: Cathy Schmidt; Cindy Lise; David Bellis; Elisha Blackburn; Elizabeth Croft; Randy Doman; Eduardo Sousa
- Schools: 21
- Budget: CA$102,328,344

Students and staff
- Students: 7,605

Other information
- Website: www.sd79.bc.ca

School District 79 Cowichan Valley (SD79) also known as the Cowichan Valley School District is a school district located in the Cowichan Valley on Vancouver Island, British Columbia, Canada. It consists of numerous elementary (Kindergarten–Grade 7), middle (Grades 8–9), secondary (Grades 10–12), and alternative schools for programs like adult education.

The Cowichan Valley School District serves the communities of Duncan, Cowichan Bay, Chemainus, Cobble Hill, Crofton, Shawnigan Lake, Mill Bay, Maple Bay, and Lake Cowichan.

== History ==
The current School District 79 was formed in 1996 when School District 65 (Cowichan) was combined with School District 66 (Lake Cowichan).

A French Immersion program was established in October 1997, for the 1998–1999 school year.

On July 1, 2012, after refusing to send a balanced budget to the Ministry of Education in British Columbia by June 30, the elected Board of Trustees was dismissed. Michael McKay was instated and balanced the budget.

Reconfiguration of the Cowichan Valley School District began in 2013–2014 school year. This marks the change from a middle school model (kindergarten–grade 6, grades 7–9, grades 10–12) to an elementary school system from kindergarten–grade 7 and a secondary school system from grades 8–12.

== Superintendents ==
Name	Tenure	Notes	Ref.
Geoff Johnson	1996–2000	Superintendent of SD65 from 1993 to 1996	
Andy Selder	2000	Acting superintendent	
Brian Hoole	2000–2005		
Peter Porte	2005–2007		
Betty Milne	2007	Acting superintendent	
Dan Boudreau	2008–2011		
Joe Rhodes	2011–2015		
Rod Allen	2015–2019		
Robyn Gray	2019–2024		
Jeff Rowan	2024–2025	Interim superintendent	
Tim Davie	2025–2026	Superintendent of SD70 from 2022 to 2025	
Darlene Reynolds	2026–present	Acting superintendent	

== Schools ==
Elementary, middle, and secondary schools
School	Location	Grades	Principal
Mount Prevost Elementary	Duncan	K–7	Carmen Boudreau
Alex Aitken Elementary	Duncan	K–7	Updesh Cheema
Alexander Elementary	Duncan	K–7	Jennifer Merrett
Bench Elementary	Cowichan Bay	K–7	Mike Martin
Chemainus Community	Chemainus	K–7	Ixchel Bradley
Cobble Hill Elementary	Cobble Hill	K–7	Ian Zibin
Crofton Elementary	Crofton	K–6	Dani Morrow
Discovery Elementary	Shawnigan Lake	K–7	Alison Leslie
Drinkwater Elementary	Duncan	K–7	Delyth Morgan
Khowhemun Elementary	Duncan	K–7	Camila Bhandari-Arscott
George Bonner Elementary	Mill Bay	1–7	Dionte Jelks
Maple Bay Elementary	Maple Bay	K–7	Nicole Davey
Palsson Elementary	Lake Cowichan	K–5	Fiona Somerville
Mill Bay Elementary	Mill Bay	K–3	Brenda Lee
Tansor Elementary	Duncan	K–7	Brent Ranger
Thetis Island Elementary	Chemainus	K–7	Ixchel Bradley
Chemainus Secondary	Chemainus	7–12	Colleen Mullin
Quw'utsun Secondary	Duncan	10–12	Jeff Rowan
Frances Kelsey Secondary	Mill Bay	8–12	Kevin van der Linden
Lake Cowichan	Lake Cowichan	4–12	Claire Whitney
Quamichan	Duncan	8–9	Kelly Girvan

== See also ==
- List of school districts in British Columbia
