= Bill Robinson (basketball) =

Canadian Basketball Player (1949-2020)

Personal information
- Born: 2 February 1949 Chemainus, British Columbia
- Died: 8 February 2020 (aged 71) Duncan, British Columbia
- Listed height: 5 ft 11 in (1.80 m)

Career information
- High school: Chemainus Secondary School (Chemainus, BC)
- College: Simon Fraser University (1970–1974); University of Waterloo (1974-75)
- Position: Guard
- Number: 6, 4

Career highlights
- Captain of 1976 Canada men's national basketball team; 1974 FIBA World Championship All-tournament selection; NAIA All-American honorable mention (1974); CIAU First Team All-Canadian (1975); CIAU Tournament All-star (1975); CIAU champion (1975); OUA West First Team All-star (1975); OUA Tournament MVP (1975); OUA champion (1975)

William Edward Robinson (born 2 February 1949) is regarded as one of the best Canadian basketball players in history. Among his accomplishments, he was captain of the Canadian national team in the 1976 Olympics, an All-tournament selection in the 1974 FIBA World Championship, and a CIAU First Team All-Canadian in 1975.

== International career ==
Robinson played for the Canadian national team from 1970-77 Notably, Robinson was captain of the 1976 Olympic team which competed for the bronze medal and finished fourth overall. This was one of the two times in the past 90 years in which Canada competed for an Olympic medal in basketball, the other being the 1984 Olympics. Robinson performed well in this bronze-medal game, leading all scorers with 24 points, which constituted a third of Canada's 72 points. Robinson performed well overall in the tournament, being Canada's second overall leading scorer with 16.7 ppg.

Robinson also represented Canada in the 1974 FIBA World Championship, where he was selected to the All-Tournament team. Robinson also participated in the 1970 FIBA World Championship, where he was Canada's fourth-leading scorer.

== University ==
Before university, Robinson played at the high school level at Chemainus Secondary School, where he was named the Island high school tournament MVP as he led his team to finals against Oak Bay High School.

Robinson then played four seasons (1970–74) at Simon Fraser University, where he averaged 14.3 ppg, amassed 1,504 career points and received a NAIA All-American honorable mention his senior year.

Robinson played a fifth year at the University of Waterloo for the 1974-75 season, where he was named a First Team All-Canadian. He was also named a CIAU Tournament All-star. In conference play, he was named a OUA West First Team All-star and the OUA tournament MVP.

While at Waterloo, Robinson performed well in other tournaments. He was named the MVP at the 1970 Naismith Classic (a tournament hosted by the University of Waterloo), the 1974 WLU tournament and the 1974 Carleton tournament.

The Waterloo Warriors performed well under Robinson's leadership. In 1974-75, the Warriors won the CIAU national championship, the only time in program history. This season they were also the OUA Conference champions.

== Professional career ==
In 1971, Robinson was the final cut for the ABA's Virginia Squires. Robinson relayed to the media that the Squires organization told him that the reason for the cut was because he was Canadian and they wanted to select a more recognizable NCAA player would who attract for ticket sales.

Robinson played professionally in Spain, Italy, Belgium and Mexico, after which he played in Canada's Senior Men's League for the Victoria Scorpions and in Nanaimo, British Columbia.

== Post-career recognition ==
Robinson has been inducted into the Canada Basketball Hall of Fame (2002), the BC Basketball Hall of Fame (2005), the Simon Frasier University Athletics Hall of Fame (1986), and the city of North Cowichan/Duncan Sports Wall of Fame (2009). The 1976 Canadian national men's team, of which Robinson was part, was also inducted into the Canada Basketball Hall of Fame (2007).

== Personal life / death ==
Robinson was born on 2 February 1949 in Chemainus, BC. He died on 8 February 2020 shortly after his 71 birthday after suffering a stroke . At the time of his passing, he was survived by his wife Sandi, his son David, his daughters Ella and Leah and five grandchildren.
