= Mount Sicker =

Mountain in the country of Canada

- Location within British Columbia
- Location near North Cowichan

Highest point
- Elevation: 716 m (2,349 ft)
- Listing: Mountains of British Columbia
- Coordinates: 48°51′37″N 123°45′25″W

Geography
- Location: British Columbia, Canada
- District: Somenos Land District
- Topo map: NTS 92B13 Duncan

Mount Sicker is in southern Vancouver Island, British Columbia. The twin summits of Big Sicker Mountain, at 716 metres (2,349 ft), and Little Sicker Mountain, at 660 metres (2,170 ft), are near Crofton, Chemainus and Duncan.

The name honours John J. Sicker, a homesteader in the area.

== Mining discovery ==
In fall 1895, prospectors Thomas L. Sullins, T. McKay and Henry Buzzard discovered traces of copper, gold and silver on Mt. Sicker and staked their claims. McKay died that winter. In spring 1896, Harry Smith became the new partner, but their copper claims proved unpromising. That August, when a forest fire devastated the western face of the mountain, they abandoned the shaft being dug and fled. The fire destroyed their cabin and gear. When Smith returned alone in spring 1897, the burned area revealed a 9.1-metre (30 ft) wide outcropping of copper at the mountain's 430-metre (1,400 ft) level. Within weeks of the discovery becoming public, prospectors had staked the entire mountain.

== Lenora ==
=== Mining ===
Harry Smith named the new strike Lenora, after his married daughter. In 1904, Lenora Richards (also part owner of Richard III), and Thomas Sullins' wife and children, drowned in the S.S. Clallam sinking. Thomas survived.

In fall 1897, Harry Smith established the Lenora, Mt. Sicker and BC Development Co. To provide investment capital, Henry Croft, brother-in-law of James Dunsmuir, bought a majority shareholding in spring 1898. Reorganized as Lenora, Mt. Sicker Copper Mining Co., Croft became the manager. By January 1900, the Lenora mine was the fourth largest shipper of ore in BC. Mining ceased in late 1902 when the company went into receivership. During 1905, small scale operations resumed until the mine closure the following year. In 1907, the mine was reactivated by the Vancouver Copper Co, which went bankrupt that year.

=== Townsite ===
A townsite was laid out northwest of the mining tunnel, and by 1899, contained a general store, school, stable and home sites. In 1900, lots in the townsite development were sold. In early 1901, the 18-room Mt. Sicker Hotel and 40-pupil schoolhouse opened. In 1907, the hotel closed, and the contents sold by sheriff's sale over the following two years. In due course, the townsite buildings were offered for sale at $8 for the hotel and $2 for the cottages.

=== Roads & transportation ===
In 1900, a daily Lenora–Westholme stage commenced. A wagon road, horse tramway, and then a narrow-gauge railway provided the initial link with the company siding on the Esquimalt and Nanaimo Railway (E&N), immediately southwest of the Westholme station. The ore travelled by rail to Ladysmith, and by boat to the smelter at Vananda (now Van Anda) on Texada Island. By 1901, the ore went to the Tacoma smelter. In 1902, the company extended its railway line to Crofton for processing ore at its new smelter. (see Lenora Mt. Sicker Railway).

== Tyee ==
=== Mining ===
In spring 1897, Smith and Buzzard, also staked the Tyee claim, several hundred feet higher than Lenora. The most promising of several claims, the Tyee Development Co. was established, but acquired by the Tyee Copper Co in April 1900. Production peaked in 1905, being the largest copper producer on the BC coast. By 1907, production had fallen dramatically, and the mine closed.

=== Townsite ===
By 1901, the Tyee had its own townsite, and Brenton Hotel by the fall. The total Mt. Sicker population was reaching 2,000, making it the fourth largest on Vancouver Island.

=== Roads & transportation ===
In October 1900, a 2.4-metre (8 ft) wide wagon road opened from Somenos. From the E&N station, the ore went to Ladysmith, then Tacoma. In October 1902, the company opened a 5.3 kilometres (3.3 mi) aerial tramway to carry half-ton buckets of ore from the mine to a 200-ton capacity ore bin at its E&N siding about 3.2 kilometres (2 mi) south of the Lenora mine one.

Comprising the longest single section in the world, the tramway dropped 580 metres (1,900 ft), and had a 5,000-ton-monthly capacity. In 1902, the company opened its own smelter west of Ladysmith, with the concentrate going to Tacoma for final processing.

== Richard III ==
Higher and to the east of the Tyee, the Richard III mine conducted development work in late 1902, and in 1903. The Tyee aerial tramway, and then E&N, transported ore to Ladysmith. In 1905, the mined closed temporarily because the original ore seam appeared exhausted. Production peaked in 1906. Final closure was in 1907. This mine and the Tyee experienced flooding problems, which had required installing expensive drainage pipes and pumps.

== Mt. Sicker & Brenton ==
This company had a separate townsite to the west called Copper Canyon Camp, which never came to prominence.

== Later mining ==
Revivals of mining operations proved uneconomical and short-lived. In 1924, Lenora reopened under lease. In 1926, Ladysmith Tidewater Smelters took over the assets of Tyee mine and smelter and leased the Lenora. In 1928, the ventures changed hands again. In 1929, all work ceased and the lease dropped. In 1939, Lenora, Tyee, and Richard III, were optioned for development work, but dropped in 1940. In 1941, the Department of Mines conducted a comprehensive examination of mountain's geology. By 1943, Twin J Mines had rehabilitated all three, operating intermittently until 1952. Lifetime recoveries have totalled 20,265,763 pounds of copper, 841,276 ounces of silver, and 39,052 ounces of gold, the latter decades making only a small contribution.

== Remnants ==
Many houses were salvaged and moved to other communities in the Cowichan Valley, but some remained as a ghost town until weather, vandalism, and finally logging erased visible traces.

== Access ==
Mount Sicker can be reached from Mount Prevost Rd off Somenos Rd, or from Mt. Sicker Rd off Westholme Rd. The roads on Mt. Sicker are unpaved, unmaintained, not sign-posted, and designated for active logging. The mountain offers good views of the Gulf Islands and Chemainus River valley.

== Towers ==
Opened in 2000, the weather radar installation on the south face covered a 256 kilometres (159 mi) radius. Access to the property is gated, under video surveillance, and fenced. A communication tower and cell tower also occupy the site. After a 2017 hardware failure, the location became a decommissioned site of the Canadian weather radar network the next year.
