= Sicker =

Sicker may refer to:

- Arne Sicker, German professional footballer
- Mount Sicker, southern Vancouver Island, British Columbia, Canada
- A track from Babylon (Skindred album)
