= Copper Canyon (disambiguation) =

Copper Canyon is a canyon system in the state of Chihuahua, Mexico

Copper Canyon may also refer to:

- The Copper Canyon Railway through the Copper Canyon in Mexico
- Copper Canyon, Texas, a town in Denton County, Texas
- Copper Canyon, a small canyon on the lower Chemainus River on Vancouver Island, British Columbia, Canada
- A canyon in Death Valley National Park
- A canyon in Lake Havasu
- Copper Canyon Press, a small publishing house in Port Townsend, Washington
- Copper canyon (R&D), the first part of the DARPA NASP program
- Copper Canyon (film), a 1950 Western movie starring Ray Milland
- "Copper Canyon", charting single by Teresa Brewer
