= Frances Kelsey Secondary School =

Location
- 953 Shawnigan-Mill Bay Road; Mill Bay, British Columbia; Canada; 48.6603°N 123.5697°W

Information
- School type: High School
- Founded: 1995–1996
- School board: SD79
- School number: 07965039
- Principal: Kevin van der Linden
- Co-Vice Principal: Steven Brooks
- Co-Vice Principal: Penny Butler
- Grades: 8–12
- Enrollment: 970 (2024)
- Language: English
- Colours: White, Navy, Gold
- Mascot: Orca
- Team name: Breakers/Whalers
- Website: www.fkss.sd79.bc.ca

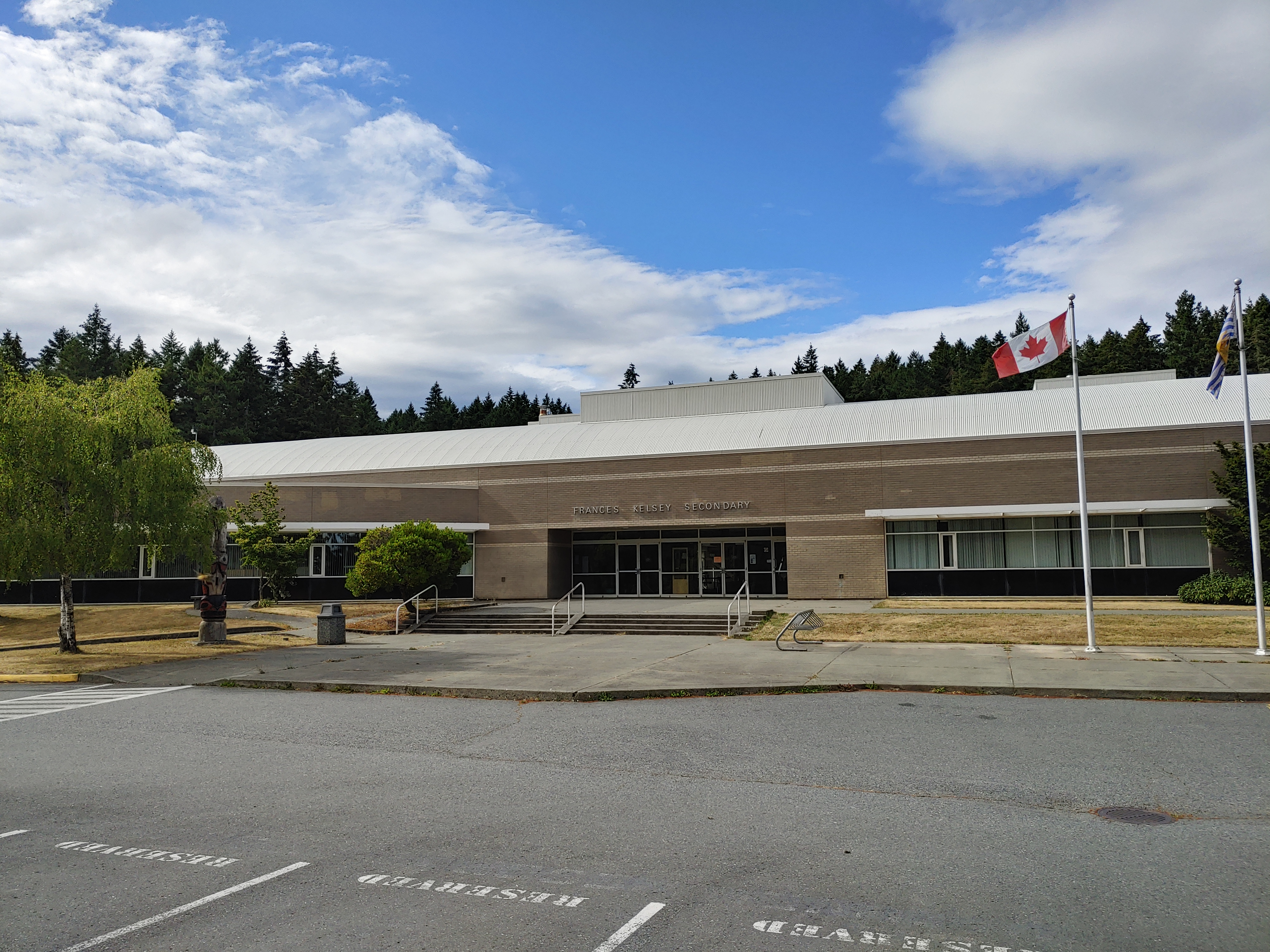
FKSS, School District 79, Mill Bay, BC, Canada

Frances Kelsey Secondary School (FKSS) is a high school located in Mill Bay, British Columbia, Canada, named after Dr. Frances Oldham Kelsey. The school, under founding Principal Allan MacLeod, originally adopted a self-directed learning system which is no longer the model followed. FKSS is one of School District 79 Cowichan Valley's four mainstream secondary schools.

== History ==
Rapid population growth of Duncan and the Mill Bay area in the late 1980s led to overcrowding of Cowichan Secondary School in Duncan. and a decision to build a second high school. A site for the new high school was purchased in the south of the school district, in Mill Bay, by 1991, and construction started in 1994. The school opened in February 1995, and was named for Frances Oldham Kelsey, a local who prevented the approval of thalidomide in the United States while working for the Food and Drug Administration. The school was expanded in 2004. The history of the school and its namesake can be found in vignettes which were put up on the walls in 2024.

== Changes to the school structure ==
On May 15, 2013 the Cowichan Valley School District made the decision to eliminate middle schools in the District in an effort to save on budgeting costs. The decision was also prompted by the decline in school population over the past years. Starting September 2013, Grade 8 students joined the school.

== Academics ==
=== Science ===
Science 9 and Science 10 are mandatory courses in the BC curriculum. Students must also take one science at the Grade 11 or 12 level. In Grade 11 these are Biology 11, Physics 11, Environmental Science 11, and Chemistry 11. Grade 12 courses are Biology 12, Chemistry 12, Physics 12 and Environmental Science 12.

=== Mathematics ===
Completed in 2005, Frances Kelsey's Math wing holds five classrooms specializing in the study of Mathematics. Students focus on the ministry program, but often the program allows students to deviate depending on their ability. Three levels of each math grade are offered, as well as Calculus in Grade 12.

=== English ===
The Frances Kelsey English program prides itself on promoting diversity and including Indigenous content while improving overall literacy skills.

=== Social Studies ===
Social Studies offers a wide range of courses to choose within the program. Geography 12 is taught through an Outdoor Ed program which also includes PHE credit and has students trail building and engaging with nature on the local mountain. Other options at the senior level are Law 12, Genocide Studies 12, First Peoples 12 and History 12.

=== Languages ===
Kelsey offers French and Spanish. Grade 12 languages are only offered if there is sufficient enrolment in the course. Kelsey also has an exchange program with many students from Japan, China, Germany and other countries coming to FKSS to learn English and graduate under the BC education program.

== Technology ==
=== Computer Sciences & Technology ===
One of Kelsey's many computer labs is dedicated to Computer Programming and there is an adjoining room for Robotics.

== Arts ==
=== Theatre ===
Frances Kelsey's Theatre program is tied closely with the dramatic and vocal arts. Drama is offered as an exploratory course for grade 9's and 10's. At the Grade 11/12 level it is offered in full year courses such as Acting, Directing and Script Development, Stagecraft, and Theatre Management. The theatre "company" hosts a fluctuating number of plays directed by the current teacher and sometimes by students. Most of the theatre maintenance and props are completed by students enrolled in Stagecraft courses.

=== Band ===
Frances Kelsey Secondary offers an easy band program for all levels. Jazz Band, Choir, and Concert Band are all offered. Students in the program take part in numerous performances throughout the year and compete in festivals at the local level.

=== Visual Arts ===
The schools art program occupies one of the largest rooms in the school, hosting students in both two-dimensional and three-dimensional art programs. Art students can choose to do Drawing, Painting, Sculpting, and Carving. Art Careers is offered to senior students who wish to pursue art in their future.

=== Culinary Arts ===
Kelsey students run the Kelsey Cafe and serve lunch to the student body learning the skills of working in an industrial kitchen.
