= Westholme, British Columbia =

Coordinates: 48°52′N 123°42′W

Westholme is a community located in the Chemainus River Valley alongside the Island Highway, between Chemainus and Duncan in British Columbia, Canada. It is part of the Chemainus Land District in the District Municipality of North Cowichan. Westholme is one of the original settlements on Vancouver Island. Once a thriving mining and farming community, it is now filled with hobby farms and upscale private estates on large acreages, many of which are owned to this day by the descendants of original settlers to this area.

Westholme is divided by the Island Highway. It is bordered by the Somenos Land District to the south, Mount Sicker to the west, the Chemainus River to the north, the Halalt First Nation Reserve to the northeast, and Crofton to the east. It is a peaceful private community nestled in the shadow of Mount Sicker which is on the western edge of this community.

The ending to the movie Five Easy Pieces starring Jack Nicholson was filmed in Westholme.

The area is served by the coast-spanning Island Highway and the Island Rail Corridor.
