= List of narrow-gauge railways in British Columbia =

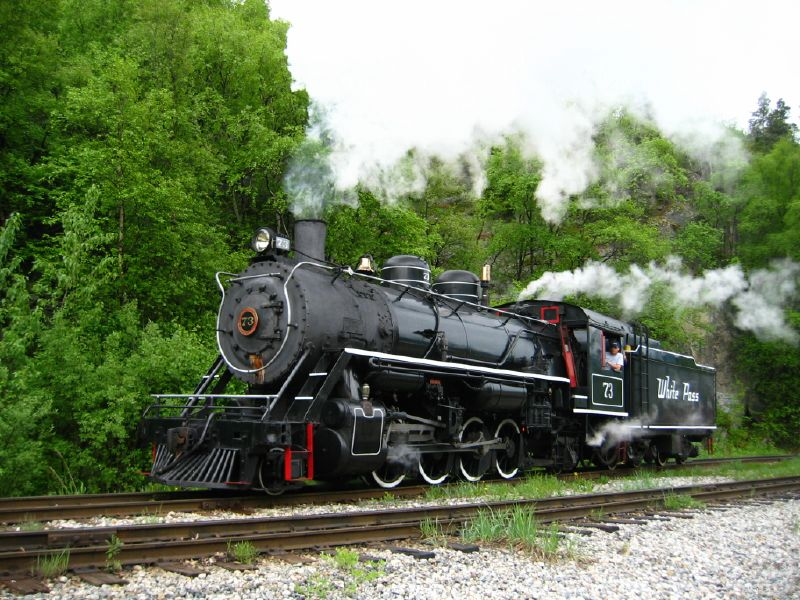
Steam Locomotive #73 of the White Pass and Yukon Route

== List of railways ==
- Anyox Mines Railway
- Blakeburn Mines Railway
- Britannia Beach Mine Railway
- BC Cement (Texada Island)
- Coquitlam Lake Railway
- Lang Bay Timber
- Cornell Tramway
- Columbia and Western Railway
- Craigmont mines
- Dolly Varden Mines
- Kaslo and Slocan Railway
- Hernando Island logging
- Nanaimo Tramway
- White Pass and Yukon Route
- Leonora and Mt. Sicker Railway
- Dozier's Way (Seton Lake Tramway)
- BCER Stave Falls Branch
- Sullivan Mine
- Sooke Dam Railway
- Western Peat Tramway
