= Chemainus Secondary School =

High school in British Columbia, Canada

Chemainus Secondary

Location
- 9947 Daniel St; Chemainus, British Columbia, V0R 1K0; Canada; 48.92850°N 123.72504°W

Information
- School type: Public, high school
- Motto: We Lead
- Founded: 1953
- School board: School District 79 Cowichan Valley
- School number: 7965033
- Principal: Colleen Mullin
- Vice Principal: Ashley Bell
- Staff: 42
- Grades: 8-12
- Enrollment: 384 (September 30, 2019)
- Language: English
- Area: Chemainus, Crofton, Saltair
- Colours: Red, White, Blue
- Mascot: Cougar
- Team name: Cougars

Chemainus Secondary is a public high school in Chemainus, British Columbia part of School District 79 Cowichan Valley. It was founded in 1953 and serves students from the area around Chemainus, Crofton, Thetis Island and southern Saltair, British Columbia.

There are 413 students enrolled for the 2023-24 academic session,

From 2003 until 2005 the school went through a major renovation, updating many facilities. The library has been twice received Times Colonist Raise a Reader Grants. The first in 2008–9, for $1,400, was directed to Science reading materials. In 2009–10, the school received $1,200 for audio books and the companion novels.
