= Track gauge in Canada =

Track gauge in Canada is standard gauge of 4 ft 8 1/2 in (1,435 mm), except for Toronto transit systems and the White Pass and Yukon Route. Rail lines built during the 19th century with a broad gauge of 5 ft 6 in (1,676 mm) were converted to standard gauge.

== History ==
The first railway in British North America, the Champlain and St. Lawrence Railroad, was built in the mid-1830s to 4 ft 8 1/2 in (1,435 mm) track gauge. This was followed by the Albion Colliery tramway in 4 ft 8 1/2 in (1,435 mm) and the Montreal and Lachine Railroad in 4 ft 9 in (1,448 mm). However, the promoters of St. Lawrence and Atlantic Railroad, (intended to connect Montreal to the ice-free port at Portland, Maine) decided to use 5 ft 6 in (1,676 mm), setting a precedent for the colony for several decades. The first section from Longueuil to St. Hyacinthe opened in 1847 and at the end of that year there were 30 miles (48 km) of broad gauge and 22 miles (35 km) of standard gauge in Canada.

Following a Royal Commission, in 1851 the 5 ft 6 in (1,676 mm) broad gauge was adopted by the Province of Canada (present day Ontario and Quebec) as the standard gauge and government subsidies were unavailable for railways that chose other gauges. (Note: 5 ft 6 in (1,676 mm) was called 'Provincial gauge' in Canada and today is generally known as "Indian gauge" after it was adopted as the first standard in India in 1851 and remains the dominant gauge there.) Well-known colonial systems such as the Grand Trunk Railway and Great Western Railway, along with the Intercolonial Railway, European and North American Railway and Nova Scotia Railway later expanded the use of broad gauge. By 1860 there were 1,706 miles (2,746 km) of broad gauge and 176 miles (283 km) of standard gauge.

=== Conversion to 1,435 mm (4 ft 8 1/2 in) gauge ===
Track gauge in the United States is standard gauge. In 1867 the Great Western Railway converted to dual gauge the 229 miles (369 km) line from Windsor to Suspension Bridge, where it connected to the US network, allowing an end to transshipment at the previous break-of-gauge. The railroad even ran mixed gauge trains on the line. In 1864 the Grand Trunk Railway had taken control of the standard gauge Montreal and Champlain Railroad which had two lines to the US border; while they installed some short sections of dual gauge track they did not convert the main lines. The GTR trialled 500 wagons with variable gauge wheel-sets but these proved unreliable and were considered potentially dangerous. In 1870 the new Parliament of Canada repealed the act mandating 5 ft 6 in (1,676 mm), after which time there was a change to standard gauge over several years. However, each railway had to change lines quickly, coordinating locomotive and track replacement with rolling stock replacements or upgrades.

The rise in standardization with the US came about because of increasing trade across the border after the American Civil War, a process that was also underway within the US which had a greater diversity of gauges. The notion that rolling stock could earn money while on other railroads had become attractive, adding to the spur for standardization. The Grand Trunk system started converting its border lines in 1872 and finished converting its lines east of Montreal in 1874. The Canadian government-owned Intercolonial Railway converted from broad to standard gauge in 1875 while still under construction. By the end of 1881 there were only 60 miles (97 km) of broad gauge left belonging to two lines that closed in 1898 and 1910 respectively.

After the 1870s, the Canadian Pacific Railway (1880) and most major new lines were built to the standard gauge, including all the railways built through the Canadian Rocky Mountains to the Pacific coast. In addition to the CPR these included the Grand Trunk Pacific Railway, the Canadian Northern Railway and the Pacific Great Eastern Railway. The latter three were eventually acquired by Canadian National Railway, which is now the largest railway in Canada.

All remaining Canadian freight railways use standard gauge. In 1963 Canadian Rail called broad gauge a "blight" caused by "selfish commercial interests". The journal said that without broad gauge the Great Western Railway and Grand Trunk Railway would have avoided many problems, and speculated that the Grand Trunk Railway might have survived as an independent system.

== Toronto gauge ==
The Toronto subway (heavy-rail lines only) and streetcar system use Toronto gauge of 4 ft 10 7/8 in (1,495 mm). However, standard gauge is used on light metro lines (existing and proposed) and light-rail lines (under construction), all of which are considered part of the Toronto subway system. This previously created a break of gauge at Kennedy station, where all passengers had to disembark from the Toronto-gauge subway trains to board the standard-gauge Scarborough RT on another platform. In September 2023 the Scarborough RT was permanently closed, and the Line 2 extension will serve as a replacement for the RT, which will permanently remove the break of gauge.

== Narrow gauge ==
The White Pass and Yukon Route is an isolated narrow gauge railway that connects Skagway, Alaska with the northwestern tip of British Columbia and Carcross, Yukon. It uses three foot gauge.

The former Newfoundland Railway "Newfie Bullet" Caribou (train) used three feet, six inches as its narrow gauge; these tracks have been dismantled and the right-of-way used as a T'Railway.

== See also ==
- Narrow gauge railways in Canada
- Track gauge in North America
