= Quw'utsun Secondary School =

Quw’utsun Secondary School

Location
- 2003 University Way; North Cowichan, British Columbia, V9L 0G9; Canada; 48.7846°N 123.7040°W

Information
- Former name: Cowichan Secondary School
- School type: Public, Secondary School
- Founded: 1950 (as Cowichan Secondary); 2025 (as Quw'utsun Secondary)
- School board: School District 79 Cowichan Valley
- Educational authority: British Columbia Ministry of Education and Child Care
- Principal: Jeff Rowan
- Vice Principals: Kelly Girvan; Lindy Thompson
- Grades: 10–12
- Enrollment: over 1000
- Capacity: 1100
- Schedule: M–F: 8:55 am–3:15 pm
- Campus size: 5.30 ha
- Colour
- Mascot: Thunderbird
- Team name: Thunderbirds
- Portable Classrooms on-site: 10
- Website: qss.sd79.bc.ca

Quw’utsun Secondary School, formerly known as Cowichan Secondary School, is a public secondary school near Duncan, British Columbia. It’s the main secondary school for School District 79 Cowichan Valley and is one of the largest on Vancouver Island. In 2013, the school became a dual-campus Grade 8–12 school after Quamichan Middle School on Beverley Street was merged with Cowichan Secondary on James Street. In September 2018, the dual-campus model was dissolved and Cowichan Secondary School and Quamichan School returned to being two separate schools, leaving Cowichan Secondary as a grades 10-12 secondary school. On February 3, 2025, the new school, named Quw'utsun Secondary, was officially opened. On April 4, 2025, the Cowichan Valley School District announced that the old Cowichan Secondary building would be used for RCMP and Sheriff Service training.

== Location ==
The school was under construction in the 1940s near the Trans-Canada Highway.

Planning in 2014 considered relocating the school to the property purchased for the school's new build, adjacent to Vancouver Island University's Duncan campus and the Cowichan Community Centre recreation facility.

In 2019, the Cowichan Secondary School Replacement Project was formally announced. In early January 2021, Urban One Builders and hcma architecture + design were selected to head design and construction. The school will prioritize seismic safety and is three stories tall. The architectural features of the school is in honour the unceded Quw’utsun lands where it situates. The new building is approximately 11,975 square metres and built for 1100 students, with the ability to expand to house 1500 students with the addition of new classrooms. The construction of the school costed $86.7m, from the original $82.2m budget, and opened February 3, 2025.

== Arts ==
In 2012, Cowichan became the first school in the province of British Columbia to be invited to perform at the International Fringe Festival, the prestigious theatre festival in Edinburgh, Scotland

== Sports ==
Cowichan has multiple competitive sports teams. These sports include senior and junior girls field hockey, girls rugby, boys rugby, and girls and boys basketball. The most high-achieving team is the girls field hockey team who frequently win provincial championship games. Most of the Senior sports are at the 3A level, except for the volleyball program, which the school is in the process of rebuilding. For the last 4 years, there has been a Junior (Grade 10) team and a Senior girls 4A team.
