= Leonora and Mt. Sicker Railway =

Narrow-gauge railway in Crofton, British Columbia, Canada

The Lenora Mt. Sicker Railway was a narrow-gauge railway which hauled copper ore from the Lenora mine on Mount Sicker to tidewater at Crofton on southern Vancouver Island, British Columbia.

== Wagon road ==
In spring 1897, Harry Smith noticed a copper outcrop on a section of Mt. Sicker, devastated by a forest fire the previous summer. He staked a claim named Lenora. In the fall, the operation was organized as the Mt. Sicker and BC Development Co., which built a wagon road from the Westholme station on the Esquimalt and Nanaimo Railway (E&N). The next year, Henry Croft, brother-in-law of James Dunsmuir, bought the mine, which he reorganized as the Lenora, Mt. Sicker Copper Mining Co. By January 1900, the Lenora mine was the fourth largest ore producer in BC, but the wagon teams could not keep pace with the mine output.

== Horse tramway ==
The company built a 5-kilometre (3 mi) narrow gauge line from the Lenora mine dump, down the mountain, across the wagon road, and terminating at a company siding on the E&N, immediately southwest of Westholme. Becoming operational in March 1890, the horse-drawn railway wagons frequently derailed because of inferior track construction. Using both modes, 200 tons per week were brought down to the siding. Introducing stronger horses, haulage increased to 50 tons per day, still far short of 150 tons per day the mine produced.

== Locomotive traction ==
A replacement 10-kilometre (6 mi) route surveyed, grading began in August 1900. That December, the first Shay was acquired and rails laid. The grade was 13 per cent on the steepest section of the 3 ft (914 mm) gauge track. Shay No. 1 could handle a single loaded 10-ton ore car, or two 5-ton ones. The inaugural run in January 1901, the line was soon averaging 70 tons daily.

That July, a more powerful Shay (No. 2) was purchased. In August, the first trip handled two 10-ton cars. The next month, two small passenger cars joined the small fleet. This service connected with the E&N northbound in the morning, and the southbound in the afternoon.

After No. 2 arrived, No. 1 was used only as a spare, or for track maintenance duties, or briefly in August 1902, when No. 2 was under repair.

== Crofton extension ==
In 1902, the company extended the line to Crofton via a trestle over the E&N Mt. Sicker siding. The 8.5-kilometre (5.3 mi) route included three switchbacks. This line, and the new Crofton smelter, made it economical to transport lower grade ore. Unlike the previous two used models, the company bought a new Shay (No. 3) to complete the tracklaying, and join No. 2 in operating over the 20.1 kilometres (12.5 mi) of track. Being more powerful, No. 3 worked the heavier grades up to the mine, and No. 2 worked the extension to Crofton.

== Closure ==
Operations ceased in late 1902 when the company went into receivership. While operating down the overgrown, unmaintained track in 1904, No. 3 lost control, derailed, and ruptured the steam dome. The wreck remained abandoned until 1912. During 1905, small scale operations resumed until the mine closure the following year.

In 1907, the line was temporarily rehabilitated to move 1,700 tons of ore extracted during a reactivation of the line by the Vancouver Copper Co, which went bankrupt that year. Shay No. 2 hauled the product to Crofton.

== Names ==
Initially, the "Mount Sicker Railway", or slight name variations, were used. From 1902, Croft called the enterprise the "Lenora Mount Sicker Railway", but this was not popularly adopted. In 1907, the locomotives were lettered V.C.C. for the Vancouver Copper Co.

== Abandonment & Shay disposals ==
In 1908, the Surrey Shingle Company (a.k.a. H.M. Ellis Lumber Co) bought No. 1, which was scrapped in 1918. The Westholme Lumber Co. rented No. 2. 1908–1912. In 1912, when the V.C.C. bankruptcy proceedings finalized, a horse-drawn flatcar was assigned for track lifting operations. However, a section in use by Westholme Lumber was left untouched. That year, Westholme bought and repaired No. 3, and Campbell River Lumber Co. bought No. 2, which ran first at Campbell River, and then on Hernando Island until 1920, when wrecked and scrapped. In 1918, Eastern Lumber, south of Ladysmith, bought No. 3. In a 1919 derailment, the engineer was fatally scalded, as had happened the prior year before the purchase. After abandonment in a creek, No. 3 was scrapped in 1923.
