= Chemainus River =

River in British Columbia, Canada

Coordinates: 48°43′N 123°41′W

The Chemainus River is located on southern Vancouver Island, British Columbia, Canada. Its source is on the east flank of El Capitan Mountain in the Vancouver Island Ranges, and it flows eastwards to the Strait of Georgia near the North Cowichan community of Chemainus, British Columbia. The valley that surrounds the river additionally includes the communities of Crofton and Westholme as well as the Halalt First Nation Reserve and several smaller reserves. Located on one of the largest islands at the mouth of the river, an old now-deserted village called Xulel-thw stands on the northeast corner; Coast Salish peoples lived there and in other now-deserted villages in the area, constantly moving throughout history.[source?]

== See also ==
- List of rivers of British Columbia
- Stz'uminus First Nation (Chemainus Indian Band)
- Chemainus River Provincial Park
