= Saltair, British Columbia =

Coordinates: 48.945°N 123.759°W

Saltair is an unincorporated community with a population of 2,325 on the east coast of Vancouver Island, British Columbia, Canada, or the Georgia Strait. It is a predominantly rural community located between the urban centers of Ladysmith and Chemainus. Saltair is within the Cowichan Valley Regional District. It is home to a number of parks: Stocking Creek Park, Diana, Princess of Wales Wilderness Park, and Saltair Centennial Park. In part, Saltair is a community of artists, scenery and farmland. It provides panoramic ocean and mountain views and a rural ambiance its residents treasure. Community news and updates can be found on Saltair websites. The area is served by the coast-spanning Island Highway and the Island Rail Corridor.

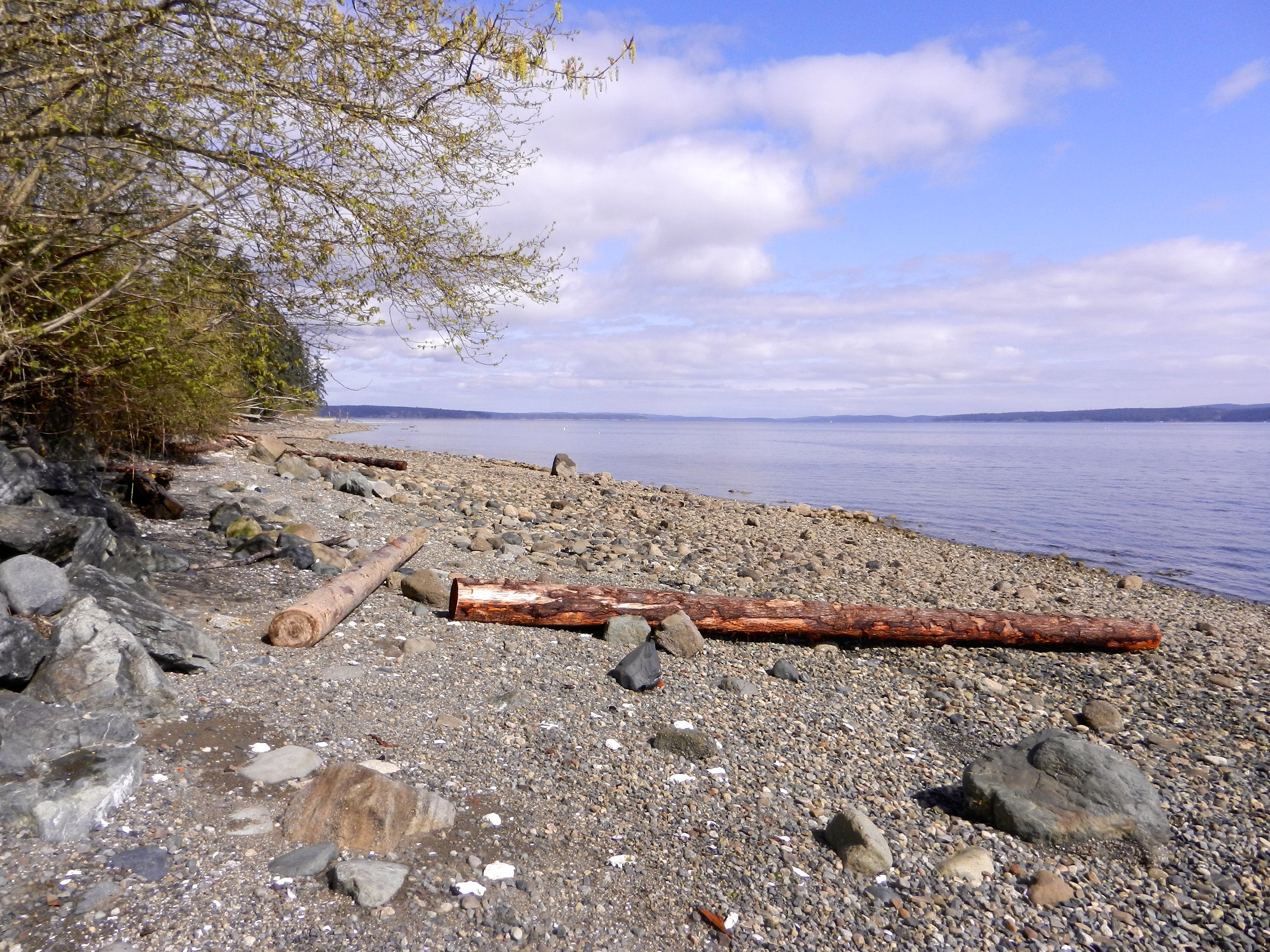
A section of one of the many beaches on Saltair's coastline.
