= Henry Croft =

Lumber and mining magnate

Henry Croft MLA
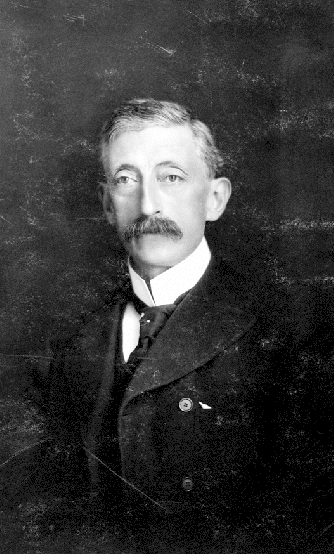

Member of the British Columbia Legislative Assembly for Cowichan
- In office 1886–1894 Serving with Theodore Davie
- Preceded by: Henry Fry
- Succeeded by: Theodore Davie and James Mitchell Mutter

Personal details
- Born: January 15, 1856 Darling Point, Sydney, New South Wales, Australia
- Died: July 28, 1917 (aged 61) Victoria, British Columbia, Canada
- Party: None
- Spouse: Mary Jean Dunsmuir
- Profession: Miner

Henry Croft (January 15, 1856 — July 28, 1917) was an Australian-born lumber and mining magnate on Vancouver Island from the 1880s to 1900s. Born in Australia, Croft moved to England at a young age and was educated there. He moved to Canada in 1883 and became involved in logging, purchasing the sawmill in Chemainus. Croft rose in prominence through his running of the mill, and further enhanced his standing by marrying a daughter of Robert Dunsmuir, a prominent industrialist on Vancouver Island. Croft was elected to the British Columbia Legislature in 1886, representing Cowichan, serving until 1894. He later became involved in mining on Mount Sicker, and founded the town of Crofton, British Columbia in 1902 as a place to house the smelter for mining. Croft is featured on the Netflix series Haunted (Season 3 Episode 2) wherein a family claims to have been haunted by his ghost.

== Biography ==
Croft was born at Darling Point, Sydney, New South Wales, Australia, the youngest of three children. His mother died when Croft was one, so his family moved to England. Croft attended Rugby School and then the Derby School of Mines. In 1883 he moved to Canada to join his brother Ted, who was then on Vancouver Island. Croft arrived in the town of Chemainus in July 1883 and began negotiating to purchase the sawmill there, seeing potential with the E&N Railroad, agreeing to buy the mill in August for $22,000. It was here he met Mary Jean Dunsmuir, daughter of Robert Dunsmuir, a prominent coal miner in the region. Croft and Mary Jean were married on June 29, 1885. Though the wedding itself was small, guests included William Smithe, the Premier of British Columbia, and Theodore Davie, the Attorney-General. Once the E&N Railroad finished construction in 1885, the demand for lumber dropped, and Croft sold his mill to Dunsmuir.

Croft bought 19 acres (7.7 hectares) of waterfront land in Victoria in November 1889 with plans to build a house there, which he named Mount Adelaide after his home in Australia. To help finance this he sold 3 acres (1.2 hectares) to subdivide into lots. Mount Adelaide was completed by 1891, though the financing had not worked out for Croft, who ended up nearly $45,000 in debt; part of his losses came from a real estate investment scam. His mother-in-law Joan Dunsmuir loaned him $20,000 to cover his losses, though by 1895 Croft still owed $58,000 and was forced to declare bankruptcy. A trust led by Joan took ownership of Mount Adelaide, who allowed Croft to remain living there, though Mary had to sign the agreement as Croft had no money.

In 1890, Croft was elected to the British Columbia Legislature with 146 votes, or 34.27% of the ballots, representing the Cowichan region. He served this post for the next four years.

He had developed the prosperous Lenora mine at Mount Sicker in 1898. By 1902, his mine was producing more ore than railway cars could load and haul away to the Ladysmith and Nanaimo ports. Inspired by significant profits, Croft bought a townsite near Mount Sicker and established the town of Crofton to build a copper smelter and house his workers. The smelter would last until 1908 when world copper prices fell, and while there were plans to build a large sawmill, it was never completed.

On July 28, 1917, Croft died at the age of 61 at his home, Mount Adelaide in Victoria from a brain hemorrhage. Mary died on August 15, 1928. They had no children.

== Association ==
Croft was a member of many different societies as a result of his mining involvement:

- Fellow of the Royal Geographical Society
- Member of the Institute of Mining Engineers
- Member of the Institution of Civil Engineers

== Media ==
Croft features on season 3, episode 2 of Netflix's show, Haunted. Wyatt and his family lived in Croft's home and experienced hostile ghostly interactions with Croft. He was seen first allowing his miners to perish after a dynamite incident. He is then seen smoking a cigar before terrorizing one of the family members further, such as pushing him down stairs and setting out fishing hooks as a trap to injure that family member— Wyatt. He is also suspected of causing the suicide of the previous tenant by his hostile actions.

== Bibliography ==
- Elections British Columbia (1988), Electoral History of British Columbia, 1871–1986, Victoria, BC: Queen's Printer for British Columbia, ISBN 0-7718-8677-2
- Francis, Daniel, ed. (1999), Encyclopedia of British Columbia, Vancouver: Harbour Publishing, ISBN 1-55017-200-X
- Haley, P.; Killick, D. (1988), Crofton: The Early Years, Duncan, British Columbia: Duncan Print Craft
- Olsen, D.W. (1981), Water Over the Wheel (Second ed.), Chemainus, British Columbia: Schutz Industries, OCLC 22814461
- Paterson, T.W. (2007), Riches to Ruin: The Boom to Bust Saga of Vancouver Island's Greatest Copper Mine, Duncan, British Columbia: Firgrove Publishing, ISBN 978-0-921271-21-5
- Reksten, Terry (1991), The Dunsmuir Saga, Vancouver, British Columbia: Douglas & McIntyre, ISBN 0-88894-742-9

Political offices
Preceded by Henry Fry	MLA for Cowichan; 1890–1894 with Theodore Davie	Succeeded by Theodore Davie and James Mitchell Mutter (for Cowichan–Alberni)
