= Mill Bay, British Columbia =

Mill Bay
- Unincorporated community
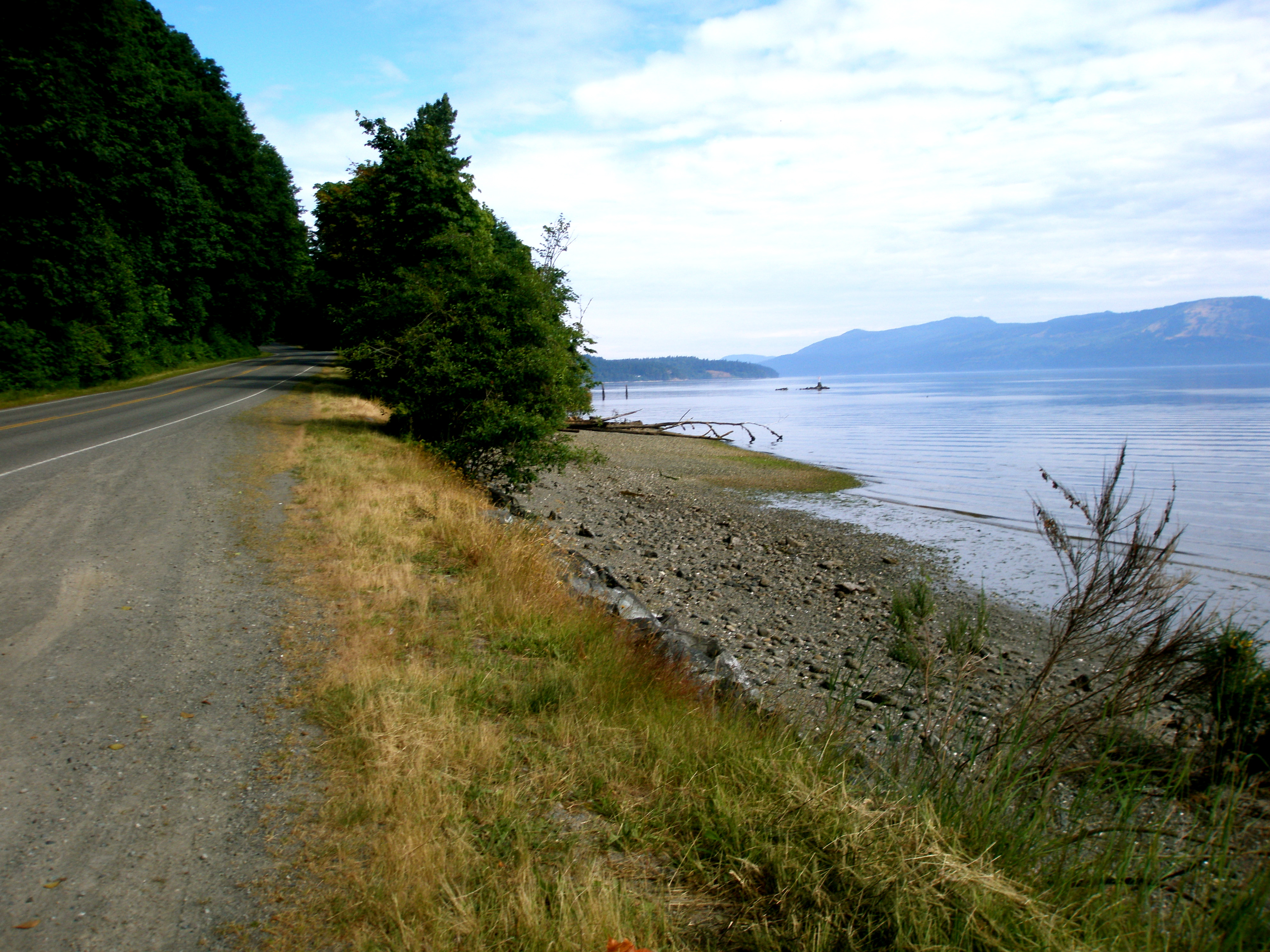

- Location of Mill Bay in British Columbia Mill Bay (British Columbia) Mill Bay (Canada)
- Coordinates: 48°39′02″N 123°33′33″W
- Country: Canada
- Province: British Columbia
- Regional District: Cowichan Valley Regional District
- Time zone: UTC−07:00 (PT)
- Postal code span: V0R 2P0 & V8H
- Area codes: 250, 778

Mill Bay is a commuter town of about 7,200 people located on Vancouver Island, British Columbia, Canada, about 30 km (19 mi) north of Victoria, the capital. It is part of the Cowichan Valley Regional District.

Mill Bay was founded in the 1860s with lumber and milling as its primary industries, done at the mill on the bay. It was named for the sawmill built in the area in 1861 by Henry S. Shepherd soon purchased by William Sayward. It is known for its ferry to Brentwood Bay on the Saanich Peninsula and the historic Malahat Drive, which is also a source of criticism due to frequent closures from either automobile accidents or weather conditions. Numerous suggestions have been made by various groups regarding a 'bypass' route (possibly a bridge), though as of 2007, the Brentwood-Mill Bay Ferry and the Malahat remain the best routes to Greater Victoria from the rest of Vancouver Island (a third route goes south from Lake Cowichan via Port Renfrew to Victoria). The ferry MV Mill Bay that has served the route since 1956 was named for the town but was taken out of service in 2011 and the route is now served by MV Klitsa.

== Mill Bay schools ==
Brentwood College is a private high school located in Mill Bay. Frances Kelsey Secondary School is a local public high school named after pharmacologist Frances Oldham Kelsey.

== Neighbouring communities ==
The village of Shawnigan Lake is a ten-minute drive from Mill Bay. Cobble Hill, Cowichan Bay, and Duncan are also part of the Cowichan Valley.

== Community organizations ==
The Mill Bay Freemasons Hall meets on the third Thursday of the month and also offers room to other community organizations.
