= Chemainus River Provincial Park =

Provincial park in British Columbia

- IUCN category II (national park)
- Location within Vancouver Island Location within British Columbia Location within Cowichan Valley Regional District
- Interactive map of Chemainus River Provincial Park
- Location: Cowichan Valley RD, British Columbia, Canada
- Coordinates: 48°50′28″N 123°49′32″W
- Area: 119 ha (290 acres)
- Established: December 30, 1959
- Governing body: BC Parks

Chemainus River Provincial Park is a provincial park in British Columbia, Canada.

== History ==
The park was established on December 30, 1959. It occupies 119 hectares. It is managed by the Cowichan Valley Regional District.

== Cultural Heritage ==
Chemainus River Park occupies what was once the traditional territories of the Nanaimo First Nation, the Chemainus First Nation, the Cowichan Indian Band and the Cowichan Tribes. The indigenous people used this area for fishing, berry picking and bark stripping. The park also contains the vestiges of a historically significant railway grade.

== Facilities ==
Unlike many other camps in British Columbia, the Chemainus River Provincial Park does not permit camping or campfires. There are facilities for numerous other activities, including canoeing, cycling, fishing, hiking, horseback riding, and swimming.
