= North Cowichan =

- District municipality
- The Corporation of the District of North Cowichan
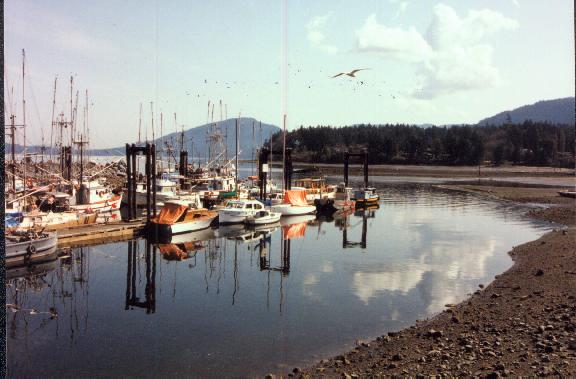
- Motto: No Steps Backwards
- Location of North Cowichan in British Columbia North Cowichan (British Columbia)
- Coordinates: 48°49′29″N 123°43′09″W
- Country: Canada
- Province: British Columbia
- Regional district: Cowichan Valley
- Incorporated: 1873

Government
  - Body: North Cowichan Municipal Council: Krystal Adams; Don Allingham; Chris Istace; Christopher Justice; Derek Masselink; Valerie Russell
  - Mayor: Rob Douglas
  - MP: Jeff Kibble
  - MLA: Bert Chen

Area
  - Total: 195.54 km^{2} (75.50 sq mi)

Population (2021)
  - Total: 31,990
  - Density: 163.7/km^{2} (424/sq mi)
- Time zone: UTC−07:00 (PT)
- Area code: +1-250
- Website: www.northcowichan.ca

North Cowichan (Canada 2021 Census population 31,990) is a district municipality established in 1873 on Vancouver Island, in British Columbia, Canada. The municipality is part of the Cowichan Valley Regional District. North Cowichan is noted for a landscape including forests, beaches, rivers, and lakes. The municipality encompasses the communities of Chemainus; Westholme; Crofton; Maple Bay; and "North Cowichan". The latter is an adjacent to City of Duncan and extending North to the Chemainus River and to Crofton.

== Geography ==
Located on the east coast of southern Vancouver Island, North Cowichan is centrally located immediately north of and adjacent to the city of Duncan and south of Ladysmith. Spanning 193.98 square kilometres, North Cowichan is the largest incorporated municipality by land area on Vancouver Island, and includes the communities of Chemainus, Crofton, Westholme, Maple Bay and North Cowichan.

== Geology ==
The last glacial period, the Fraser Glaciation occurred between 29,000 and 15,000 years ago. The glaciers that formed carved out the Cowichan Valley and left behind glaciers up to 30 metres thick. These fertile lands and mild climate have led to a history rich in agriculture.

== Climate ==
Sheltered by the mountains of the central Island and the Olympic Peninsula, North Cowichan has a temperate, Mediterranean-like climate, with mild, damp winters with little snowfall and warm, dry summers. North Cowichan is classified as a warm-summer mediterranean climate Csb by the Köppen system.

Climate data for North Cowichan
Month	Jan	Feb	Mar	Apr	May	Jun	Jul	Aug	Sep	Oct	Nov	Dec	Year
Record high °C (°F)	13.5 (56.3)	18.5 (65.3)	23.5 (74.3)	28.5 (83.3)	32.0 (89.6)	42.0 (107.6)	37.0 (98.6)	34.5 (94.1)	35 (95)	27 (81)	18 (64)	15 (59)	42.0 (107.6)
Mean daily maximum °C (°F)	6.6 (43.9)	8.6 (47.5)	11.3 (52.3)	14.9 (58.8)	18.5 (65.3)	21 (70)	24.5 (76.1)	24.3 (75.7)	22.5 (72.5)	15.1 (59.2)	9.6 (49.3)	6.1 (43.0)	15.3 (59.5)
Daily mean °C (°F)	3.2 (37.8)	4.3 (39.7)	6.3 (43.3)	9.2 (48.6)	12.4 (54.3)	15.0 (59.0)	17.8 (64.0)	17.5 (63.5)	15.2 (59.4)	10.0 (50.0)	5.9 (42.6)	3.1 (37.6)	10.0 (50.0)
Mean daily minimum °C (°F)	−0.2 (31.6)	−0.1 (31.8)	1.3 (34.3)	3.5 (38.3)	6.3 (43.3)	9.0 (48.2)	11.0 (51.8)	10.7 (51.3)	7.9 (46.2)	4.9 (40.8)	2.2 (36.0)	0.2 (32.4)	4.7 (40.5)
Record low °C (°F)	−14.0 (6.8)	−15.0 (5.0)	−10.0 (14.0)	−3.0 (26.6)	−1.5 (29.3)	2.5 (36.5)	5.0 (41.0)	5.0 (41.0)	0.0 (32.0)	−4.5 (23.9)	−10.5 (13.1)	−15.5 (4.1)	−15.5 (4.1)
Average precipitation mm (inches)	238.0 (9.37)	164.0 (6.46)	133.0 (5.24)	85.0 (3.35)	51.0 (2.01)	40.0 (1.57)	25.0 (0.98)	33.0 (1.30)	28.0 (1.10)	117.0 (4.61)	222.0 (8.74)	229.0 (9.02)	1,365 (53.75)
Source: The Weather Network

== Demographics ==
In the 2021 Census of Population conducted by Statistics Canada, North Cowichan had a population of 31,990 living in 13,741 of its 14,266 total private dwellings, a change of 7.7% from its 2016 population of 29,696. With a land area of 195.41 km^{2} (75.45 sq mi), it had a population density of 163.7/km^{2} (424.0/sq mi) in 2021.

The median family income in 2006 for North Cowichan was $62,125, which is below the British Columbia provincial average of $65,787.

=== Ethnicity ===
Panethnic groups in the District of North Cowichan (1986−2021)
Panethnic group	2021		2016		2011		2006		2001		1996		1991		1986	
Panethnic group	Pop.	%	Pop.	%	Pop.	%	Pop.	%	Pop.	%	Pop.	%	Pop.	%	Pop.	%
European (Note: Statistic includes all persons that did not make up part of a visible minority or an indigenous identity.)	25,875	82.34%	24,585	84.67%	24,880	88.1%	23,705	86.78%	22,695	87.85%	22,505	89.64%	19,105	89.88%	16,665	89.91%
Indigenous	2,860	9.1%	2,380	8.2%	1,985	7.03%	1,880	6.88%	1,570	6.08%	1,225	4.88%	985	4.63%	790	4.26%
South Asian	900	2.86%	870	3%	720	2.55%	1,015	3.72%	995	3.85%	940	3.74%	800	3.76%	795	4.29%
East Asian (Note: Statistic includes total responses of "Chinese", "Korean", and "Japanese" under visible minority section on census.)	640	2.04%	535	1.84%	315	1.12%	340	1.24%	230	0.89%	270	1.08%	175	0.82%	245	1.32%
Southeast Asian (Note: Statistic includes total responses of "Filipino" and "Southeast Asian" under visible minority section on census.)	565	1.8%	370	1.27%	210	0.74%	200	0.73%	175	0.68%	90	0.36%	60	0.28%	25	0.13%
African	280	0.89%	85	0.29%	60	0.21%	45	0.16%	90	0.35%	25	0.1%	55	0.26%	0	0%
Latin American	90	0.29%	65	0.22%	50	0.18%	55	0.2%	30	0.12%	20	0.08%	20	0.09%	15	0.08%
Middle Eastern (Note: Statistic includes total responses of "West Asian" and "Arab" under visible minority section on census.)	85	0.27%	75	0.26%	0	0%	30	0.11%	20	0.08%	0	0%	55	0.26%	0	0%
Other/multiracial (Note: Statistic includes total responses of "Visible minority, n.i.e." and "Multiple visible minorities" under visible minority section on census.)	135	0.43%	65	0.22%	0	0%	35	0.13%	25	0.1%	20	0.08%	—N/a	—N/a	—N/a	—N/a
Total responses	31,425	98.23%	29,035	97.84%	28,240	98.03%	27,315	99.12%	25,835	98.8%	25,105	99.21%	21,255	99.45%	18,535	99.26%
Total population	31,990	100%	29,676	100%	28,807	100%	27,557	100%	26,148	100%	25,305	100%	21,373	100%	18,674	100%
Note: Totals greater than 100% due to multiple origin responses.

=== Religion ===
According to the 2021 census, religious groups in North Cowichan included:

- Irreligion (18,180 persons or 57.9%)
- Christianity (11,885 persons or 37.8%)
- Sikhism (385 persons or 1.2%)
- Islam (160 persons or 0.5%)
- Hinduism (150 persons or 0.5%)
- Buddhism (125 persons or 0.4%)
- Indigenous Spirituality (70 persons or 0.2%)
- Judaism (60 persons or 0.2%)

== Communities ==
- Chemainus
- Crofton
- Maple Bay
- South End (adjacent to the City of Duncan)

== Transportation ==
North Cowichan is serviced by the Maple Bay Airport (YAQ), which offers services to Downtown Vancouver, Vancouver Airport, Ganges on Salt Spring Island and Bedwell Harbour on Pender Island. Service is provided by Saltspring Air and Harbour Air.

The British Columbia Highway 1 traverses the municipality as a four-lane arterial divided highway with signals at major intersections. The speed limit varies between 80 and 90 km/h in the rural areas, lowering to 60 then 50 km/h in the denser urban area near Duncan.

British Columbia Highway 18 connects North Cowichan to Lake Cowichan as a 2-lane facility with a speed limit as high as 100 km/h.

Bus service in the municipality is provided by the Cowichan Valley Regional District with service connecting the North Cowichan communities of Chemainus and Crofton with the south end and Duncan.

North Cowichan is also serviced by the Nanaimo Regional Transit System with daily (except Sunday) service through North Cowichan between Nanaimo and Duncan. The NCX 70 service has a stop at the Cowichan Commons shopping centre in North Cowichan.

North Cowichan has embraced roundabouts at many intersections on its network of municipal roads. As of 2021 North Cowichan has 14 roundabouts.

== Economy ==
The original economic drivers steamed from the abundance of natural resources, including the fur trade, fishing, mining, and the forest industry. Today, the forest industry, retail, construction, manufacturing, and health care are large contributors to the local economy.

== Education ==
North Cowichan lies within the School District 79 Cowichan Valley. There are many elementary schools, and two secondary schools.

North Cowichan is served by one public post secondary educational institution, Vancouver Island University.

== Media outlets ==
North Cowichan is served by three newspapers – the Duncan Journal, the Cowichan Valley Citizen, and the Chemainus Valley Courier. North Cowichan is also serviced by 89.7 Juice FM, a member of Vista Radio.

== Attractions ==
North Cowichan is home to the BC Forest Discovery Centre, the Pacific Northwest Raptors Bird of Prey and Raptor Visitor Center, and the world famous Chemainus Murals.

== Arts ==
The Cowichan Theatre hosts many performers and shows during the year. The Chemainus Theatre Festival features classic and award-winning comedies, musicals and dramas.

== Recreation ==
North Cowichan is home to many recreation centres, including the Cowichan Aquatic Centre, cowichan community Centre, Fuller Lake Arena and the Cowichan Sportsplex. North Cowichan offers numerous parks and hiking trails.

== Power supply ==
The Vancouver Island terminal of the HVDC Vancouver-Island is found here.
