= Burns Bog =

Peat bog in Delta, British Columbia

- Bog
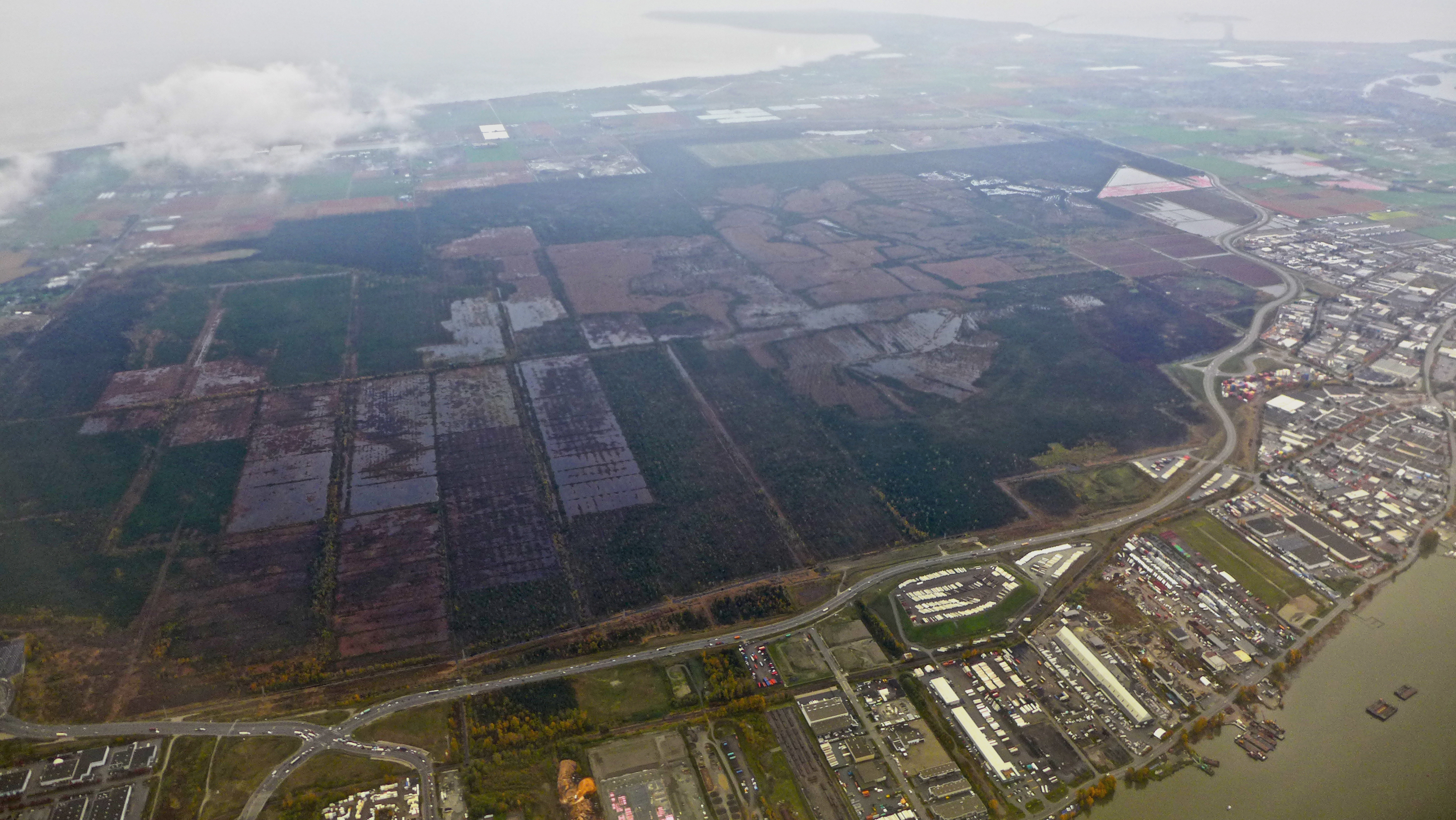
- Aerial view of Burns Bog from the northeast

- Location within British Columbia
- Coordinates: 49°07′15″N 122°58′25″W
- Location: Delta, British Columbia
- Age: ~3,000 years
- Formed by: Sphagnum moss

Area
  - Total: 3,500 hectares (8,600 acres)

Burns Bog is an ombrotrophic peat bog located in Delta, British Columbia, Canada. It is the largest raised peat bog and the largest undeveloped urban land mass on the West Coast of the Americas. Burns Bog was originally 4,000–4,900 hectares (9,900–12,100 acres) before development. Currently, only 3,500 hectares (8,600 acres) remain of the bog.

Burns Bog is habitat to more than 300 plant and animal species, and 175 bird species. Some of these animals are listed as endangered (i.e. red-listed) or vulnerable (i.e. blue-listed) under the BC Provincial Government Species at-risk designations. The bog is also a major migratory stopover for various bird species on the Pacific Flyway.

Burns Bog regulates water as well. The bog prevents flooding, maintains cool water temperatures in nearby rivers, holds water, and releases water in dry conditions. Burns Bog is an estuarine bog since it is situated at the mouth of the Fraser River and next to the Pacific Ocean.

== Ecology ==
=== Characteristics ===
The major characteristics of Burns Bog is that it is wet, acidic, and peat-forming. It is a wetland ecosystem with a diverse array of plant, animal, and insect species. A major component of Burns Bog is sphagnum moss, which is able to hold about 30 times its weight in water. Sphagnum moss can grow under wet and acidic conditions and it is the major building block of peat in Burns Bog.

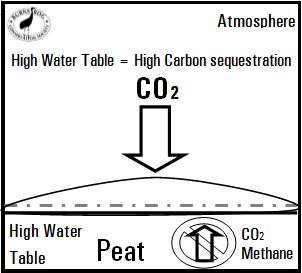
An adequate water table is critical to a bog's survival Diagram designed by Aliya Khan

Breakdown of organic matter in the bog progresses slowly due to low oxygen content and high acidity of the water.

Burns Bog plays a major role in climate regulation. It helps to maintain the health of nearby creeks, which are critical salmon-bearing sites. The peat in the bog does this by cooling and filtering rainwater that comes in. This water then leaches into these salmon-bearing creeks. Burns Bog is also a major carbon sink. Since organic matter decomposes at a very slow rate in the bog, carbon stays in the bog. High acidity and the waterlogged conditions of peatlands such as Burns Bog prevent complete decomposition of fixed carbon. This prevents the carbon from escaping into the atmosphere. European scientists state that an area of peatland the size of a soccer field stores as much carbon as would be generated by driving a family car around the world three times.

=== Formation ===
Burns Bog was formed at the end of the last ice age, which was 10,000 years ago. At the time, the area was covered in huge glaciers. As the earth's atmospheric temperature started to rise, the glaciers melted. Sand, silt, and clay were deposited on top of the ground, which prevented water drainage at this location. This created a big pool of glacial water that had no means of escaping or draining.

6,000 years after glacial melting, the aquatic environment was capable of preserving dead plant material in the form of peat. At this time, peat was composed of grass and woody plants. The depression did not contain sphagnum moss until 3,000 years later. As the peat deposits increased, the main water source changed from nutrient-rich flood water and ground water to nutrient-poor rainfall. Continuous organic matter build-up on the surface of the depression made the peat more acidic. The surface of this wetland slowly separated from groundwater sources, and the environment switched from a fen to a bog. A fen contains more nutrients than a raised peat bog; ergo, the ecosystems are very different. Many years after the appearance of sphagnum moss in the depression, peat accumulated thickest near the centre of the bog. Today, there are 12 species of sphagnum moss that can be found in Burns Bog.

=== Hydrology ===
Burns Bog receives water primarily from rainfall. Water is used by the plants via evaporation, or moved into the air via transpiration. Proper hydrology of the bog is critical to its survival. The water level needs to be high enough so that it can sustain growth of sphagnum moss. A low water table in bogs can lead to irreversible drying of bogland, which can be detrimental to its ecosystem.

In Burns Bog, the water table fluctuates at different times in the year. The water table tends to be high in the fall and winter periods, but drops during the summer months.

=== Biodiversity ===
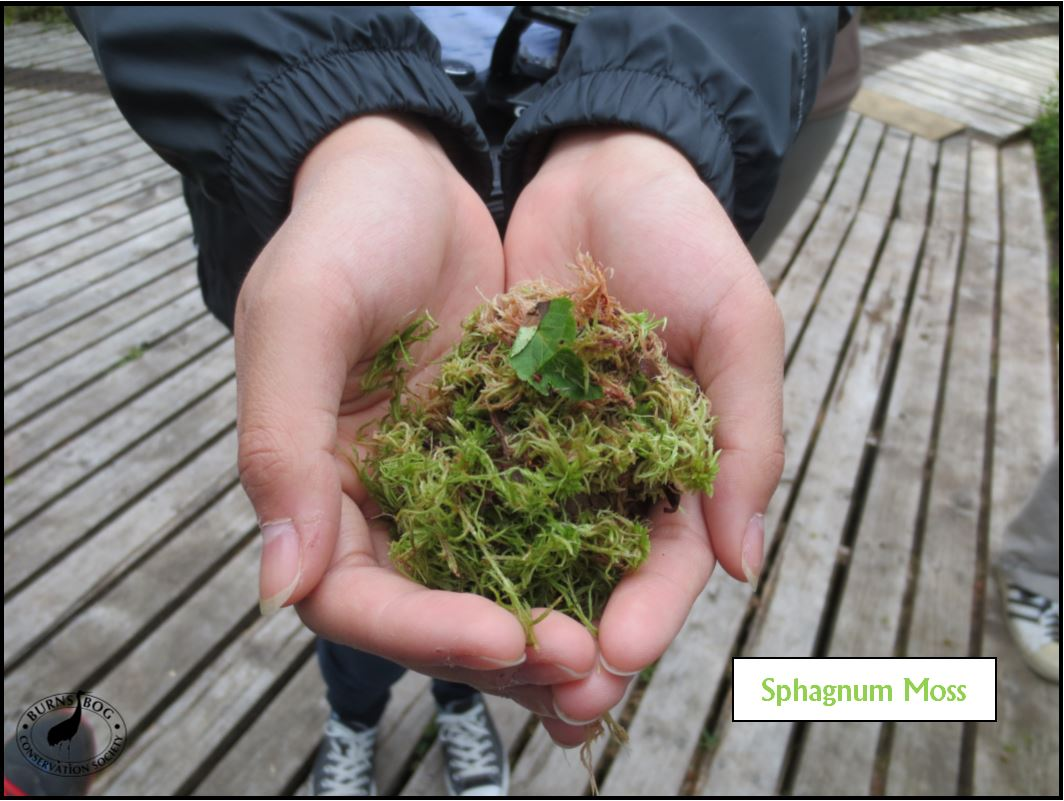
Sphagnum moss is known as a "bog builder." It is critical to Burns Bog's survival.

There are more than 14 different plant communities in Burns Bog. The most important as deemed by the City of Delta are "peat-forming". Peat-forming plants are those that grow in places with a high water table (e.g. sphagnum mosses).

Cloudberries, crowberry, velvet-leaf blueberry, and bog-rosemary are some of the rare plants found in Burns Bog. Carnivorous plant populations reside in the bog as well. The sundew plant can be found in the conservancy area and in the Delta Nature Reserve. Many skunk cabbage plants are seen in the Delta Nature Reserve during the summer months as well.

Burns Bog is home to many animal species. According to the City of Delta, the bog sustains 175 bird species, 11 amphibian species, 41 species of mammals, 6 reptile species, and more than 4,000 invertebrates. The Greater Sandhill Crane, black-tailed deer, dragonflies, and eagles make Burns Bog their home.

Beavers are found in Burns Bog and The Delta Nature Reserve. They live in the banks of the waterways rather than in the lodges. Other animals that can be found in Burns Bog are the redback vole, pacific water shrew, barred owl, great blue heron, snow shoe hare, great horned owl, coyote, geese, ducks, California gull, painted turtle, red-legged frog, and woodpeckers.

Fish have been seen at the edge of Burns Bog, but none are known to live inside the bog. The water is highly acidic and low in oxygen; thus, the fish cannot live in these conditions.

== History ==
=== First Nations land use ===
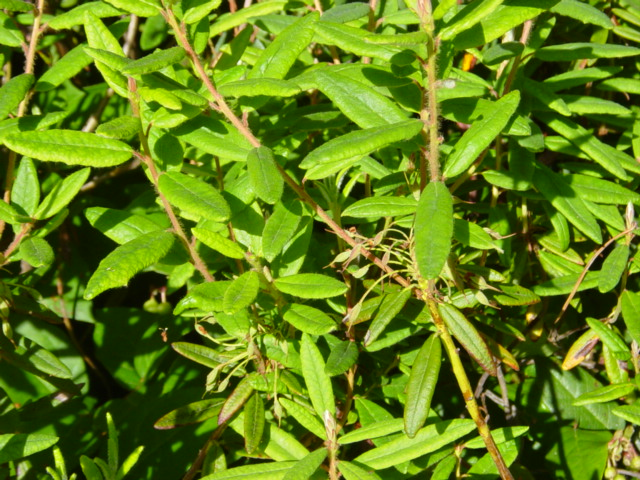
Labrador Tea (taken at the Delta Nature Reserve)

First Nation bands used the land in Burns Bog for thousands of years. These bands were the Tsawwassen, Semiahmoo, Sto:lo, Katzie, and Musqueam First Nations peoples. First Nations practiced the regulated burning of land patches. This was to promote growth of different berries. Berries such as the bog blueberry and cranberry were an important part of their diet.

Another source of food came from animals living in the area. Hunting of black bears, black-tailed deer, elks, and ducks were common. Fishing in the creeks nearby provided First Nations with dietary supplements. In fact, the oldest known fishing archaeological site near Burns Bog is estimated to be 4,500 years old.

Cedar trees in the region were used by First Nations to construct infrastructure, transportation, and clothing. Totem poles were built using cedar as well.

First Nations people utilized some of the plants in Burns Bog for medicinal purposes. Labrador tea, western bog-laurel, sundew plants, and sphagnum moss were used to treat different medical conditions. For example, Labrador tea was used to treat sore throats, and coughs, among many other symptoms. Sphagnum moss was used as diapers and bandaids by the First Nations groups.

=== Modern history ===
In 1905, Dominic Burns and his brother purchased the bog. They wanted to raise cattle and sheep, but the cows were too heavy and easily stuck in the bog. Some of them ate the poisonous plants in the bog. Thus, the cattle farm closed and moved up north. The bog was later named after Dominic Burns.

Peat mining in Burns Bog started in the 1930s. Mined peat was used for agricultural purposes, weapon production, and as a fuel to heat homes. Two peat plants were established in Burns Bog.

During World War II, the US Government purchased peat from Burns Bog to catalyze the formation of firebombs. More than 100,000 bales of peat were shipped to Las Vegas during the war period. By the early 1940s, seventy percent of the bog was affected by peat extraction.

Railways were constructed during the peat harvesting era as well. In the 1950s, a company called Western Peat built 16 kilometres of railway in Burns Bog. The railway still exists in the bog today.

In 1966, Delta, the City of Vancouver, and GVRD struck a deal to move the Vancouver Landfill to the southern region of Burns Bog.

There have been various development plans proposed in Burns Bog. In 1988, Western Delta Lands proposed the development of a deep-sea port on Burns Bog. After much public opposition, Delta Council rejected the proposal. The company tried twice again in 1990 and 1991, but both proposals were defeated.

In 1995, well-known British bog expert David Bellamy visited Burns Bog. Upon seeing its globally unique ecosystem, he urged the community to protect the bog. Bellamy stated that the bog would be protected if it were in Europe. Unfortunately, nothing came of his advice until a few years later.

In 1999, 75% of Delta voters agree to have the government purchase Burns Bog for conservation. The "yes" vote led to taxpayer contribution (0.3% levy included in utility taxes in 2001 for possible purchase of Burns Bog).

Western Delta Lands proposed development plans in Burns Bog yet again in 1999, which prompts an ecosystem review of Burns Bog. A comprehensive study of Burns Bog's ecosystem indicated that 73% of Burns Bog (~2,200 hectares (5,400 acres) of 3,000 hectares (7,400 acres) must be protected to maintain its ecological integrity.

After much public rallying, four levels of government purchase 2,024 hectares (5,000 acres) of land from Western Delta Lands.

== Fires ==
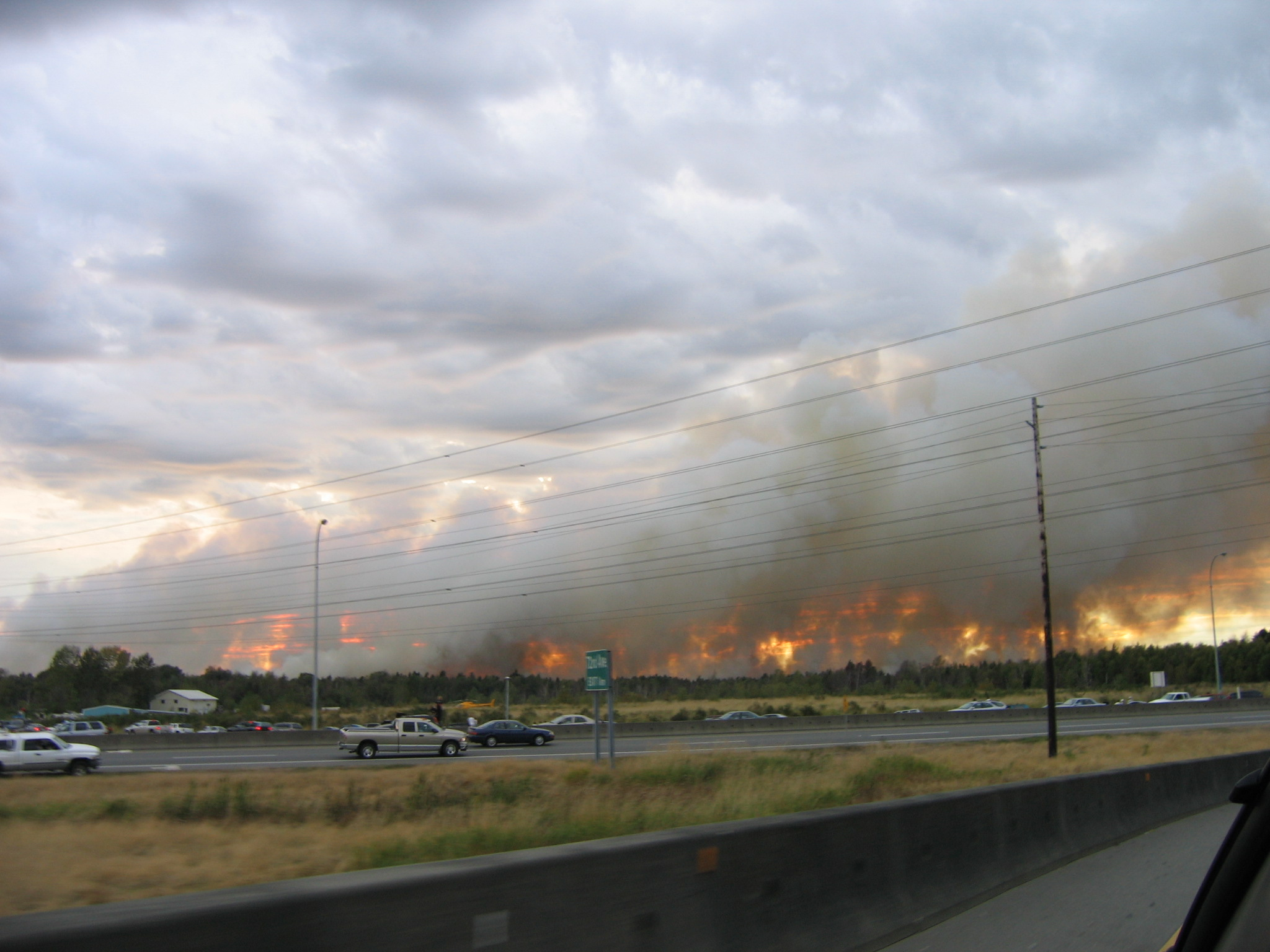
The 2005 fire seen from Highway 91

Dry peat can catch and spread fire rapidly. Thus, fires in Burns Bog can burn underground for months in methane-rich peat. Large fires occurred in Burns Bog in 1977, twice in 1990, 1994, 1996, 2005, 2007, and 2016.

The 1996 fire engulfed the city of Vancouver in smoke and ash for two days. The fire destroyed 200 hectares (490 acres) of land and cost over $200,000 to put out.

Another fire broke out in Burns Bog on September 11, 2005. The fire broke out near the south eastern edge of the bog. Smoke and ash covered the entire Lower Mainland and spread all the way to Nanaimo on Vancouver Island. The fire expanded to 200 hectares (490 acres) hectares after three days. Large-scale fighting methods were used to combat the blaze. This included firebreaks being bulldozed and dikes to raise the water level in the hopes of extinguishing any of the fire burning underground. BC Fire Service's Air Tanker Centre dispatched a fleet of air tankers to assist in putting out the blaze. This included four Firecats, two Convair 580s and the Martin Mars water bombers, which are the world's largest air tankers. Eight days after the fire first set blaze, Delta municipality announced that the fire was in "mop-up" stages.

On July 3, 2016, another fire broke out and grew to 78 hectares (190 acres) over the next three days. More than 100 firefighters battled the blaze using helicopters and air tankers, with additional crew.

== Conservation ==
The Delta community and environmental organizations such as the Burns Bog Conservation Society rallied for the bog's conservation since development plans were first proposed in 1988. Burns Bog was first requested to be designated an ecological reserve came in 1991. The proposal was rejected by most of Delta Council, with plans for reconsideration at the City's Official Community Plan. By 1999, hundreds of letters were sent by the community to Delta Council asking them to save Burns Bog.

In 2004, four levels of government came together to purchase 2,025 hectares (5,000 acres) of land for $73 million. The four levels of government were the federal government, the provincial government, Metro Vancouver, and The Corporation of Delta.

Burns Bog was officially designated as an Ecological Conservancy Area in 2005. Priority of the area was conservation and not public use. A special permit issued by Metro Vancouver is required to enter the conservancy area.

On September 22, 2012, the Ramsar Convention on Wetlands announced designation of Burns Bog as a Ramsar Wetland of International Significance. The bog was listed as part of the Fraser River Delta Ramsar site No. 243, along with South Arm Marshes, Sturgeon Bank, Boundary Bay, Serpentine, and Alaksen.

Burns Bog is listed under the Fraser River Delta Ramsar Site as a wetland of international significance because it is a major migratory bird stopover on the Pacific Flyway. It also provides feeding and roosting for approximately 250,000 migratory and wintering waterfowl, and 1 million shorebirds. The bog is home to a number of endangered and vulnerable animal species.

=== Current threats ===
Today, 525 acres (212 ha) of Burns Bog remains private land. This land is not protected under the conservancy plan set up by the levels of government. Thus, these parcels of land are vulnerable to project proposals.

Development has isolated Burns Bog from other natural areas. Roads cut off safe passageways for animals to get into and out of the bog. This increases the likelihood of animal injury and mortality. The construction of Highway 91 has prevented periodic flooding and drainage that previously fed into the bog. A University of British Columbia study states that construction of Highway 91 and 99 caused Burns Bog to shrink significantly in size. Burns Bog functions as a single living organism. The smaller it gets, the less chance the entire bog has of surviving.

The Vancouver Landfill poses two risks to Burns Bog. The first risk is that breakdown of garbage produces more nutrients, which is the opposite of what a bog needs. The second risk is that there may be contaminated water leeching from the landfill into the bog. Engineers have designed the landfill in a way that minimizes these risks to Burns bog.

While the logging industry and peat mining have come to a halt in Burns Bog, the damage is still being felt today. The City of Delta is working to recover as much of Burns Bog as they can. Metro Vancouver and the City of Delta work alongside university students to monitor the health of Burns Bog. MK Delta Lands Group is proposing to build an industrial park in Burns Bog. The company plans to build west of Highway 91. Construction of an overpass leading to the site and a new water pump to drain the area of bog land is included in their plans. As part of their proposal, MK Delta is giving their other land parcels in Burns Bog (Lot A, B, C) to the City of Delta. The drainage, construction, and noise created from this project would be detrimental to Burns Bog's natural ecosystem. MK Delta Lands Group's application is still in the early stages.

== Public access (The Delta Nature Reserve) ==
Most of Burns Bog is closed off to the public due to safety and conservation concerns. A small portion of Burns Bog is accessible to the public. This area is referred to as the Delta Nature Reserve and is 148 acres (60 ha) in size.

The Delta Nature Reserve gives a glimpse of the bog's lagg zone, which is the transition zone between a peat bog and the external ecosystems. The lagg zone is crucial to the bog's survival. Lagg zones in peat bogs are critical for keeping the high water table of the bog. They are the transition zones between low-nutrient peat bogs and the high-nutrient, or in this case human disturbed, areas. Different ecosystems work together to maintain the health of the bog.

The Burns Bog Conservation Society has built more than 2.5 kilometres (1.6 mi) of boardwalk in the Delta Nature Reserve. They provide a safe and easy access to all members of the community. In February 2017, the City of Delta took over responsibility for the ongoing maintenance of all boardwalks in the Delta Nature Reserve. Metro Vancouver now manages the Delta Nature Reserve.

== See also ==
- Mer Bleue Bog
