= Crofton, British Columbia =

Crofton
- Community
- Location of Crofton in British Columbia Crofton (British Columbia)
- Coordinates: 48°51′49.8″N 123°38′44.6″W
- Country: Canada
- Province: British Columbia
- Region: Vancouver Island
- Regional district: Cowichan Valley Regional District
- Municipality: North Cowichan
- Established: 1902

Population (2021)
  - Total: 1,446
- Time zone: UTC−07:00 (PT)
- Postal code: V0R 1R0

Crofton is a small west coast town within the District of North Cowichan of southern Vancouver Island in British Columbia, east of BC Highway 1 about 74 kilometres (46 mi) north of Victoria.

== Early settlers ==
In the mid-1800s, several families obtained preemptions in the area, upon which they created homesteads, cut timber, and farmed. The 1873 incorporation of the District of North Cowichan included what would become Crofton.

== Smelter & village ==
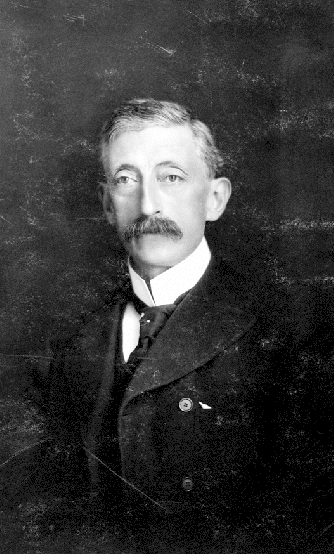
Henry Croft, founder of Crofton

In 1900, Henry Croft purchased land at Osborne Bay for a smelter and townsite. The next year, the Northwestern Smelting and Refining Co. began construction. In 1902, the village was established, the smelter opened, and Croft extended the Lenora Mt. Sicker Railway from his copper mine to Crofton. Mining ceased in late 1902 when the company went into receivership. Having exhausted other ore supplies, the smelter closed in 1903. In 1906, the Britannia Mining & Smelting Company bought the smelter. A customs office existed between 1906 and 1909. Following plummeting copper prices during the Panic of 1907, the smelter closed in January 1908. Rumours of a large sawmill to be built came to nothing, and when Henry Croft died in 1917, his namesake was struggling to survive.

== Logging ==
During the 1910s, the Westholme Lumber Co. was hauling locally harvested logs to Crofton over the narrow gauge line. By the mid-1920s, the Esquimalt and Nanaimo Railway (E&N) was arriving over the new Osborne Bay subdivision (later called the Crofton Spur) to ship out logs from the Osborne Bay wharf. Logging trains brought raw logs out of the bush to be barked in the water and loaded onto ships for export. Lumber was also shipped out by Industrial Timbers Ltd (later to become British Columbia Forest Products Ltd), Western Forest Industries, and MacMillan Bloedel Lumber Co.

== Pulp & paper mill ==
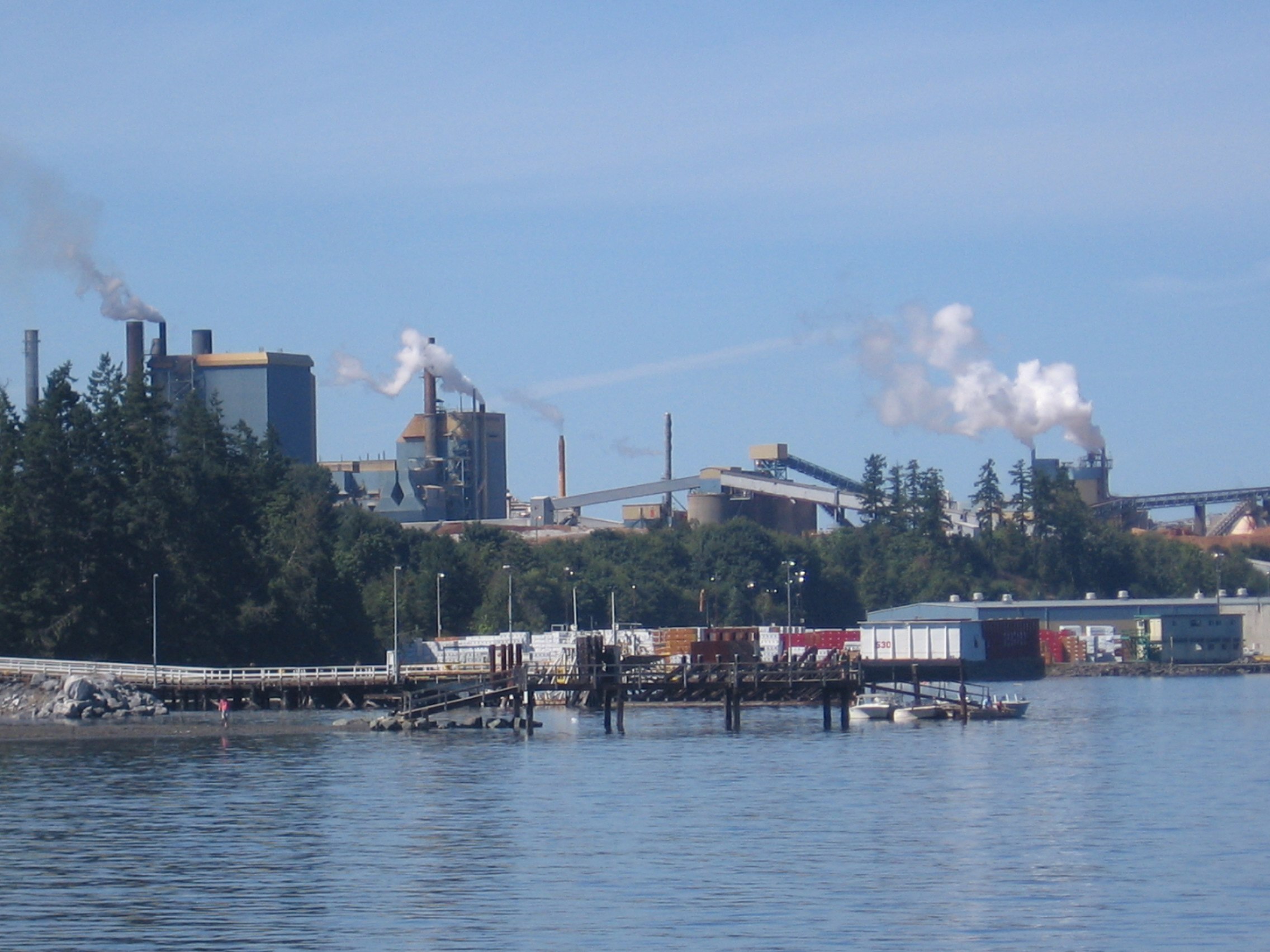
Crofton Mill

The Crofton pulp and paper mill, which opened in 1957, has experienced several changes in the ownership of its parent company.

In 2001, a layer of ash fell upon the town, staining nearly every house. Improper burning at the mill was determined the cause. In response, the mill owners funded the extensive cleanup of Crofton, and improved the burning process.

Concern about mill emissions prompted a Clean Air Concert on September 17, 2004, organized by Randy Bachman, to raise money for a study of those emissions. Among the groups participating were the Barenaked Ladies, Neil Young, Tal Bachman, and Randy himself. The concert was staged in Duncan, the nearest suitable venue.

The pulp mill was permanently closed in early 2026. Domtar, its parent company, cited poor pulp prices and a lack of affordable raw material as the reasons for shutting the mill.

== Ferry terminal ==
The smelter wharf was converted to become the western terminal for the Salt Spring Island ferry service established in 1955. BC Ferries operates the route daily. Some tourist traffic spends time in Crofton.

Census population: Creston
| Year | Pop. | ±% |
|---|---|---|
| 2011 | 1,322 | — |
| 2016 | 1,373 | +3.9% |
| 2021 | 1,446 | +5.3% |
Source: Statistics Canada

== Present community ==
Forestry and recreation have anchored the community in recent decades.

Early in the 1990s. the Crofton Community Centre Society created a scenic walkway along the Crofton shoreline. In 2002, Crofton's 100th anniversary, phase one of the Seawalk was completed. By 2014, all three phases were complete. The Seawalk stretches from the wharf and ferry terminal to Crofton Beach, a distance of over one kilometre.

In 2000, the town water supply was changed from Crofton Lake to the Cowichan River. In September 2006, Crofton was included in a regional bus network connecting to nearby Duncan and Chemainus. Previously, the only public transit was a bus between Victoria and Nanaimo without regional stops.
