= Chemainus =

- Community
- Location of Chemainus in British Columbia Chemainus (British Columbia)
- Coordinates: 48°55′16″N 123°43′1″W
- Country: Canada
- Province: British Columbia
- Region: Vancouver Island
- Regional district: Cowichan Valley Regional District
- Municipality: North Cowichan

Area
  - Total: 4.02 km^{2} (1.55 sq mi)

Population (2021)
  - Total: 4,033
  - Density: 693/km^{2} (1,790/sq mi)
- Demonym: Chemainiac
- Time zone: UTC−07:00 (PT)
- Postal Codes: V0R 1K0, V0R 1K1, V0R 1K2, V0R 1K3, V0R 1K4, V0R 1K5
- Highways: 1
- Waterway: Stewart Channel

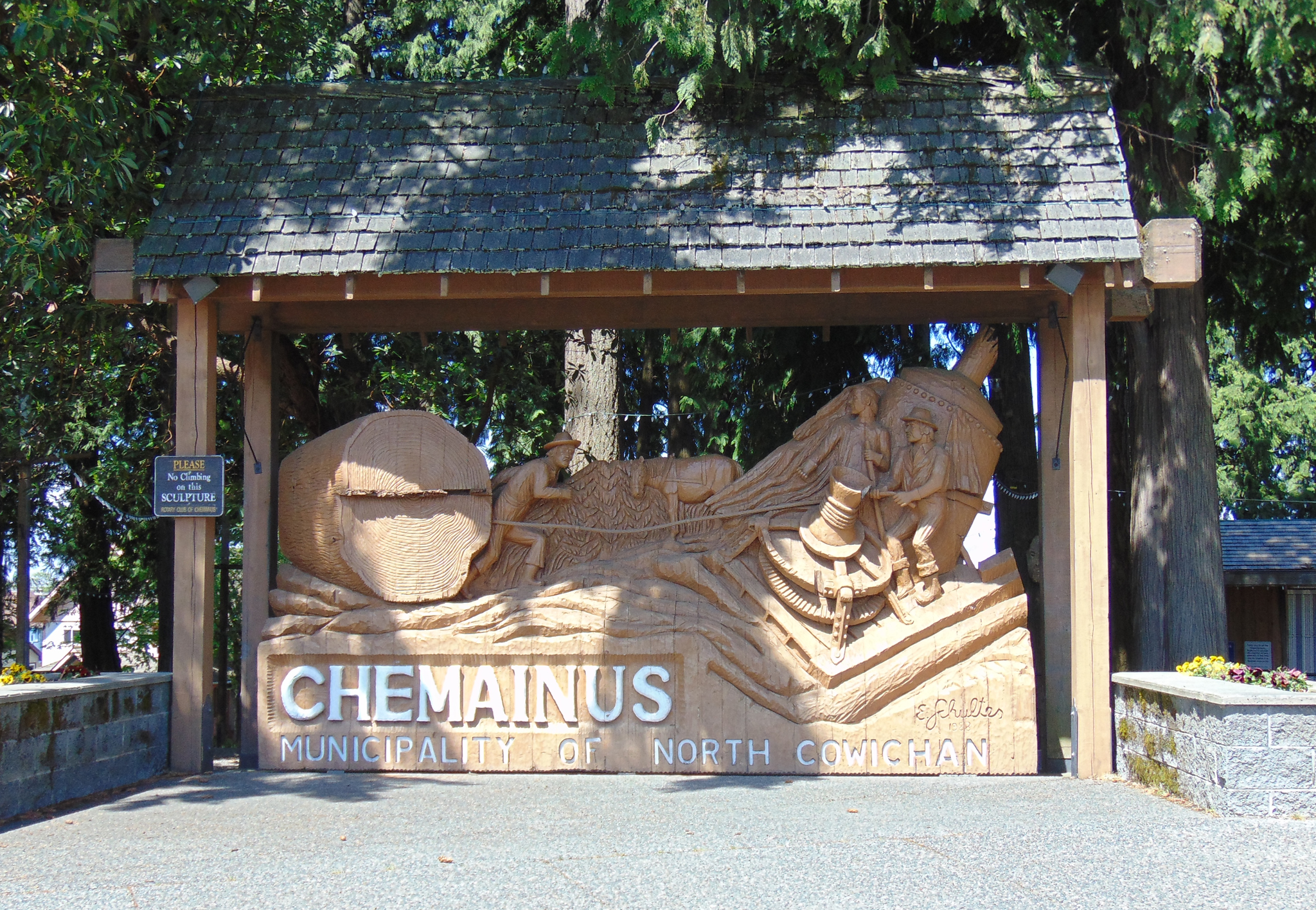
Sign in the town of Chemainus, on Vancouver Island, British Columbia.

Chemainus /ʃəˈmeɪnəs/ is a community within the municipality of North Cowichan in the Chemainus Valley on the east coast of southern Vancouver Island, British Columbia, Canada.

Founded as an unincorporated logging town in 1858, Chemainus is now famous for its 53 outdoor murals. This outdoor gallery has given birth to many businesses, including a theatre, antiques dealers, and eateries. The tourist industry stemming from the murals helped rejuvenate the town after its large sawmill closed in the early 1980s and was replaced by a smaller, more efficient, mill.

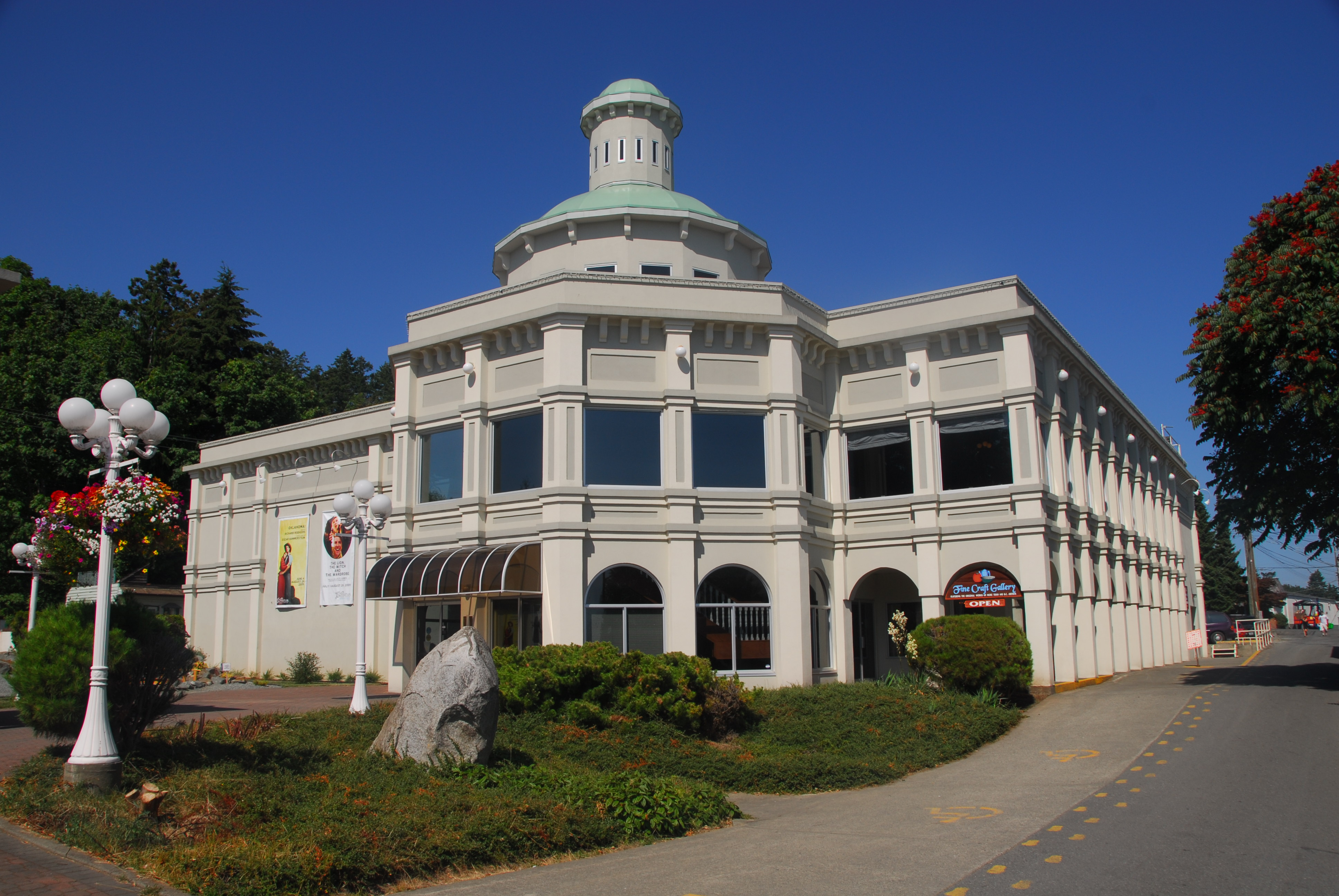
Chemainus Theatre

The name Chemainus comes from the native shaman and prophet "Tsa-meeun-is" meaning broken chest. Legend says that the man survived a massive wound in his chest from an arrow in battle to become a powerful chief. His people took his name to identify their community, the Stz'uminus First Nation, formerly the Chemainus Indian Band.

The railway arrived in the 1880s and by the early 1920s the town's population had ballooned to 600 persons. Chemainus was eventually designated a census populated area by Statistics Canada comprising the more built-up residential and commercial neighbourhoods. Its population had further grown to 3,035 residents by 2011. A larger more inclusive Chemainus area is customarily regarded as comprising part of the District of North Cowichan that lies north of the Chemainus River. This is the area covered by the Chemainus Advisory Committee set up as a consultation body by North Cowichan.

Chemainus Secondary School is located in the town, and serves as a secondary school for students living in Chemainus, Crofton, and Saltair.

A BC Ferry terminal is located in Chemainus, which provides service to Thetis Island and Penelakut Island (previously Kuper).

On 13 January 2006, a Boeing 737 aircraft was sunk off the coast in order to build an artificial reef. The sinking was documented in "Sinking Wings", an episode of Mega Builders, a Discovery Channel series.

== Economic development post-Fordism ==
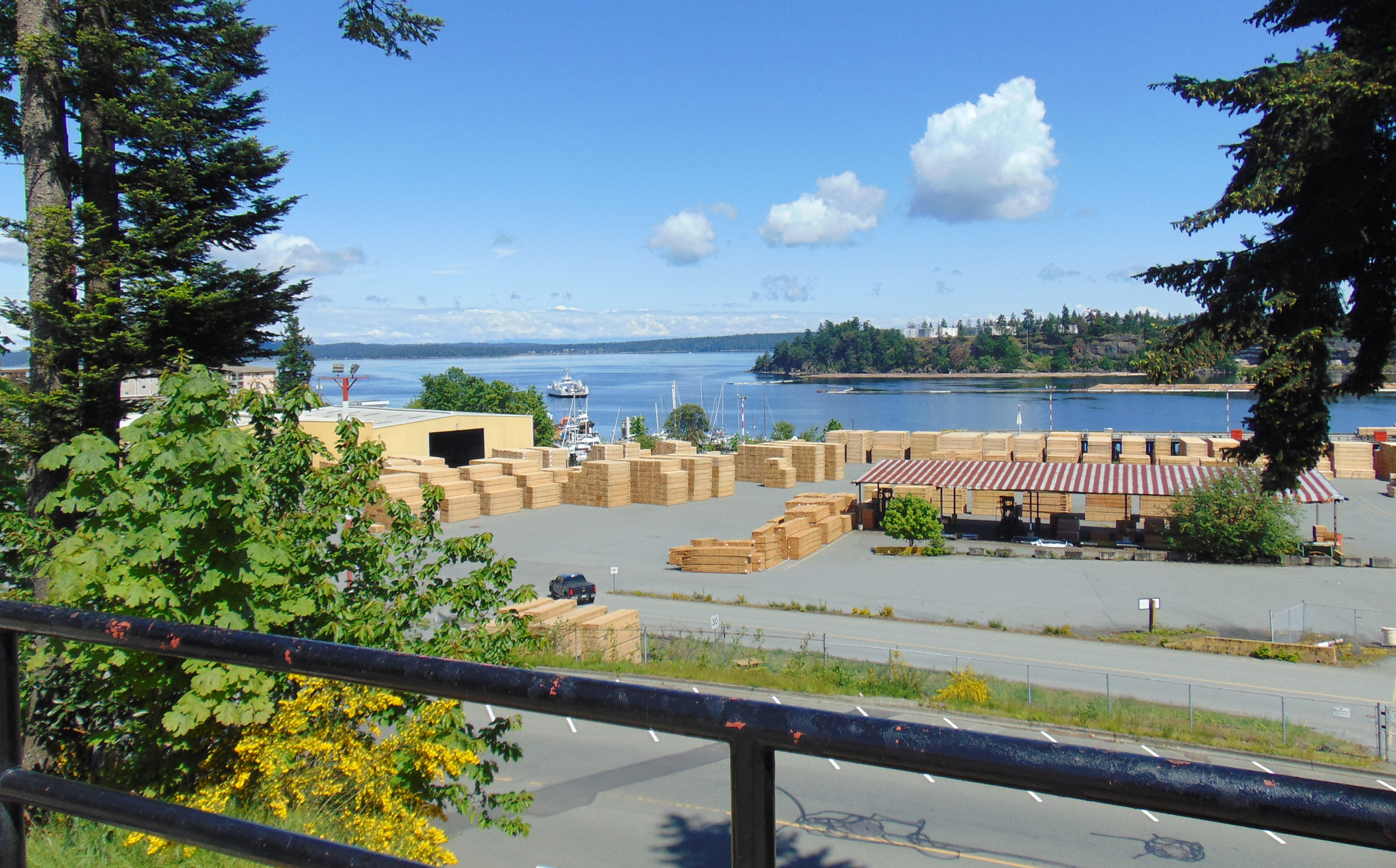
Lumber stacked on the dock at Chemainus, on Vancouver Island, British Columbia, to be loaded on a freighter for export

In the 1980s, British Columbia's forest industry experienced a period of deep recession, largely caused by a substantial decrease in demand and price of B.C. forest products. This decrease came as a consequence of increases in global competition within forest product markets, the reduction in B.C. forest stocks, the placing of tariffs on B.C. forest imports to the United States, issues regarding aboriginal land claims and the increased public support for environmental groups.

Scholars view this recession more importantly as a representation of a larger structural shift from a Fordist economic production system underpinning many North American industries, toward one of Post-Fordism. Fordism is a system of production methods based on principles of specialized mass production technologies, aimed at capturing economies of scale. However, due to rising global competition, energy crises, stagflation and recession, Fordism began to unravel. Consequently, a new system of economic production, characterized by greater flexibility and the exploitation of economies of scope, known as Post-Fordism, began to emerge.

This transition placed a heavy burden on coastal single-industry forest communities like Chemainus due to rising unemployment. At Chemainus, Post-Fordist restructuring of B.C.'s Forest industry resulted in a large overhaul of the local sawmill owned by the Macmillan Bloedel company (a CPR subsidiary). Automated, state-of-the-art machinery was installed which allowed for greater flexibility in producing a larger range of products and greater ease in meeting varied market demands. This restructuring however led to a reduction in the amount workers necessary for its operation: a decrease from about 600 workers to 145 workers.

However, the declining forest industry in Chemainus has led to a drive to diversify the local economy. Chemainus has been successful in growing its tourist industry through the entrepreneurial activities of local citizens. Key projects include the revitalization of Chemainus' main street, through painting a series of large outdoor murals, as well as the construction of a shopping mall about a kilometer away. Horse-drawn mural tours have been around since the early 1980s providing guided tours.

Chemainus' geographical location, between Vancouver Island's largest cities, Victoria and Nanaimo, as well as its proximity to ferry terminals and the coast island highway has also contributed to the successful growth of tourism in the community.

While tourism activities represent a new feature of Chemainus' economy, the forest industry is still the largest industry in the community. Chemainus' restructured sawmill is profitable, and newer developments such as Chemainus' industrial park have been completed, attracting a number of re-manufacturing firms including Plenks Wood Centre and Paulcan.

Despite Chemainus being heralded as a rare case of successful economic redevelopment within small resource communities, there are still some uncertainties facing its continued development into the future. Some note that the initial redevelopment projects in Chemainus such as the painting of large murals and other revitalization projects depended on funding from the government. This funding has largely disappeared and some have observed a reduction of opportunities for entrepreneurialism.
