= Koksilah =

Koksilah is an anglicization of Hwulqwselu, a Hunʼqumiʼnum word meaning "place of snags" and adapted to mean a corral, in reference to the community that grew up around a settler's homestead which had one. It may refer to:

- Koksilah, British Columbia, a community just southeast of the City of Duncan, British Columbia
- the Koksilah River, which is the namesake of the community
  - Koksilah River Provincial Park, a protected area
  - Koksilah River Falls, a waterfall on the Koksilah River
- Koksilah Ridge, a mountain in the area
