= Eagle Heights =

Elevated area in Canada

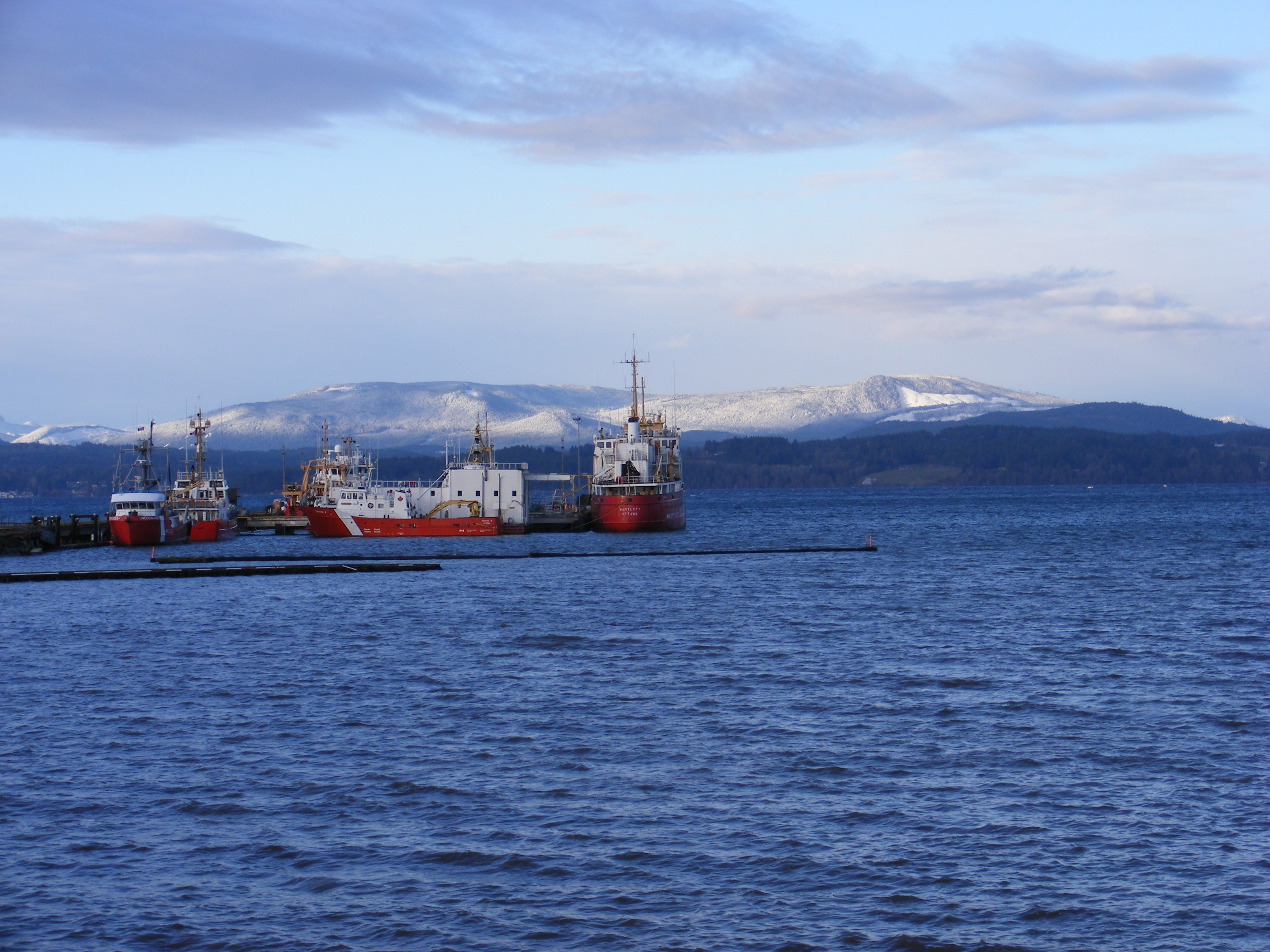
Eagle Heights (left) and Koksilah Ridge (right) shortly after dawn on a December day, looking west across Patricia Bay and Saanich Inlet from North Saanich

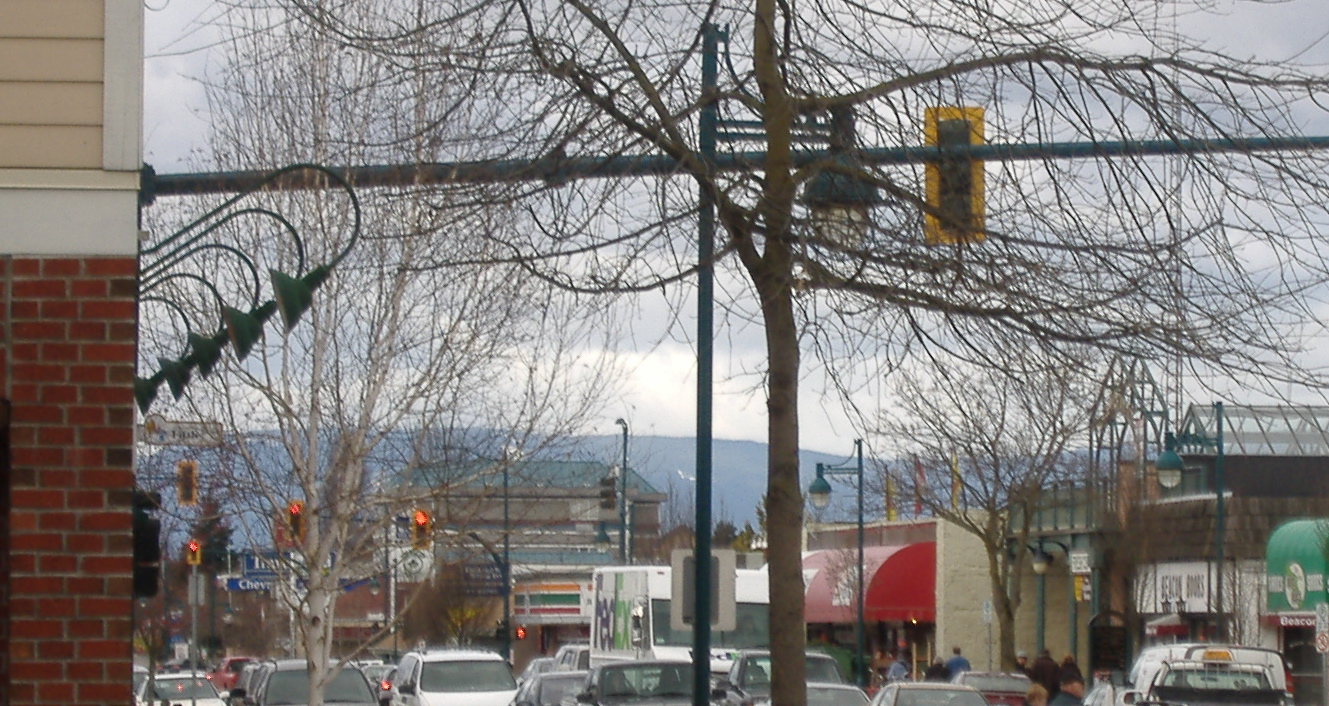
Eagle Heights as seen from downtown Sidney, looking west along Beacon Avenue

Eagle Heights is an elevated area located south of Koksilah Ridge on Vancouver Island, British Columbia, Canada. It is centered at 48°40′N, 123°46′W. Its summit lies about 836 meters (2,743 feet) above sea level. Populated areas where it is visible include North Saanich, Sidney, and Shawnigan Lake.

Its bedrock lithology is dominated by Upper Triassic period basalt at and around the summit. This formation is bordered on the west by Jurassic period volcanics which are of more variable composition. To the north, east and south is a complex of Pennsylvanian age argillite, chert, diabase and greywacke. A band of limestone lies within this complex on the southeast side between 550 and 610 meters (1,800 and 2,000 ft).

Most soils on Eagle Heights are shallow, stony gravelly sandy loams with podzol profile development and mapped as Quimper series. The forests they support belong to the Coastal Western Hemlock zone with Douglas-fir, western hemlock and western red cedar as the most common trees. In May 2018 some lower elevations supporting old-growth Douglas-fir and numerous rare plant species were given protected status, possibly to be incorporated with Koksilah River Provincial Park.

Loggers have harvested Eagle Heights over the years, leaving clear-cut areas which are most eye-catching when a snow cover is present. A particularly large clear area was present around the summit in the 1970s. This has since regenerated to native coniferous forest. In recent years the Heights were logged less heavily than neighbouring hills until new logging activity by Island Timberlands began on mid-elevations of the eastern slope in 2011. Mountain bike trails are also active and at least one of them leads to the summit.
