= Koksilah, British Columbia =

Human settlement in British Columbia, Canada

Coordinates: 48°46′00″N 123°41′00″W

Koksilah is a community located just southeast of the City of Duncan, British Columbia, Canada. Its name is derived, via that of the Koksilah River, from that of the Hwulqwselu people, one of the Hǝn̓q̓ǝmin̓ǝm̓-speaking peoples of the area today organized as the Cowichan Tribes and government.

== See also ==
- Koksilah River Provincial Park
