= Wildstands =

Wildstands is a community alliance initiative supporting awareness of British Columbia (BC) forestry issues, protecting wilderness on Cortes Island from unsustainable logging practices, and promoting positive solutions for logging in the region.

An industrial logging machine is mowing down Vancouver Island forests at an accelerating rate for the purpose of raw log export. Corporate owners with close yet complex relationships and recurring faces view these forests as distressed assets in need of liquidation. The government of BC, hungry for short-term cash, clears the way for them.

News of the proposed logging on the island of 1,000 has attracted about 6,000 signatures to an anti-logging petition and planning is underway to stop Island Timberlands in its tracks. The petition demands that Island Timberlands and its parent company, Brookfield Asset Management, retain all remnants of old-growth forest, protect all watersheds and salmonid habitat, respect all the goals of the BC Sensitive Ecosystem Inventory and ban use of clear-cut logging methods.
