= Koksilah Ridge =

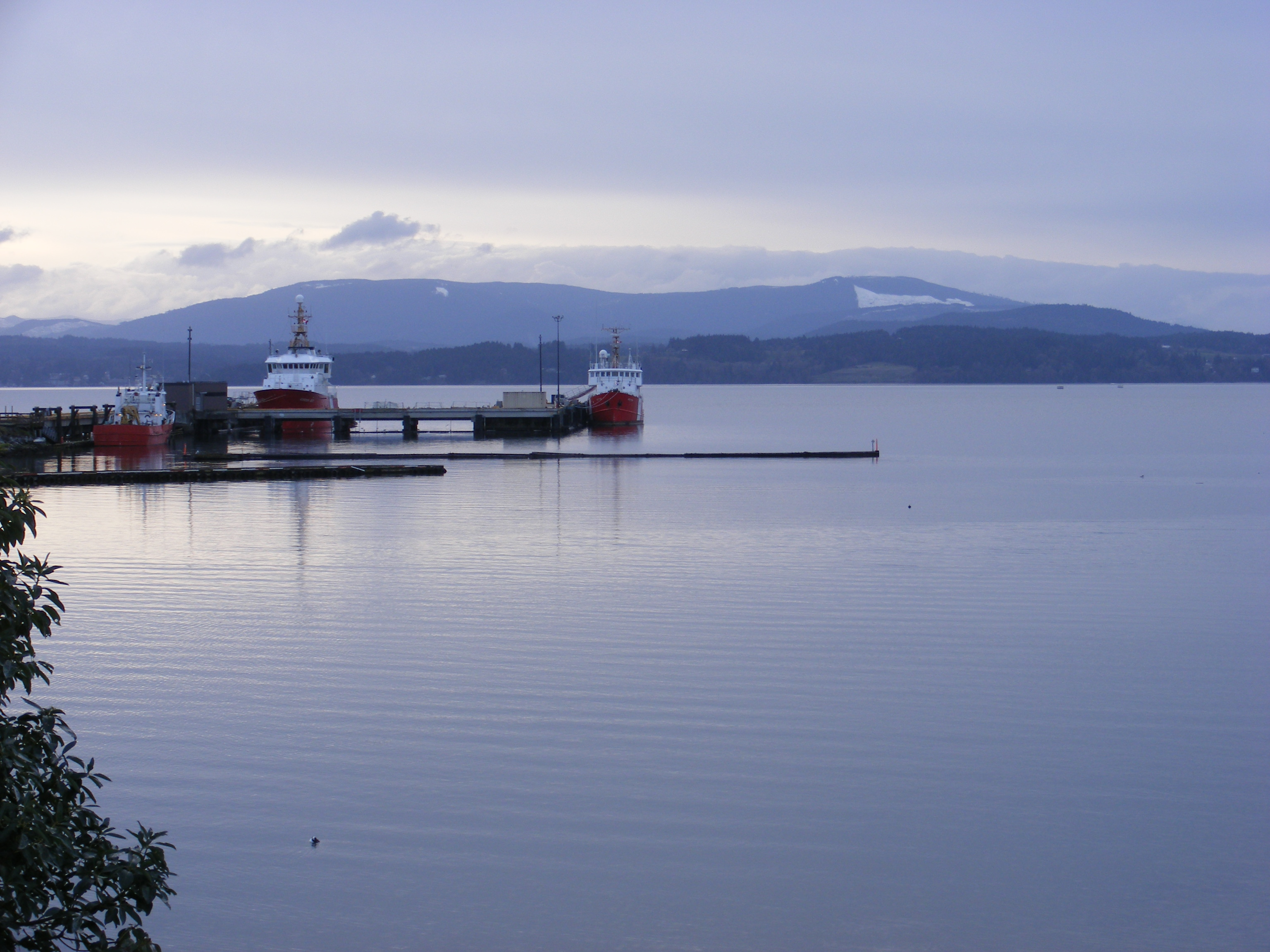
Eagle Heights (left) with Koksilah Ridge to the north, looking west across Saanich Inlet from North Saanich on 13 March 2010.

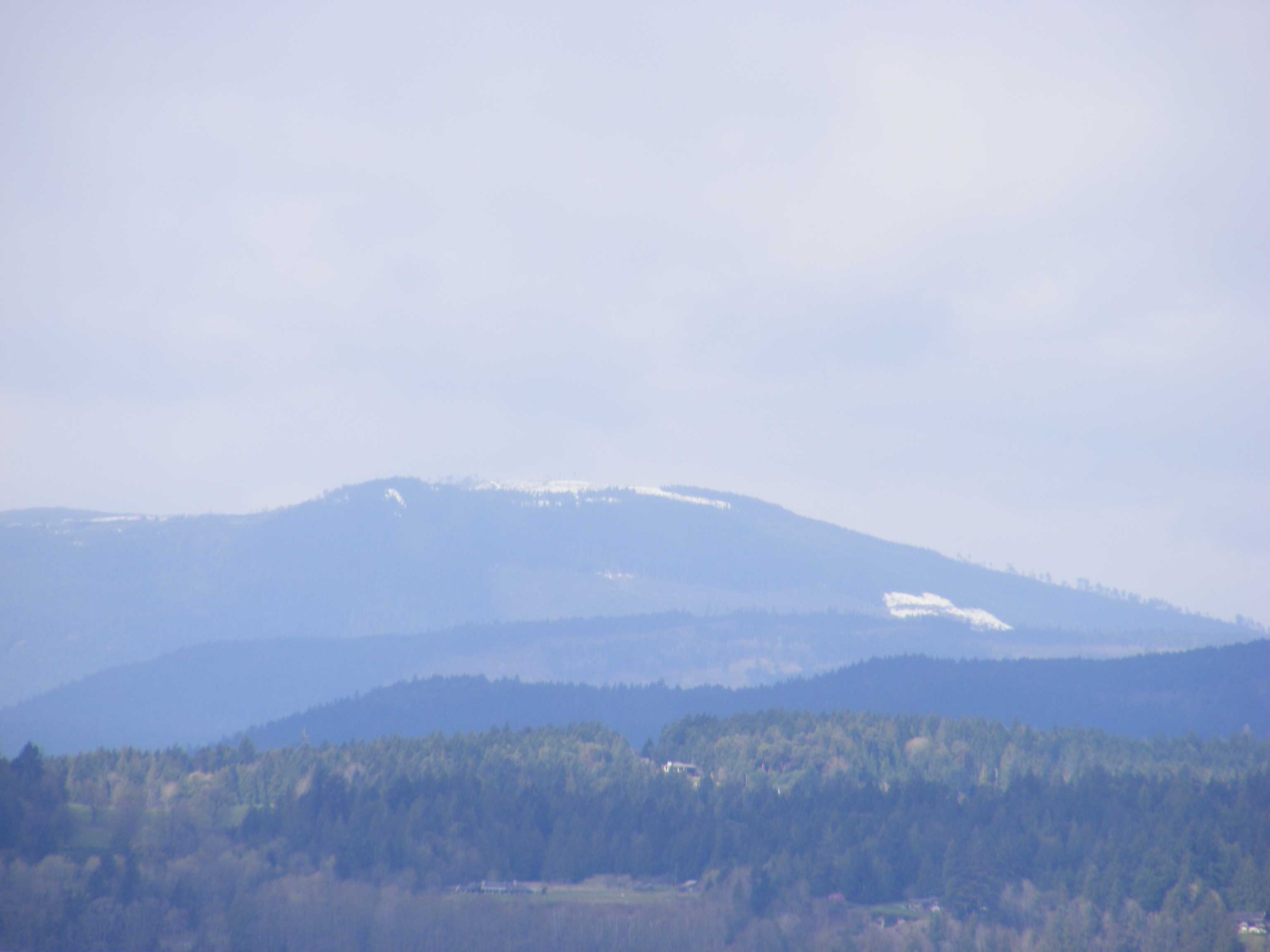
Koksilah Ridge shows its snowy clear cuts, 10 April 2008. To the left (south) of the lowest snow patch is a "grin"-shaped area of young second-growth vegetation which will later be cleared (see image below).

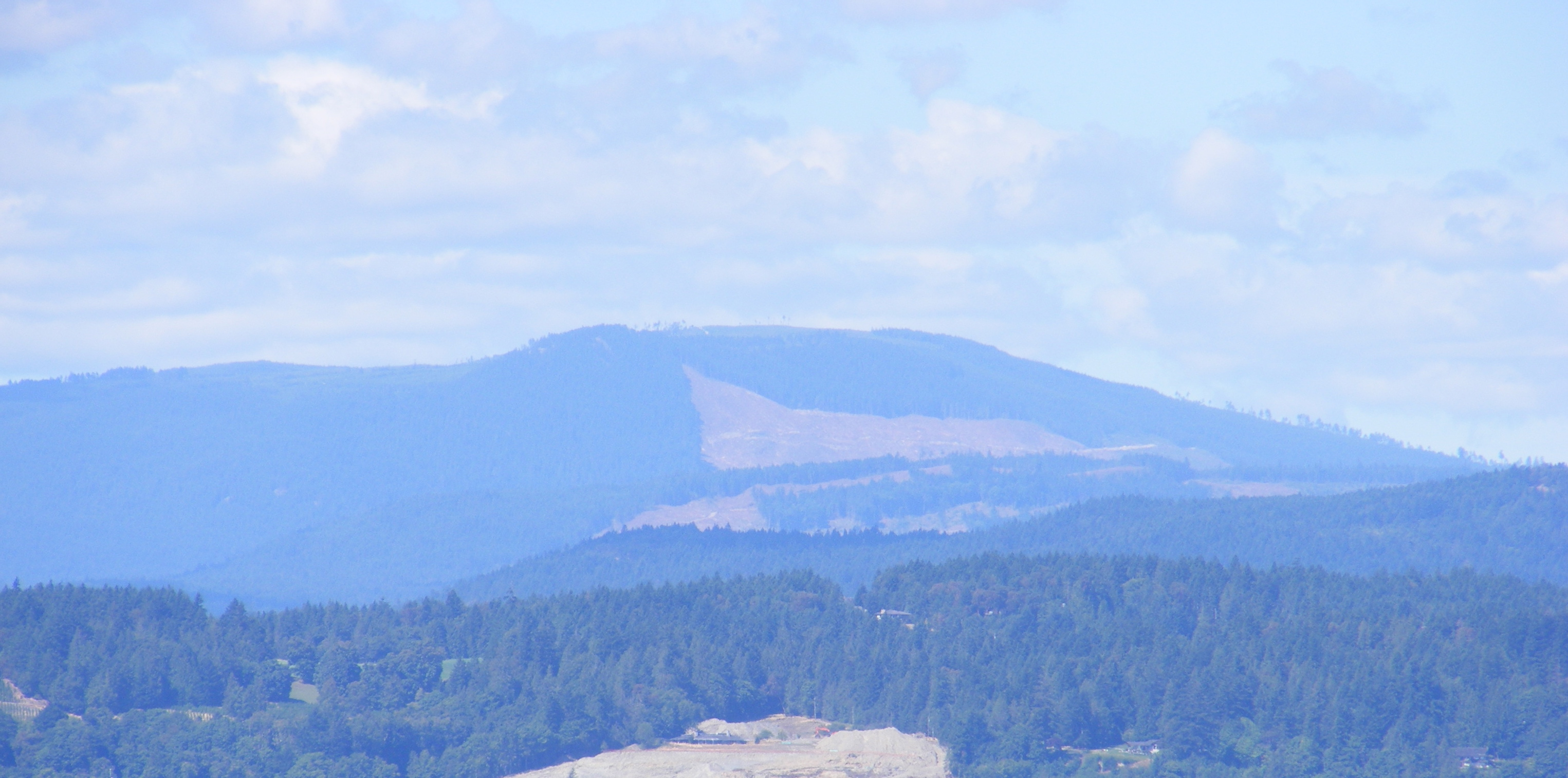
Koksilah Ridge on 13 August 2008, showing brown cleared-off "grin." Note the change of extent since April on the upper southern side.

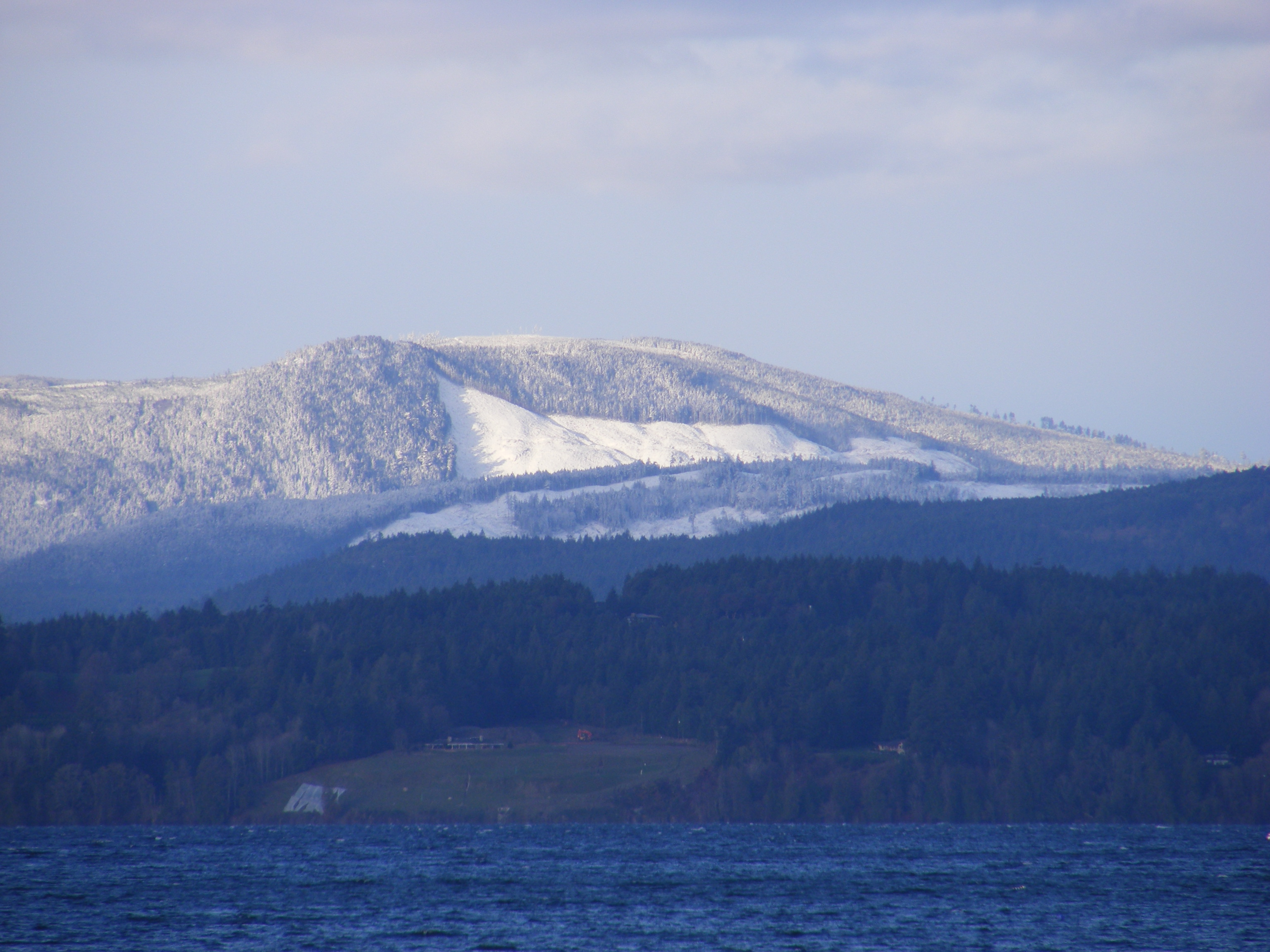
Koksilah Ridge on 13 December 2008, one day after its first snowfall of the season.

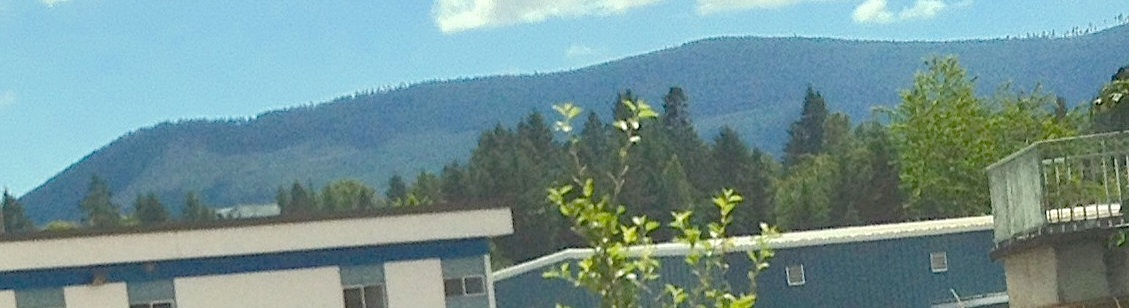
Koksilah Ridge as seen from Duncan, 19 June 2015. The area which was cleared in 2008 has become green with new vegetation.

Koksilah Ridge (Hwsalu'utsum) is an elevated area located south of the Cowichan Valley on Vancouver Island, British Columbia. It is centered at 48°42′N, 123°47′W. Its summit lies about 892 meters (2,927 feet) above sea level. It is visible in most of the Cowichan Valley and on the Saanich Peninsula north of Brentwood Bay. As seen from North Saanich or Sidney, it is plough-shaped, with long gentle slopes.

From north to south, the bedrock lithology begins with Cretaceous-era sedimentary rock, chiefly shale, sandstone and conglomerate. These sediments extend up to about 250–500 meters (820–1,640 ft). Above them lies a pluton of Jurassic-age granodiorite, which underlies the summit. Around the eastern, southern and western edges of this pluton is a complex association of Pennsylvanian-era argillite, greywacke, chert and diabase.

The soils of Koksilah Ridge are well or rapidly drained gravelly sandy loams and gravelly loamy sands with podzol profile development, mainly mapped as Quimper series. They support Coastal Western Hemlock-type forests in which Douglas-fir and western hemlock are most common at lower elevations. These forests are classified under the provincial Biogeoclimactic Ecosystem Classification as Coastal Western Hemlock, Very Dry Maritime Subzone (CWHxm2). Areas above 700 meters (2,300 feet) are mapped as Coastal Western Hemlock, Moist Maritime Subzone (CWHmm2), with abundant Douglas-fir, amabilis fir, and western hemlock.

The forest industry has been active on Koksilah Ridge for many years and the native forest is interrupted by logged-off areas of varying size. These clear cuts are prominent when a snow cover is present. Snow may lie on the higher parts for up to six months over a severe winter, but is seen on only a few days through a mild winter. Island Timberlands presently has tenure.

Lois Lake is a man-made body of water several hundred meters across which lies 1.3 kilometers west of the summit at an elevation of about 730 meters. As of 1988 fish were not established in this lake and there were no plans to stock it with any fish species due to a lack of recreational use. Logging roads ring the lake and a driveway from one of them ("Lois Lake Road") extends to the lake's northern end. In 2020, Lois Lake was listed among lakes which were scheduled to be stocked with rainbow and cutthroat trout.
