= Koksilah River =

Watercourse in British Columbia, Canada

Coordinates: 48°45′03″N 123°38′29″W

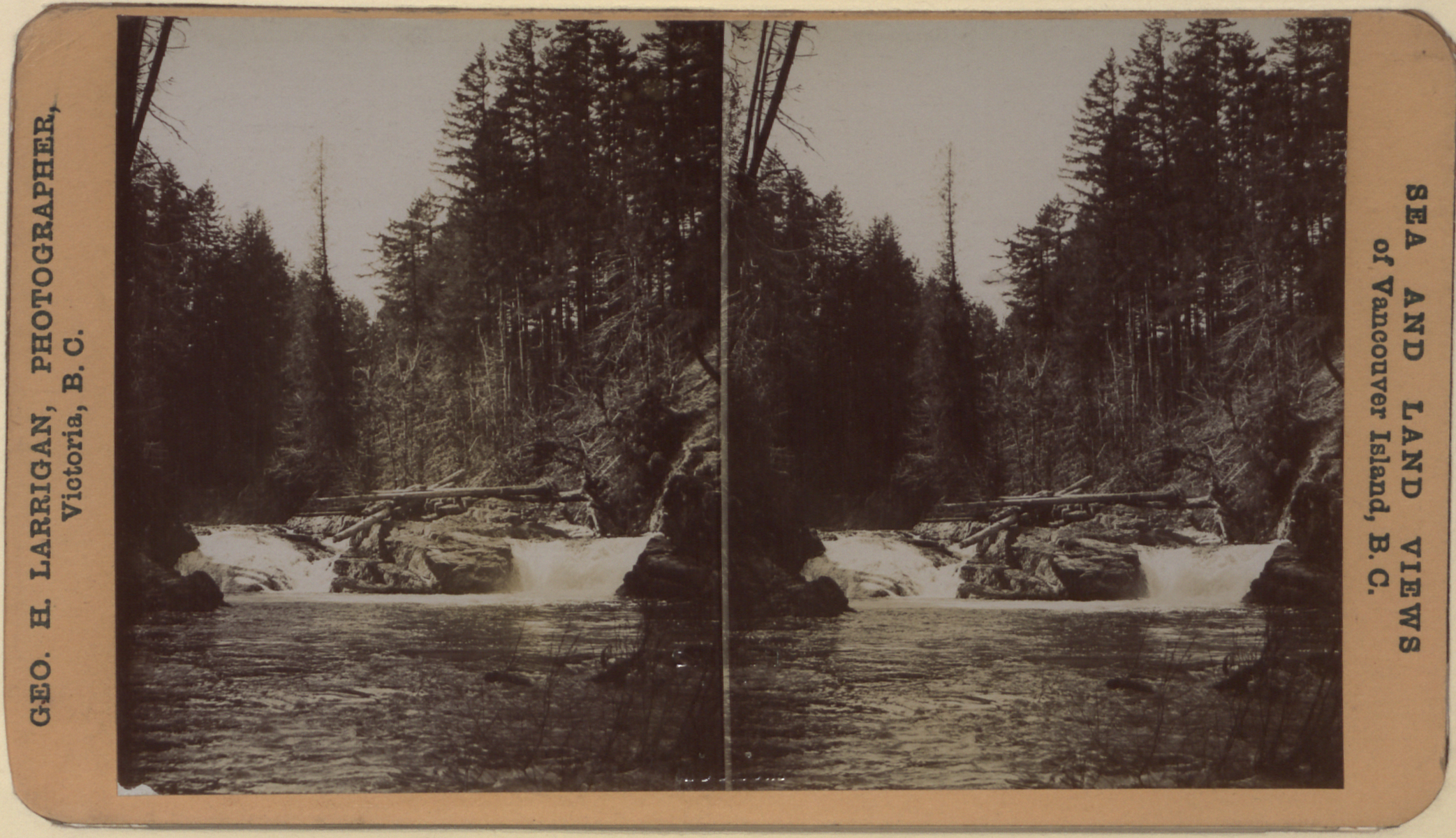
Koksilah River Falls, stereoscopic pair, 1901, George Henry Larrigan.

The Koksilah River (/koʊkˈsaɪlə/) is a river on Vancouver Island, British Columbia, Canada, flowing northeast to enter Cowichan Bay just southeast of the City of Duncan. Part of the river is protected as Koksilah River Provincial Park. It is the namesake of the community of Koksilah, which is just southeast of Duncan. Kinsol Trestle is built across the river.

== Name origin ==
The name is derived from that of the Hwulqwselu people, one of the groups today represented by the Cowichan Tribes band government. Translated from xwilkw' sale, a Hunʼqumiʼnum word translating as "place having snags", it is a reference to a corral. A settler in the 1880s, Jonathan Elliott of Devonshire, had married the chief's daughter. As per native custom, others settled near him, prompted him to build a corral to keep them off. Remains of the corral remained and became the name of the community and people. Another version of the meaning, by a Tzouhalem band member given in 1959, is "poling up the river".

== See also ==
- List of rivers of British Columbia
