= Kinsol Trestle =

Railway bridge on Vancouver Island, Canada

Coordinates: 48.6684265°N 123.6938238°W

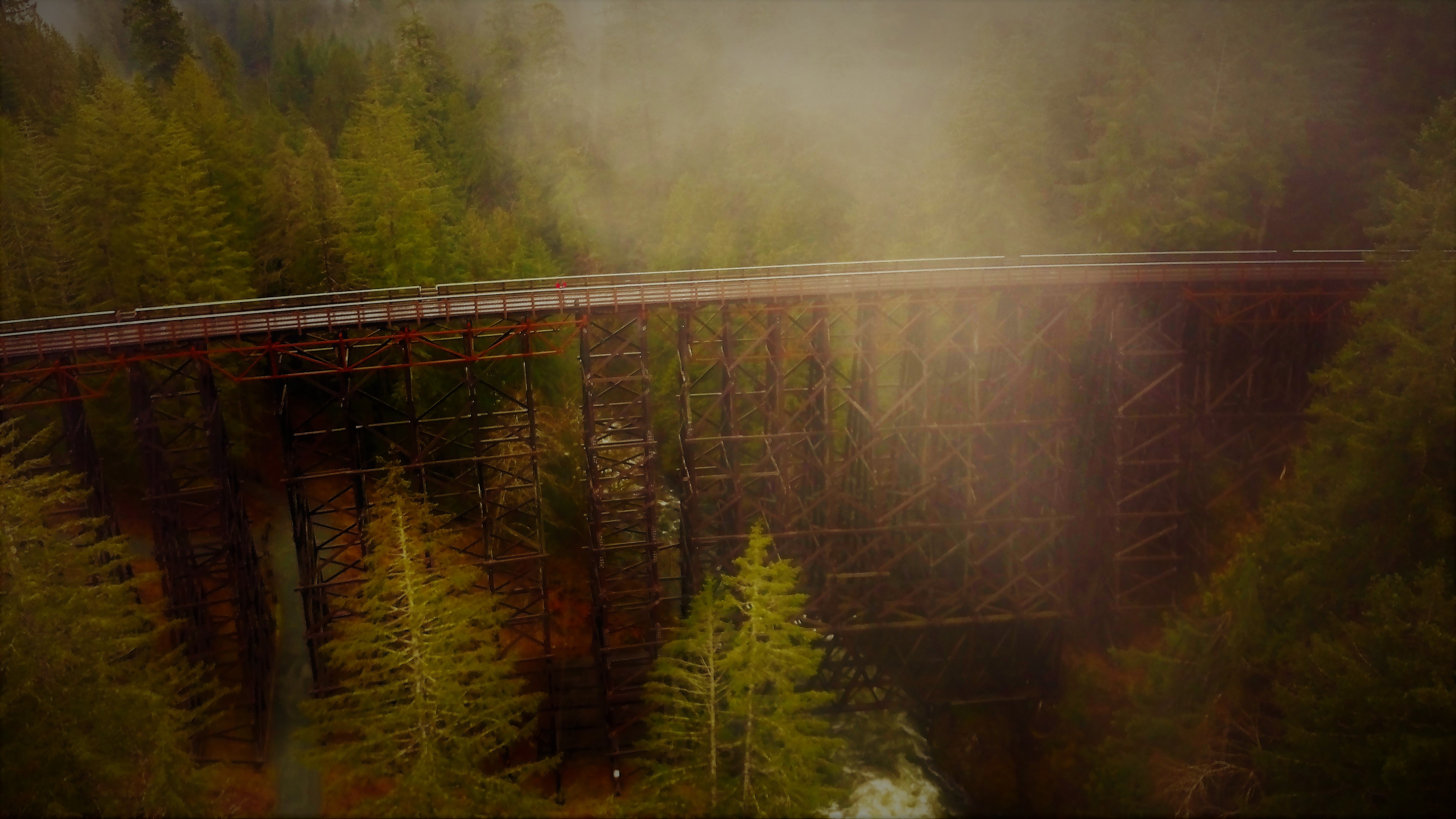
Photo from drone, taken in January 2018.

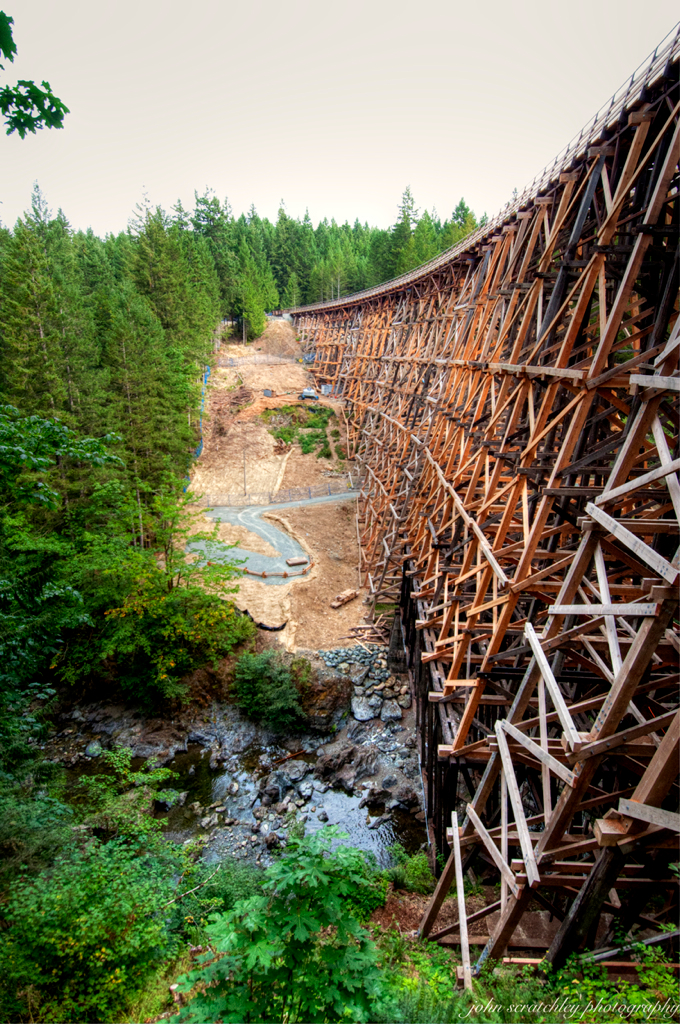
The Kinsol Trestle

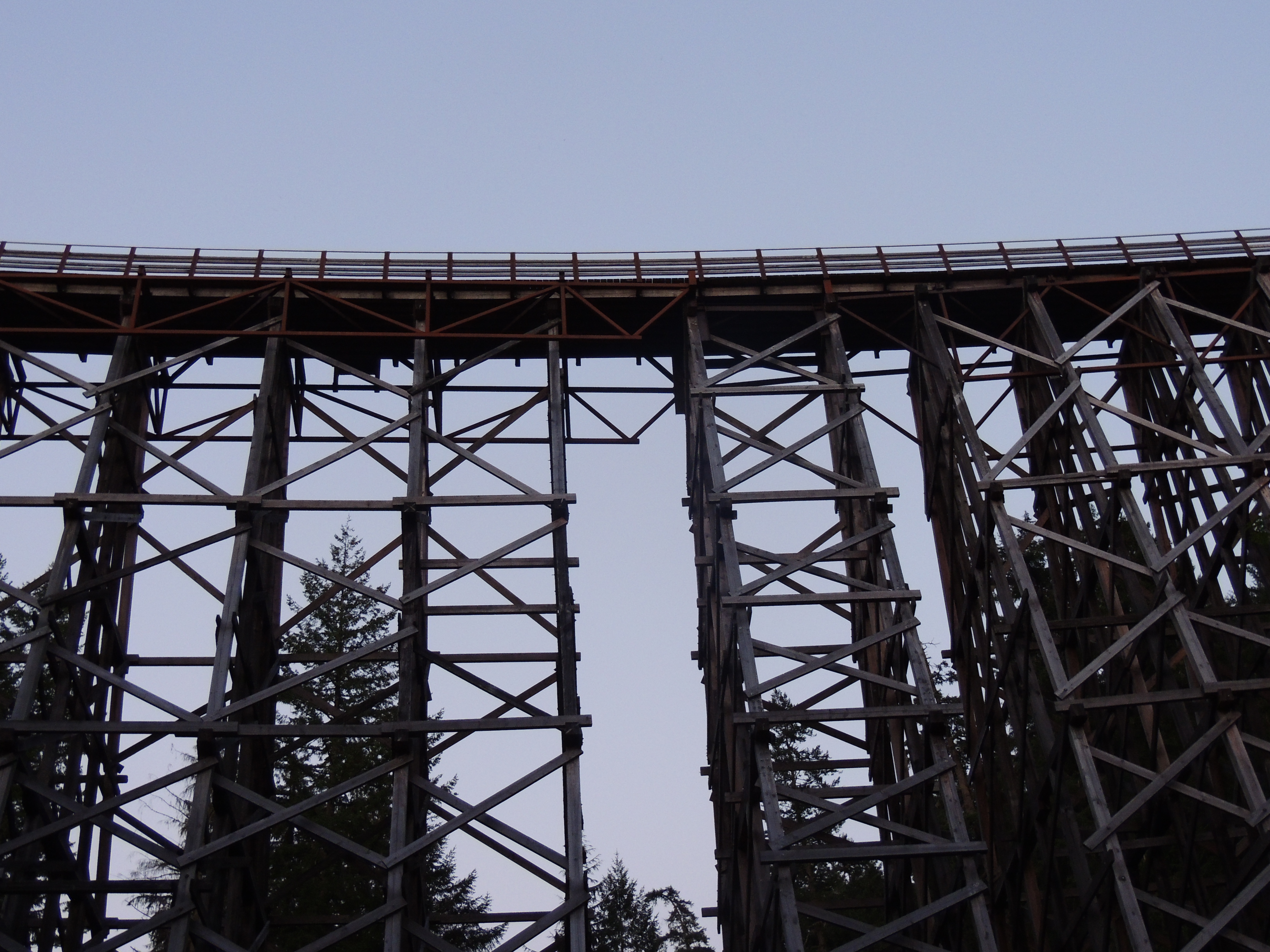
The Kinsol Trestle

The Kinsol Trestle, also known as the Koksilah River Trestle, is a wooden railway trestle located on Vancouver Island, north of Shawnigan Lake, in British Columbia, Canada. It is a crossing of the Koksilah River.

== Description ==
The bridge's dimensions measure 44 m (144 ft) high and 188 m (617 ft) long, making it the largest wooden trestle in the Commonwealth of Nations and one of the highest railway trestles in the world. It was constructed out of old-growth Douglas fir timbers, and has an unusual seven-degree curve.

== History ==
It was built as part of a plan to connect Victoria to Nootka Sound, passing through Cowichan Lake and Port Alberni, when forestry had gained some ground on Vancouver Island and a more efficient way to transport the region's huge, old-growth timber was needed. It was not built, as some mistakenly believe, to serve any nearby mines. It was named after the nearby Kinsol Station which, in turn, took its name from a nearby mining venture grandiosely named "King Solomon Mines", a very small mining venture that produced 18 t (19.8 short tons; 17.7 long tons) or 18,000 kg or 39,683 lb of copper and 6,300 g (203 ozt) of silver (from 254 t or 280 short tons or 250 long tons of ore—hardly enough to fill 3 rail cars) between 1924 and 1927.

The line was started in 1911 by the Canadian Northern Pacific Railway (CNoPR) and while it was designed by engineers, it was built by local farmers and loggers, with investment funds from the Canadian Western Lumber Company, which was the largest lumber company in the world at that time. The trestle was never completed by the CNoPR, and the line only reached Youbou before construction was terminated. The CNoPR was taken over by Canadian National Railways in 1918, and its line and the trestle were completed in 1920 as part of the "Galloping Goose" rail line. Additionally, the present assembly replaced the original high-level deck Howe Truss in a pragmatic response to damage by high waters in 1931.

The rail carried both passenger and freight traffic, including primarily timber and other forest products. The last train to cross the Kinsol was in 1979, and the trestle fell into disrepair afterwards.

=== Preservation Effort ===
CN's rail service on Vancouver Island was abandoned in the 1980s and the right of way given to the provincial Ministry of Transportation. Due to the deteriorated structure of the Kinsol Trestle, the bridge was not usable by walkers or bicyclists on the Trans-Canada Trail, and was in danger of being torn down because it posed an environmental concern and danger to the public.

This created some disagreement in the community. Some community groups set out to raise money to preserve the trestle for its historical and tourism value, whereas others simply wanted to repair the break in the Trans-Canada Trail as quickly and cheaply as possible. At that point in time crossing the Koksilah required an 8.5 km (5.3 mi) detour through difficult terrain.

The Cowichan Valley Regional District (CVRD) held a special meeting on June 7, 2007, to determine the fate of the Kinsol. During this meeting the CVRD Board received presentations from a local firm that specializes in building conservation: Macdonald & Lawrence Timber Framing Ltd proposed a conservation strategy that would see the bridge fully restored for pedestrian use as part of the Trans-Canada Trail network.

On September 20, 2007, the CVRD voted to move ahead with a feasibility study concerning the feasibility of the Kinsol Trestle. Three firms had responded to the CVRD request for proposals for restoration and the Vancouver firm Commonwealth Historic Resource Management Limited won the contract. Commonwealth has joined forces with Macdonald and Lawrence, the local timber construction firm that proposed a conservation strategy in June, 2007. M&L is local in the sense it is established in Cobble Hill (a community close to Shawnigan Lake and the Kinsol), but is world-renowned and has built many unique structures in Great Britain, received a commendation from Queen Elizabeth for its work in restoring Windsor Castle following the disastrous fire, and is working to restore the British explorer Shackleton's shack in the Antarctic and other unique projects.

In November 2007, Macdonald and Lawrence completed a major inspection of the trestle, drilling hundreds of test holes. The final report showed that 80% of the major timbers were still sound, and that it was feasible to restore the structure. M&L's report comprised the major portion of Commonwealth's report, which was presented to the CVRD on January 23, 2008. The board members voted overwhelmingly to have Commonwealth proceed with Phase 2 of the study to provide a detailed plan of restoration, including a full evaluation of costs. This report was delivered in November 2008.

The rehabilitation of the trestle cost approximately $5.7 million. M&L would ultimately collapse due to cost over-runs, but there would be benefits brought on by the rehabilitation of the Kinsol Trestle. The Kinsol Trestle is one of the few accessible and visible reminders of the early mining and logging industries in the Cowichan Valley, and increased tourism and recreation has created long-term economic and recreational benefits in the community. The rehabilitation also generated over 22 years of employment for the local population with direct and indirect work on the Trestle, engineering, and project management.

The official reopening of the trestle was July 28, 2011.

== The Kinsol Trestle Capital Campaign ==
With the recognition that the Kinsol Trestle would be preserved and rehabilitated, an official community based campaign was created in order to promote the Trestle and to raise the remaining $2 million necessary to complete the Kinsol Trestle.

An official fundraising campaign was launched in June 2009 in order to raise the remainder of the funds needed to rehabilitate the Trestle. The official "Save the Historic Kinsol Trestle Campaign" came through with the support of the Cowichan Foundation and the Cowichan Valley Regional District (CVRD). The campaign was launched on June 10, 2009, and the Trestle reopened to the public after major renovations on July 28, 2011. It is now a part of the Trans-Canada Trail and the Vancouver Island Trail.

== Gallery ==
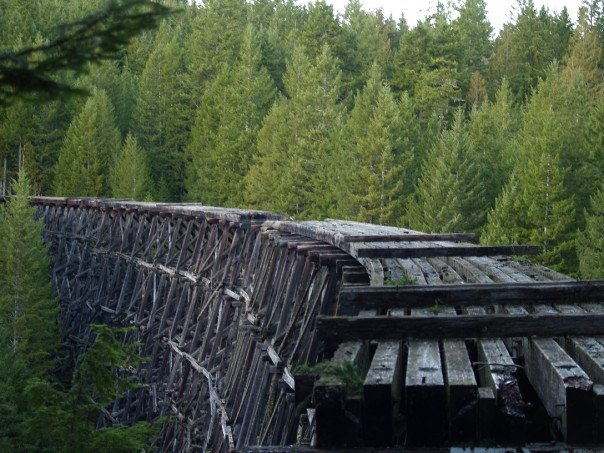

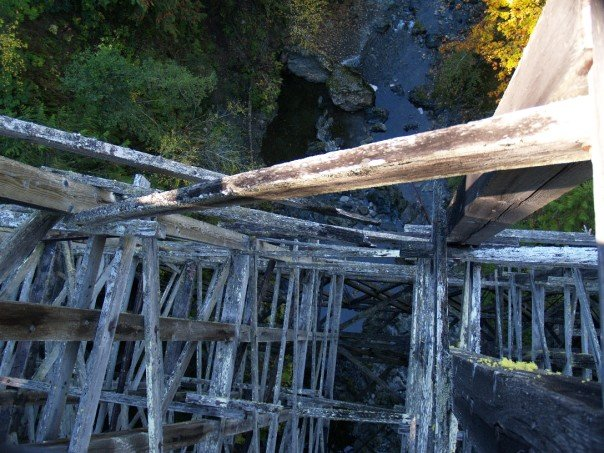

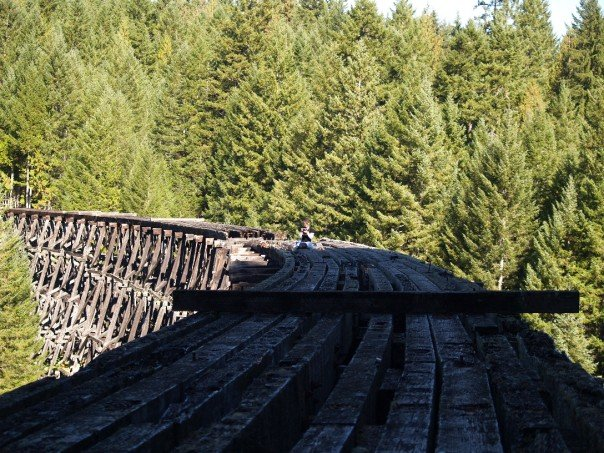

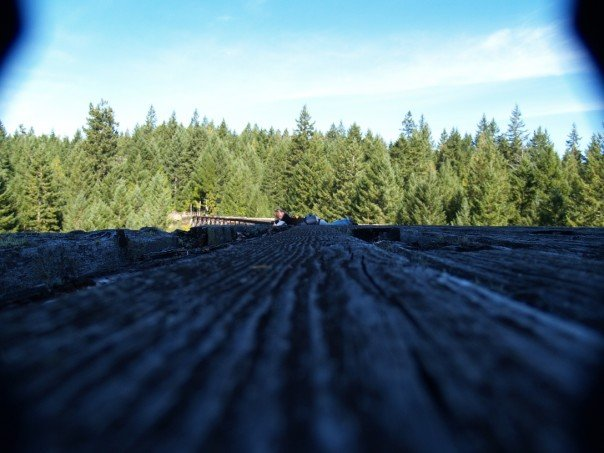

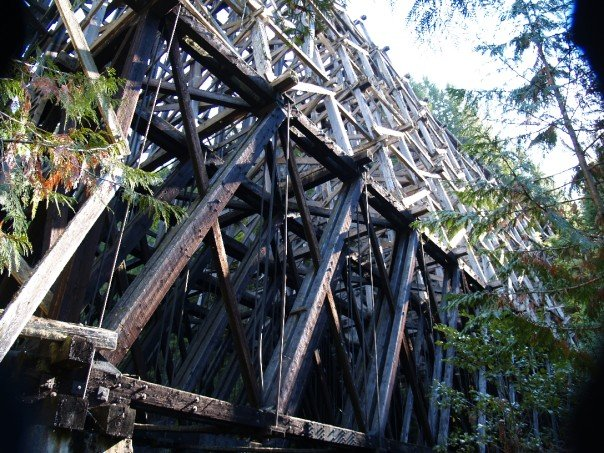

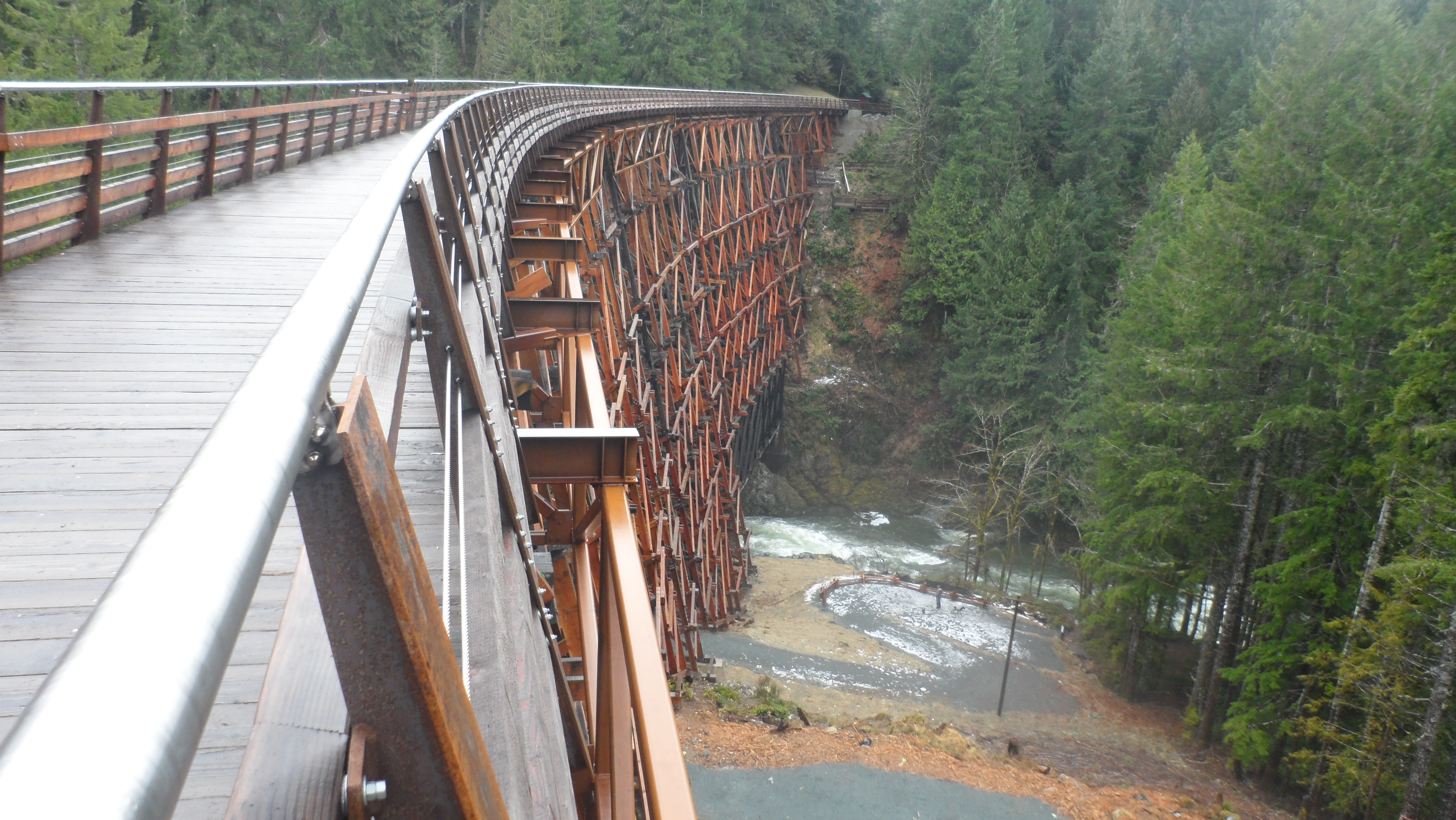

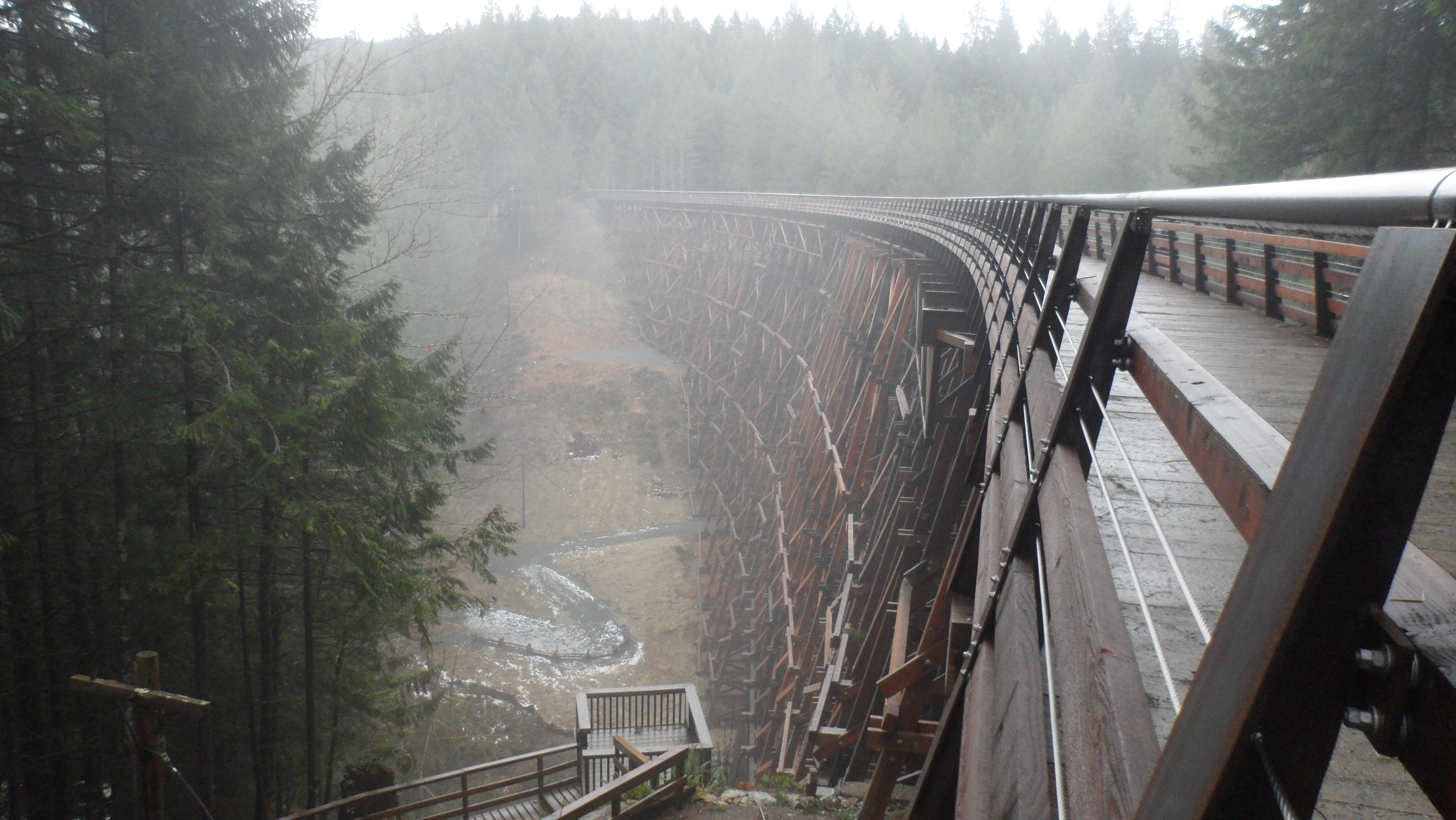

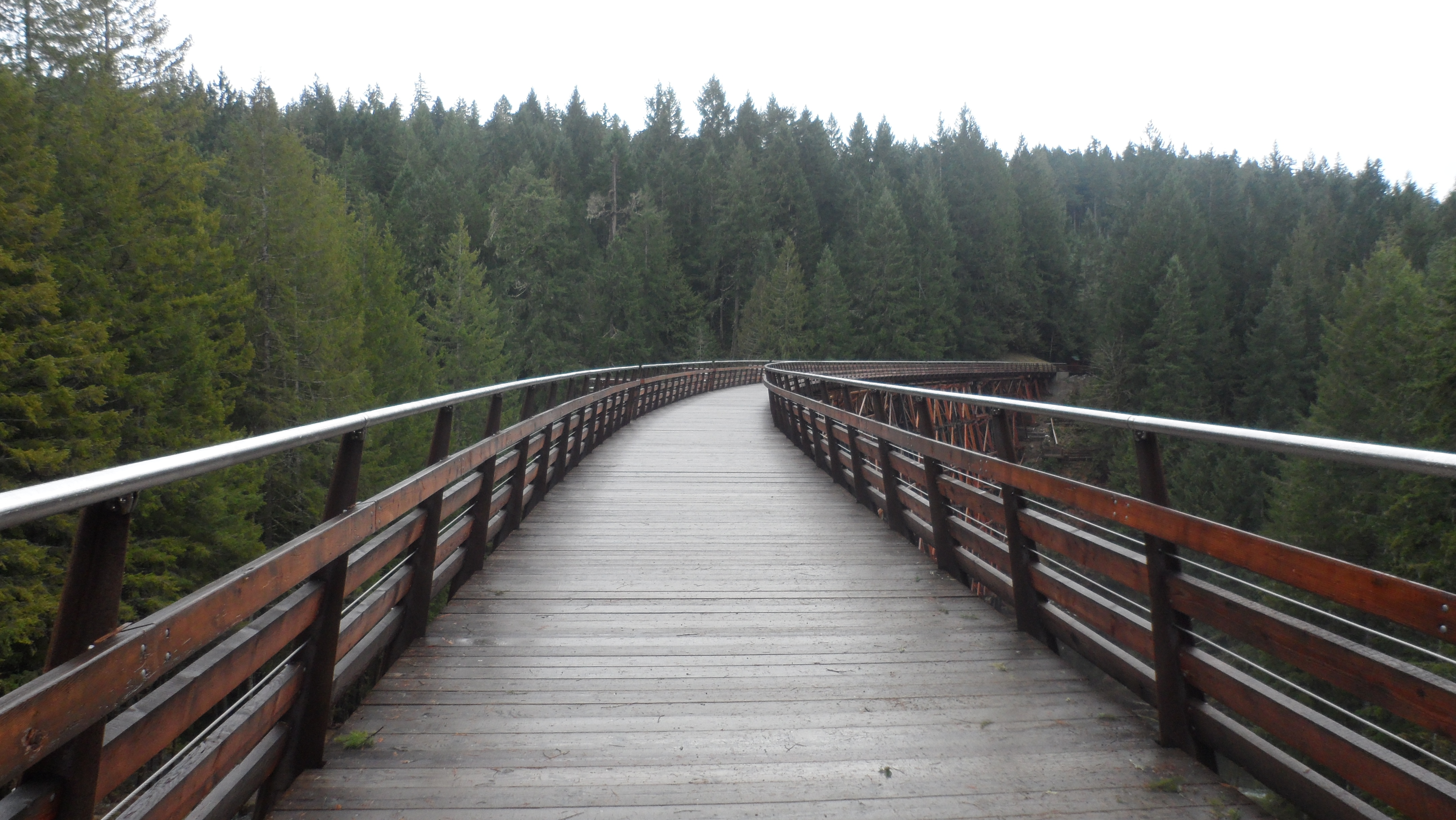

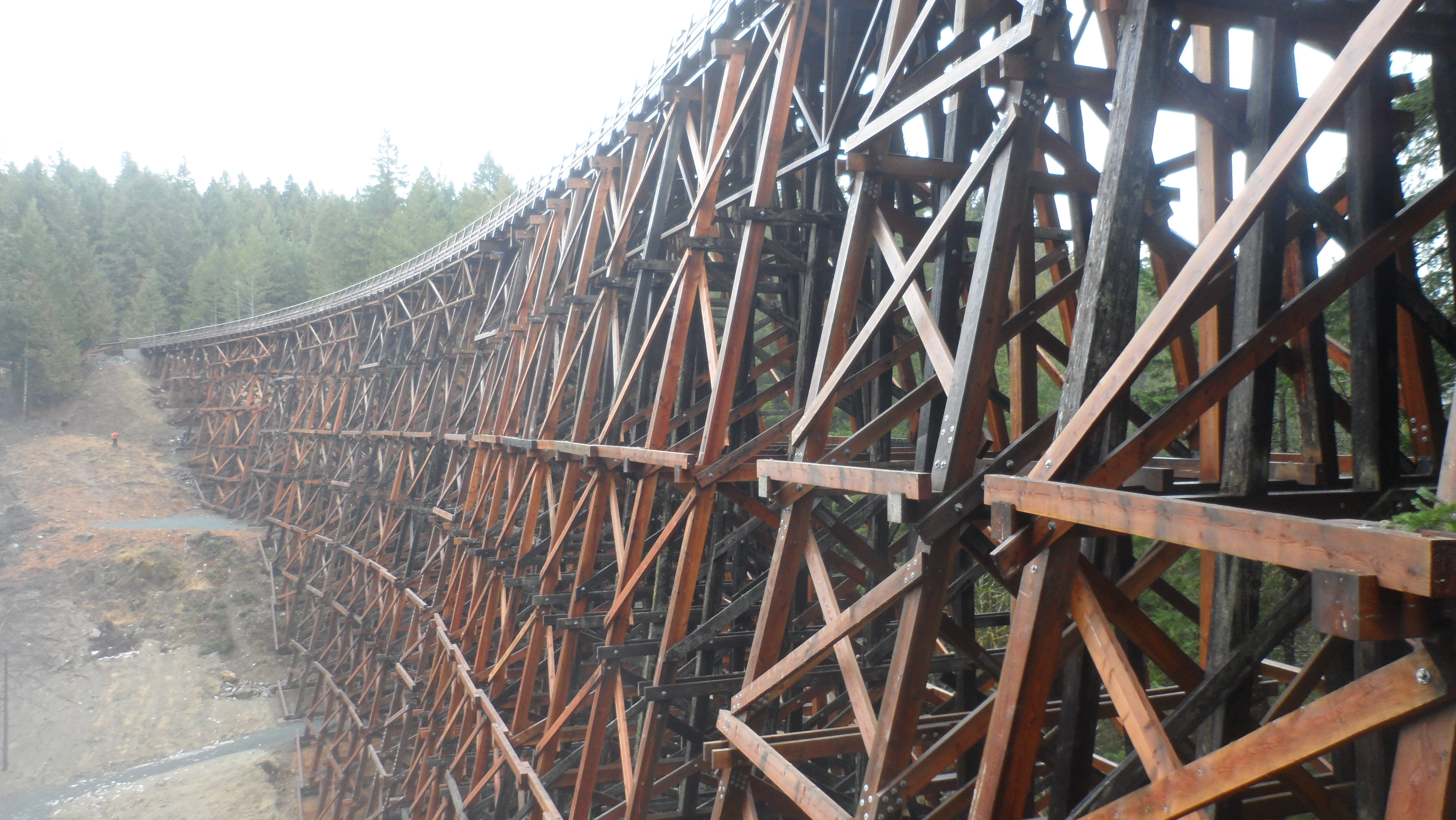

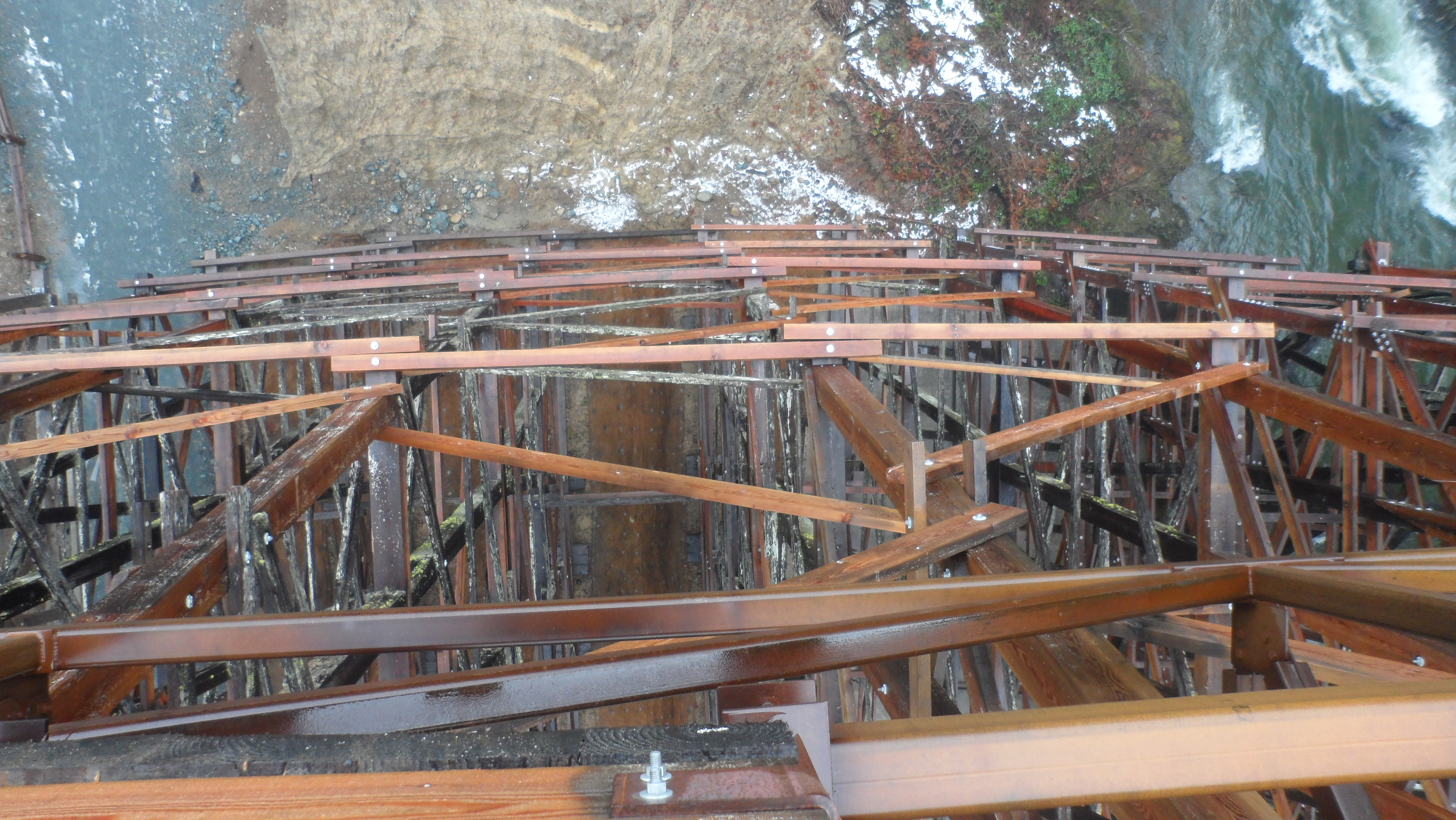

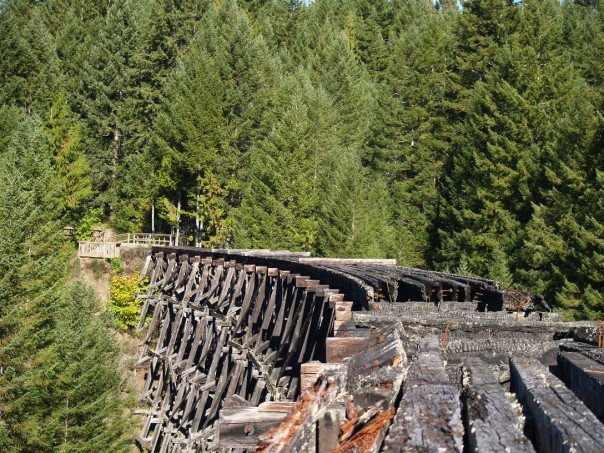

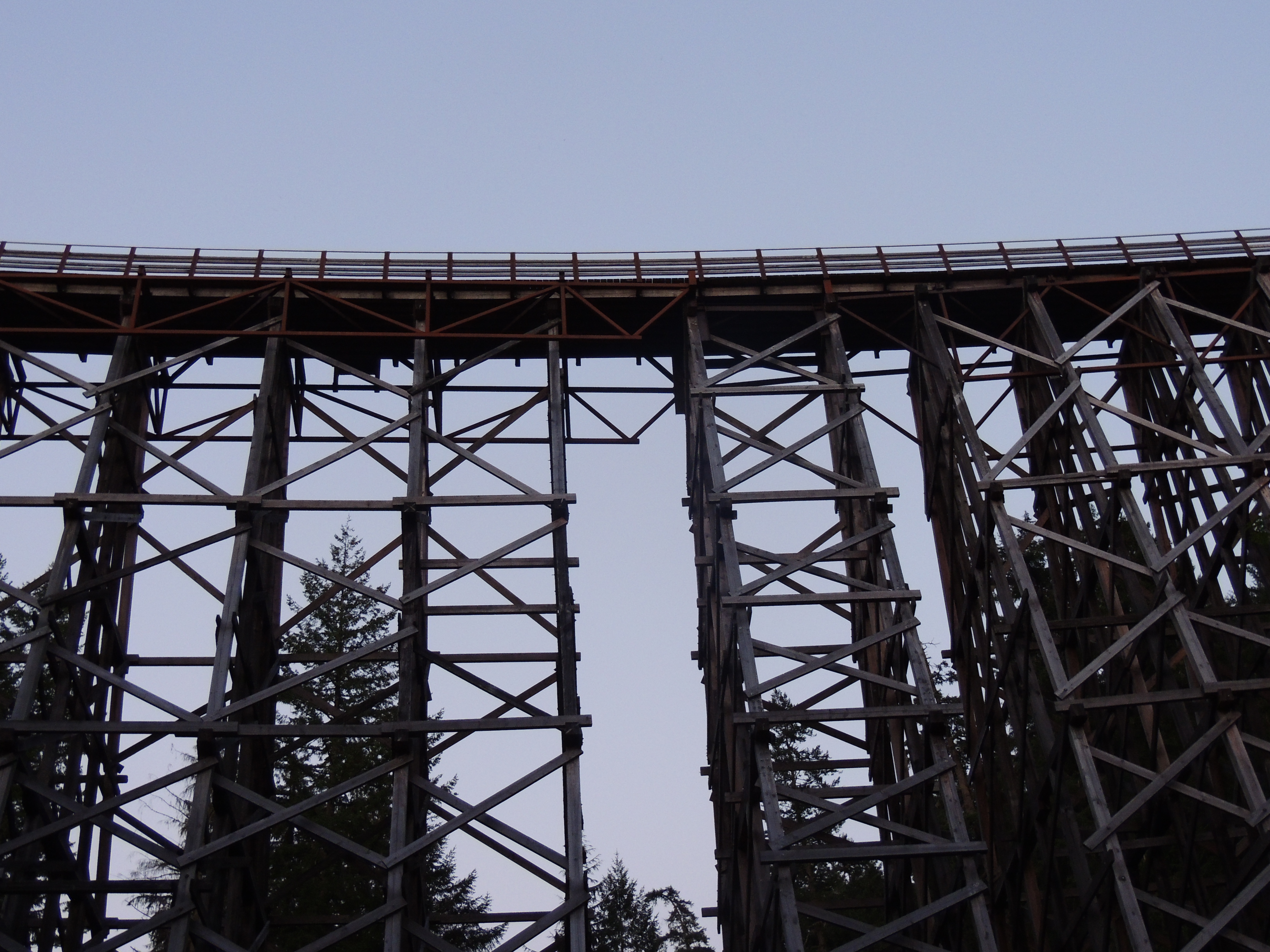
The Kinsol Trestle

== See also ==
- Galloping Goose Regional Trail
- Shawnigan Lake
- Shawnigan Lake, British Columbia, the village
