= Koksilah River Provincial Park =

Provincial park in British Columbia, Canada

- IUCN category II (national park)
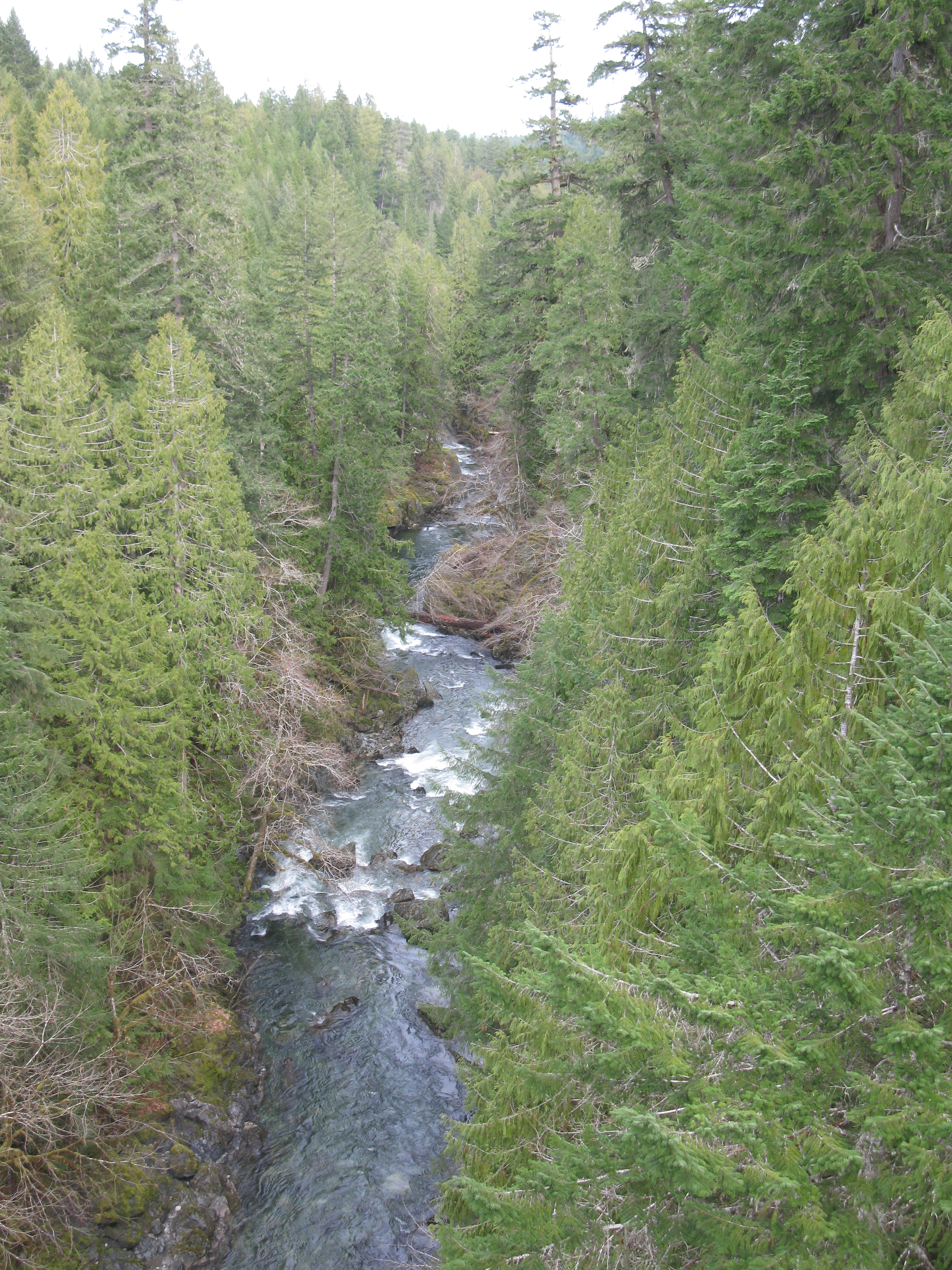
- Koksilah River

- Location within Vancouver Island Location within British Columbia Location within Cowichan Valley Regional District
- Interactive map of Koksilah River Provincial Park
- Location: Cowichan Valley RD, British Columbia, Canada
- Coordinates: 48°39′02″N 123°43′25″W
- Area: 230 ha (570 acres)
- Established: May 10, 1959
- Governing body: BC Parks

Koksilah River Provincial Park is a provincial park in British Columbia, Canada.

== Location ==
Koksilah River Park is located 4 km west of Shawnigan Lake on southern Vancouver Island.

== Activities ==
The park offers hiking, fishing, swimming, picnicking, scenic views, and mountain biking. The park is officially only open for day use activities although many people camp here in the summer months. This is a popular spot for motorcycles.

== Burnt Bridge ==
A gated metal bridge runs over the Koksilah River. It is called Burnt Bridge because the original (built in 1865) was destroyed in a forest fire. Burnt Bridge has been rebuilt twice. Also crossing the Koksilah River is the Kinsol Trestle, just east of the park.
