= Island Timberlands =

Island Timberlands LP, a private timberlands business in British Columbia, Canada, was created in 2005 by the purchase of lands from Weyerhaeuser's coastal BC timber estate, which had originally been purchased in 1999 from MacMillan Bloedel. The private managed forest lands comprise approximately 254,000 hectares of forests, both mature and regenerating. The majority of timber harvested from these lands is shipped to overseas clients as unprocessed logs.

Island Timberlands' (IT) corporate office is located in Nanaimo, BC, and the company is certified to the Sustainable Forestry Initiative (SFI) Forest Management Standard. Industry governed SFI certification is under scrutiny by various environmental watchdogs for greenwashing as 80% of the organization's funding comes from the wood and pulp industry and the environmental standards are adaptable based on the certified area across North America. Under SFI certification, IT is able and planning to harvest old growth forests on Cortes Island in September 2012.

Island Timberlands provides limited recreational opportunities for residents and visitors to south, central and east Vancouver Island, including Cortes Island. Access to these lands is limited to weekends between 8am-4pm for licensed, registered vehicles only. IT blocks access by way of gates. IT do not allow quads, ATVs or dirt bikes access. IT routinely block access to lakes (the east side of Boomerang Lake in their Northwest Bay logging division being one example) and lands by trenching or indiscriminately felling trees across trails. More access is sought by residents, user groups and hunters.

The proposed logging actions for the Fall of 2012 on Cortes Island have brought them under scrutiny and public petition by Wildstands, a Community group focusing on public awareness of realities and options in the BC forestry industry.

IT is managed by Brookfield Asset Management (BAM). BAM, one of the largest corporations in Canada, is most well known as the owner of Zucotti Park in New York City. In February 2012, Occupy movement protesters staged a 24-hour vigil in front of IT's main office.
